= 2017 TCR International Series Buriram round =

(Thailand) 2017 TCR International Series Buriram round
Round details
- Round 8 of 10 rounds in the 2017 TCR International Series
- Layout of the Chang International Circuit
- Location: Chang International Circuit, Buriram, Thailand
- Course: Permanent racing facility 4.554 km (2.830 mi)

TCR International Series

Race 1
- Date: 3 September 2017
- Laps: 14

Pole position
Driver	(Slovakia) Maťo Homola	DG Sport Compétition
- Time: 1:43.093

Podium
First	(Hungary) Norbert Michelisz	M1RA
Second	(Serbia) Dušan Borković	GE-Force
Third	(Hungary) Attila Tassi	M1RA

Fastest lap
Driver	(Slovakia) Maťo Homola	DG Sport Compétition
- Time: 1:44.834 (on lap 4)

Race 2
- Date: 3 September 2017
- Laps: 14

Podium
First	(France) Aurélien Panis	Boutsen Ginion Racing
Second	(Italy) Giacomo Altoè	M1RA
Third	(Switzerland) Stefano Comini	Comtoyou Racing

Fastest lap
Driver	(France) Aurélien Panis	Boutsen Ginion Racing
- Time: 1:44.446 (on lap 4)

The 2017 TCR International Series Buriram round was the eighth round of the 2017 TCR International Series season. It took place on 3 September at the Chang International Circuit.

Norbert Michelisz won the first race starting from third position and Aurélien Panis gained the second one, starting from pole position, both driving a Honda Civic Type-R TCR.

== Ballast ==
Due to the results obtained in the previous round, Gianni Morbidelli received +30 kg, Daniel Lloyd +20 kg and Maťo Homola +10 kg. While Norbert Michelisz will take his +20 kg of ballast carried over from the Hungaroring round.

The Balance of Performance was also adjusted for this event, meaning the Audi RS3 LMS TCRs and Honda Civic Type-R TCRs was both given a -10 kg weight break.

== Classification ==
=== Qualifying ===
Pos.	No.	Driver	Car	Team	Q1	Q2	Grid	Points
1	70	(Slovakia) Maťo Homola	Opel Astra TCR	(Belgium) DG Sport Compétition	1:43.350	1:43.093	1	5
2	54	(United Kingdom) James Nash	SEAT León TCR	(Hong Kong) Lukoil Craft-Bamboo Racing	1:43.672	1:43.097	2	4
3	59	(Hungary) Norbert Michelisz	Honda Civic Type-R TCR	(Hungary) M1RA	1:43.315	1:43.228	3	3
4	2	(France) Jean-Karl Vernay	Volkswagen Golf GTI TCR	(Luxembourg) Leopard Racing Team WRT	1:43.447	1:43.320	4	2
5	9	(Hungary) Attila Tassi	Honda Civic Type-R TCR	(Hungary) M1RA	1:43.365	1:43.331	5	1
6	74	(Spain) Pepe Oriola	SEAT León TCR	(Hong Kong) Lukoil Craft-Bamboo Racing	1:43.478	1:43.384	6	
7	21	(Italy) Giacomo Altoè	Honda Civic Type-R TCR	(Hungary) M1RA	1:43.500	1:43.503	7	
8	19	(Thailand) Kantadhee Kusiri	Volkswagen Golf GTI TCR	(Sweden) WestCoast Racing	1:43.936	1:43.561	8	
9	1	(Switzerland) Stefano Comini	Audi RS3 LMS TCR	(Belgium) Comtoyou Racing	1:43.874	1:43.695	9	
10	28	(France) Aurélien Panis	Honda Civic Type-R TCR	(Belgium) Boutsen Ginion Racing	1:43.813	1:43.743	22^{1}	
11	10	(Italy) Gianni Morbidelli	Volkswagen Golf GTI TCR	(Sweden) WestCoast Racing	1:44.226	1:44.064	10	
12	16	(Georgia (country)) Davit Kajaia	Alfa Romeo Giulietta TCR	(Georgia (country)) GE-Force	1:43.783	No time	23^{1}	
13	62	(Serbia) Dušan Borković	Alfa Romeo Giulietta TCR	(Georgia (country)) GE-Force	1:43.631^{2}		11	
14	17	(United Kingdom) Daniel Lloyd	SEAT León TCR	(Hong Kong) Lukoil Craft-Bamboo Racing	1:44.246		12	
15	6	(Belgium) Frédéric Vervisch	Audi RS3 LMS TCR	(Belgium) Comtoyou Racing	1:44.316		13	
16	3	(United Kingdom) Robert Huff	Volkswagen Golf GTI TCR	(Luxembourg) Leopard Racing Team WRT	1:44.321		14	
17	67	(Thailand) Munkong Sathienthirakul	Opel Astra TCR	(Belgium) DG Sport Compétition	1:44.870		15	
18	18	(United States) Duncan Ende	SEAT León TCR	(United States) Icarus Motorsports	1:45.068		16	
19	85	(Thailand) Chariya Nuya	Honda Civic Type-R TCR	(Thailand) Billionaire Boys Racing	1:45.082		17	
20	96	(Thailand) Nattanid Leewattanavaragul	SEAT León TCR	(Thailand) Morin Racing Team	1:46.061		18	
21	84	(Thailand) Pasarit Promsombat	SEAT León TCR	(Thailand) RMI Racing Team by Sunoco	1:46.098		19	
22	83	(Thailand) Rattanin Leenutaphong	SEAT León TCR	(Thailand) Yontrakit Racing Team	1:46.900		20	
23	86	(Thailand) Nattachak Hanjitkasen	Honda Civic Type-R TCR	(Thailand) TBN MK Ihere Racing Team	1:47.055		21	
24	65	(Malaysia) Douglas Khoo	SEAT León TCR	(Malaysia) Viper Niza Racing	1:51.876		24^{3}	

Notes

- ^1 — Aurélien Panis and Davit Kajaia was both sent to the back of the grid for Race 1, after an engine change.
- ^2 — Dušan Borković was not allowed to start Q2, after having received external aid, after he broke the suspension on his car during Q1. Gianni Morbidelli who had qualified 13th in Q1, was allowed to take his place in Q2.
- ^3 — Douglas Khoo was sent to the back of the grid for both races, after having not set a time within the 107% limit during qualifying.

=== Race 1 ===
Pos.	No.	Driver	Car	Team	Laps	Time/Retired	Grid	Points
1	59	(Hungary) Norbert Michelisz	Honda Civic Type-R TCR	(Hungary) M1RA	14	24:44.820	3	25
2	62	(Serbia) Dušan Borković	Alfa Romeo Giulietta TCR	(Georgia (country)) GE-Force	14	+3.769	11	18
3	9	(Hungary) Attila Tassi	Honda Civic Type-R TCR	(Hungary) M1RA	14	+5.923	5	15
4	2	(France) Jean-Karl Vernay	Volkswagen Golf GTI TCR	(Luxembourg) Leopard Racing Team WRT	14	+6.211	4	12
5	3	(United Kingdom) Robert Huff	Volkswagen Golf GTI TCR	(Luxembourg) Leopard Racing Team WRT	14	+6.428	14	10
6	21	(Italy) Giacomo Altoè	Honda Civic Type-R TCR	(Hungary) M1RA	14	+7.358	7	8
7	1	(Switzerland) Stefano Comini	Audi RS3 LMS TCR	(Belgium) Comtoyou Racing	14	+10.610	9	6
8	16	(Georgia (country)) Davit Kajaia	Alfa Romeo Giulietta TCR	(Georgia (country)) GE-Force	14	+11.142	23	4
9	17	(United Kingdom) Daniel Lloyd	SEAT León TCR	(Hong Kong) Lukoil Craft-Bamboo Racing	14	+14.196	12	2
10	10	(Italy) Gianni Morbidelli	Volkswagen Golf GTI TCR	(Sweden) WestCoast Racing	14	+15.050	10	1
11	6	(Belgium) Frédéric Vervisch	Audi RS3 LMS TCR	(Belgium) Comtoyou Racing	14	+16.646	13	
12	19	(Thailand) Kantadhee Kusiri	Volkswagen Golf GTI TCR	(Sweden) WestCoast Racing	14	+17.143	8	
13	18	(United States) Duncan Ende	SEAT León TCR	(United States) Icarus Motorsports	14	+19.316	16	
14	67	(Thailand) Munkong Sathienthirakul	Opel Astra TCR	(Belgium) DG Sport Compétition	14	+22.733	15	
15	85	(Thailand) Chariya Nuya	Honda Civic Type-R TCR	(Thailand) Billionaire Boys Racing	14	+26.322	17	
16	96	(Thailand) Nattanid Leewattanavaragul	SEAT León TCR	(Thailand) Morin Racing Team	14	+29.542	18	
17	83	(Thailand) Rattanin Leenutaphong	SEAT León TCR	(Thailand) Yontrakit Racing Team	14	+42.071	20	
18	86	(Thailand) Nattachak Hanjitkasen	Honda Civic Type-R TCR	(Thailand) TBN MK Ihere Racing Team	14	+42.445	21	
19	28	(France) Aurélien Panis	Honda Civic Type-R TCR	(Belgium) Boutsen Ginion Racing	14	+54.267	22	
20	65	(Malaysia) Douglas Khoo	SEAT León TCR	(Malaysia) Viper Niza Racing	14	+1:46.431	24	
21	74	(Spain) Pepe Oriola	SEAT León TCR	(Hong Kong) Lukoil Craft-Bamboo Racing	13	Gearbox	6	
22	70	(Slovakia) Maťo Homola	Opel Astra TCR	(Belgium) DG Sport Compétition	12	Puncture	1	
23	84	(Thailand) Pasarit Promsombat	SEAT León TCR	(Thailand) RMI Racing Team by Sunoco	12	Collision	19	
Ret	54	(United Kingdom) James Nash	SEAT León TCR	(Hong Kong) Lukoil Craft-Bamboo Racing	7	Driveshaft	2	

=== Race 2 ===
Pos.	No.	Driver	Car	Team	Laps	Time/Retired	Grid	Points
1	28	(France) Aurélien Panis	Honda Civic Type-R TCR	(Belgium) Boutsen Ginion Racing	14	24:34.503	1	25
2	21	(Italy) Giacomo Altoè	Honda Civic Type-R TCR	(Hungary) M1RA	14	+1.274	4	18
3	1	(Switzerland) Stefano Comini	Audi RS3 LMS TCR	(Belgium) Comtoyou Racing	14	+6.120	2	15
4	9	(Hungary) Attila Tassi	Honda Civic Type-R TCR	(Hungary) M1RA	14	+7.994	6	12
5	2	(France) Jean-Karl Vernay	Volkswagen Golf GTI TCR	(Luxembourg) Leopard Racing Team WRT	14	+9.414	7	10
6	62	(Serbia) Dušan Borković	Alfa Romeo Giulietta TCR	(Georgia (country)) GE-Force	14	+12.632	13	8
7	54	(United Kingdom) James Nash	SEAT León TCR	(Hong Kong) Lukoil Craft-Bamboo Racing	14	+13.369	9	6
8	3	(United Kingdom) Robert Huff	Volkswagen Golf GTI TCR	(Luxembourg) Leopard Racing Team WRT	14	+13.861	16	4
9	70	(Slovakia) Maťo Homola	Opel Astra TCR	(Belgium) DG Sport Compétition	14	+18.084	10	2
10	19	(Thailand) Kantadhee Kusiri	Volkswagen Golf GTI TCR	(Sweden) WestCoast Racing	14	+18.830	3	1
11	17	(United Kingdom) Daniel Lloyd	SEAT León TCR	(Hong Kong) Lukoil Craft-Bamboo Racing	14	+20.555	14	
12	67	(Thailand) Munkong Sathienthirakul	Opel Astra TCR	(Belgium) DG Sport Compétition	14	+21.357	17	
13	10	(Italy) Gianni Morbidelli	Volkswagen Golf GTI TCR	(Sweden) WestCoast Racing	14	+22.946	11	
14	6	(Belgium) Frédéric Vervisch	Audi RS3 LMS TCR	(Belgium) Comtoyou Racing	14	+30.660	15	
15	18	(United States) Duncan Ende	SEAT León TCR	(United States) Icarus Motorsports	14	+31.425	18	
16	85	(Thailand) Chariya Nuya	Honda Civic Type-R TCR	(Thailand) Billionaire Boys Racing	14	+35.585	19	
17	96	(Thailand) Nattanid Leewattanavaragul	SEAT León TCR	(Thailand) Morin Racing Team	14	+36.363	20	
18	84	(Thailand) Pasarit Promsombat	SEAT León TCR	(Thailand) RMI Racing Team by Sunoco	14	+48.076	21	
19	83	(Thailand) Rattanin Leenutaphong	SEAT León TCR	(Thailand) Yontrakit Racing Team	14	+49.369	22	
20	86	(Thailand) Nattachak Hanjitkasen	Honda Civic Type-R TCR	(Thailand) TBN MK Ihere Racing Team	14	+54.333	23	
21	65	(Malaysia) Douglas Khoo	SEAT León TCR	(Malaysia) Viper Niza Racing	14	+1:38.064	24	
22	59	(Hungary) Norbert Michelisz	Honda Civic Type-R TCR	(Hungary) M1RA	13	Technical	8	
23	16	(Georgia (country)) Davit Kajaia	Alfa Romeo Giulietta TCR	(Georgia (country)) GE-Force	11	Puncture	12	
DNS	74	(Spain) Pepe Oriola	SEAT León TCR	(Hong Kong) Lukoil Craft-Bamboo Racing		Gearbox	5	

== Standings after the event ==
Drivers' Championship standings

	Pos	Driver	Points
1	1	(Hungary) Attila Tassi	179
1	2	(France) Jean-Karl Vernay	177
1	3	(Switzerland) Stefano Comini	165
1	4	(Italy) Roberto Colciago	145
	5	(Spain) Pepe Oriola	110

Model of the Year standings

	Pos	Car	Points
	1	Honda Civic Type-R TCR	451
1	2	Volkswagen Golf GTI TCR	355
1	3	SEAT León TCR	335
	4	Audi RS3 LMS TCR	253
	5	Alfa Romeo Giulietta TCR	189

Teams' Championship standings

	Pos	Driver	Points
	1	(Hungary) M1RA	382
	2	(Hong Kong) Lukoil Craft-Bamboo Racing	289
1	3	(Luxembourg) Leopard Racing Team WRT	247
1	4	(Belgium) Comtoyou Racing	236
	5	(Georgia (country)) GE-Force	177

- Note: Only the top five positions are included for both sets of drivers' standings.
