= 2017 TCR Asia Series =

Car racing competition

The 2017 TCR Asia Series season is the third season of the TCR Asia Series.

== Teams and drivers ==
Team	Car	No.	Drivers	Class	Rounds
(Germany) Liqui Moly Team Engstler	Volkswagen Golf GTI TCR	2	(Thailand) Kantadhee Kusiri		All
(Germany) Liqui Moly Team Engstler	Volkswagen Golf GTI TCR	32	(Ecuador) Diego Moran		All
(Hong Kong) / Audi Hong Kong (Note: Car No. 3, 5 and 6 entered as Audi Hong Kong and car No. 8 entered as Phoenix Racing Asia.); (Hong Kong) / Phoenix Racing Asia	Audi RS3 LMS TCR	3	(Hong Kong) Shaun Thong		3–4
(Hong Kong) / Audi Hong Kong; (Hong Kong) / Phoenix Racing Asia	Audi RS3 LMS TCR	5	(Hong Kong) Jasper Thong	Cup	All
(Hong Kong) / Audi Hong Kong; (Hong Kong) / Phoenix Racing Asia	Audi RS3 LMS TCR	6	(Hong Kong) Alex Fong	Cup	2
(Hong Kong) / Audi Hong Kong; (Hong Kong) / Phoenix Racing Asia	Audi RS3 LMS TCR	8	(Hong Kong) Tong Siu Kau	Cup	1–2
(Malaysia) Viper Niza Racing	SEAT León TCR	65	(Malaysia) Douglas Khoo	Cup	All
Team Thailand	Volkswagen Golf GTI TCR	9	(Thailand) Tin Sritrai		1
Team Thailand	Honda Civic TCR	79	(Thailand) Tin Sritrai		2–6
(Malaysia) R Engineering	Honda Civic TCR	23	(Malaysia) Abdul Kaathir	Cup	All
(Malaysia) R Engineering	Honda Civic TCR	39	(Malaysia) Lai Wee Sing		All
(Macau) Elegant Racing Team	SEAT León TCR	98	(Hong Kong) Eric Kwong	Cup	All
(Macau) Elegant Racing Team	SEAT León TCR	99	(Macau) Alex Liu	Cup	All
(Macau) Elegant Racing Team	SEAT León TCR	991	(Macau) Wong Kiang Kuan	Cup	5
Entries ineligible to score points
(Malaysia) Viper Niza Racing	SEAT León TCR	7	(Hong Kong) William O'Brien	Cup	3
(China) Leo 109 Racing	Audi RS3 LMS TCR	9	(China) Deng Bao Wei		5–6
(China) Leo 109 Racing	Audi RS3 LMS TCR	9	(China) Li Lin		5
(China) Leo 109 Racing	Volkswagen Golf GTi TCR	77	(China) Hu Hao		5–6
(Thailand) / RMI Racing Team By Sunoco (Note: Car No. 14 entered as RMI Racing Team By Sunoco and car No. 96 entered as RMI Racing Team.); (Thailand) / RMI Racing Team	SEAT León TCR	14	(Thailand) Pasarit Promsombat		4
(Thailand) / RMI Racing Team By Sunoco; (Thailand) / RMI Racing Team	SEAT León Cup Racer	96	(Thailand) Nattanid Leewattanavaragul		4
(Thailand) Billionaire Boy Racing	Honda Civic TCR	15	(Thailand) Chariya Nuya		4
(China) New Faster Team	Volkswagen Golf GTi TCR	21	(China) Lin Li Feng		5–6
(China) New Faster Team	Volkswagen Golf GTi TCR	21	(China) Wang Hao		5–6
(China) New Faster Team	Audi RS3 LMS TCR	81	(China) Huang Chu Han		5–6
(China) New Faster Team	Audi RS3 LMS TCR	82	(Hong Kong) Andy Yan		5–6
Macau David Racing Team	Volkswagen Golf GTI TCR	26	(Macau) Filipe de Souza		2
(Hong Kong) TeamWork Motorsport	Volkswagen Golf GTi TCR	26	(Macau) Filipe de Souza		5–6
(Hong Kong) TeamWork Motorsport	Volkswagen Golf GTi TCR	26	(Hong Kong) Samuel Hsieh		5–6
(Hong Kong) TeamWork Motorsport	Volkswagen Golf GTi TCR	31	(Hong Kong) Alex Hui		5–6
(Hong Kong) TeamWork Motorsport	Volkswagen Golf GTi TCR	31	(China) Ma Qing Hua		5
(Hong Kong) TeamWork Motorsport	Volkswagen Golf GTi TCR	31	(France) Jean-Karl Vernay		6
(Hong Kong) TeamWork Motorsport	Volkswagen Golf GTi TCR	62	(Hong Kong) Alex Fung		5–6
(Hong Kong) TeamWork Motorsport	Volkswagen Golf GTi TCR	62	(Hong Kong) Sunny Wong		5–6
(Thailand) Yontrakit Racing	SEAT León TCR	38	(Thailand) Rattanin Leenutaphong		4
(China) HE Racing	Volkswagen Golf GTi TCR	58	(China) He Xiao Le		5
(China) HE Racing	Volkswagen Golf GTi TCR	58	(China) Lu Chuan		5
(China) HE Racing	Volkswagen Golf GTi TCR	58	(China) Lo Kai Bong		6
(China) TrackFun-Linky Racing Team	Audi RS3 LMS TCR	66	(China) Cai Hong Yu		5–6
(China) TrackFun-Linky Racing Team	Audi RS3 LMS TCR	66	(China) Bai Ya Xin		5
(Thailand) TBN MK Ihere Racing Team	Honda Civic TCR	66	(Thailand) Nattachak Hanjitkasen		4
(China) TianShi Racing Team	Audi RS3 LMS TCR	66	(China) Huang Chu Han		2
(China) TianShi Racing Team	Audi RS3 LMS TCR	88	(China) Chen Wei An		2
Singha Motorsport Team Thailand	SEAT León Cup Racer	89	(Thailand) Kittipol Ayudhya		4
(China) AVM Racing	SEAT León TCR	791	(China) Qi Pei Wen		5–6
(China) AVM Racing	SEAT León TCR	791	(China) Zhou Hao Wen		5–6

== Calendar and results ==
The 2017 initial schedule was announced on 8 November 2016, with six events scheduled. On 2 February 2017, the 2017 schedule has changed with the entry of Zhuhai events. On 29 March 2017, the calendar was once again changed with Zhuhai replacing the round in Thailand held at the Chang International Circuit, Zhejiang and Shanghai will also switch places on the calendar. The Macau round was also removed.

Rnd.		Circuit	Date	Pole position	Fastest lap	Winning driver	Winning team	Supporting
1	1	(Malaysia) Sepang International Circuit, Kuala Lumpur	12 March	(Thailand) Kantadhee Kusiri	(Thailand) Kantadhee Kusiri	(Thailand) Kantadhee Kusiri	(Germany) Liqui Moly Team Engstler	
1	2	(Malaysia) Sepang International Circuit, Kuala Lumpur	12 March		(Thailand) Kantadhee Kusiri	(Ecuador) Diego Moran	(Germany) Liqui Moly Team Engstler	
2	3	(China) Zhuhai International Circuit, Zhuhai	23 April	(Hong Kong) Jasper Thong	(Thailand) Tin Sritrai	(Hong Kong) Jasper Thong	Audi Hong Kong	
2	4	(China) Zhuhai International Circuit, Zhuhai	23 April		(China) Huang Chu Han	(Thailand) Tin Sritrai	Team Thailand	
3	5	(China) Zhuhai International Circuit, Zhuhai	14 May	(Thailand) Kantadhee Kusiri	(Hong Kong) Shaun Thong	(Malaysia) Abdul Kaathir	(Malaysia) R Engineering	
3	6	(China) Zhuhai International Circuit, Zhuhai	14 May		(Thailand) Kantadhee Kusiri	(Hong Kong) Eric Kwong	(Macau) Elegant Racing Team	
4	7	(Thailand) Bangsaen Street Circuit, Chonburi	1 July	(Thailand) Kantadhee Kusiri	(Thailand) Tin Sritrai (Note: Actual fastest lap of race recorded by TCR Thailand Series driver Pasarit Promsombat.)	(Thailand) Tin Sritrai	Team Thailand	TCR Thailand Series
4	8	(Thailand) Bangsaen Street Circuit, Chonburi	2 July		(Thailand) Tin Sritrai	(Thailand) Tin Sritrai	Team Thailand	TCR Thailand Series
5	9	(China) Shanghai International Circuit, Shanghai	26 August	(Thailand) Kantadhee Kusiri	(Thailand) Kantadhee Kusiri	(Thailand) Kantadhee Kusiri	(Germany) Liqui Moly Team Engstler	TCR China Series
5	10	(China) Shanghai International Circuit, Shanghai	27 August		(Thailand) Kantadhee Kusiri	(Thailand) Kantadhee Kusiri	(Germany) Liqui Moly Team Engstler	TCR China Series
6	11	(China) Zhejiang International Circuit, Shaoxing	7 October	(Thailand) Kantadhee Kusiri (Note: Actual pole position taken by TCR China Series driver Jean-Karl Vernay.)	(Thailand) Kantadhee Kusiri (Note: Actual fastest lap of race recorded by TCR China Series driver Jean-Karl Vernay.)	(Thailand) Kantadhee Kusiri (Note: Actual victory in race scored by TCR China Series driver Jean-Karl Vernay.)	(Germany) Liqui Moly Team Engstler	TCR China Series; TCR International Series
6	12	(China) Zhejiang International Circuit, Shaoxing	7 October		(Ecuador) Diego Moran	(Thailand) Tin Sritrai	Team Thailand	TCR China Series; TCR International Series

== Championship standings ==
=== Drivers' championship ===
Pos.	Driver	SEP (Malaysia)		ZHU (China)		ZHU (China)		BNG† (Thailand)		SHA (China)		ZHE (China)		Pts.
Pos.	Driver	RD1	RD2	RD1	RD2	RD1	RD2	RD1	RD2	RD1	RD2	RD1	RD2	Pts.
1	(Thailand) Kantadhee Kusiri	**1**^{1}	9	2^{3}	4	**9**^{1}	6	**Ret**^{1}	7	**1**^{1}	1	4	4	188
2	(Thailand) Tin Sritrai	3^{3}	5	5^{4}	1	Ret	Ret	1^{2}	1	4^{5}	6	10	1	176.5
3	(Ecuador) Diego Moran	2^{2}	1	4	8	3^{4}	NC	Ret^{5}	2	2^{2}	2	13	3	167
4	(Malaysia) Lai Wee Sing	4	2	8^{2}	3	2^{3}	4	2^{4}	Ret	16	8	15	Ret	137
5	(Malaysia) Abdul Kaathir	6	3	6^{5}	6	1^{2}	7	Ret	8	9^{3}	9	9	5	131
6	(Hong Kong) Jasper Thong	5^{4}	4	**1**^{1}	11	4	Ret	DSQ	Ret	13	10	Ret	11	94
7	(Hong Kong) Eric Kwong	Ret^{5}	DNS	10	9	5	1	8	Ret	Ret	16	6	12	86
8	(Macau) Alex Liu	7	7	9	Ret	6	2	Ret	4	WD	WD	DNS	10	61.5
9	(Malaysia) Douglas Khoo	9	8	11	10	8	5	Ret	Ret	14^{4}	12	Ret	16	46
10	(Hong Kong) Shaun Thong					Ret^{5}	3	6^{3}	6					40
11	(Macau) Wong Kiang Kuan									8	11			18
12	(Hong Kong) Tong Siu Kau	8	6	Ret	Ret									12
13	(Hong Kong) Alex Fong			Ret	12									2
Drivers ineligible to score points
	(Hong Kong) Alex Hui									Ret	4	**1**	6	
	(France) Jean-Karl Vernay											**1**	6	
	(Hong Kong) Andy Yan									5	5	2	2	
	(Macau) Filipe de Souza			7	2					7	Ret	Ret	8	
	(Thailand) Nattanid Leewattanavaragul							4	3					
	(China) Huang Chu Han			3	5					3	Ret	3	7	
	(Thailand) Pasarit Promsombat							3	5					
	(Hong Kong) Alex Fung (Hong Kong) Sunny Wong									6	3	12	Ret	
	(China) Ma Qing Hua									Ret	4			
	(China) Deng Bao Wei									Ret	15	5	9	
	(Thailand) Chariya Nuya							5	Ret					
	(China) Lin Li Feng (China) Wang Hao									10	7	8	Ret	
	(Hong Kong) Samuel Hsieh									7	Ret	Ret	8	
	(Thailand) Nattachak Hanjitkasen							7	8					
	(China) Lo Kai Bong											7	14	
	(China) Chen Wei An			Ret	7									
	(Hong Kong) William O'Brien					7	Ret							
	(China) Qi Pei Wen (China) Zhou Hao Wen									11	13	11	15	
	(China) He Xiao Le (China) Lu Chuan									12	14			
	(China) Cai Hong Yu									Ret	Ret	Ret	13	
	(China) Hu Hao									15	17	14	Ret	
	(China) Li Lin									Ret	15			
	(Thailand) Rattanin Leenutaphong							Ret	Ret					
	(China) Bai Ya Xin									Ret	Ret			
	(Thailand) Kittipol Ayudhya							Ret	DNS					
Pos.	Driver	SEP (Malaysia)		ZHU (China)		ZHU (China)		BNG† (Thailand)		SHA (China)		ZHE (China)		Pts.

Colour	Result
Gold	Winner
Silver	Second place
Bronze	Third place
Green	Points classification
Blue	Non-points classification
Blue	Non-classified finish (NC)
Purple	Retired, not classified (Ret)
Red	Did not qualify (DNQ)
Red	Did not pre-qualify (DNPQ)
Black	Disqualified (DSQ)
White	Did not start (DNS)
White	Withdrew (WD)
White	Race cancelled (C)
Blank	Did not practice (DNP)
Blank	Did not arrive (DNA)
Blank	Excluded (EX)

**Bold** – Pole

Italics – Fastest Lap

=== Teams' championship ===
Pos.	Team	SEP (Malaysia)		ZHU (China)		ZHU (China)		BNG† (Thailand)		SHA (China)		ZHE (China)		Pts.
Pos.	Team	RD1	RD2	RD1	RD2	RD1	RD2	RD1	RD2	RD1	RD2	RD1	RD2	Pts.
1	(Germany) Liqui Moly Team Engstler	1^{1}	1	2^{3}	4	3^{1}	6	Ret^{1}	2	1^{1}	1	4	3	357
1	(Germany) Liqui Moly Team Engstler	2^{2}	9	4	8	9^{4}	NC	Ret^{5}	7	2^{2}	2	13	4	357
2	(Malaysia) R Engineering	4	2	6^{2}	3	1^{2}	4	2^{4}	8	9^{3}	8	9	5	272
2	(Malaysia) R Engineering	6	3	8^{5}	6	2^{3}	7	Ret	Ret	16	9	15	Ret	272
3	Team Thailand	3^{3}	5	5^{4}	1	Ret	Ret	1^{2}	1	4^{5}	6	10	1	176,5
4	(Macau) Elegant Racing Team	7	7	9	9	5	1	8	4	8	11	6	10	165,5
4	(Macau) Elegant Racing Team	Ret^{5}	DNS	10	Ret	6	2	Ret	Ret	Ret	16	DNS	12	165,5
5	Audi Hong Kong	5^{4}	4	1^{1}	11	4^{5}	3	6^{3}	6	13	10	Ret	11	136
5	Audi Hong Kong			Ret	12	Ret	Ret	DSQ	Ret					136
6	(Malaysia) Viper Niza Racing	9	8	11	10	8	5	Ret	Ret	14^{4}	12	Ret	16	46
7	(Hong Kong) Phoenix Racing Asia	8	6	Ret	Ret									12
Teams ineligible to score points
	(China) Teamwork Motorsport									6	3	1	6	
	(China) Teamwork Motorsport									7	4	12	8	
	(China) New Faster Team									3	5	2	2	
	(China) New Faster Team									5	7	3	7	
	Macau David Racing Team			7	2									
	(Thailand) Morin Racing Team							4	3					
	(China) TianShi Racing Team			3	5									
	(China) TianShi Racing Team			Ret	7									
	(Thailand) RMI Racing Team By Sunoco							3	5					
	(China) Leo 109 Racing									15	15	5	9	
	(China) Leo 109 Racing									Ret	17	14	Ret	
	(Thailand) Billionaire Boy Racing							5	Ret					
	(Thailand) TBN MK Ihere Racing Team							7	8					
	(China) HE Racing									12	14	7	14	
	(Malaysia) Viper Niza Racing					7	Ret							
	(China) AVM Racing									11	13	11	15	
	(China) Linky Racing Team									Ret	Ret	Ret	13	
	(Thailand) Yontrakit Racing							Ret	Ret					
	Singha Motorsport Team Thailand							Ret	DNS					
Pos.	Driver	SEP (Malaysia)		ZHU (China)		ZHU (China)		BNG† (Thailand)		SHA (China)		ZHE (China)		Pts.

Colour	Result
Gold	Winner
Silver	Second place
Bronze	Third place
Green	Points classification
Blue	Non-points classification
Blue	Non-classified finish (NC)
Purple	Retired, not classified (Ret)
Red	Did not qualify (DNQ)
Red	Did not pre-qualify (DNPQ)
Black	Disqualified (DSQ)
White	Did not start (DNS)
White	Withdrew (WD)
White	Race cancelled (C)
Blank	Did not practice (DNP)
Blank	Did not arrive (DNA)
Blank	Excluded (EX)

**Bold** – Pole

Italics – Fastest Lap

=== Car model of the year ===
Pos.	Team	SEP (Malaysia)		ZHU (China)		ZHU (China)		BNG† (Thailand)		SHA (China)		ZHE (China)		Pts.
Pos.	Team	RD1	RD2	RD1	RD2	RD1	RD2	RD1	RD2	RD1	RD2	RD1	RD2	Pts.
1	Honda Civic TCR	4	2	5	1	1	4	1	1	4	6	9	1	384.5
1	Honda Civic TCR	6	3	6	3	2	7	2	8	9	8	10	5	384.5
2	Volkswagen Golf GTi TCR	1	1	2	4	3	6	Ret	2	1	1	4	3	371
2	Volkswagen Golf GTi TCR	2	5	4	8	9	NC	Ret	7	2	2	13	4	371
3	SEAT León TCR	7	7	9	9	5	1	8	4	8	11	6	10	205.5
3	SEAT León TCR	9	8	10	10	6	2	Ret	Ret	14	12	Ret	12	205.5
4	Audi RS3 LMS TCR	5	4	1	11	4	3	6	6	13	10	Ret	11	160
4	Audi RS3 LMS TCR	8	6	Ret	12	Ret	Ret	DSQ	Ret					160
Pos.	Driver	SEP (Malaysia)		ZHU (China)		ZHU (China)		BNG† (Thailand)		SHA (China)		ZHE (China)		Pts.
