= 2022 12 Hours of Mugello =

Edition of a motorsport race

The layout of the Mugello Circuit.

The 2022 Hankook 12 Hours of Mugello was the 8th running of the 12 Hours of Mugello. It was also 2nd round of the 2022 24H GT and 2022 TCE Series. The race was won by Samantha Tan, Bryson Morris, and Nick Wittmer in the #1 ST Racing BMW M4 GT3.

== Schedule ==
Date	Time (local: CEST)	Event	Distance
Friday, 25 March	13:25 - 14:25	Practice (Both classes)	60 mins
Friday, 25 March	17:15 - 17:55	Qualifying - TCE & GT4	40 Mins
Friday, 25 March	18:00 - 18:40	Qualifying - GT	40 Mins
Saturday, 26 March	13:00 - 18:30	Race (Part 1)	5 hours 30 Mins
Sunday, 27 March	09:00 - 15:30	Race (Part 2)	6 hours 30 mins

== Entry list ==
40 cars were entered into the event; 32 GT cars and 8 TCEs.

Team	Car	Engine	No.	Drivers	Driver class
GT3 (4 entries)
(Switzerland) Kessel Racing	Ferrari 488 GT3	Ferrari 3.9L F154 CB V8	8	(Italy) L.M.D.V (Italy) Marco Frezza (Italy) David Fumanelli (Italy) Alessandro Cutrera (Italy) Marco Talarico	SEMI PRO; SEMI PRO; SEMI PRO; AM; AM
(New Zealand) Earl Bamber Motorsport	Porsche 911 GT3 (991.2)	Porsche 4.0L MA1.76/MDG.G flat six	61	(Malaysia) Adrian D'Silva (New Zealand) Matthew Payne (New Zealand) Reid Harker	AM; SEMI PRO; SEMI PRO
(Lithuania) JUTA Racing	Audi R8 LMS Evo I	Audi 5.2L FSI V10	71	(Lithuania) Julius Adomavičius (Lithuania) Andrius Gelžinis (Lithuania) Jonas Gelžinis	SEMI PRO; AM; SEMI PRO
(Germany) Herberth Motorsport	Porsche 911 GT3 (991.2)	Porsche 4.0L MA1.76/MDG.G flat six	91	(Switzerland) Daniel Allemann (Germany) Ralf Bohn (Germany) Alfred Renauer (Germany) Robert Renauer	AM; AM+ SEMI PRO; PRO
GT3-Pro/Am (3 entries)
(Canada) ST Racing	BMW M4 GT3	BMW 3.0L S58B30T0 inline six	1	(Canada) Samantha Tan (United States) Bryson Morris (Canada) Nick Wittmer	AM; AM+ SEMI PRO
(Germany) Phoenix Racing	Audi R8 LMS Evo II	Audi 5.2L FSI V10	18	(Austria) Michael Doppelmayr (Germany) Pierre Kaffer (Germany) Elia Erhart (Germany) Swen Herberger	AM; PRO; AM+ AM
(Lithuania) JUTA Racing Junior	Audi R8 LMS Evo I	Audi 5.2L FSI V10	72	(Lithuania) Audrius Navickas (Lithuania) Aurimas Jablonskis (Lithuania) Ignas Gelžinis	AM; AM; AM
GT3-Am (7 entries)
(Italy) MP Racing	Mercedes-AMG GT3	Mercedes-Benz 6.2L M159 V8	58	(Italy) Thomas Gostner (Italy) David Gostner (Italy) Corinna Gostner (Italy) Giorgio Sernagiotto	AM; AM; AM; SEMI PRO
(United States) CP Racing	Mercedes-AMG GT3	Mercedes-Benz 6.2L M159 V8	85	(United States) Charles Putman (United States) Charles Espenlaub (United States) Joe Foster	AM; AM+ AM
(Netherlands) JR Motorsport	BMW M6 GT3	BMW 4.4L S63B44T0 inline six	2	(Netherlands) Ted van Vliet (Netherlands) Ruud Olij	AM; AM
(Netherlands) BoDa by Bas Koeten Racing	Bentley Continental GT3	Bentley 4.0L TFSI V8	6	(Netherlands) Bob Herber (Netherlands) Marcel van Berlo	AM; AM
(Germany) MANN-FILTER Team LANDGRAF	Mercedes-AMG GT3	Mercedes-Benz 6.2L M159 V8	25	(Austria) Alexander Hrachowina (Austria) Martin Konrad (Germany) Bernd Schneider	AM; AM; SEMI PRO
(Germany) Car Collection Motorsport	Audi R8 LMS Evo II	Audi 5.2L FSI V10	34	(Germany) Johannes Dr. Kirchhoff (Germany) Elmar Grimm (Norway) Wiggo Dalmo	AM; AM; AM
(France) Saintéloc Racing	Audi R8 LMS Evo II	Audi 5.2L FSI V10	26	(France) Olivier Esteves (Belgium) Pierre-Yves Paque (Belgium) Christian Kelders (France) Simon Gachet	AM; AM; AM; SEMI PRO
GTX (5 entries)
(France) Vortex V8	Vortex 1.0 GTX	Chevrolet 6.2L LS3 V8	701	(France) Lionel Amrouche (France) Philippe Bonnel (France) Sebastien Lajoux	AM; AM; AM
(France) Vortex V8	Vortex 1.0 GTX	Chevrolet 6.2L LS3 V8	702	(France) Patrick Brochier (France) Gilles Courtois (Switzerland) Nicolas Nobs	AM; AM; AM
(France) Vortex V8	Vortex 1.0 GTX	Chevrolet 6.2L LS3 V8	703	(France) Pierre Fontaine (France) Christophe Decultot (France) Philippe Gruau	AM; AM; AM
(Germany) HRT Performance	Porsche 911 GT3 (992)	Porsche 4.0L MA1.76/MDG.G flat six	728	(China) Kerong Li (United States) Jean-Francois Brunot	AM; SEMI PRO
(Lithuania) RD Signs - Siauliai racing team	Lamborghini Huracán Super Trofeo	Lamborghini 5.2L FSI V10	720	(Lithuania) Audrius Butkevicius (Italy) Nicola Michelon (Lithuania) Paulius Paskevicius	AM; AM; AM
992 (2 entries)
(Netherlands) Red Camel-Jordans.nl	Porsche 911 GT3 (992)	Porsche 4.0L MA1.76/MDG.G flat six	909	(Netherlands) Ivo Breukers (Netherlands) Luc Breukers (Netherlands) Rik Breukers	AM; SEMI PRO; SEMI PRO
(Germany) HRT Performance	Porsche 911 GT3 (992)	Porsche 4.0L MA1.76/MDG.G flat six	929	(Sweden) Gustav Bergström (Sweden) Johan Kristoffersson (Norway) Ole Christian Veiby	AM; PRO; AM
992-Am (6 entries)
(Belgium) Red Ant Racing	Porsche 911 GT3 (992)	Porsche 4.0L MA1.76/MDG.G flat six	903	(Belgium) Ayrton Redant (Belgium) Bert Redant (Belgium) Yannick Redant	AM; AM; AM
(Belgium) Red Ant Racing	Porsche 911 GT3 (992)	Porsche 4.0L MA1.76/MDG.G flat six	904	(Belgium) Philippe Wils (Belgium) Kurt Hensen (Germany) Andreas Mayrl	AM; AM; AM
(France) Porsche Lorient Racing	Porsche 911 GT3 (992)	Porsche 4.0L MA1.76/MDG.G flat six	911	(France) Frédéric Ancel (France) Pascal Gibon (France) Ludovic Loeul (France) Hervé Tremblaye	AM; AM; AM; AM
(France) Porsche Lorient Racing	Porsche 911 GT3 (992)	Porsche 4.0L MA1.76/MDG.G flat six	912	(France) Philippe Polette (France) Frederic Lelievre (France) Jean-François Demorge (France) Gilles Blasco	AM; AM; AM; AM
(Switzerland) Orchid Racing Team	Porsche 911 GT3 (992)	Porsche 4.0L MA1.76/MDG.G flat six	917	(Switzerland) Loic Villiger (Switzerland) Frank Villiger (France) Laurent Misbach (Switzerland) Fabio Spirgi	AM; AM; AM; AM
(Germany) NKPP by HRT Performance	Porsche 911 GT3 (992)	Porsche 4.0L MA1.76/MDG.G flat six	928	(Netherlands) Gijs Bessem (Netherlands) Harry Hilders	AM; AM
991 (3 entries)
(Romania) Willi Motorsport by Ebimotors	Porsche 911 GT3 (991.2)	Porsche 4.0L MA1.76/MDG.G flat six	955	(Italy) Fabrizio Broggi (Italy) Sabino de Castro (Romania) Sergiu Nicolae	AM; SEMI PRO; SEMI PRO
(Italy) EBIMOTORS	Porsche 911 GT3 (991.2)	Porsche 4.0L MA1.76/MDG.G flat six	973	(Italy) Paolo Venerosi (Italy) Gianluca Giorgi (Italy) Gianluigi Piccioli (Italy) Spezz	AM; AM; AM; AM
(Italy) EBIMOTORS	Porsche 911 GT3 (991.2)	Porsche 4.0L MA1.76/MDG.G flat six	974	(Italy) Luigi Peroni (Italy) Pietro Negra (Italy) Massimiliano Donzelli (Italy) Massimiliano Montagnese	AM; AM; AM; AM
GT4 (2 entries)
(Switzerland) Orchid Racing Team	Porsche 718 Cayman GT4 Clubsport Manthey-Racing	Porsche 3.8L MA1.24/MDG.G flat six	417	(Switzerland) Alexandre Mottet (France) Stefan Chaligne (France) Antoine Leclerc (Spain) Antonio Garzon	AM; AM; PRO; AM
(Belgium) Team ACP-Tangerine Associates by VEIDEC JJ Motosport	BMW M4 GT4	BMW 3.0L S58B30T0 inline six	421	(United States) Catesby Jones (Belgium) Wim Spinoy	AM; AM
TCR (4 entries)
(Denmark) Holmgaard Motorsport	Volkswagen Golf GTi TCR DSG	Volkswagen 2.0L EA888 Evo 4 TSI inline-4	102	(Denmark) Magnus Holmgaard (Denmark) Jonas Holmgaard (Norway) Roy Edland (Denmark) Martin Vedel Mortensen	AM; AM; AM; SEMI PRO
(Lithuania) NOKER Racing Team	Volkswagen Golf GTi TCR SEQ	Volkswagen 2.0L EA888 Evo 4 TSI inline-4	104	(Lithuania) Kestutis Stasionis (Estonia) Sten-Dorian Piirimägi (Lithuania) Jonas Karklys (Estonia) Antti Rammo	AM; AM; AM; AM
(Switzerland) Wolf-Power Racing	Audi RS 3 LMS TCR	Volkswagen 2.0L EA888 Evo 4 TSI inline-4	116	(Switzerland) Jasmin Preisig (Germany) Marcus Menden (Latvia) Ivas Vallers	SEMI PRO; AM; AM
(Thailand) BBR	Cupra Leon Competición TCR	Volkswagen 2.0L EA888 Evo 4 TSI inline-4	159	(Thailand) Chariya Nuya (Thailand) Kantadhee Kusiri (Thailand) Kantasak Kusiri (Thailand) Tanart Sathienthirakul	SEMI PRO; SEMI PRO; SEMI PRO; SEMI PRO
TCX (2 entries)
(United Kingdom) Valluga	Porsche 718 Cayman GT4 Clubsport	Porsche 3.8L MA1.24/MDG.G flat six	205	(United Kingdom) Bradley Ellis (Cyprus) Leo Loucas (Cyprus) Rhea Loucas (United Kingdom) Charles Hollings	SEMI PRO; AM; AM; SEMI PRO
(France) SK Racing	Ligier JS2 R	Ford 3.7L Duratec 37 V6	215	(France) Franck Eburderie (France) Franco Lemma (France) Jérôme Dacosta (France) Franck Lavergne	AM; AM; AM; AM
TC (2 entries)
(Switzerland) Hofor Racing by Bonk Motorsport	BMW M2 CS Racing	BMW 3.0L S55B30T0 inline six	331	(Germany) Rainer Partl (Germany) Hermann Bock (Switzerland) Martin Kroll (Germany) Michael Bonk	AM; AM; AM; AM
(Switzerland) Hofor Racing by Bonk Motorsport	BMW M2 CS Racing	BMW 3.0L S55B30T0 inline six	332	(Germany) Michael Mayer (Germany) Volker Piepmeyer (Germany) Jürgen Meyer (Germany) Michael Bonk	AM; AM; AM; AM

== Results ==
=== Qualifying ===
Qualifying this year was split into three qualifying sessions, and the average of their best times per qualifying session being used as the final benchmark to determine starting order.

==== TCE ====
Fastest in class in bold.

Pos.	Class	No.	Team	Q1	Q2	Q3	Avg
1	TCR	**159**	(Thailand) **BBR**	1:59.294	1:57.294	1:57.478	**1:58.022**
2	TCR	104	(Lithuania) NOKER Racing Team	1:59.477	1:59.542	1:58.728	1:59.249
3	TCR	116	(Switzerland) Wolf-Power Racing	2:01.732	2:01.778	1:58.522	2:00.677
4	GT4	**417**	(Switzerland) **Orchid Racing Team**	2:02.573	2:01.128	1:58.793	**2:00.831**
5	TCR	102	(Denmark) Holmgaard Motorsport	2:00.535	2:00.936	2:01.350	2:00.940
6	GT4	421	(Germany) Team ACP-Tangerine Associates by VEIDEC JJ Motosport	2:00.434	2:02.847	2:01.689	2:01.656
7	TCX	**205**	(United Kingdom) **Valluga**	2:07.358	2:01.155	1:58.216	**2:02.243**
8	TCX	215	(France) SK Racing	2:02.467	2:01.767	2:02.962	2:02.398
9	TC	**331**	(Switzerland) **Hofor Racing by Bonk Motorsport**	2:09.412	2:08.201	2:11.833	**2:09.815**
10	TC	332	(Switzerland) Hofor Racing by Bonk Motorsport	2:09.115	2:12.772	2:21.752	2:14.546

==== GT ====
Fastest in class in bold.

Pos.	Class	No.	Team	Q1	Q2	Q3	Avg
1	GT3-Pro/Am	**18**	(Germany) **Phoenix Racing**	1:49.041	1:48.709	1:47.337	**1:48.362**
2	GT3-Pro/Am	1	(Canada) ST Racing	1:49.883	1:48.777	1:47.525	1:48.728
3	GT3-Am	**25**	(Germany) **MANN-FILTER Team LANDGRAF**	1:50.035	1:49.191	1:49.359	**1:49.528**
4	GT3	**91**	(Germany) **Herberth Motorsport**	1:49.987	1:49.503	1:49.491	**1:49.660**
5	GT3	8	(Switzerland) Kessel Racing	1:51.936	1:50.015	1:48.068	1:50.006
6	GT3	61	(New Zealand) Earl Bamber Motorsport	1:52.902	1:49.576	1:48.780	1:50.419
7	GT3-Am	85	(United States) CP Racing	1:51.881	1:51.886	1:49.191	1:50.986
8	GT3-Am	6	(Switzerland) BoDa by Bas Koeten Racing	1:50.121	1:50.089	1:53.391	1:51.200
9	GT3	71	(Lithuania) JUTA Racing	1:53.697	1:50.708	1:51.308	1:51.904
10	GT3-Am	34	(Germany) Car Collection Motorsport	1:52.807	1:52.901	1:50.944	1:52.217
11	GT3-Am	58	(Italy) MP Racing	1:57.125	1:51.734	1:48.137	1:52.332
12	GT3-Am	26	(France) Saintéloc Racing	1:51.633	1:53.325	1:53.622	1:52.860
13	992	**929**	(Germany) **HRT Motorsport**	1:53.841	1:53.883	1:51.684	**1:53.136**
14	992-Am	**903**	(Belgium) **Red Ant Racing**	1:54.965	1:53.082	1:53.330	**1:53.792**
15	991	**955**	(Romania) **Willi Motorsport by Ebimotors**	1:56.323	1:54.347	1:53.051	**1:54.573**
16	GT3-Pro/Am	72	(Lithuania) JUTA Racing Junior	1:57.386	1:53.703	1:53.126	1:54.738
17	992-Am	917	(Switzerland) Orchid Racing Team	1:56.041	1:55.741	1:52.469	1:54.750
18	992	909	(Netherlands) Red Camel-Jordans.nl	1:54.655	1:56.115	1:54.078	1:54.949
19	GT3-Am	2	(Netherlands) JR Motorsport	1:53.429	1:53.805	1:58.254	1:55.162
20	GTX	**720**	(Lithuania) **Siauliai - RD Signs racing team**	1:57.852	1:56.063	1:52.634	**1:55.516**
21	992-Am	928	(Germany) NKPP by HRT Performance	1:54.896	1:55.532	1:56.436	1:55.621
22	992-Am	911	(France) Porsche Lorient Racing	1:53.768	1:57.447	1:55.858	1:55.691
23	992-Am	904	(Belgium) Red Ant Racing	1:55.137	1:59.348	1:54.560	1:56.348
24	GTX	728	(Germany) HRT Performance	1:56.096	1:55.175	1:57.903	1:56.391
25	991	973	(Italy) Ebimotors	1:56.575	1:58.289	1:55.519	1:56.794
26	991	974	(Italy) Ebimotors	1:57.036	1:56.773	1:56.841	1:56.883
27	992-Am	912	(France) Porsche Lorient Racing	1:54.787	2:02.983	2:04.871	2:00.880
28	GTX	703	(France) Vortex V8	2:11.033	1:59.579	1:59.750	2:01.439
29	GTX	702	(France) Vortex V8	2:05.695	2:03.631	2:04.467	2:04.597
30	GTX	701	(France) Vortex V8	1:56.359	1:57.513	No time (Note: The No. 701 suffered from power issues in the third qualifying session and could not set a time.)	1:56.936

=== Race ===
==== Part 1 ====
Class winner in bold.

Pos	Class	No.	Team	Drivers	Car	Time/Reason	Laps
Pos	Class	No.	Team	Drivers	Engine	Time/Reason	Laps
1	**GT3-Pro/Am**	**1**	**(Canada) ST Racing**	**(Canada) Samantha Tan (United States) Bryson Morris (Canada) Nick Wittmer**	**BMW M4 GT3**	**5:31.38.021**	**147**
1	**GT3-Pro/Am**	**1**	**(Canada) ST Racing**	**(Canada) Samantha Tan (United States) Bryson Morris (Canada) Nick Wittmer**	**BMW 3.0L S58B30T0 inline six**	**5:31.38.021**	**147**
2	**GT3-Am**	**25**	**(Germany) MANN-FILTER Team LANDGRAF**	**(Austria) Alexander Hrachowina (Austria) Martin Konrad (Germany) Bernd Schneider**	**Mercedes-AMG GT3**	**+1:08.968**	**147**
2	**GT3-Am**	**25**	**(Germany) MANN-FILTER Team LANDGRAF**	**(Austria) Alexander Hrachowina (Austria) Martin Konrad (Germany) Bernd Schneider**	**Mercedes-Benz 6.2L M159 V8**	**+1:08.968**	**147**
3	GT3-Pro/Am	18	(Germany) Phoenix Racing	(Austria) Michael Doppelmayr (Germany) Pierre Kaffer (Germany) Elia Erhart (Germany) Swen Herberger	Audi R8 LMS Evo II	+1:10.471	147
3	GT3-Pro/Am	18	(Germany) Phoenix Racing	(Austria) Michael Doppelmayr (Germany) Pierre Kaffer (Germany) Elia Erhart (Germany) Swen Herberger	Audi 5.2L FSI V10	+1:10.471	147
4	**GT3**	**72**	**(Lithuania) JUTA Racing**	**(Lithuania) Julius Adomavičius (Lithuania) Andrius Gelžinis (Lithuania) Ignas Gelžinis**	**Audi R8 LMS Evo I**	**+2 laps**	**145**
4	**GT3**	**72**	**(Lithuania) JUTA Racing**	**(Lithuania) Julius Adomavičius (Lithuania) Andrius Gelžinis (Lithuania) Ignas Gelžinis**	**Audi 5.2L FSI V10**	**+2 laps**	**145**
5	GT3	8	(Switzerland) Kessel Racing	(Italy) L.M.D.V (Italy) Marco Frezza (Italy) David Fumanelli (Italy) Alessandro Cutrera (Italy) Marco Talarico	Ferrari 488 GT3	+2 laps	145
5	GT3	8	(Switzerland) Kessel Racing	(Italy) L.M.D.V (Italy) Marco Frezza (Italy) David Fumanelli (Italy) Alessandro Cutrera (Italy) Marco Talarico	Ferrari 3.9L F154 CB V8	+2 laps	145
6	GT3-Am	85	(United States) CP Racing	(United States) Charles Putman (United States) Charles Espenlaub (United States) Joe Foster	Mercedes-AMG GT3	+2 laps	145
6	GT3-Am	85	(United States) CP Racing	(United States) Charles Putman (United States) Charles Espenlaub (United States) Joe Foster	Mercedes-Benz 6.2L M159 V8	+2 laps	145
7	GT3-Am	58	(Italy) MP Racing	(Italy) Thomas Gostner (Italy) David Gostner (Italy) Corinna Gostner (Italy) Giorgio Sernagiotto	Mercedes-AMG GT3	+3 laps	144
7	GT3-Am	58	(Italy) MP Racing	(Italy) Thomas Gostner (Italy) David Gostner (Italy) Corinna Gostner (Italy) Giorgio Sernagiotto	Mercedes-Benz 6.2L M159 V8	+3 laps	144
8	GT3	91	(Germany) Herberth Motorsport	(Switzerland) Daniel Allemann (Germany) Ralf Bohn (Germany) Alfred Renauer (Germany) Robert Renauer	Porsche 911 GT3 (991.2)	+4 laps	143
8	GT3	91	(Germany) Herberth Motorsport	(Switzerland) Daniel Allemann (Germany) Ralf Bohn (Germany) Alfred Renauer (Germany) Robert Renauer	Porsche 4.0L MA1.76/MDG.G flat six	+4 laps	143
9	GT3-Am	85	(New Zealand) Earl Bamber Motorsport	(Malaysia) Adrian D'Silva (New Zealand) Matthew Payne (New Zealand) Reid Harker	Mercedes-AMG GT3 Evo	+4 laps	143
9	GT3-Am	85	(New Zealand) Earl Bamber Motorsport	(Malaysia) Adrian D'Silva (New Zealand) Matthew Payne (New Zealand) Reid Harker	Mercedes-AMG M159 6.2 L V8	+4 laps	143
10	GT3-Am	26	(France) Saintéloc Racing	(France) Olivier Esteves (Belgium) Pierre-Yves Paque (Belgium) Christian Kelders (France) Simon Gachet	Audi R8 LMS Evo II	+4 laps	143
10	GT3-Am	26	(France) Saintéloc Racing	(France) Olivier Esteves (Belgium) Pierre-Yves Paque (Belgium) Christian Kelders (France) Simon Gachet	Audi 5.2L FSI V10	+4 laps	143
11	**992**	**909**	**(Netherlands) Red Camel-Jordans.nl**	**(Netherlands) Ivo Breukers (Netherlands) Luc Breukers (Netherlands) Rik Breukers**	**Porsche 911 GT3 (992)**	**+5 laps**	**142**
11	**992**	**909**	**(Netherlands) Red Camel-Jordans.nl**	**(Netherlands) Ivo Breukers (Netherlands) Luc Breukers (Netherlands) Rik Breukers**	**Porsche 4.0L MA1.76/MDG.G flat six**	**+5 laps**	**142**
12	992	929	(Germany) HRT Performance	(Sweden) Gustav Bergström (Sweden) Johan Kristoffersson (Norway) Ole Christian Veiby	Porsche 911 GT3 (992)	+5 laps	142
12	992	929	(Germany) HRT Performance	(Sweden) Gustav Bergström (Sweden) Johan Kristoffersson (Norway) Ole Christian Veiby	Porsche 4.0L MA1.76/MDG.G flat six	+5 laps	142
13	**GTX**	**720**	**(Lithuania) RD Signs - Siauliai racing team**	**(Lithuania) Audrius Butkevicius (Italy) Nicola Michelon (Lithuania) Paulius Paskevicius**	**Lamborghini Huracán Super Trofeo**	**+6 laps**	**141**
13	**GTX**	**720**	**(Lithuania) RD Signs - Siauliai racing team**	**(Lithuania) Audrius Butkevicius (Italy) Nicola Michelon (Lithuania) Paulius Paskevicius**	**Lamborghini 5.2L FSI V10**	**+6 laps**	**141**
14	GT3-Pro/Am	72	(Lithuania) JUTA Racing Junior	(Lithuania) Audrius Navickas (Lithuania) Aurimas Jablonskis (Lithuania) Ignas Gelžinis	Audi R8 LMS Evo I	+6 laps	141
14	GT3-Pro/Am	72	(Lithuania) JUTA Racing Junior	(Lithuania) Audrius Navickas (Lithuania) Aurimas Jablonskis (Lithuania) Ignas Gelžinis	Audi 5.2L FSI V10	+6 laps	141
15	992-Am	903	(Belgium) Red Ant Racing	(Belgium) Ayrton Redant (Belgium) Bert Redant (Belgium) Yannick Redant	Porsche 911 GT3 (992)	+6 laps	141
15	992-Am	903	(Belgium) Red Ant Racing	(Belgium) Ayrton Redant (Belgium) Bert Redant (Belgium) Yannick Redant	Porsche 4.0L MA1.76/MDG.G flat six	+6 laps	141
16	992-Am	917	(Switzerland) Orchid Racing Team	(Switzerland) Loic Villiger (Switzerland) Frank Villiger (France) Laurent Misbach (Switzerland) Fabio Spirgi	Porsche 911 GT3 (992)	+7 laps	140
16	992-Am	917	(Switzerland) Orchid Racing Team	(Switzerland) Loic Villiger (Switzerland) Frank Villiger (France) Laurent Misbach (Switzerland) Fabio Spirgi	Porsche 4.0L MA1.76/MDG.G flat six	+7 laps	140
17	GT3-Am	2	(Netherlands) JR Motorsport	(Netherlands) Ted van Vliet (Netherlands) Ruud Olij	BMW M6 GT3	+7 laps	140
17	GT3-Am	2	(Netherlands) JR Motorsport	(Netherlands) Ted van Vliet (Netherlands) Ruud Olij	BMW 4.4L S63B44T0 V8	+7 laps	140
18	992-Am	904	(Belgium) Red Ant Racing	(Belgium) Philippe Wils (Belgium) Kurt Hensen (Germany) Andreas Mayrl	Porsche 911 GT3 (992)	+7 laps	140
18	992-Am	904	(Belgium) Red Ant Racing	(Belgium) Philippe Wils (Belgium) Kurt Hensen (Germany) Andreas Mayrl	Porsche 4.0L MA1.76/MDG.G flat six	+7 laps	140
19	992-Am	928	(Germany) NKPP by HRT Performance	(Netherlands) Gijs Bessem (Netherlands) Harry Hilders	Porsche 911 GT3 (992)	+8 laps	139
19	992-Am	928	(Germany) NKPP by HRT Performance	(Netherlands) Gijs Bessem (Netherlands) Harry Hilders	Porsche 4.0L MA1.76/MDG.G flat six	+8 laps	139
20	**991**	**974**	**(Italy) EBIMOTORS**	**(Italy) Luigi Peroni (Italy) Pietro Negra (Italy) Massimiliano Donzelli (Italy) Massimiliano Montagnese**	**Porsche 911 GT3 (992)**	**+9 laps**	**138**
20	**991**	**974**	**(Italy) EBIMOTORS**	**(Italy) Luigi Peroni (Italy) Pietro Negra (Italy) Massimiliano Donzelli (Italy) Massimiliano Montagnese**	**Porsche 4.0L MA1.76/MDG.G flat six**	**+9 laps**	**138**
21	991	973	(Italy) EBIMOTORS	(Italy) Paolo Venerosi (Italy) Gianluca Giorgi (Italy) Gianluigi Piccioli (Italy) Spezz	Porsche 911 GT3 (992)	+9 laps	138
21	991	973	(Italy) EBIMOTORS	(Italy) Paolo Venerosi (Italy) Gianluca Giorgi (Italy) Gianluigi Piccioli (Italy) Spezz	Porsche 4.0L MA1.76/MDG.G flat six	+9 laps	138
22	GTX	728	(Germany) HRT Performance	(China) Kerong Li (United States) Jean-Francois Brunot	Porsche 911 GT3 (992)	+9 laps	138
22	GTX	728	(Germany) HRT Performance	(China) Kerong Li (United States) Jean-Francois Brunot	Porsche 4.0L MA1.76/MDG.G flat six	+9 laps	138
23	**TCR**	**159**	**(Thailand) BBR**	**(Thailand) Chariya Nuya (Thailand) Kantadhee Kusiri (Thailand) Kantasak Kusiri (Thailand) Tanart Sathienthirakul**	**Cupra Leon Competición TCR**	**+10 laps**	**137**
23	**TCR**	**159**	**(Thailand) BBR**	**(Thailand) Chariya Nuya (Thailand) Kantadhee Kusiri (Thailand) Kantasak Kusiri (Thailand) Tanart Sathienthirakul**	**Volkswagen 2.0L EA888 Evo 4 TSI inline-4**	**+10 laps**	**137**
24	992-Am	911	(France) Porsche Lorient Racing	(France) Frédéric Ancel (France) Pascal Gibon (France) Ludovic Loeul (France) Hervé Tremblaye	Porsche 911 GT3 (992)	+11 laps	136
24	992-Am	911	(France) Porsche Lorient Racing	(France) Frédéric Ancel (France) Pascal Gibon (France) Ludovic Loeul (France) Hervé Tremblaye	Porsche 4.0L MA1.76/MDG.G flat six	+11 laps	136
25	**TCR**	**102**	**(Denmark) Holmgaard Motorsport**	**(Denmark) Magnus Holmgaard (Denmark) Jonas Holmgaard (Norway) Roy Edland (Denmark) Martin Vedel Mortensen**	**Volkswagen Golf GTi TCR DSG**	**+11 laps**	**136**
25	**TCR**	**102**	**(Denmark) Holmgaard Motorsport**	**(Denmark) Magnus Holmgaard (Denmark) Jonas Holmgaard (Norway) Roy Edland (Denmark) Martin Vedel Mortensen**	**Volkswagen 2.0L EA888 Evo 4 TSI inline four**	**+11 laps**	**136**
26	TCR	116	(Switzerland) Wolf-Power Racing	(Switzerland) Jasmin Preisig (Germany) Marcus Menden (Latvia) Ivas Vallers	Audi RS 3 LMS TCR	+12 laps	135
26	TCR	116	(Switzerland) Wolf-Power Racing	(Switzerland) Jasmin Preisig (Germany) Marcus Menden (Latvia) Ivas Vallers	Volkswagen 2.0L EA888 Evo 4 TSI inline four	+12 laps	135
27	GT3-Am	34	(Germany) Car Collection Motorsport	(Germany) Johannes Dr. Kirchhoff (Germany) Elmar Grimm (Norway) Wiggo Dalmo	Audi R8 LMS Evo II	+13 laps	134
27	GT3-Am	34	(Germany) Car Collection Motorsport	(Germany) Johannes Dr. Kirchhoff (Germany) Elmar Grimm (Norway) Wiggo Dalmo	Audi 5.2L FSI V10	+13 laps	134
28	**GT4**	**417**	**(Switzerland) Orchid Racing Team**	**(Switzerland) Alexandre Mottet (France) Stefan Chaligne (France) Antoine Leclerc (Spain) Antonio Garzon**	**Porsche 718 Cayman GT4 Clubsport Manthey-Racing**	**+14 laps**	**133**
28	**GT4**	**417**	**(Switzerland) Orchid Racing Team**	**(Switzerland) Alexandre Mottet (France) Stefan Chaligne (France) Antoine Leclerc (Spain) Antonio Garzon**	**Porsche 3.8L MA1.24/MDG.G flat-six**	**+14 laps**	**133**
29	TCR	104	(Lithuania) NOKER Racing Team	(Lithuania) Kestutis Stasionis (Estonia) Sten-Dorian Piirimägi (Lithuania) Jonas Karklys (Estonia) Antti Rammo	Volkswagen Golf GTi TCR SEQ	+15 laps	132
29	TCR	104	(Lithuania) NOKER Racing Team	(Lithuania) Kestutis Stasionis (Estonia) Sten-Dorian Piirimägi (Lithuania) Jonas Karklys (Estonia) Antti Rammo	Volkswagen 2.0L EA888 Evo 4 TSI inline four	+15 laps	132
30	**TCX**	**205**	**(United Kingdom) Valluga**	**(United Kingdom) Bradley Ellis (Cyprus) Leo Loucas (Cyprus) Rhea Loucas (United Kingdom) Charles Hollings**	**Porsche 718 Cayman GT4 Clubsport**	**+15 laps**	**132**
30	**TCX**	**205**	**(United Kingdom) Valluga**	**(United Kingdom) Bradley Ellis (Cyprus) Leo Loucas (Cyprus) Rhea Loucas (United Kingdom) Charles Hollings**	**Porsche 3.8L MA1.24/MDG.G flat-six**	**+15 laps**	**132**
31	TCX	215	(France) SK Racing	(France) Franck Eburderie (France) Franco Lemma (France) Jérôme Dacosta (France) Franck Lavergne	Ligier JS2 R	+16 laps	131
31	TCX	215	(France) SK Racing	(France) Franck Eburderie (France) Franco Lemma (France) Jérôme Dacosta (France) Franck Lavergne	Ford 3.7L Duratec 37 V6	+16 laps	131
32	GT4	421	(Germany) Team ACP-Tangerine Associates by VEIDEC JJ Motosport	(United States) Catesby Jones (Belgium) Wim Spinoy	BMW M4 GT4	+17 Laps	130
32	GT4	421	(Germany) Team ACP-Tangerine Associates by VEIDEC JJ Motosport	(United States) Catesby Jones (Belgium) Wim Spinoy	BMW 3.0L S58B30T0 inline six	+17 Laps	130
33	992-Am	912	(France) Porsche Lorient Racing	(France) Philippe Polette (France) Frederic Lelievre (France) Jean-François Demorge (France) Gilles Blasco	Porsche 911 GT3 (992)	+19 laps	128
33	992-Am	912	(France) Porsche Lorient Racing	(France) Philippe Polette (France) Frederic Lelievre (France) Jean-François Demorge (France) Gilles Blasco	Porsche 4.0L MA1.76/MDG.G flat six	+19 laps	128
34	GTX	703	(France) Vortex V8	(France) Pierre Fontaine (France) Christophe Decultot (France) Philippe Gruau	Vortex 1.0 GTX	+24 laps	123
34	GTX	703	(France) Vortex V8	(France) Pierre Fontaine (France) Christophe Decultot (France) Philippe Gruau	Chevrolet 6.2L LS3 V8	+24 laps	123
35	TC	332	(Switzerland) Hofor Racing by Bonk Motorsport	(Germany) Michael Mayer (Germany) Volker Piepmeyer (Germany) Jürgen Meyer (Germany) Michael Bonk	BMW M2 CS Racing	+25 laps	121
35	TC	332	(Switzerland) Hofor Racing by Bonk Motorsport	(Germany) Michael Mayer (Germany) Volker Piepmeyer (Germany) Jürgen Meyer (Germany) Michael Bonk	BMW 3.0L S55B30T0 inline six	+25 laps	121
36	GT3-Am	6	(Netherlands) BoDa by Bas Koten Racing	(Netherlands) Bob Herber (Netherlands) Marcel van Berlo	Bentley Continental GT3	+31 laps	116
36	GT3-Am	6	(Netherlands) BoDa by Bas Koten Racing	(Netherlands) Bob Herber (Netherlands) Marcel van Berlo	Bentley 4.0L TFSI V8	+31 laps	116
37	GTX	701	(France) Vortex V8	(France) Lionel Amrouche (France) Philippe Bonnel (France) Sebastien Lajoux	Vortex 1.0 GTX	+38 laps	109
37	GTX	701	(France) Vortex V8	(France) Lionel Amrouche (France) Philippe Bonnel (France) Sebastien Lajoux	Chevrolet 6.2L LS3 V8	+38 laps	109
DNF	GTX	702	(France) Vortex V8	(France) Patrick Brochier (France) Gilles Courtois (Switzerland) Nicolas Nobs	Vortex 1.0 GTX	Accident	89
DNF	GTX	702	(France) Vortex V8	(France) Patrick Brochier (France) Gilles Courtois (Switzerland) Nicolas Nobs	Chevrolet 6.2L LS3 V8	Accident	89
39	TC	331	(Switzerland) Hofor Racing by Bonk Motorsport	(Germany) Rainer Partl (Germany) Hermann Bock (Switzerland) Martin Kroll (Germany) Michael Bonk	BMW M2 CS Racing	+61 laps (Note: The No. 331 lost time early on and had to come in for repairs following a collision with the No. 34 Car Collection Audi R8 LMS Evo II)	86
39	TC	331	(Switzerland) Hofor Racing by Bonk Motorsport	(Germany) Rainer Partl (Germany) Hermann Bock (Switzerland) Martin Kroll (Germany) Michael Bonk	BMW 3.0L S55B30T0 inline six	+61 laps	86
DNF	991	955	(Romania) Willi Motorsport by Ebimotors	(Italy) Fabrizio Broggi (Italy) Sabino de Castro (Romania) Sergiu Nicolae	Porsche 911 GT3 (991.2)	Accident	81
DNF	991	955	(Romania) Willi Motorsport by Ebimotors	(Italy) Fabrizio Broggi (Italy) Sabino de Castro (Romania) Sergiu Nicolae	Porsche 4.0L MA1.76/MDG.G flat-six	Accident	81

==== Part 2 ====
Class winner in bold.

Pos	Class	No.	Team	Drivers	Chassis	Time/Reason	Laps	Avg.
Pos	Class	No.	Team	Drivers	Engine	Time/Reason	Laps	Avg.
1	**GT3-Pro/Am**	**1**	**(Canada) ST Racing**	**(Canada) Samantha Tan (United States) Bryson Morris (Canada) Nick Wittmer**	**BMW M4 GT3**	**6:30.57.433**	**330**	**147.30**
1	**GT3-Pro/Am**	**1**	**(Canada) ST Racing**	**(Canada) Samantha Tan (United States) Bryson Morris (Canada) Nick Wittmer**	**BMW 3.0L S58B30T0 inline six**	**6:30.57.433**	**330**	**147.30**
2	GT3-Pro/Am	18	(Germany) Phoenix Racing	(Austria) Michael Doppelmayr (Germany) Pierre Kaffer (Germany) Elia Erhart (Germany) Swen Herberger	Audi R8 LMS Evo II	+2 laps	328	145.66
2	GT3-Pro/Am	18	(Germany) Phoenix Racing	(Austria) Michael Doppelmayr (Germany) Pierre Kaffer (Germany) Elia Erhart (Germany) Swen Herberger	Audi 5.2L FSI V10	+2 laps	328	145.66
3	**GT3-Am**	**25**	**(Germany) MANN-FILTER Team LANDGRAF**	**(Austria) Alexander Hrachowina (Austria) Martin Konrad (Germany) Bernd Schneider**	**Mercedes-AMG GT3**	**+2 laps**	**328**	**145.66**
3	**GT3-Am**	**25**	**(Germany) MANN-FILTER Team LANDGRAF**	**(Austria) Alexander Hrachowina (Austria) Martin Konrad (Germany) Bernd Schneider**	**Mercedes-Benz 6.2L M159 V8**	**+2 laps**	**328**	**145.66**
4	GT3-Am	85	(United States) CP Racing	(United States) Charles Putman (United States) Charles Espenlaub (United States) Joe Foster	Mercedes-AMG GT3	+3 laps	327	146.44
4	GT3-Am	85	(United States) CP Racing	(United States) Charles Putman (United States) Charles Espenlaub (United States) Joe Foster	Mercedes-Benz 6.2L M159 V8	+3 laps	327	146.44
5	**GT3**	**71**	**(Lithuania) JUTA Racing**	**(Lithuania) Julius Adomavičius (Lithuania) Andrius Gelžinis (Lithuania) Jonas Gelžinis**	**Audi R8 LMS Evo I**	**+6 laps**	**324**	**143.75**
5	**GT3**	**71**	**(Lithuania) JUTA Racing**	**(Lithuania) Julius Adomavičius (Lithuania) Andrius Gelžinis (Lithuania) Jonas Gelžinis**	**Audi 5.2L FSI V10**	**+6 laps**	**324**	**143.75**
6	GT3-Am	58	(Italy) MP Racing	(Italy) Thomas Gostner (Italy) David Gostner (Italy) Corinna Gostner (Italy) Giorgio Sernagiotto	Mercedes-AMG GT3	+9 laps	321	141.53
6	GT3-Am	58	(Italy) MP Racing	(Italy) Thomas Gostner (Italy) David Gostner (Italy) Corinna Gostner (Italy) Giorgio Sernagiotto	Mercedes-Benz 6.2L M159 V8	+9 laps	321	141.53
7	**992**	**909**	**(Netherlands) Red Camel-Jordans.nl**	**(Netherlands) Ivo Breukers (Netherlands) Luc Breukers (Netherlands) Rik Breukers**	**Porsche 911 GT3 (992)**	**+10 laps**	**320**	**143.23**
7	**992**	**909**	**(Netherlands) Red Camel-Jordans.nl**	**(Netherlands) Ivo Breukers (Netherlands) Luc Breukers (Netherlands) Rik Breukers**	**Porsche 4.0L MA1.76/MDG.G flat six**	**+10 laps**	**320**	**143.23**
8	GT3	8	(Switzerland) Kessel Racing	(Italy) L.M.D.V (Italy) Marco Frezza (Italy) David Fumanelli (Italy) Alessandro Cutrera (Italy) Marco Talarico	Ferrari 488 GT3	+10 laps	320	140.67
8	GT3	8	(Switzerland) Kessel Racing	(Italy) L.M.D.V (Italy) Marco Frezza (Italy) David Fumanelli (Italy) Alessandro Cutrera (Italy) Marco Talarico	Ferrari 3.9 L F154 CB V8	+10 laps	320	140.67
9	992	929	(Germany) HRT Performance	(Sweden) Gustav Bergström (Sweden) Johan Kristoffersson (Norway) Ole Veiby	Porsche 911 GT3 (992)	+10 laps	320	142.64
9	992	929	(Germany) HRT Performance	(Sweden) Gustav Bergström (Sweden) Johan Kristoffersson (Norway) Ole Veiby	Porsche 4.0L MA1.76/MDG.G flat six	+10 laps	320	142.64
10	**992-Am**	**903**	**(Belgium) Red Ant Racing**	**(Belgium) Ayrton Redant (Belgium) Bert Redant (Belgium) Yannick Redant**	**Porsche 911 GT3 (992)**	**+11 laps**	**319**	**142.69**
10	**992-Am**	**903**	**(Belgium) Red Ant Racing**	**(Belgium) Ayrton Redant (Belgium) Bert Redant (Belgium) Yannick Redant**	**Porsche 4.0L MA1.76/MDG.G flat six**	**+11 laps**	**319**	**142.69**
11	992-Am	917	(Switzerland) Orchid Racing Team	(Switzerland) Loic Villiger (Switzerland) Frank Villiger (France) Laurent Misbach (Switzerland) Fabio Spirgi	Porsche 911 GT3 (992)	+14 laps	316	140.61
11	992-Am	917	(Switzerland) Orchid Racing Team	(Switzerland) Loic Villiger (Switzerland) Frank Villiger (France) Laurent Misbach (Switzerland) Fabio Spirgi	Porsche 4.0L MA1.76/MDG.G flat six	+14 laps	316	140.61
12	992-Am	904	(Belgium) Red Ant Racing	(Belgium) Philippe Wils (Belgium) Kurt Hensen (Germany) Andreas Maryl	Porsche 911 GT3 (992)	+14 laps	316	141.09
12	992-Am	904	(Belgium) Red Ant Racing	(Belgium) Philippe Wils (Belgium) Kurt Hensen (Germany) Andreas Maryl	Porsche 4.0L MA1.76/MDG.G flat six	+14 laps	316	141.09
13	992-Am	928	(Germany) NKPP by HRT Performance	(Netherlands) Gijs Bessem (Netherlands) Harry Hilders	Porsche 911 GT3 (992)	+17 laps	313	138.53
13	992-Am	928	(Germany) NKPP by HRT Performance	(Netherlands) Gijs Bessem (Netherlands) Harry Hilders	Porsche 4.0L MA1.76/MDG.G flat six	+17 laps	313	138.53
14	GT3-Am	34	(Germany) Car Collection Motorsport	(Germany) Johannes Dr. Kirchhoff (Germany) Elmar Grimm (Norway) Wiggo Dalmo	Audi R8 LMS Evo II	+18 laps	312	141.91
14	GT3-Am	34	(Germany) Car Collection Motorsport	(Germany) Johannes Dr. Kirchhoff (Germany) Elmar Grimm (Norway) Wiggo Dalmo	Audi 5.2L FSI V10	+18 laps	312	141.91
15	992-Am	911	(France) Porsche Lorient Racing	(France) Frédéric Ancel (France) Pascal Gibon (France) Ludovic Loeul (France) Hervé Tremblaye	Porsche 911 GT3 (992)	+21 laps	309	139.20
15	992-Am	911	(France) Porsche Lorient Racing	(France) Frédéric Ancel (France) Pascal Gibon (France) Ludovic Loeul (France) Hervé Tremblaye	Porsche 4.0L MA1.76/MDG.G flat six	+21 laps	309	139.20
16	**GTX**	**728**	**(Germany) HRT Performance**	**(China) Kerong Li (United States) Jean-Francois Brunot**	**Porsche 911 GT3 (992)**	**+22 laps**	**308**	**136.69**
16	**GTX**	**728**	**(Germany) HRT Performance**	**(China) Kerong Li (United States) Jean-Francois Brunot**	**Porsche 4.0L MA1.76/MDG.G flat six**	**+22 laps**	**308**	**136.69**
17	**991**	**973**	**(Italy) EBIMOTORS**	**(Italy) Paolo Venerosi (Italy) Gianluca Giorgi (Italy) Gianluigi Piccioli (Italy) Spezz**	**Porsche 911 GT3 (991.2)**	**+24 laps**	**306**	**135.13**
17	**991**	**973**	**(Italy) EBIMOTORS**	**(Italy) Paolo Venerosi (Italy) Gianluca Giorgi (Italy) Gianluigi Piccioli (Italy) Spezz**	**Porsche 4.0L MA1.76/MDG.G flat six**	**+24 laps**	**306**	**135.13**
18	GTX	720	(Lithuania) RD Signs - Siauliai racing team	(Lithuania) Audrius Butkevicius (Italy) Nicola Michelon (Lithuania) Paulius Paskevicius	Lamborghini Huracán Super Trofeo	+24 Laps	306	132.55
18	GTX	720	(Lithuania) RD Signs - Siauliai racing team	(Lithuania) Audrius Butkevicius (Italy) Nicola Michelon (Lithuania) Paulius Paskevicius	Lamborghini 5.2L FSI V10	+24 Laps	306	132.55
19	**TCR**	**159**	**(Thailand) BBR**	**(Thailand) Chariya Nuya (Thailand) Kantadhee Kusiri (Thailand) Kantasak Kusiri (Thailand) Tanart Sathienthirakul**	**Cupra Leon Competición TCR**	**+26 laps**	**304**	**134.30**
19	**TCR**	**159**	**(Thailand) BBR**	**(Thailand) Chariya Nuya (Thailand) Kantadhee Kusiri (Thailand) Kantasak Kusiri (Thailand) Tanart Sathienthirakul**	**Volkswagen 2.0L EA888 Evo 4 TSI inline four**	**+26 laps**	**304**	**134.30**
20	TCR	104	(Lithuania) NOKER Racing Team	(Lithuania) Kestutis Stasionis (Estonia) Sten-Dorian Piirimägi (Lithuania) Jonas Karklys (Estonia) Antti Rammo	Volkswagen Golf GTi TCR SEQ	+29 laps	301	134.92
20	TCR	104	(Lithuania) NOKER Racing Team	(Lithuania) Kestutis Stasionis (Estonia) Sten-Dorian Piirimägi (Lithuania) Jonas Karklys (Estonia) Antti Rammo	Volkswagen 2.0L EA888 Evo 4 TSI inline four	+29 laps	301	134.92
21	TCR	116	(Switzerland) Wolf-Power Racing	(Switzerland) Jasmin Preisig (Germany) Marcus Menden (Latvia) Ivas Vallers	Audi RS 3 LMS TCR	+33 laps	297	129.85
21	TCR	116	(Switzerland) Wolf-Power Racing	(Switzerland) Jasmin Preisig (Germany) Marcus Menden (Latvia) Ivas Vallers	Volkswagen 2.0L EA888 Evo 4 TSI inline four	+33 laps	297	129.85
22	**GT4**	**421**	**(Belgium) Team ACP-Tangerine Associates by VEIDEC JJ Motosport**	**(United States) Catesby Jones (Belgium) Wim Spinoy**	**BMW M4 GT4**	**+36 laps**	**294**	**131.02**
22	**GT4**	**421**	**(Belgium) Team ACP-Tangerine Associates by VEIDEC JJ Motosport**	**(United States) Catesby Jones (Belgium) Wim Spinoy**	**BMW 3.0L S58B30T0 inline six**	**+36 laps**	**294**	
23	GT3-Am	6	(Netherlands) BoDa by Bas Koten Racing	(Netherlands) Bob Herber (Netherlands) Marcel van Berlo	Bentley Continental GT3	+38 laps	292	140.53
23	GT3-Am	6	(Netherlands) BoDa by Bas Koten Racing	(Netherlands) Bob Herber (Netherlands) Marcel van Berlo	Bentley 4.0L TFSI V8	+38 laps	292	
24	992-Am	912	(France) Porsche Lorient Racing	(France) Philippe Polette (France) Frederic Lelievre (France) Jean-François Demorge (France) Gilles Blasco	Porsche 911 GT3 (992)	+39 laps	291	132.13
24	992-Am	912	(France) Porsche Lorient Racing	(France) Philippe Polette (France) Frederic Lelievre (France) Jean-François Demorge (France) Gilles Blasco	Porsche 4.0L MA1.76/MDG.G flat six	+39 laps	291	132.13
25	GT3-Pro/Am	72	(Lithuania) Juta Racing Junior	(Lithuania) Audrius Navickas (Lithuania) Aurimas Jablonskis (Lithuania) Ignas Gelžinis	Audi R8 LMS Evo I	+42 laps	288	132.94
25	GT3-Pro/Am	72	(Lithuania) Juta Racing Junior	(Lithuania) Audrius Navickas (Lithuania) Aurimas Jablonskis (Lithuania) Ignas Gelžinis	Audi 5.2L FSI V10	+42 laps	288	132.94
26	TCR	102	(Denmark) Holmgaard Motorsport	(Denmark) Magnus Holmgaard (Denmark) Jonas Holmgaard (Norway) Roy Edland (Denmark) Martin Vedel Mortensen	Volkswagen Golf GTi TCR DSG	+48 laps	282	117.15
26	TCR	102	(Denmark) Holmgaard Motorsport	(Denmark) Magnus Holmgaard (Denmark) Jonas Holmgaard (Norway) Roy Edland (Denmark) Martin Vedel Mortensen	Volkswagen 2.0L EA888 Evo 4 TSI inline four	+48 laps	282	117.15
27	GTX	703	(France) Vortex V8	(France) Pierre Fontaine (France) Christophe Decultot (France) Philippe Gruau	Vortex 1.0 GTX	+54 Laps	276	122.38
27	GTX	703	(France) Vortex V8	(France) Pierre Fontaine (France) Christophe Decultot (France) Philippe Gruau	Chevrolet 6.2L LS3 V8	+54 Laps	276	122.38
28	**TCX**	**215**	**(France) SK Racing**	**(France) Franck Eburderie (France) Franco Lemma (France) Jérôme Dacosta (France) Franck Lavergne**	**Ligier JS2 R**	**+57 laps**	**273**	**114.16**
28	**TCX**	**215**	**(France) SK Racing**	**(France) Franck Eburderie (France) Franco Lemma (France) Jérôme Dacosta (France) Franck Lavergne**	**Ford 3.7L Duratec 37 V6**	**+57 laps**	**273**	**114.16**
29	991	974	(Italy) EBIMOTORS	(Italy) Luigi Peroni (Italy) Pietro Negra (Italy) Massimiliano Donzelli (Italy) Massimiliano Montagnese	Porsche 911 GT3 (991.2)	+58 laps	272	107.32
29	991	974	(Italy) EBIMOTORS	(Italy) Luigi Peroni (Italy) Pietro Negra (Italy) Massimiliano Donzelli (Italy) Massimiliano Montagnese	Porsche 4.0L MA1.76/MDG.G flat six	+58 laps	272	107.32
30	**TC**	**332**	**(Switzerland) Hofor Racing by Bonk Motorsport**	**(Germany) Michael Mayer (Germany) Volker Piepmeyer (Germany) Jürgen Meyer (Germany) Michael Bonk**	**BMW M2 CS Racing**	**+60 laps**	**270**	**119.66**
30	**TC**	**332**	**(Switzerland) Hofor Racing by Bonk Motorsport**	**(Germany) Michael Mayer (Germany) Volker Piepmeyer (Germany) Jürgen Meyer (Germany) Michael Bonk**	**BMW 3.0L S55B30T0 inline six**	**+60 laps**	**270**	**119.66**
31	GT4	417	(Switzerland) Orchid Racing Team	(Switzerland) Alexandre Mottet (France) Stefan Chaligne (France) Antoine Leclerc (Spain) Antonio Garzon	Porsche 718 Cayman GT4 Clubsport Manthey-Racing	+72 laps	258	100.35
31	GT4	417	(Switzerland) Orchid Racing Team	(Switzerland) Alexandre Mottet (France) Stefan Chaligne (France) Antoine Leclerc (Spain) Antonio Garzon	Porsche 3.8L MA1.24/MDG.G flat six	+72 laps	258	100.35
DNF	TCX	205	(United Kingdom) Valluga	(United Kingdom) Bradley Ellis (Cyprus) Leo Loucas (Cyprus) Rhea Loucas (United Kingdom) Charles Hollings	Porsche 718 Cayman GT4 Clubsport	Collision	249	131.99
DNF	TCX	205	(United Kingdom) Valluga	(United Kingdom) Bradley Ellis (Cyprus) Leo Loucas (Cyprus) Rhea Loucas (United Kingdom) Charles Hollings	Porsche 3.8L MA1.24/MDG.G flat six	Collision	249	131.99
33	TC	331	(Switzerland) Hofor Racing by Bonk Motorsport	(Germany) Rainer Partl (Germany) Hermann Bonk (Switzerland) Martin Kroll (Germany) Michael Bonk	BMW M2 CS Racing	+94 laps	236	119.65
33	TC	331	(Switzerland) Hofor Racing by Bonk Motorsport	(Germany) Rainer Partl (Germany) Hermann Bonk (Switzerland) Martin Kroll (Germany) Michael Bonk	BMW 3.0L S55B30T0 inline six	+94 laps	236	119.65
34	GTX	702	(France) Vortex V8	(France) Patrick Brochier (France) Gilles Courtois (Switzerland) Nicolas Nobs	Vortex 1.0 GTX	+99 laps	231	121.79
34	GTX	702	(France) Vortex V8	(France) Patrick Brochier (France) Gilles Courtois (Switzerland) Nicolas Nobs	Chevrolet 6.2L LS3 V8	+99 laps	231	121.79
DNF	GT3-Am	26	(France) Saintéloc Racing	(France) Olivier Esteves (Belgium) Pierre-Yves Paque (Belgium) Christian Kelders (France) Simon Gachet	Audi R8 LMS Evo II	Collision	229	149.50
DNF	GT3-Am	26	(France) Saintéloc Racing	(France) Olivier Esteves (Belgium) Pierre-Yves Paque (Belgium) Christian Kelders (France) Simon Gachet	Audi 5.2L FSI V10	Collision	229	149.50
DNF	GT3	61	(New Zealand) Earl Bamber Motorsport	(Malaysia) Adrian D'Silva (New Zealand) Matthew Payne (New Zealand) Reid Harker	Porsche 911 GT3 (991.2)	Collision	227	146.11
DNF	GT3	61	(New Zealand) Earl Bamber Motorsport	(Malaysia) Adrian D'Silva (New Zealand) Matthew Payne (New Zealand) Reid Harker	Porsche 4.0L MA1.76/MDG.G flat six	Collision	227	146.11
DNF	GT3	91	(Germany) Herberth Motorsport	(Switzerland) Daniel Allemann (Germany) Ralf Bohn (Germany) Alfred Renauer (Germany) Robert Renauer	Porsche 911 GT3 (991.2)	Retired	227	113.67
DNF	GT3	91	(Germany) Herberth Motorsport	(Switzerland) Daniel Allemann (Germany) Ralf Bohn (Germany) Alfred Renauer (Germany) Robert Renauer	Porsche 4.0L MA1.76/MDG.G flat six	Retired	227	113.67
DNF	GTX	701	(France) Vortex V8	(France) Lionel Amrouche (France) Philippe Bonnel (France) Sebastien Lajoux	Vortex 1.0 GTX	Power loss	173	70.72
DNF	GTX	701	(France) Vortex V8	(France) Lionel Amrouche (France) Philippe Bonnel (France) Sebastien Lajoux	Chevrolet 6.2L LS3 V8	Power loss	173	70.72
DNF	GT3-Am	2	(Netherlands) JR Motorsport	(Netherlands) Ted van Vliet (Netherlands) Ruud Olij	BMW M6 GT3	Gearbox	169	140.22
DNF	GT3-Am	2	(Netherlands) JR Motorsport	(Netherlands) Ted van Vliet (Netherlands) Ruud Olij	BMW 4.4L S63B44T0 V8	Gearbox	169	140.22
DNS	991	955	(Romania) Willi Motorsport by Ebimotors	(Italy) Fabrizio Broggi (Italy) Sabino de Castro (Romania) Sergiu Nicolae	Porsche 911 GT3 (991.2)	Accident	81	-
DNS	991	955	(Romania) Willi Motorsport by Ebimotors	(Italy) Fabrizio Broggi (Italy) Sabino de Castro (Romania) Sergiu Nicolae	Porsche 4.0L MA1.76/MDG.G flat-six	Accident	81	-

== Footnotes ==
24H GT Series
Previous race: Dubai 24 Hour	2022 season	Next race: 12 Hours of Spa-Francorchamps

24H TCE Series
Previous race: Dubai 24 Hour	2022 season	Next race: 12 Hours of Spa-Francorchamps
