= 2022 24H TCE Series =

Touring Car Endurance Series

The 2022 24H Touring Car Endurance Series powered by Hankook is the seventh season of the Touring Car Endurance Series (TCES). Creventic is the organiser and promoter of the series. The races are contested with TCR Touring Cars, TCX cars and TC cars.

== Calendar ==
Race is part of the Middle East Trophy Series

Round	Event	Circuit	Date
1	Dubai 24 Hour	Dubai Autodrome, Dubai Motor City, United Arab Emirates	13–15 January
NC	6 Hours of Abu Dhabi†	Yas Marina Circuit, Yas Island, United Arab Emirates	21–22 January
2	12 Hours of Mugello	Mugello Circuit, Scarperia e San Piero, Italy	25–27 March
3	12 Hours of Spa-Francorchamps	Circuit de Spa-Francorchamps, Stavelot, Belgium	22–24 April
4	12 Hours of Hockenheimring	Hockenheimring, Hockenheim, Germany	13–15 May
5	24 Hours of Portimão	Algarve International Circuit, Portimão, Portugal	8–10 July
6	24 Hours of Barcelona	Circuit de Barcelona-Catalunya, Montmeló, Spain	9–11 September
7	12 Hours of Kuwait	Kuwait Motor Town, Ali Sabah Al Salem, Kuwait	30 November–2 December

† – Non-championship round. The following events where scheduled to take place but were cancelled.

Event	Circuit	Date
24 Hours of Sebring	Sebring International Raceway, Highlands County, Florida, United States	18–20 November

== Teams and drivers ==
Team	Car	Engine	No.	Drivers	Rounds
TCR
(Denmark) Holmgaard Motorsport	Volkswagen Golf GTI TCR	Volkswagen EA888 2.0 L I4	102	(Denmark) Jonas Holmgaard	1–3
(Denmark) Holmgaard Motorsport	Volkswagen Golf GTI TCR	Volkswagen EA888 2.0 L I4	102	(Denmark) Magnus Holmgaard	1–3
(Denmark) Holmgaard Motorsport	Volkswagen Golf GTI TCR	Volkswagen EA888 2.0 L I4	102	(United Kingdom) Sam Neary	1
(Denmark) Holmgaard Motorsport	Volkswagen Golf GTI TCR	Volkswagen EA888 2.0 L I4	102	(Denmark) Thomas Sørensen	1
(Denmark) Holmgaard Motorsport	Volkswagen Golf GTI TCR	Volkswagen EA888 2.0 L I4	102	(United Kingdom) Andie Stokoe	1
(Denmark) Holmgaard Motorsport	Volkswagen Golf GTI TCR	Volkswagen EA888 2.0 L I4	102	(Norway) Roy Edland	2–3
(Denmark) Holmgaard Motorsport	Volkswagen Golf GTI TCR	Volkswagen EA888 2.0 L I4	102	(Denmark) Martin Vedel Mortensen	2–3
(Denmark) Holmgaard Motorsport	CUPRA León Competición TCR	Volkswagen EA888 2.0 L I4	102	(Denmark) Jonas Holmgaard	4, 6
(Denmark) Holmgaard Motorsport	CUPRA León Competición TCR	Volkswagen EA888 2.0 L I4	102	(Denmark) Magnus Holmgaard	4, 6
(Denmark) Holmgaard Motorsport	CUPRA León Competición TCR	Volkswagen EA888 2.0 L I4	102	(Norway) Roy Edland	4, 6
(Denmark) Holmgaard Motorsport	CUPRA León Competición TCR	Volkswagen EA888 2.0 L I4	102	(Denmark) Martin Vedel Mortensen	4, 6
(Germany) Passion Performance Motorsports	CUPRA León TCR	Volkswagen EA888 2.0 L I4	103	(United Arab Emirates) Mohammed Al Owais	1
(Germany) Passion Performance Motorsports	CUPRA León TCR	Volkswagen EA888 2.0 L I4	103	(Germany) Christian Ladurner	1
(Germany) Passion Performance Motorsports	CUPRA León TCR	Volkswagen EA888 2.0 L I4	103	(Germany) Marco Santamaria	1
(Germany) Passion Performance Motorsports	CUPRA León TCR	Volkswagen EA888 2.0 L I4	103	(Jordan) Nadir Zuhour	1
(Lithuania) NOKER Racing Team	Volkswagen Golf GTI TCR	Volkswagen EA888 2.0 L I4	104	(Estonia) Sten-Dorian Piirimägi	2–3
(Lithuania) NOKER Racing Team	Volkswagen Golf GTI TCR	Volkswagen EA888 2.0 L I4	104	(Lithuania) Kestutis Stasionis	2–3
(Lithuania) NOKER Racing Team	Volkswagen Golf GTI TCR	Volkswagen EA888 2.0 L I4	104	(Lithuania) Jonas Karklys	2
(Lithuania) NOKER Racing Team	Volkswagen Golf GTI TCR	Volkswagen EA888 2.0 L I4	104	(Estonia) Antti Rammo	2
(Lithuania) NOKER Racing Team	Volkswagen Golf GTI TCR	Volkswagen EA888 2.0 L I4	104	(Lithuania) Arunas Geciauskas	3
(Lithuania) GSR Motorsport	Volkswagen Golf GTI TCR	Volkswagen EA888 2.0 L I4	105	(Lithuania) Ernesta Globytė	3–4, 6
(Lithuania) GSR Motorsport	Volkswagen Golf GTI TCR	Volkswagen EA888 2.0 L I4	105	(Lithuania) Mindaugas Liatukas	3–4, 6
(Lithuania) GSR Motorsport	Volkswagen Golf GTI TCR	Volkswagen EA888 2.0 L I4	105	(Lithuania) Egidijus Gelūnas	3
(Lithuania) GSR Motorsport	Volkswagen Golf GTI TCR	Volkswagen EA888 2.0 L I4	105	(Lithuania) Rolandas Salys	3
(Lithuania) GSR Motorsport	Volkswagen Golf GTI TCR	Volkswagen EA888 2.0 L I4	105	(Lithuania) Rokas Kvedaras	4, 6
(Sweden) Lestrup Racing Team	Volkswagen Golf GTI TCR	Volkswagen EA888 2.0 L I4	110	(Sweden) Mats Olsson	4–5
(Sweden) Lestrup Racing Team	Volkswagen Golf GTI TCR	Volkswagen EA888 2.0 L I4	110	(Sweden) Peter Fahlström	4–5
(Sweden) Lestrup Racing Team	Volkswagen Golf GTI TCR	Volkswagen EA888 2.0 L I4	110	(Sweden) Stefan Nilsson	4–5
(Sweden) Lestrup Racing Team	Volkswagen Golf GTI TCR	Volkswagen EA888 2.0 L I4	110	(Sweden) Christian Axelsson	4
(Sweden) Lestrup Racing Team	Audi RS 3 LMS TCR (2021)	Volkswagen EA888 2.0 L I4	120	(Sweden) Emil Sällberg	4
(Sweden) Lestrup Racing Team	Audi RS 3 LMS TCR (2021)	Volkswagen EA888 2.0 L I4	120	(Sweden) Marcus Fluch	4
(Sweden) Lestrup Racing Team	Audi RS 3 LMS TCR (2021)	Volkswagen EA888 2.0 L I4	120	(Sweden) Oliver Söderström	4
(Sweden) Lestrup Racing Team	Audi RS 3 LMS TCR (2021)	Volkswagen EA888 2.0 L I4	120	(Sweden) Andreas Bäckman	4
(Switzerland) Autorama Motorsport by Wolf-Power Racing	Volkswagen Golf GTI TCR	Volkswagen EA888 2.0 L I4	111	(Switzerland) Fabian Danz	1
(Switzerland) Autorama Motorsport by Wolf-Power Racing	Volkswagen Golf GTI TCR	Volkswagen EA888 2.0 L I4	111	(Austria) Constantin Kletzer	1
(Switzerland) Autorama Motorsport by Wolf-Power Racing	Volkswagen Golf GTI TCR	Volkswagen EA888 2.0 L I4	111	(Switzerland) Jasmin Preisig	1
(Switzerland) Autorama Motorsport by Wolf-Power Racing	Volkswagen Golf GTI TCR	Volkswagen EA888 2.0 L I4	111	(Netherlands) Paul Sieljes	1
(Switzerland) Autorama Motorsport by Wolf-Power Racing	Volkswagen Golf GTI TCR	Volkswagen EA888 2.0 L I4	112	(Lithuania) Vytenis Gulbinas	1
(Switzerland) Autorama Motorsport by Wolf-Power Racing	Volkswagen Golf GTI TCR	Volkswagen EA888 2.0 L I4	112	(Germany) Henry Littig	1
(Switzerland) Autorama Motorsport by Wolf-Power Racing	Volkswagen Golf GTI TCR	Volkswagen EA888 2.0 L I4	112	(United Kingdom) Alex Morgan	1
(Switzerland) Autorama Motorsport by Wolf-Power Racing	Volkswagen Golf GTI TCR	Volkswagen EA888 2.0 L I4	112	(Brazil) Gustavo Xavier	1
(Switzerland) Autorama Motorsport by Wolf-Power Racing	Volkswagen Golf GTI TCR	Volkswagen EA888 2.0 L I4	112	(Estonia) Antti Rammo	1
(Switzerland) Autorama Motorsport by Wolf-Power Racing	Audi RS 3 LMS TCR (2021)	Volkswagen EA888 2.0 L I4	116	(Germany) Marcus Menden	1–3
(Switzerland) Autorama Motorsport by Wolf-Power Racing	Audi RS 3 LMS TCR (2021)	Volkswagen EA888 2.0 L I4	116	(United Kingdom) Robert Huff	1, 6
(Switzerland) Autorama Motorsport by Wolf-Power Racing	Audi RS 3 LMS TCR (2021)	Volkswagen EA888 2.0 L I4	116	(Germany) Marlon Menden	1, 4
(Switzerland) Autorama Motorsport by Wolf-Power Racing	Audi RS 3 LMS TCR (2021)	Volkswagen EA888 2.0 L I4	116	(United Kingdom) Alex Morgan	1
(Switzerland) Autorama Motorsport by Wolf-Power Racing	Audi RS 3 LMS TCR (2021)	Volkswagen EA888 2.0 L I4	116	(Germany) Peter Posavac	1
(Switzerland) Autorama Motorsport by Wolf-Power Racing	Audi RS 3 LMS TCR (2021)	Volkswagen EA888 2.0 L I4	116	(Switzerland) Jasmin Preisig	2–6
(Switzerland) Autorama Motorsport by Wolf-Power Racing	Audi RS 3 LMS TCR (2021)	Volkswagen EA888 2.0 L I4	116	(Latvia) Ivars Vallers	2, 4–6
(Switzerland) Autorama Motorsport by Wolf-Power Racing	Audi RS 3 LMS TCR (2021)	Volkswagen EA888 2.0 L I4	116	(Switzerland) Fabian Danz	3
(Spain) PCR Sport	CUPRA León Competición TCR	Volkswagen EA888 2.0 L I4	117	(Spain) Vicente Dasi	3
(Spain) PCR Sport	CUPRA León Competición TCR	Volkswagen EA888 2.0 L I4	117	(Spain) Josep Parera	3
(Spain) PCR Sport	CUPRA León Competición TCR	Volkswagen EA888 2.0 L I4	117	(Latvia) Ivars Vallers	3
(Spain) Rail Equip by Totcar Sport	CUPRA León TCR	Volkswagen 2.0 L I4	123	(Spain) Jorge Belloc Diaz	3, 6
(Spain) Rail Equip by Totcar Sport	CUPRA León TCR	Volkswagen 2.0 L I4	123	(Spain) Jorge Belloc Ruiz	3, 6
(Spain) Rail Equip by Totcar Sport	CUPRA León TCR	Volkswagen 2.0 L I4	123	(Spain) Álvaro Rodríguez Sastre	3, 6
(Austria) Wimmer Werk Motorsport	CUPRA León TCR	Volkswagen 2.0 L I4	124	(Austria) Peter Gross	4
(Austria) Wimmer Werk Motorsport	CUPRA León TCR	Volkswagen 2.0 L I4	124	(Austria) Dominik Haselsteiner	4
(Austria) Wimmer Werk Motorsport	CUPRA León TCR	Volkswagen 2.0 L I4	124	(Austria) Günther Wiesmeier	4
(Austria) Wimmer Werk Motorsport	CUPRA León TCR	Volkswagen 2.0 L I4	124	(Austria) Daniel Lemmerhofer	4
(Hungary) Zengő Motorsport	CUPRA León TCR	Volkswagen EA888 2.0 L I4	133	(Hungary) Tamás Horváth	1
(Hungary) Zengő Motorsport	CUPRA León TCR	Volkswagen EA888 2.0 L I4	133	(Hungary) Gábor Kismarty-Lechner	1
(Hungary) Zengő Motorsport	CUPRA León TCR	Volkswagen EA888 2.0 L I4	133	(Hungary) Ga'l Szabolcs	1
(Hungary) Zengő Motorsport	CUPRA León TCR	Volkswagen EA888 2.0 L I4	133	(Hungary) Csaba Tóth	1
(Hungary) Zengő Motorsport	CUPRA León TCR	Volkswagen EA888 2.0 L I4	133	(Hungary) Zoltan Zengö	1
(Spain) Baporo Motorsport	CUPRA León TCR	Volkswagen 2.0 L I4	151	(Spain) Jaume Font	3
(Spain) Baporo Motorsport	CUPRA León TCR	Volkswagen 2.0 L I4	151	(Andorra) Joan Vinyes	3
(Thailand) BBR – Billionaire Boys Racing	CUPRA León TCR 1 CUPRA León Competición TCR 2–3	Volkswagen EA888 2.0 L I4	159	(Thailand) Kantadhee Kusiri	1–6
(Thailand) BBR – Billionaire Boys Racing	CUPRA León TCR 1 CUPRA León Competición TCR 2–3	Volkswagen EA888 2.0 L I4	159	(Thailand) Kantasak Kusiri	1–6
(Thailand) BBR – Billionaire Boys Racing	CUPRA León TCR 1 CUPRA León Competición TCR 2–3	Volkswagen EA888 2.0 L I4	159	(Thailand) Tanart Sathienthirakul	1–2, 5
(Thailand) BBR – Billionaire Boys Racing	CUPRA León TCR 1 CUPRA León Competición TCR 2–3	Volkswagen EA888 2.0 L I4	159	(Thailand) Anusorn Asiralertsiri	1, 5–6
(Thailand) BBR – Billionaire Boys Racing	CUPRA León TCR 1 CUPRA León Competición TCR 2–3	Volkswagen EA888 2.0 L I4	159	(Thailand) Pasarit Promsombat	1, 5
(Thailand) BBR – Billionaire Boys Racing	CUPRA León TCR 1 CUPRA León Competición TCR 2–3	Volkswagen EA888 2.0 L I4	159	(Thailand) Chariya Nuya	2–4
(Thailand) BBR – Billionaire Boys Racing	CUPRA León TCR 1 CUPRA León Competición TCR 2–3	Volkswagen EA888 2.0 L I4	159	(Thailand) Munkong Sathienthirakul	3–4
(Belgium) AC Motorsport	Audi RS 3 LMS TCR (2017)	Volkswagen EA888 2.0 L I4	188	(Belgium) Mathieu Detry	1, 3, 6
(Belgium) AC Motorsport	Audi RS 3 LMS TCR (2017)	Volkswagen EA888 2.0 L I4	188	(Switzerland) Yannick Mettler	1, 3
(Belgium) AC Motorsport	Audi RS 3 LMS TCR (2017)	Volkswagen EA888 2.0 L I4	188	(France) Stéphane Perrin	1, 3, 6
(Belgium) AC Motorsport	Audi RS 3 LMS TCR (2017)	Volkswagen EA888 2.0 L I4	188	(Switzerland) Miklas Born	1
TCX
(Germany) Schubert Motorsport	BMW M2 ClubSport Racing	BMW S55B30T0 3.0 L I6	200	(Germany) Torsten Schubert	1
(Germany) Schubert Motorsport	BMW M2 ClubSport Racing	BMW S55B30T0 3.0 L I6	200	(Germany) Michael von Zabiensky	1
(Germany) Schubert Motorsport	BMW M2 ClubSport Racing	BMW S55B30T0 3.0 L I6	200	(Germany) Stefan von Zabiensky	1
(France) Les Deux Arbres	Ligier JS2 R	Ford Cyclone 3.7 L V6	202	(France) Christophe Bouchut	1
(France) Les Deux Arbres	Ligier JS2 R	Ford Cyclone 3.7 L V6	202	(France) Jack Leconte	1
(France) Les Deux Arbres	Ligier JS2 R	Ford Cyclone 3.7 L V6	202	(France) Antoine Lepesqueux	1
(France) Les Deux Arbres	Ligier JS2 R	Ford Cyclone 3.7 L V6	202	(Switzerland) Patrick Zacchia	1
(France) Les Deux Arbres	Ligier JS2 R	Ford Cyclone 3.7 L V6	202	(Switzerland) Steve Zacchia	1
(United Kingdom) Valluga Racing	Porsche 718 Cayman GT4 Clubsport	Porsche 3.8 L Flat-6	205	(United Kingdom) Bradley Ellis	2–4
(United Kingdom) Valluga Racing	Porsche 718 Cayman GT4 Clubsport	Porsche 3.8 L Flat-6	205	(Cyprus) Leo Loucas	2–4
(United Kingdom) Valluga Racing	Porsche 718 Cayman GT4 Clubsport	Porsche 3.8 L Flat-6	205	(Cyprus) Rhea Loucas	2–4
(United Kingdom) Valluga Racing	Porsche 718 Cayman GT4 Clubsport	Porsche 3.8 L Flat-6	205	(United Kingdom) Charlie Hollings	2–3
(France) Orhes Racing	Ligier JS2 R	Ford Cyclone 3.7 L V6	207	(France) Micael Costa	1
(France) Orhes Racing	Ligier JS2 R	Ford Cyclone 3.7 L V6	207	(France) Franck Dallavalle	1
(France) Orhes Racing	Ligier JS2 R	Ford Cyclone 3.7 L V6	207	(France) José Fernandes	1
(France) Orhes Racing	Ligier JS2 R	Ford Cyclone 3.7 L V6	207	(France) Benjamin Riviere	1
(France) Orhes Racing	Ligier JS2 R	Ford Cyclone 3.7 L V6	207	(France) Rocco Spano	1
(Germany) Yeeti Racing	BMW M2 ClubSport Racing	BMW S55B30T0 3.0 L I6	208	(Germany) Phil Hill	1
(Germany) Yeeti Racing	BMW M2 ClubSport Racing	BMW S55B30T0 3.0 L I6	208	(Denmark) Thomas Krebs	1
(Germany) Yeeti Racing	BMW M2 ClubSport Racing	BMW S55B30T0 3.0 L I6	208	(Italy) Domenico Solombrino	1
(Germany) Yeeti Racing	BMW M2 ClubSport Racing	BMW S55B30T0 3.0 L I6	208	(United States) Hanna Zellers	1
(France) SK Racing	Ligier JS2 R	Ford Cyclone 3.7 L V6	215	(France) Jérôme Dacosta	2, 6
(France) SK Racing	Ligier JS2 R	Ford Cyclone 3.7 L V6	215	(France) Franck Eburderie	2, 6
(France) SK Racing	Ligier JS2 R	Ford Cyclone 3.7 L V6	215	(France) Franck Lavergne	2, 6
(France) SK Racing	Ligier JS2 R	Ford Cyclone 3.7 L V6	215	(France) Franco Lemma	2, 6
(Denmark) Sally Racing	Cupra León TCR	Volkswagen EA888 2.0 L I4	219	(Denmark) Morten Eriksen	1
(Denmark) Sally Racing	Cupra León TCR	Volkswagen EA888 2.0 L I4	219	(Denmark) Niels Ulrich Nyboe	1
(Denmark) Sally Racing	Cupra León TCR	Volkswagen EA888 2.0 L I4	219	(Denmark) Peter Obel	1
(Denmark) Sally Racing	Cupra León TCR	Volkswagen EA888 2.0 L I4	219	(Denmark) Henrik Thomsen	1
(Belgium) Xwift Racing	Ligier JS2 R	Ford Cyclone 3.7 L V6	221	(Belgium) Tim de Borle	3–4
(Belgium) Xwift Racing	Ligier JS2 R	Ford Cyclone 3.7 L V6	221	(Belgium) Pieter Denys	3–4
(Belgium) Xwift Racing	Ligier JS2 R	Ford Cyclone 3.7 L V6	221	(Belgium) Steven Dewulf	3–4
(France) (Luxembourg) / Lamera GT (Note: Car No. 222 entered as Lamera GT and No. 223 entered as Lamera GT LUX.); (France) (Luxembourg) / Lamera GT LUX	Lamera GT	Volvo 2.5 L I5	222	(France) Pierre Couasnon	1
(France) (Luxembourg) / Lamera GT; (France) (Luxembourg) / Lamera GT LUX	Lamera GT	Volvo 2.5 L I5	222	(France) Franck Dezoteux	1
(France) (Luxembourg) / Lamera GT; (France) (Luxembourg) / Lamera GT LUX	Lamera GT	Volvo 2.5 L I5	222	(France) Grégory Fargier	1
(France) (Luxembourg) / Lamera GT; (France) (Luxembourg) / Lamera GT LUX	Lamera GT	Volvo 2.5 L I5	222	(France) Wilfried Merafina	1
(France) (Luxembourg) / Lamera GT; (France) (Luxembourg) / Lamera GT LUX	Lamera GT	Volvo 2.5 L I5	223	(France) Sébastien Guignard	1
(France) (Luxembourg) / Lamera GT; (France) (Luxembourg) / Lamera GT LUX	Lamera GT	Volvo 2.5 L I5	223	(France) Mattéo Mérafina	1
(France) (Luxembourg) / Lamera GT; (France) (Luxembourg) / Lamera GT LUX	Lamera GT	Volvo 2.5 L I5	223	(France) Thomas Mérafina	1
(France) (Luxembourg) / Lamera GT; (France) (Luxembourg) / Lamera GT LUX	Lamera GT	Volvo 2.5 L I5	223	(Luxembourg) Tommy Rollinger	1
(France) PR-V	Porsche 718 Cayman GT4 Clubsport	Porsche 3.8 L Flat-6	225	(Germany) Christian Gloz	3
(France) PR-V	Porsche 718 Cayman GT4 Clubsport	Porsche 3.8 L Flat-6	225	(France) Hervé Houdré	3
(France) COGEMO/TLRT	BMW M2 ClubSport Racing	BMW S55B30T0 3.0 L I6	255	(France) André Grammatico	1, 3
(France) COGEMO/TLRT	BMW M2 ClubSport Racing	BMW S55B30T0 3.0 L I6	255	(France) Sebastien Morales	1, 3
(France) COGEMO/TLRT	BMW M2 ClubSport Racing	BMW S55B30T0 3.0 L I6	255	(France) Antoine Lacoste	1
(France) COGEMO/TLRT	BMW M2 ClubSport Racing	BMW S55B30T0 3.0 L I6	255	(France) Philippe Thirion	1
(France) COGEMO/TLRT	BMW M2 ClubSport Racing	BMW S55B30T0 3.0 L I6	255	(Belgium) Benjamin Lessennes	3
(United Kingdom) CWS Engineering	Ginetta G55 Supercup	Ford Cyclone 3.7 L V6	278	(France) Alain Bucher	1
(United Kingdom) CWS Engineering	Ginetta G55 Supercup	Ford Cyclone 3.7 L V6	278	(United Kingdom) Finlay Hutchison	1
(United Kingdom) CWS Engineering	Ginetta G55 Supercup	Ford Cyclone 3.7 L V6	278	(United States) Matthew Ibrahim	1
(United Kingdom) CWS Engineering	Ginetta G55 Supercup	Ford Cyclone 3.7 L V6	278	(United Kingdom) Darren Leung	1
(United Kingdom) CWS Engineering	Ginetta G55 Supercup	Ford Cyclone 3.7 L V6	278	(United Kingdom) Bobby Thompson	1
(United Kingdom) APO Sport	Ginetta G55 Supercup	Ford Cyclone 3.7 L V6	280	(United Kingdom) James May	3
(United Kingdom) APO Sport	Ginetta G55 Supercup	Ford Cyclone 3.7 L V6	280	(United Kingdom) Paul May	3
(United Kingdom) APO Sport	Ginetta G55 Supercup	Ford Cyclone 3.7 L V6	280	(United Kingdom) Alex Osborne	3
(France) CTF Performance	Ligier JS2 R	Ford Cyclone 3.7 L V6	295	(France) Nicolas Beraud	1
(France) CTF Performance	Ligier JS2 R	Ford Cyclone 3.7 L V6	295	(France) Fabien Delaplace	1
(France) CTF Performance	Ligier JS2 R	Ford Cyclone 3.7 L V6	295	(France) Laurent Pigeut	1
(France) CTF Performance	Ligier JS2 R	Ford Cyclone 3.7 L V6	295	(France) Gilles Poret	1
(France) CTF Performance	Ligier JS2 R	Ford Cyclone 3.7 L V6	296	(France) Nicolas Beraud	1
(France) CTF Performance	Ligier JS2 R	Ford Cyclone 3.7 L V6	296	(France) Fabien Delaplace	1
(France) CTF Performance	Ligier JS2 R	Ford Cyclone 3.7 L V6	296	(France) Laurent Pigeut	1
(France) CTF Performance	Ligier JS2 R	Ford Cyclone 3.7 L V6	296	(France) Gilles Poret	1
TC
(Switzerland) Hofor Racing by Bonk Motorsport	BMW M2 ClubSport Racing	BMW S55B30T0 3.0 L I6	331	(Germany) Hermann Bock	2, 6
(Switzerland) Hofor Racing by Bonk Motorsport	BMW M2 ClubSport Racing	BMW S55B30T0 3.0 L I6	331	(Germany) Michael Bonk	2, 6
(Switzerland) Hofor Racing by Bonk Motorsport	BMW M2 ClubSport Racing	BMW S55B30T0 3.0 L I6	331	(Switzerland) Martin Kroll	2, 6
(Switzerland) Hofor Racing by Bonk Motorsport	BMW M2 ClubSport Racing	BMW S55B30T0 3.0 L I6	331	(Germany) Rainer Partl	2
(Switzerland) Hofor Racing by Bonk Motorsport	BMW M2 ClubSport Racing	BMW S55B30T0 3.0 L I6	332	(Germany) Michael Mayer	2, 6
(Switzerland) Hofor Racing by Bonk Motorsport	BMW M2 ClubSport Racing	BMW S55B30T0 3.0 L I6	332	(Germany) Jürgen Meyer	2
(Switzerland) Hofor Racing by Bonk Motorsport	BMW M2 ClubSport Racing	BMW S55B30T0 3.0 L I6	332	(Germany) Michael Bonk	2, 6
(Switzerland) Hofor Racing by Bonk Motorsport	BMW M2 ClubSport Racing	BMW S55B30T0 3.0 L I6	332	(Germany) Volker Piepmeyer	2
(United Kingdom) WEC Motorsport	BMW M3 E46	BMW 3.0 L I6	339	(United Kingdom) David Cox	3
(United Kingdom) WEC Motorsport	BMW M3 E46	BMW 3.0 L I6	339	(United Kingdom) Adam Sharpe	3
(United Kingdom) WEC Motorsport	BMW M3 E46	BMW 3.0 L I6	339	(United Kingdom) George Haynes	3

== Race results ==
Bold indicates overall winner.

Event	Circuit	TCR Winners	TCX Winners	TC Winners	Report
1	(United Arab Emirates) Dubai Autodrome	**(Thailand) No. 159 BBR – Billionaire Boys Racing**	(France) No. 202 Les Deux Arbres	No entries	Report
1	(United Arab Emirates) Dubai Autodrome	**(Thailand) Anusorn Asiralertsiri** **(Thailand) Kantadhee Kusiri** **(Thailand) Kantasak Kusiri** **(Thailand) Chariya Nuya** **(Thailand) Tanart Sathienthirakul**	(France) Jack Leconte (France) Antoine Lepesqueux (France) Christophe Bouchut (Switzerland) Patrick Zacchia (Switzerland) Steve Zacchia	No entries	Report
2	(Italy) Mugello	**(Thailand) No. 159 BBR – Billionaire Boys Racing**	(France) No. 215 SK Racing	(Germany) No. 332 Hofor Racing by Bonk Motorsport	Report
2	(Italy) Mugello	**(Thailand) Kantadhee Kusiri** **(Thailand) Kantasak Kusiri** **(Thailand) Pasarit Promsombat** **(Thailand) Tanart Sathienthirakul**	(France) Jérôme Dacosta (France) Franck Eburderie (France) Franck Lavergne (France) Franco Lemma	(Germany) Michael Bonk (Germany) Michael Mayer (Germany) Jürgen Meyer (Germany) Volker Piepmeyer	Report
3	(Belgium) Spa-Francorchamps				Report
4	(Germany) Hockenheimring				Report
5	(Portugal) Algarve				Report
6	(Spain) Barcelona				Report
7	Kuwait Motor Town				Report
