= Team Eakie =

Thai auto racing team

(Thailand) Team Eakie
- Founded: 2006
- Team principal(s): Anothai Eamlumnow; Anusorn Asiralertsiri
- Current series: TCR International Series
- Noted drivers: TCR; 15. (Thailand) Kantadhee Kusiri

Team Eakie is a Thai auto racing team based in Bangkok, Thailand. The team has raced in the TCR International Series, since 2016. Having previously raced in the Thailand Super Series amongst others.

== Thailand Super Series ==
The team made their debut in the Thailand Super Series in 2006. The team has had much success in the series and in other Thai racing series', amongst them the Thai Endurance Series. They don't race in the Thailand Super Series today, but has had several races wins and podium in the years they raced there.

== TCR International Series ==
=== Honda Civic TCR (2016–) ===
Returning to racing the team entered the 2016 TCR International Series with Euroformula regular Kantadhee Kusiri driving a Honda Civic TCR.
