= 2017 TCR Thailand Touring Car Championship =

The 2017 TCR Thailand Touring Car Championship was the second season of the TCR Thailand Touring Car Championship. The championship ran within the Thailand Super Series' events.

== Teams and drivers ==
Team	Car	No.	Drivers	Class	Rounds
(Thailand) Sloth Racing	Volkswagen Golf GTI TCR	7	(Thailand) Paritat Bulbon	PA	1
(Thailand) RMI Racing Team By Sunoco	SEAT León TCR	14	(Thailand) Pasarit Promsombat	PA	All
(Thailand) RMI Racing Team By Sunoco	SEAT León TCR	96	(Thailand) Nattanid Leewattanavaragul	AM	2
(Thailand) Billionaire Boys Racing	Honda Civic TCR	15	(Thailand) Chariya Nuya	AM	All
(Thailand) Yontrakit Racing Team	SEAT León TCR	38	(Thailand) Rattanin Leenutaphong	AM	All
(Malaysia) Viper Niza Racing	SEAT León Cup Racer	65	(Malaysia) Douglas Khoo	AM	1–2, 4–5
(Thailand) TBN MK Ihere Racing Team	Honda Civic TCR	66	(Thailand) Nattachak Hanjitkasen	AM	All
Singha Motorsport Team Thailand	SEAT León Cup Racer	89	(Thailand) Kittipol Pramoj Na Ayudhya	PA	1–3, 5
(Thailand) Vattana Motorsport	SEAT León Cup Racer	93	(Thailand) Settasit Boonyakiat	PA	3, 5
(Thailand) Morin Racing Team	SEAT León Cup Racer	96	(Thailand) Nattanid Leewattanavaragul	AM	1, 3–5

== Calendar and results ==
The 2017 schedule was announced in January 2017.

Rnd.		Circuit	Date	Pole position	Fastest lap	Winning driver	Winning team	Supporting
1	1	Chang International Circuit, Buriram	29 April	(Thailand) Chariya Nuya	(Thailand) Chariya Nuya	(Thailand) Chariya Nuya	(Thailand) Billionaire Boys Racing	
1	2	Chang International Circuit, Buriram	30 April		(Thailand) Pasarit Promsombat	(Thailand) Kittipol Pramoj Na Ayudhya	Singha Motorsport Team Thailand	
2	3	Bangsaen Street Circuit, Chonburi	1 July	(Thailand) Kittipol Pramoj Na Ayudhya	(Thailand) Pasarit Promsombat	(Thailand) Pasarit Promsombat	(Thailand) RMI Racing Team	TCR Asia Series
2	4	Bangsaen Street Circuit, Chonburi	2 July		(Thailand) Pasarit Promsombat	(Thailand) Nattanid Leewattanavaragul	(Thailand) RMI Racing Team	TCR Asia Series
3	5	Chang International Circuit, Buriram	19 August	(Thailand) Pasarit Promsombat	(Thailand) Chariya Nuya	(Thailand) Pasarit Promsombat	(Thailand) RMI Racing Team	
3	6	Chang International Circuit, Buriram	20 August		(Thailand) Chariya Nuya	(Thailand) Chariya Nuya	(Thailand) Billionaire Boys Racing	
4	7	Chang International Circuit, Buriram	3 September	(Thailand) Chariya Nuya	(Thailand) Nattanid Leewattanavaragul	(Thailand) Chariya Nuya	(Thailand) Billionaire Boys Racing	TCR International Series
4	8	Chang International Circuit, Buriram	3 September		(Thailand) Pasarit Promsombat	(Thailand) Chariya Nuya	(Thailand) Billionaire Boys Racing	TCR International Series
5	9	Chang International Circuit, Buriram	24 September	(Thailand) Pasarit Promsombat	(Thailand) Pasarit Promsombat	(Thailand) Pasarit Promsombat	(Thailand) RMI Racing Team	
5	10	Chang International Circuit, Buriram	24 September		(Thailand) Chariya Nuya	(Thailand) Chariya Nuya	(Thailand) Billionaire Boys Racing	

== Drivers' championship ==
Pos.	Driver	BUR		CHO		BUR		BUR		BUR		Pts.
Pos.	Driver	RD1	RD2	RD1	RD2	RD1	RD2	RD1	RD2	RD1	RD2	Pts.
Pro-Am
1	(Thailand) Pasarit Promsombat ‡	**2**	**7**	3	**5**	**1**	2	**23†**	**18**	**1**	**2**	193
2	(Thailand) Kittipol Pramoj Na Ayudhya	7	1	**Ret**	DNS	DNS	7			DNS	DNS	58
3	(Thailand) Settasit Boonyakiat					4	**4**			DNS	DNS	36
4	(Thailand) Paritat Bulbon	DNS	DNS									0
Am
1	(Thailand) Chariya Nuya	**1**	2	5	13†	5	**1**	**15**	**16**	**2**	1	208
2	(Thailand) Nattanid Leewattanavaragul	4	4	**4**	**3**	**2**	3	16	17	5	3	189
3	(Thailand) Nattachak Hanjitkasen	3	3	7	9	6†	6	18	20	4	4	135
4	(Thailand) Rattanin Leenutaphong	6	5	Ret	15†	3	5	17	19	3	5	115
5	(Malaysia) Douglas Khoo	5	**6**	Ret	12†			20	21	6	6	62
Pos.	Driver	BUR		CHO		BUR		BUR		BUR		Pts.

Colour	Result
Gold	Winner
Silver	Second place
Bronze	Third place
Green	Points classification
Blue	Non-points classification
Blue	Non-classified finish (NC)
Purple	Retired, not classified (Ret)
Red	Did not qualify (DNQ)
Red	Did not pre-qualify (DNPQ)
Black	Disqualified (DSQ)
White	Did not start (DNS)
White	Withdrew (WD)
White	Race cancelled (C)
Blank	Did not practice (DNP)
Blank	Did not arrive (DNA)
Blank	Excluded (EX)

**Bold** – Pole
Italics – Fastest Lap

Notes:

- † – Drivers did not finish the race, but were classified as they completed over 75% of the race distance.
- ‡ – Pasarit Promsombat did not score any points at the fourth round of the championship, as he was the only Pro-Am entry.
