= Yontrakit Racing Team =

(Thailand) Yontrakit Racing Team
- Team principal(s): Sornchat Tantipirom
- Current series: TCR International Series; TCR Thailand Series; Thailand Super Series
- Noted drivers: TCR; 83. (Thailand) Rattanin Leenutaphong; TCR Thailand; 38. (Thailand) Rattanin Leenutaphong

Yontrakit Racing Team is a Thai auto racing team based in Bangkok, Thailand. The team has raced in the TCR International Series, since 2017. The team also races in the TCR Thailand Touring Car Championship and Thailand Super Series.

== TCR Thailand Touring Car Championship ==
Having first entered the championship in 2016, running a single SEAT León Cup Racer, driver Rattanin Leenutaphong had an impressive debut in the Am class, finishing first and second in the two races. They returned in 2017 running an updated SEAT León TCR for 2016 driver Rattanin Leenutaphong. With Leenutaphong having taken several podiums in Am class, during the season.

== TCR International Series ==
=== SEAT León TCR (2017–) ===
After having raced in the TCR Thailand Touring Car Championship, the team entered the 2017 TCR International Series with Rattanin Leenutaphong driving a SEAT León TCR.
