= Nattanid Leewattanavaragul =

Thai racing driver (born 1993)

- Nationality: Thai
- Born: 16 May 1993 (age 33) Bangkok, Thailand

TCR International Series career
- Debut season: 2017
- Current team: Morin Racing Team
- Categorisation: FIA Silver
- Car number: 96
- Starts: 2

Previous series
- 2017 2016 2015 2013-14: TCR Thailand Touring Car Championship; Thailand Super Series - Super Production Class B Thailand Super Series - Super Production Class C Toyota Motorsport Trophy Thailand

Championship titles
- 2015 2014: Thailand Super Series - Super Production Class B Toyota Motorsport Trophy Thailand - Ladies Cup

Nattanid Leewattanavaragul (Thai: ณัฐนิช ลีวัฒนาวรากุล; born 16 May 1993) is a Thai racing driver currently competing in the TCR International Series and TCR Thailand Touring Car Championship. Having previously competed in the Thailand Super Series and Toyota Motorsport Trophy Thailand amongst others.

== Racing career ==
Leewattanavaragul began her career in 2013 in the Toyota Motorsport Trophy Thailand series, finishing the season fourth in the standings. She stayed in the series for 2014, winning the Ladies Cup that year. For 2015, she switched to the Thailand Super Series, entering the Super Production C Class, Winning the class at the end of the season. In 2016, she entered the Super Production D Class of the Thailand Super Series, finishing the sixth in the championship standings. For the 2017 season, she switched to the TCR Thailand Touring Car Championship, driving a SEAT León TCR for her own Morin Racing Team, she took her first victory in the series in the second race held at the Bangsaen Street Circuit.

In August 2017, it was announced that Leewattanavaragul would race in the TCR International Series, driving an SEAT León TCR for her own TCR Thailand team Morin Racing Team.

== Racing record ==
=== Complete TCR International Series results ===
(key) (Races in bold indicate pole position) (Races in italics indicate fastest lap)

Year	Team	Car	1	2	3	4	5	6	7	8	9	10	11	12	13	14	15	16	17	18	19	20	DC	Points
2017	Morin Racing Team	SEAT León TCR	GEO; 1	GEO; 2	BHR; 1	BHR; 2	BEL; 1	BEL; 2	ITA; 1	ITA; 2	AUT; 1	AUT; 2	HUN; 1	HUN; 2	GER; 1	GER; 2	THA; 1; 16	THA; 2; 17	CHN; 1	CHN; 2	ABU; 1	ABU; 2	NC*	0*

^{†} Driver did not finish the race, but was classified as he completed over 90% of the race distance.
^{*} Season still in progress.
