= Rattanin Leenutaphong =

Thai racing driver

- Nationality: Thai
- Born: 24 April 1990 (age 36) Bangkok, Thailand

TCR International Series career
- Debut season: 2017
- Current team: Yontrakit Racing Team
- Car number: 83
- Starts: 2

Previous series
- 2016-17 2015: TCR Thailand Touring Car Championship; Thailand Super Series - Super Eco Class

Rattanin Leenutaphong (born 24 April 1990) is a Thai racing driver currently competing in the TCR International Series and TCR Thailand Touring Car Championship. Having previously competed in the Thailand Super Series - Super Eco Class.

== Racing career ==
Leenutaphong began his career in 2015 in the Thailand Super Series' Super Eco class. In 2016, he switched to the TCR Thailand Touring Car Championship, he finished the season third in the Am standings that year, after only taking part in one race weekend. He stayed in the series for 2017, this time entering the series full time. Again driving a SEAT León TCR for Yontrakit Racing Team.

In August 2017, it was announced that Leenutaphong would race in the TCR International Series, driving an SEAT León TCR for his TCR Thailand team Yontrakit Racing Team.

== Racing record ==
=== Complete TCR International Series results ===
(key) (Races in bold indicate pole position) (Races in italics indicate fastest lap)

Year	Team	Car	1	2	3	4	5	6	7	8	9	10	11	12	13	14	15	16	17	18	19	20	DC	Points
2017	Yontrakit Racing Team	SEAT León TCR	GEO; 1	GEO; 2	BHR; 1	BHR; 2	BEL; 1	BEL; 2	ITA; 1	ITA; 2	AUT; 1	AUT; 2	HUN; 1	HUN; 2	GER; 1	GER; 2	THA; 1; 17	THA; 2; 19	CHN; 1	CHN; 2	ABU; 1	ABU; 2	NC*	0*

^{†} Driver did not finish the race, but was classified as he completed over 90% of the race distance.
^{*} Season still in progress.
