= Kantadhee Kusiri =

Thai racing driver (born 1993)

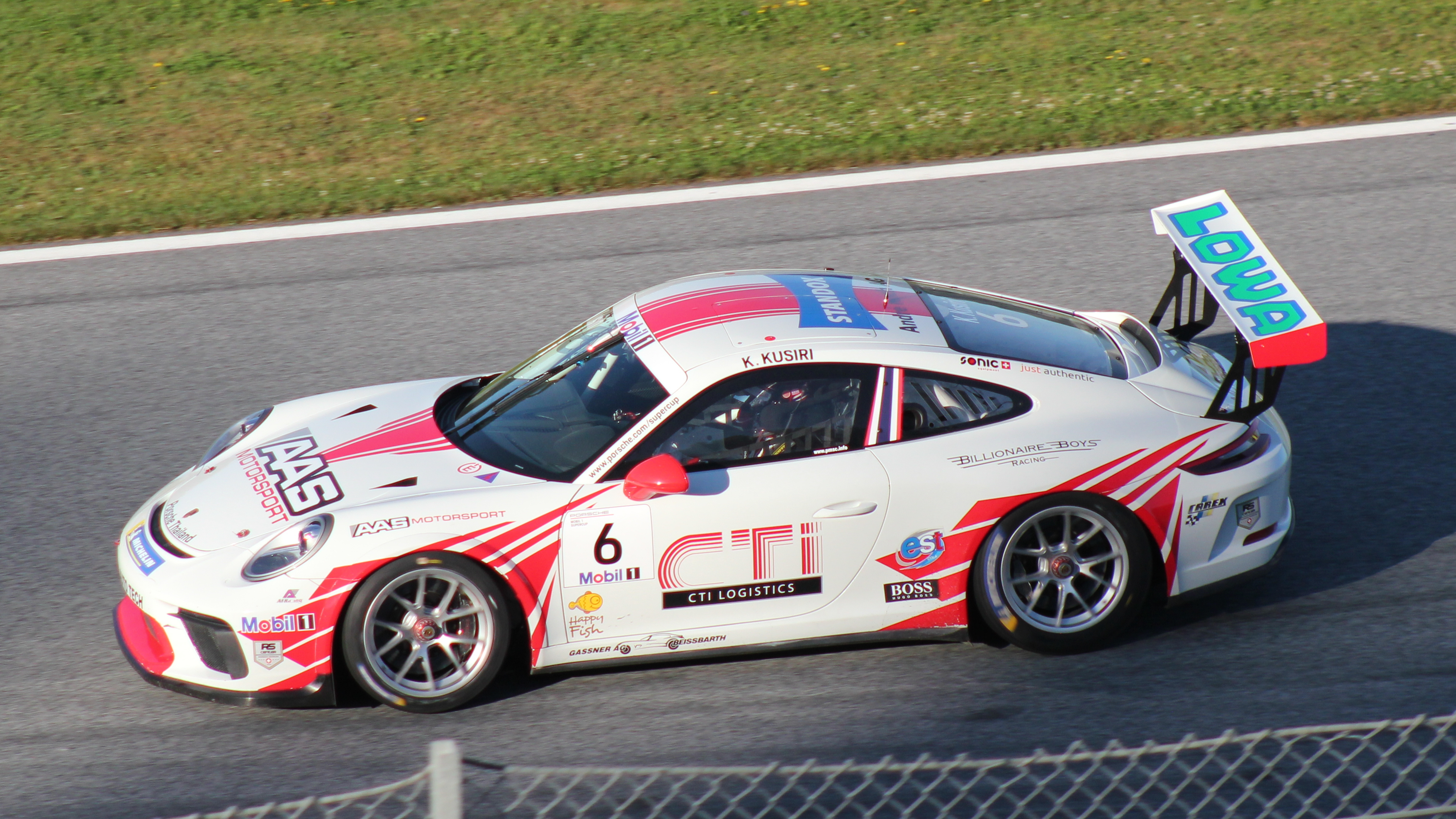
- Nationality: (Thailand) Thai
- Born: 19 May 1993 (age 33) Chonburi, Thailand
- Relatives: Kantasak Kusiri (brother)

GT World Challenge Asia career
- Debut season: 2022
- Current team: AAS Motorsport
- Years active: 2022
- Car number: 18
- Finished last season

24H TCE Series career
- Debut season: 2019
- Current team: Billionaire Boys Racing
- Years active: 2019-2022
- Car number: 158
- Former teams: Monlau Competición

Previous series
- 2022 2019-2022 2016 2015-16 2013 2013-15 2012 2011, 14 2010 2009: GT World Challenge Asia; 24H TCE Series; TCR Thailand Series; Euroformula Open Championship; Sepang 12 Hours; Thailand Super Series; Thai Touring Car Series; Pro Racing Series; Thai Honda Jazz Cup; Thai Honda Civic Racing Festival

Championship titles
- 2013 2013 2011, 14 2010: Sepang 12 Hours - Touring Production; Thailand Super Series - S1500; Pro Racing Series; Thai Honda Jazz Cup

Kantadhee Kusiri (born 19 May 1993) is a Thai racing driver currently competing in the TCR International Series and TCR Thailand Touring Car Championship. Having previously competed in the Thailand Super Series, Pro Racing Series and Thai Honda Jazz Cup amongst others.

== Racing career ==
Kusiri began his career in 2009 in the Thai Honda Civic Racing Festival, he finished second in the championship standings that year. He switched to the Thai Honda Jazz Cup in 2010 and won the title that year. In 2011, he switched to the Pro Racing Series, winning the championship twice in 2011 and 2014. For 2012, he switched to the Thai Touring Car Series, finishing second in the championship that year. He switched to the Thailand Super Series for 2013, winning the S1500 class that season, he also took part in the Sepang 12 Hours that year, winning the Touring Production class. In 2014, he continued in the Thailand Super Series, finishing third in the S2000 class in both 2014 and 2015. He switched to the Euroformula Open Championship for 2015 doing a partial season, before returning for a full season in 2016.

In August 2016, it was announced that Kusiri would race in the TCR International Series, driving a Honda Civic TCR for Team Eakie BBR Kaiten.

== Racing record ==
=== Complete TCR International Series results ===
(key) (Races in bold indicate pole position) (Races in italics indicate fastest lap)

Year	Team	Car	1	2	3	4	5	6	7	8	9	10	11	12	13	14	15	16	17	18	19	20	21	22	DC	Points
2016	Team Eakie BBR Kaiten	Honda Civic TCR	BHR; 1	BHR; 2	POR; 1	POR; 2	BEL; 1	BEL; 2	ITA; 1	ITA; 2	AUT; 1	AUT; 2	GER; 1	GER; 2	RUS; 1	RUS; 2	THA; 1; 6	THA; 2; 9	SIN; 1	SIN; 2	MYS; 1	MYS; 2	MAC; 1	MAC; 2	21st	10
2017	WestCoast Racing	Volkswagen Golf GTI TCR	GEO; 1	GEO; 2	BHR; 1	BHR; 2	BEL; 1	BEL; 2	ITA; 1	ITA; 2	AUT; 1	AUT; 2	HUN; 1	HUN; 2	GER; 1	GER; 2	THA; 1; 12	THA; 2; 10	CHN; 1	CHN; 2	DUB; 1	DUB; 2			34th	1

=== Complete Porsche Supercup results ===
(key) (Races in bold indicate pole position) (Races in italics indicate fastest lap)

Year	Team	1	2	3	4	5	6	7	8	9	10	Pos.	Points
2019	Fach Auto Tech	CAT; 17	MON; 11	RBR; 16	SIL; 23	HOC; 16^{⹋}	HUN; Ret	SPA; 19	MNZ; 20	MEX; 10	MEX; 14	15th	14

^{⹋} No points awarded as less than 50% of race distance was completed.
