= Pasarit Promsombat =

Thai racing driver

- Nationality: Thai
- Born: 5 March 1983 (age 43) Bangkok, Thailand

TCR International Series career
- Debut season: 2017
- Current team: RMI Racing Team by Sunoco
- Car number: 84
- Starts: 2

Previous series
- 2017 2016 2014-16 2013, 15 2012 2009 2009-10 2008, 10 2008 2007, 11-13 2005: TCR Thailand Touring Car Championship; Buriram 6 Hours; Thailand Super Series; Bangsaen 6 Hours; Thailand Super Series - Class Super Production 1500; Honda Jazz Series Thailand; Thailand Super Series - Class 2000; Honda Pro Cup Thailand; Puma FAEast Series; Honda Racing Festival Thailand Thailand Yokohama Gymkhana Championship

Championship titles
- 2014-16 2013, 15 2010 2009 2009-10 2007, 11-13: Thailand Super Series; Bangsaen 6 Hours; Honda Pro Cup Thailand; Honda Jazz Series Thailand; Thailand Super Series - Class 2000; Honda Racing Festival Thailand

Pasarit Promsombat (born 5 March 1983) is a Thai racing driver currently competing in the TCR International Series and TCR Thailand Touring Car Championship. Having previously competed in the Thailand Super Series and Honda Pro Cup Thailand amongst others.

== Racing career ==
Promsombat began his career in 2005 in the Thailand Yokohama Gymkhana Championship. In 2007 he switched to the Honda Racing Festival Thailand winning his class that year, returning for the event and winning his class in 2011, 2012 and 2013. For 2008, he switched to the Puma FAEast Series taking four wins. He also raced in the Honda Pro Cup Thailand that year, also taking several victories. In 2009, he made his Thailand Super Series debut, winning the 2000 Class that year and returning the following year also winning the class. In 2009, he also took part in the Honda Jazz Series Thailand, winning the title the same year. For 2012, he returned to the Thailand Super Series, this time entering the Super Production 1500 Class, eventually winning the class. In 2013 and 2014, he took part in the Bangsaen 6 Hours endurance race, winning the race on both occasions. He once again entered the Thailand Super Series in 2014, continuing in the series for three seasons through the 2016 season. Eventually winning his class all three years. In 2016, he entered the Buriram 6 Hours endurance race, going on to eventually win the race. For the 2017 season, he switched to the TCR Thailand Touring Car Championship, driving a SEAT León TCR for his own RMI Racing Team by Sunoco.

In August 2017, it was announced that Promsombat would race in the TCR International Series, driving an SEAT León TCR for his own TCR Thailand team RMI Racing Team by Sunoco.

== Racing record ==
=== Complete TCR International Series results ===
(key) (Races in bold indicate pole position) (Races in italics indicate fastest lap)

Year	Team	Car	1	2	3	4	5	6	7	8	9	10	11	12	13	14	15	16	17	18	19	20	DC	Points
2017	RMI Racing Team by Sunoco	SEAT León TCR	GEO; 1	GEO; 2	BHR; 1	BHR; 2	BEL; 1	BEL; 2	ITA; 1	ITA; 2	AUT; 1	AUT; 2	HUN; 1	HUN; 2	GER; 1	GER; 2	THA; 1; 23†	THA; 2; 18	CHN; 1	CHN; 2	ABU; 1	ABU; 2	NC*	0*

^{†} Driver did not finish the race, but was classified as he completed over 90% of the race distance.
^{*} Season still in progress.
