= Chariya Nuya =

Thai racing driver (born 1987)

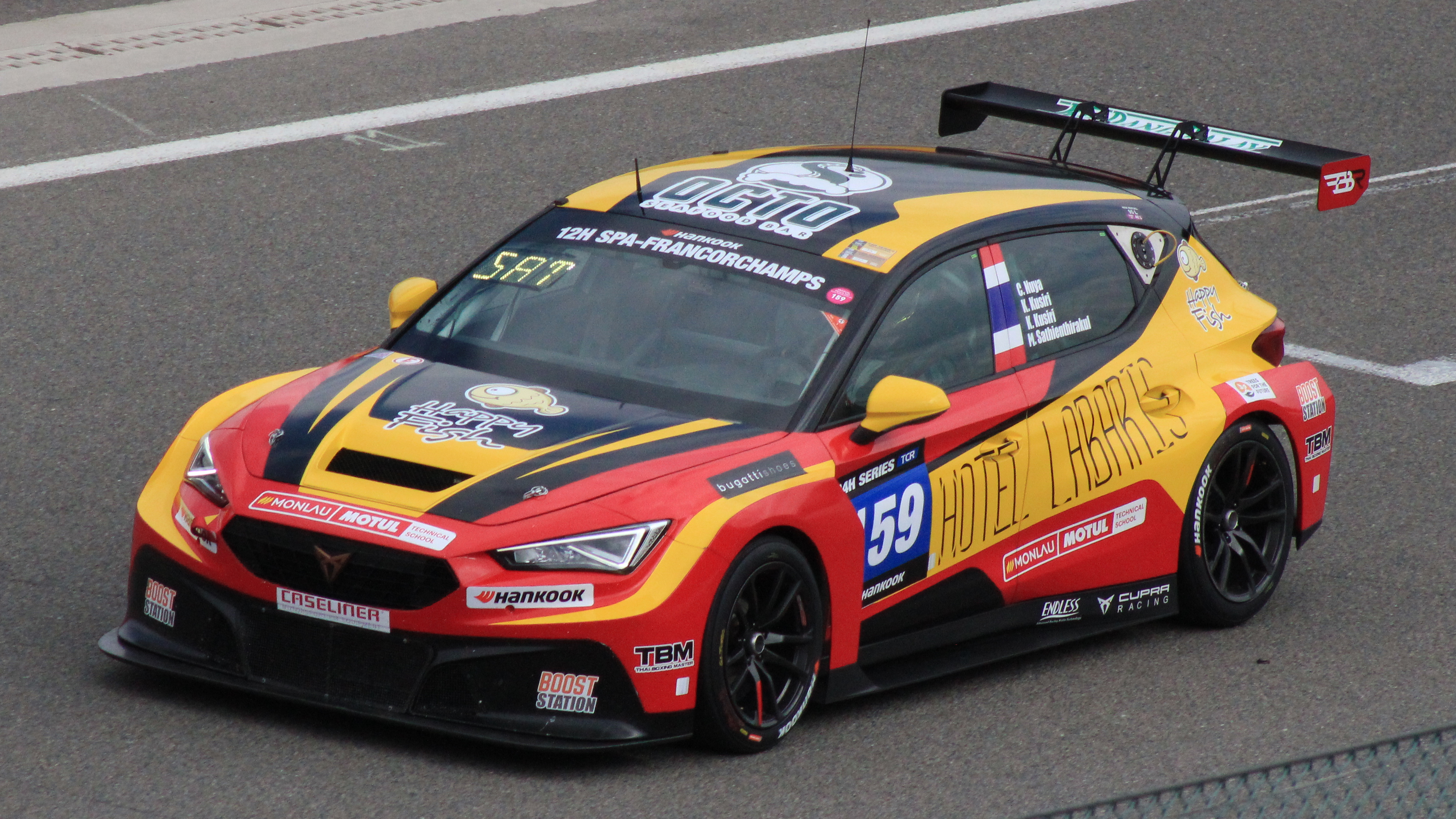
- Nationality: Thai
- Born: 25 October 1987 (age 39) Bangkok, Thailand

TCR International Series career
- Debut season: 2017
- Current team: Billionaire Boys Racing
- Categorisation: FIA Silver
- Car number: 85
- Starts: 2

Previous series
- 2016-17: TCR Thailand Touring Car Championship

Chariya Nuya (born 25 October 1987) is a Thai racing driver currently competing in the TCR International Series and TCR Thailand Touring Car Championship.

== Racing career ==
Nuya began his career in 2016 in the TCR Thailand Touring Car Championship, driving a Honda Civic TCR for Billionaire Boys Racing, he took his first victory in his first race in the series' Am class. For the 2017 season, he stayed in the TCR Thailand Touring Car Championship, driving an updated Honda Civic Type-R TCR still run by Billionaire Boys Racing. He has taken four victories so far this season.

In August 2017 it was announced that Nuya would race in the TCR International Series, driving a Honda Civic Type-R TCR for his TCR Thailand team Billionaire Boys Racing.

== Racing record ==
=== Complete TCR International Series results ===
(key) (Races in bold indicate pole position) (Races in italics indicate fastest lap)

Year	Team	Car	1	2	3	4	5	6	7	8	9	10	11	12	13	14	15	16	17	18	19	20	DC	Points
2017	Billionaire Boys Racing	Honda Civic Type-R TCR	GEO; 1	GEO; 2	BHR; 1	BHR; 2	BEL; 1	BEL; 2	ITA; 1	ITA; 2	AUT; 1	AUT; 2	HUN; 1	HUN; 2	GER; 1	GER; 2	THA; 1; 15	THA; 2; 16	CHN; 1	CHN; 2	ABU; 1	ABU; 2	NC*	0*

^{†} Driver did not finish the race, but was classified as he completed over 90% of the race distance.
^{*} Season still in progress.
