= Billionaire Boys Racing =

(Thailand) Billionaire Boys Racing
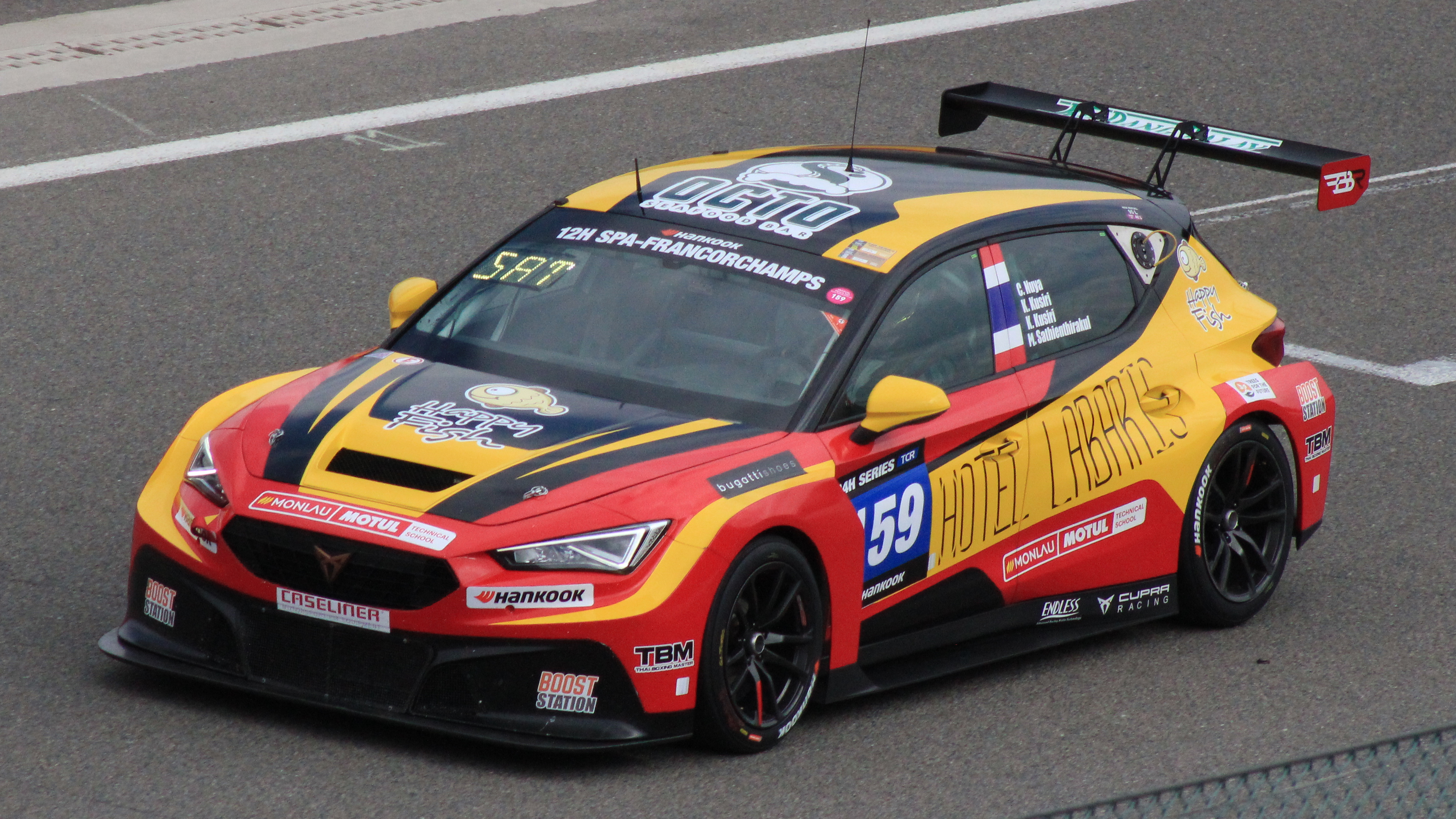
- Team principal(s): Anusorn Asiralertsiri
- Current series: TCR International Series; TCR Thailand Series; Thailand Super Series
- Noted drivers: TCR; 85. (Thailand) Chariya Nuya; TCR Thailand; 15. (Thailand) Chariya Nuya

Billionaire Boys Racing (BBR) is a Thai auto racing team based in Nonthaburi, Thailand. The team has raced in the TCR International Series, since 2017. The team also races in the TCR Thailand Touring Car Championship and Thailand Super Series.

== TCR Thailand Touring Car Championship ==
Having first entered the championship in 2016, running a single Honda Civic TCR, driver Chariya Nuya had an impressive debut in the Am class, finishing first and third in the two races. They returned in 2017 running an updated Honda Civic Type-R TCR for 2016 driver Chariya Nuya. With Nuya having taken several overall victories and pole positions, while still entered in the Am class.

== TCR International Series ==
=== Honda Civic Type-R TCR (2017–) ===
After having raced in the TCR Thailand Touring Car Championship, the team entered the 2017 TCR International Series with Chariya Nuya driving a Honda Civic Type-R TCR.
