= TBN MK Racing Team =

(Thailand) TBN MK Racing Team
- Founded: 2004
- Team principal(s): Wijak Lertprasertpakorn
- Current series: TCR International Series
- Noted drivers: TCR; 66. (Thailand) Nattachak Hanjitkasen; TCR Asia; 66. (Thailand) Nattachak Hanjitkasen; TCR Thailand; 26. (Thailand) Wijak Lertprasertpakorn; 66. (Thailand) Nattachak Hanjitkasen

TBN MK Racing Team is a Thai auto racing team based in Bangkok, Thailand. The team has raced in the TCR International Series, since 2016. Having previously raced in the Thailand Super Series amongst others.

== Thailand Super Series ==
The team has had much success in the Thailand Super Series and still races there. They have drivers across many off the different division within the series, they have had several race wins and podiums in the years they have raced there.

For 2016 the team entered the new TCR Thailand Touring Car Championship, a new category in the Thailand Super Series. The team entered a Honda Civic TCR for Nattachak Hanjitkasen and Wijak Lertprasertpakorn each, with both cars being entered in the Am-class.

== TCR Asia Series ==
The team entered the 2016 TCR Asia Series round at Buriram with regular driver Nattachak Hanjitkasen driving the teams Honda Civic TCR, with regular TCR Thailand driver and team principal Wijak Lertprasertpakorn sitting that race out.

== TCR International Series ==
=== Honda Civic TCR (2016–) ===
After having raced in the TCR Thailand Touring Car Championship for most of 2016, the team entered the 2016 TCR International Series with regular driver Nattachak Hanjitkasen driving a Honda Civic TCR.
