= Honda Civic (ninth generation) =

Ninth generation of Honda Civic

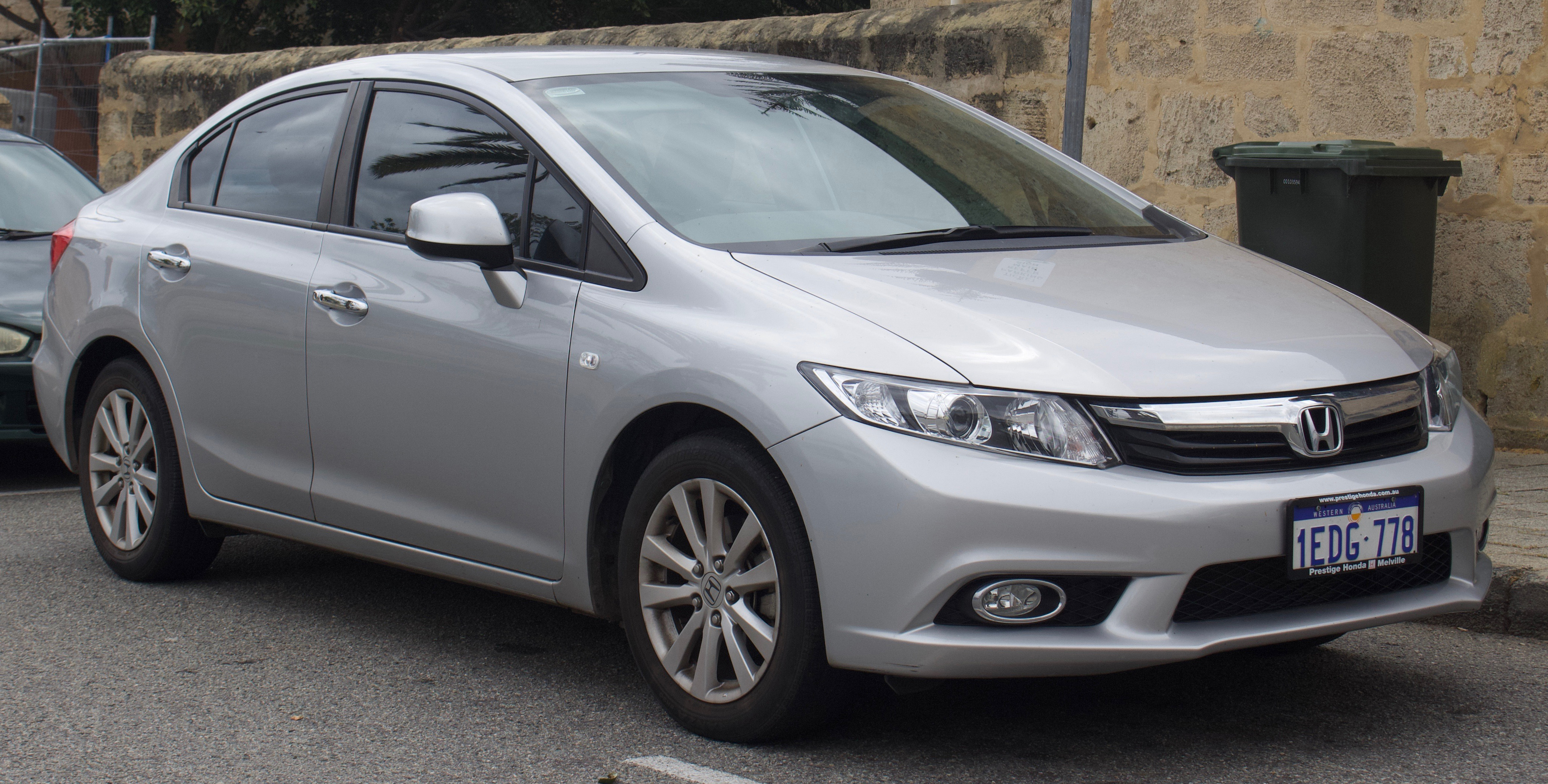
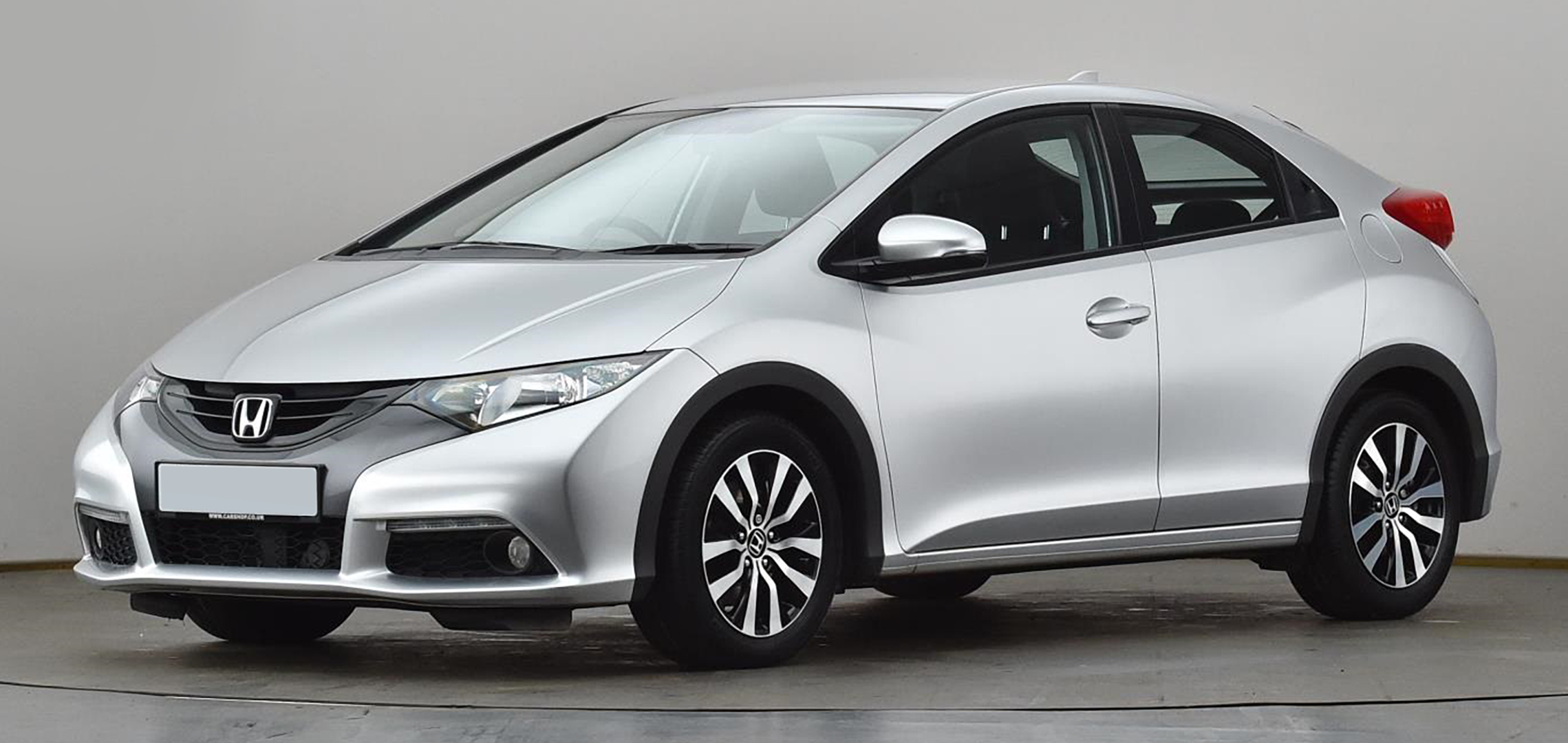

Overview
- Manufacturer: Honda
- Production: 2011–2017

Body and chassis
- Class: Compact car (C)
- Layout: Front-engine, front-wheel-drive
- Related: Acura ILX; Honda CR-V (fourth generation); Honda Insight; Honda Jade

Chronology
- Predecessor: Honda Civic (eighth generation)
- Successor: Honda Civic (tenth generation)

The ninth-generation Honda Civic is a range of compact cars (C-segment) manufactured by Honda between 2011 and 2016, replacing the eighth-generation Civic. It was launched in the North American market in April 2011, Europe in February 2012 and Asia-Pacific in early 2012. Four body styles were introduced throughout its production run, which are sedan, coupe, hatchback and a station wagon version marketed as the Civic Tourer. The latter two make up for the European-market Civic range, which was produced in Swindon, United Kingdom, and received a completely different design and smaller exterior size. The hatchback version forms a basis for a Civic Type R (FK2) model, which was released later in 2015.

Apart from the 750-unit limited run Civic Type R, versions of the ninth-generation Civic were not sold in Japan, creating a seven-year absence in the market until the release of the tenth-generation Civic in Japan in 2017. However, the ninth-generation Civic sedan was temporarily produced in Japan for exports in early 2012 due to suspended production in the Ayutthaya plant as the result of 2011 Thailand floods.

== Sedan/coupe (FB1–6, FG3–4; 2011) ==
Civic sedan/coupe
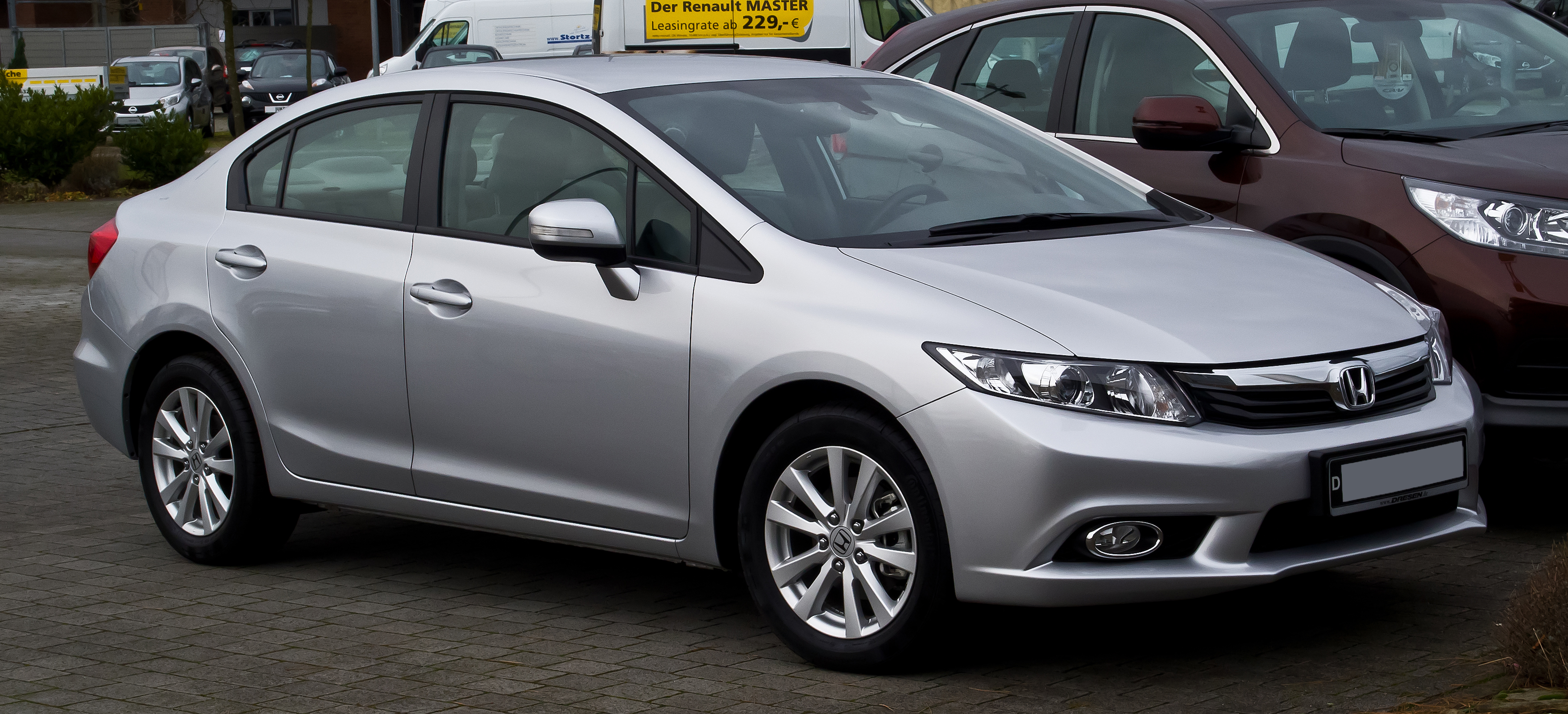
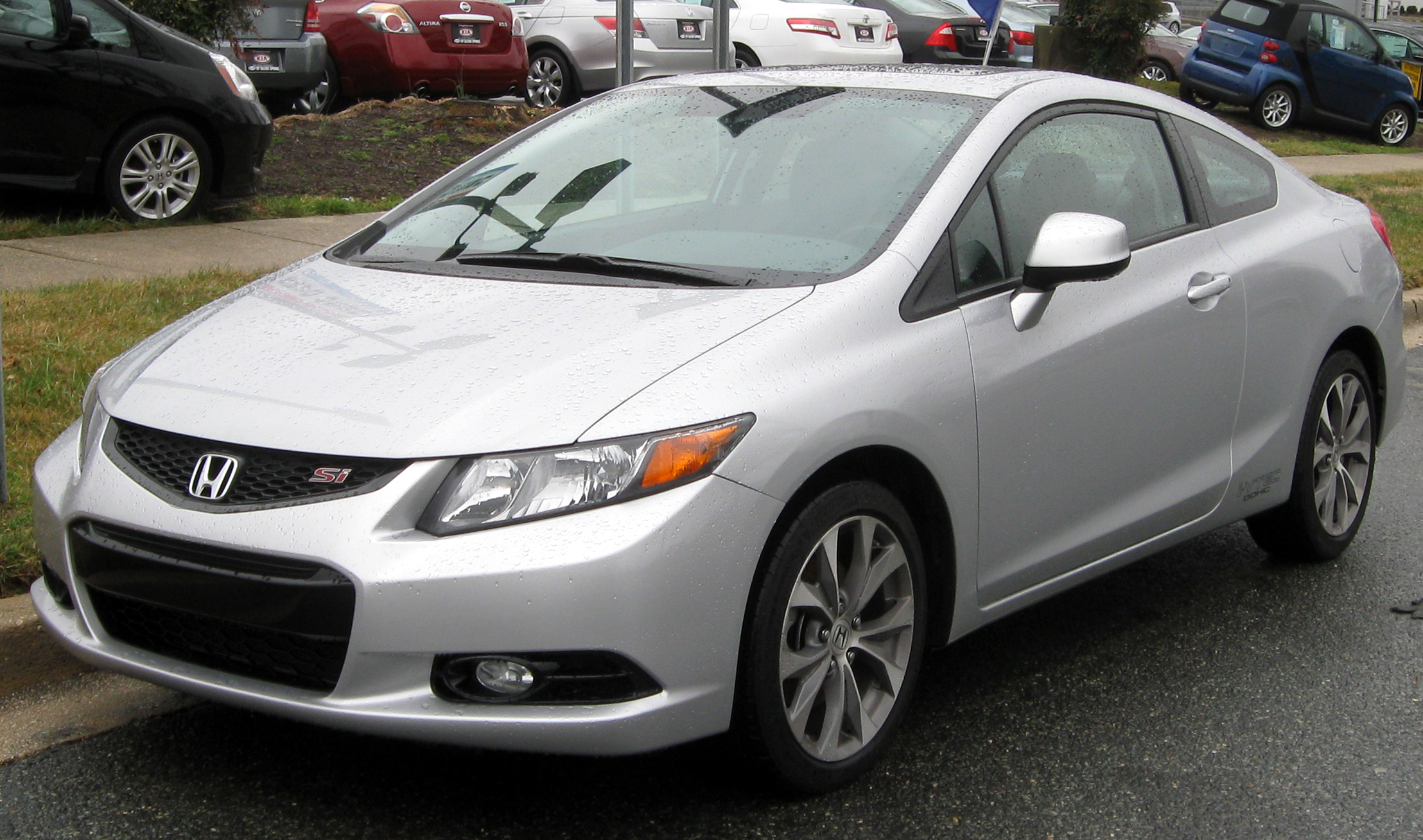

Overview
- Model code: FB1; FB2; FB3; FB4; FB5; FB6 (sedan); FG2; FG3; FG4 (coupe)
- Production: January 2011 – September 2015 (North America); 2011–2016 (Asia-Pacific)
- Model years: 2012–2015 (North America)
- Assembly: Japan: Suzuka, Mie; United States: Greensburg, Indiana (HMIN); Canada: Alliston, Ontario (HCM); Turkey: Gebze (Honda Türkiye); China: Wuhan (Dongfeng Honda); Taiwan: Pingtung; Thailand: Ayutthaya; Malaysia: Alor Gajah, Melaka; Brazil: Sumaré; Pakistan: Lahore (Honda Atlas); Vietnam: Vĩnh Phúc
- Designer: Toshiyuki Okumoto, Tsutomu Fujita and Atsushi Murakawa

Body and chassis
- Body style: 2-door coupe (FG3–4, North America); 4-door sedan (FB1–6)

Powertrain
- Engine: Petrol: 1.6 L R16A1 I4; 1.8 L R18Z1 I4; 2.0 L R20Z1 I4; 2.4 L K24Z7 i-VTEC DOHC I4; Petrol hybrid: 1.5 L LEA-MF6 + IMA I4; Petrol/CNG: 1.8 L R18Z1 I4
- Transmission: 5-speed automatic 5-speed manual 6-speed manual CVT
- Hybrid drivetrain: Parallel hybrid

Dimensions
- Wheelbase: 2,670 mm (105.1 in) (sedan); 2,620 mm (103.1 in) (coupe)
- Length: 4,557 mm (179.4 in) (sedan); 4,472 mm (176.1 in) (coupe)
- Width: 1,755 mm (69.1 in) (sedan, coupe & hybrid)
- Height: 1,430–1,435 mm (56.3–56.5 in) (sedan); 1,397 mm (55.0 in) (coupe)
- Curb weight: 1,177–1,260 kg (2,595–2,778 lb) (coupe); 1,183–1,270 kg (2,608–2,800 lb) (sedan); 1,280–1,304 kg (2,822–2,875 lb) (hybrid)

In May 2010, a Honda executive stated that the ninth-generation Civic was to be delayed into 2011 because of changing market conditions and tougher fuel economy and emissions regulations. On 13 December 2010, Honda unveiled a sketch of the new ninth generation Civic which was described as "energetic, sleek and aerodynamic." Both coupe and sedan concepts for the North American market were shown in January 2011. The production version of the ninth-generation North American Civic based on the revealed concepts went on sale in April 2011.

For markets outside North America, the Civic sedan received an altered styling as it is the case with the eighth-generation Civic. The styling debuted in China in October 2011, featuring redesigned front end, headlight clusters, rear trunk panel, redesigned centre console, as well as updated seats. It was also presented in Brazil in November 2011, and Thailand in March 2012, while it was sold in Australia from March 2012, and Europe in June 2012.

The vehicle features an all-new sheet metal, with a longer hood but still a familiar profile—Honda calls it the "one-motion" design. The new model is slightly smaller and lighter than the outgoing models. The Civic was originally planned to become bigger, but after the global crisis in 2008, Honda wanted to make the car smaller, lighter and more fuel-efficient, while increasing space inside.

Honda CEO Takanobu Ito explained that the ninth-generation Civic was developed during the 2008 financial crisis, which led the company to believe that consumers would be willing to forego upscale content and quality in new vehicles as long as they were fuel efficient and affordable. The decision backfired, as rival automakers increased the quality and feature content of their compact vehicles around the same time, pushing sales of Civic rivals such as the Ford Focus and Hyundai Elantra to new heights in the US. Following negative response from journalists and decreasing sales figures, Ito took responsibility for the vehicle's abysmal performance in the US.

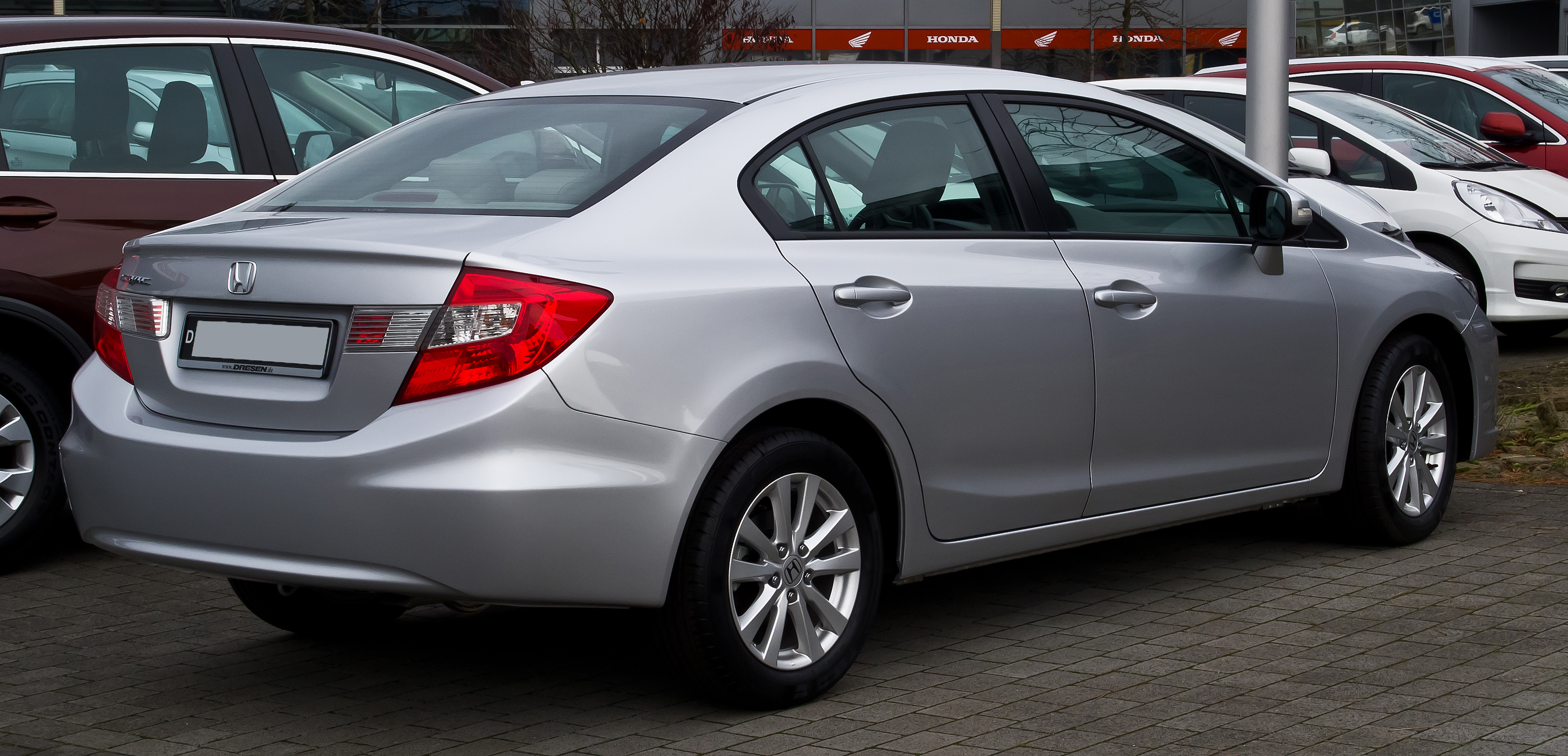
Rear view

=== North America ===
After the coupe and sedan prototype model for the North American market were showcased on 10 January 2011, at the North American International Auto Show, the production version went on sale on 20 April 2011, for the 2012 model year. Petrol, hybrid and natural gas variants were offered. The petrol-engine lineup included a sedan and coupe. Both of them were also offered in Si performance versions.

==== Sedan ====
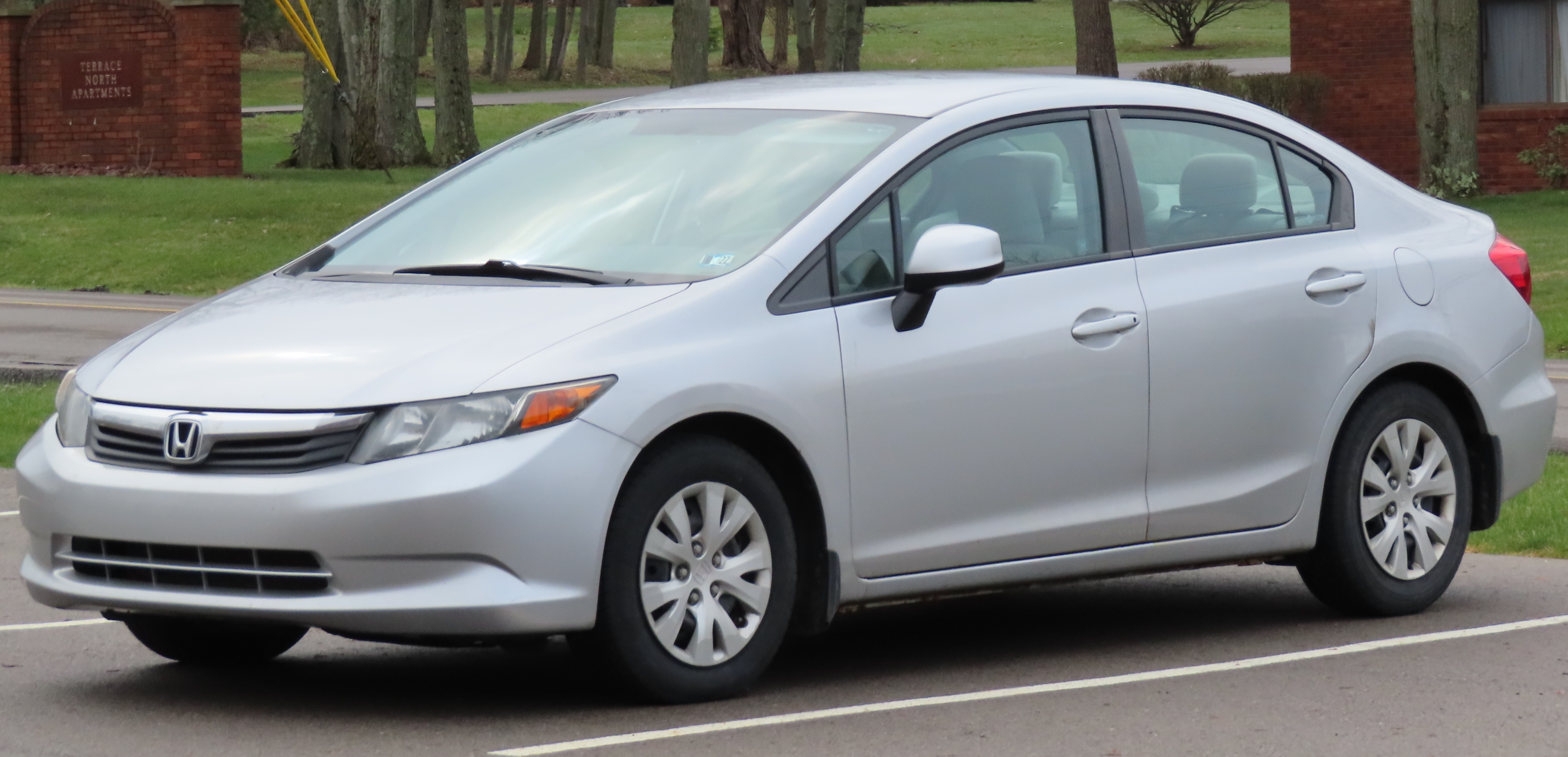
Pre-facelift

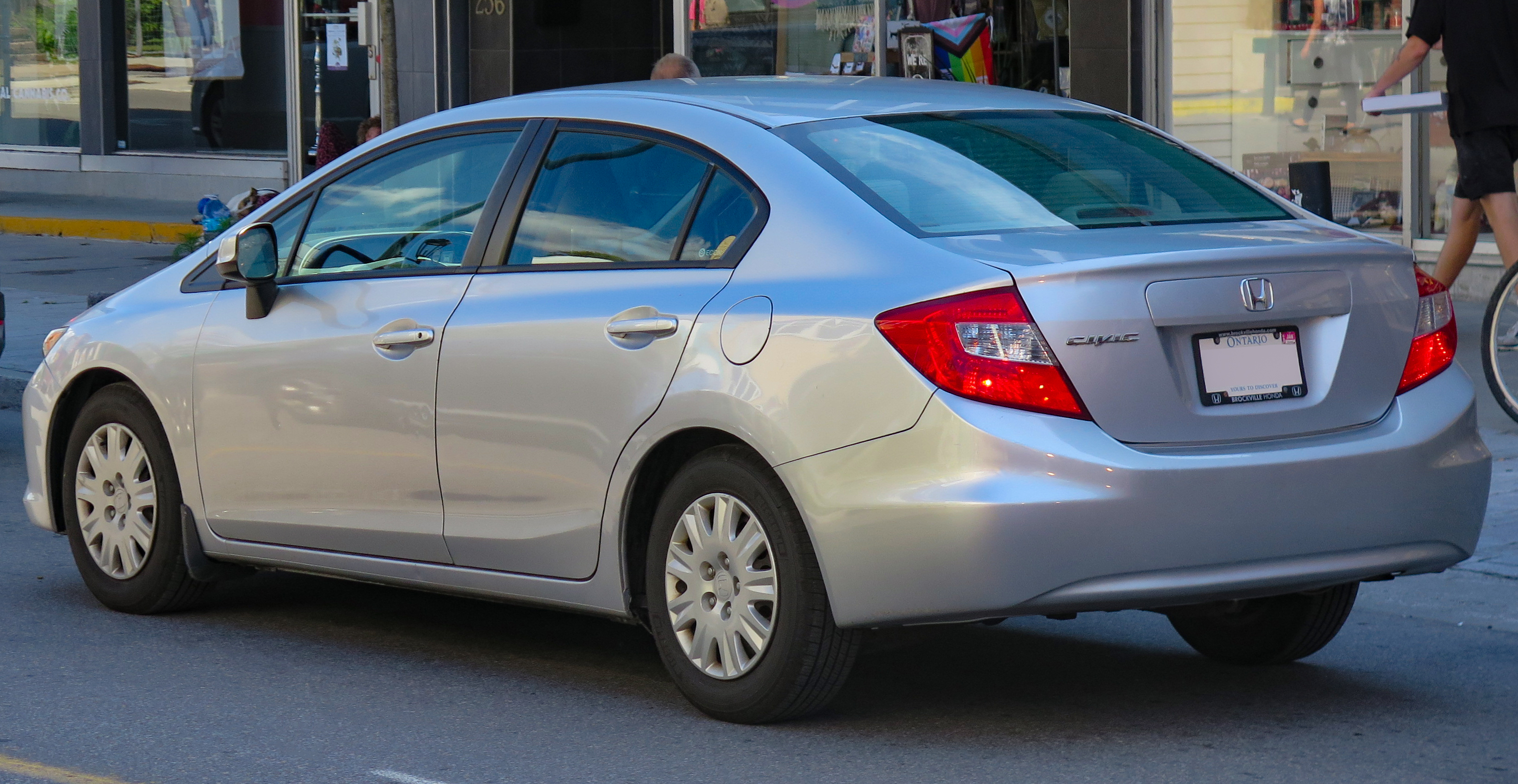
Pre-facelift

==== Coupe ====
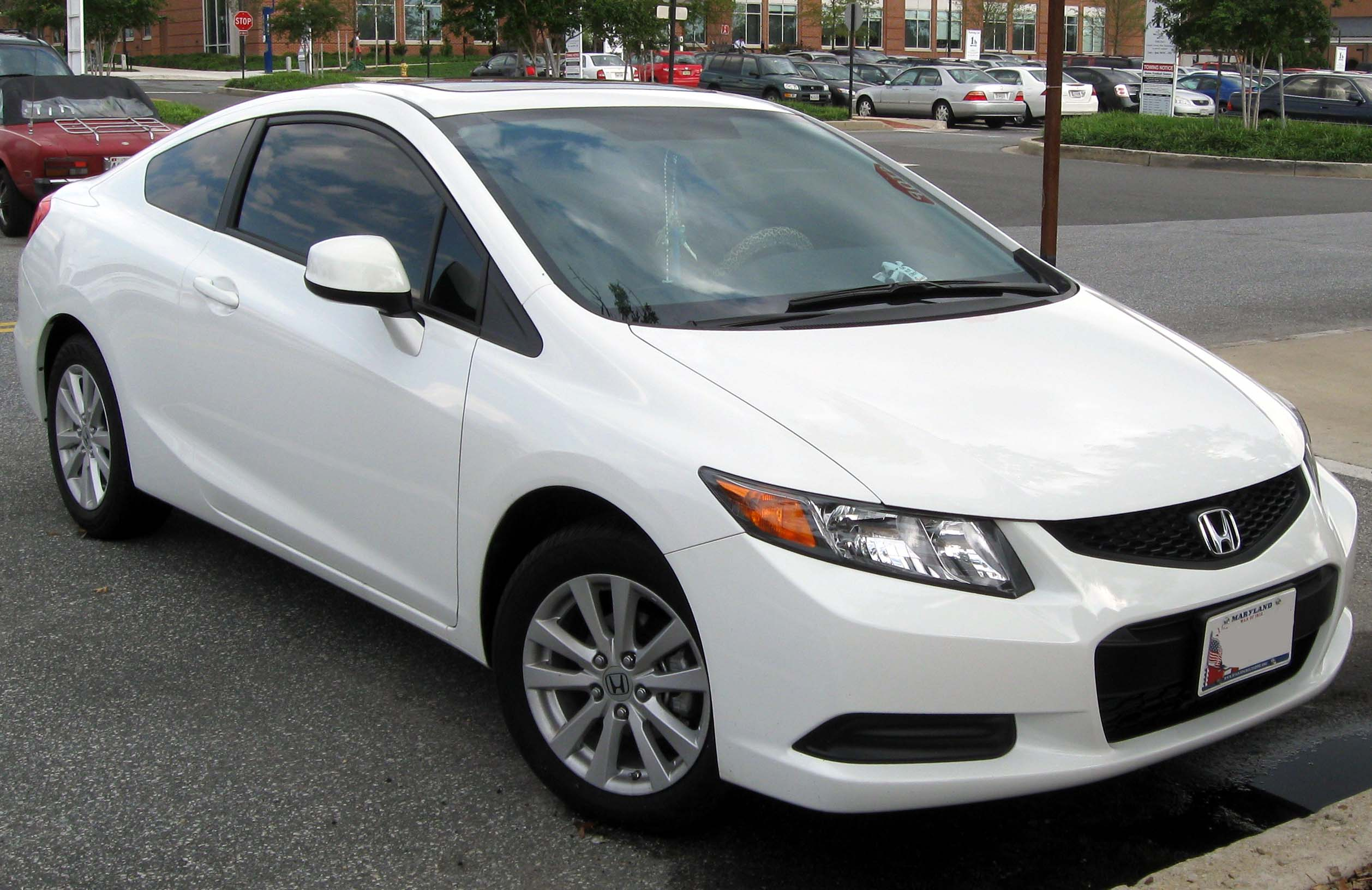
Pre-facelift

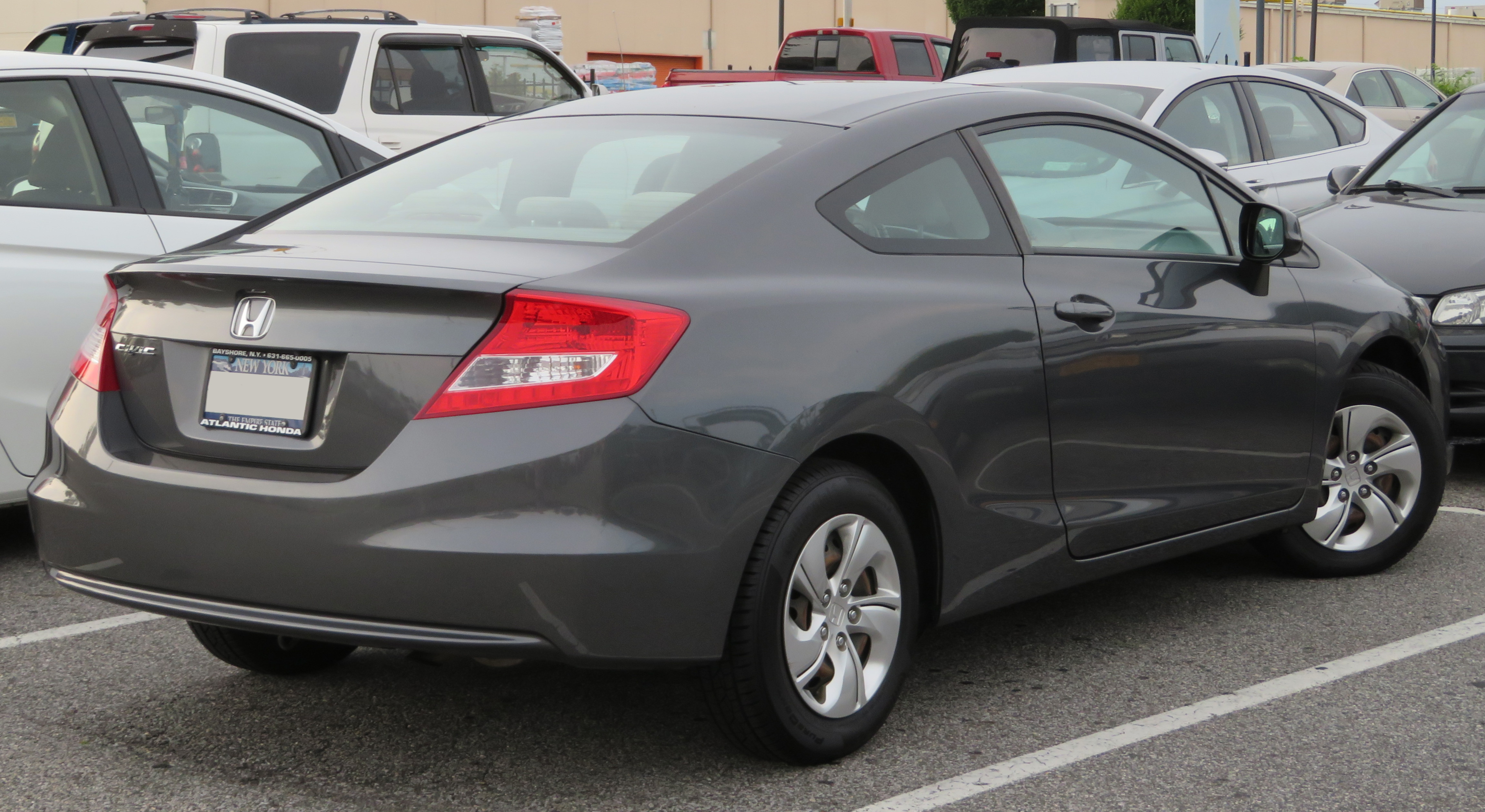
Pre-facelift

Petrol (DX, LX, EX and EX-L), hybrid and natural gas variants were offered. The non-hybrid petrol-engined lineup included a sedan and coupe, and Si (sport injected) performance versions were available as coupe and sedan.

Honda also released the Civic HF sedan, a model with aerodynamic and fuel efficiency enhancements which revived the "HF" moniker last used for the 1991 CRX HF. It featured a Honda R18 1.8 L inline-four engine and a 5-speed automatic transmission like the regular gas-powered models, but was tuned so that it returned 41 mpg_{‑US} (49.2 mpg_{‑imp}; 5.7 L/100 km; 17.4 km/L). It came with 15-inch alloy wheels with low rolling-resistance tires that reduce rolling resistance by 20%, additional underbody covers, a rear decklid spoiler and keyless entry with a security alarm. This resulted in a 4% improvement in aerodynamic performance. The Civic GX NGV (Natural Gas Vehicle) has been available since late 2011.

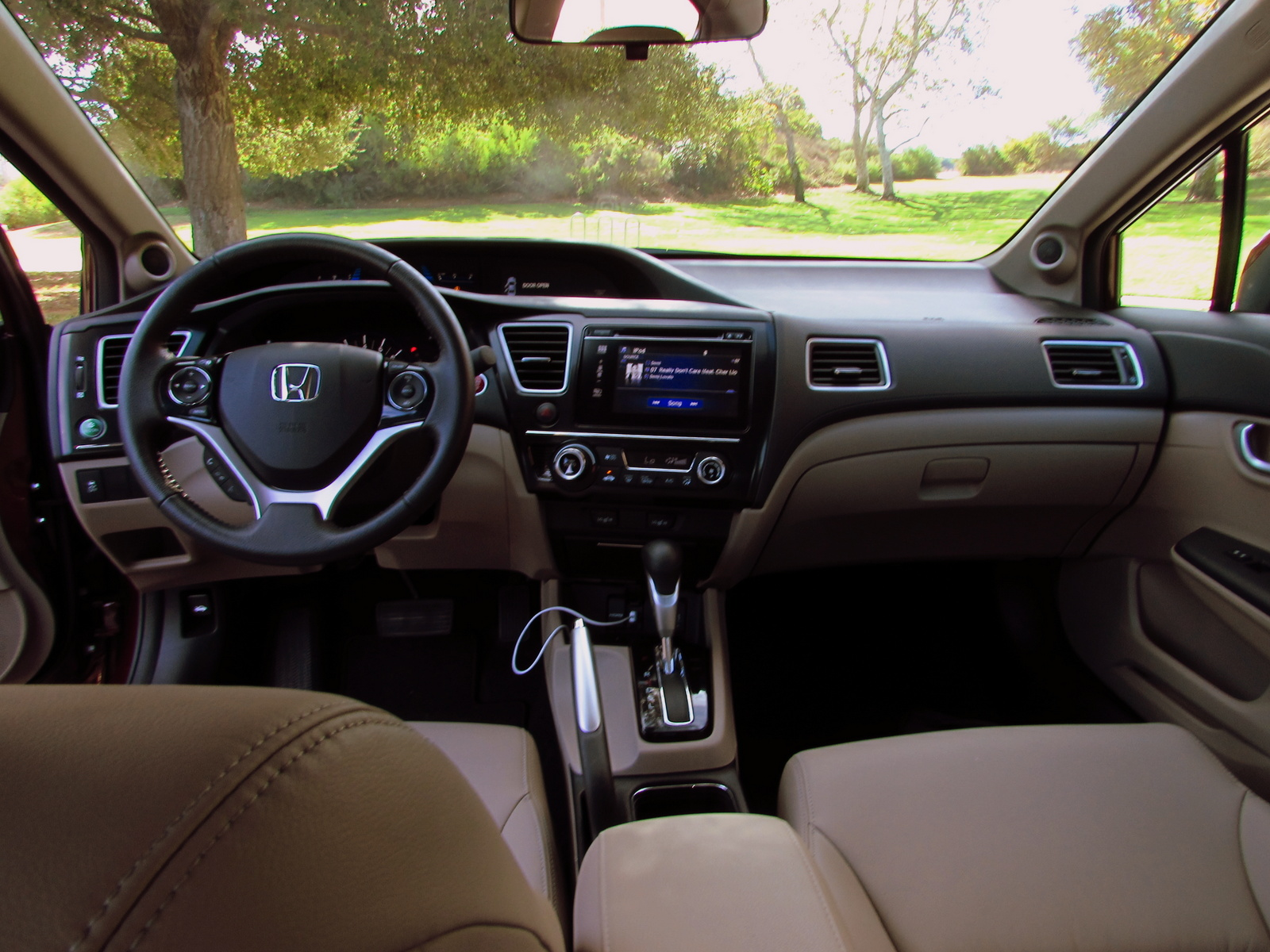
Interior (facelift)

The "two-tier" instrument panel from the previous generation saw a significant redesign. All models (except for the base model DX) come with an Intelligent Multi-Informational Display (iMID), situated on the enlarged upper tier and to the right of the digital speedometer. The 5-inch colour LCD screen replaces the trip computer below the analog tachometer on the lower tier while integrating information of the vehicle with that from compatible personal electronics and steering wheel controls. It displays information such as current odometer and trip mileage, time and date, fuel economy, audio system, climate control information, and more. The Maintenance Minder now includes interval reminders for scheduled maintenance, such as air filter, cabin pollen filter, tire rotations, drive belt inspections as well as an oil change reminder.

Honda's Eco Assist technology, introduced earlier on the Insight, is added to most models (except Si), and becomes the first petrol-only powered Honda to employ such technology in North America. It is an information system to help the driver adopt a more fuel-efficient driving style, and is proven to improve fuel economy by about 10% for Honda's hybrid vehicles in Japan by providing visual feedback to promote or confirm efficient driving.

All Civic models have better fuel economy in the U.S. EPA ratings, by as much as 8% on the highway for models with an automatic transmission compared to 2011 versions. Two versions achieve 41 mpg_{‑US} (5.7 L/100 km; 49 mpg_{‑imp}) (17.54 km/L) or above in U.S. government testing. Aerodynamics and weight reduction play important role in fuel economy improvement: aero parts are placed under the engine bay, fuel tank, and the rear underbody to enhance airflow; front spoiler and strakes ahead of tires direct airflow around the wheel wells; there is a new flat underfloor; resulting in 3.4% lower coefficient of drag. Increase use of high-strength steel to 55% on the sedan (56% for the coupe) from 50% contributes to a 7% reduction in body weight. The electric power steering system is lighter by 1.3 kg (2.9 lb); the front subframe is lighter by 1.7 kg (3.7 lb); a thinner-walled fuel tank saves 1.0 kg (2.2 lb) and a laser-welded exhaust silencer that is 0.5 kg (1.1 lb) lighter. As a result, the LX trim with an automatic transmission is almost 50 lb (23 kg) lighter. On the other hand, for the 2012 sedan, passenger volume is increased by 3.8 ft³ (108 L) to 94.7 ft³ (2682 L), with three more inches of elbowroom in the front and about two more inches of legroom in the back. The piston assembly was the source of the most significant losses in an engine. To reduce friction loss in the engine, pistons in the 1.8 litre engine have a molybdenum treatment applied in a polka-dot pattern.

A HF model, the most fuel-efficient petrol-only powered Civic in the lineup, gets 41 mpg_{‑US} (5.7 L/100 km; 49 mpg_{‑imp}) (17.54 km/L) under EPA highway test cycle, compares with 36 mpg_{‑US} (6.5 L/100 km; 43 mpg_{‑imp}) (15.38 km/L) for previous generation, increasing the combined fuel economy rating to 33 mpg_{‑US} (7.1 L/100 km; 40 mpg_{‑imp}) (14.08 km/L).

The Civic hybrid, with a larger 1.5-litre i-VTEC engine that produces 90 hp and 97 lb ft of torque and a lithium-ion battery, is rated at 44 mpg_{‑US} (5.3 L/100 km; 53 mpg_{‑imp}) in combined city and highway EPA test cycle, an improvement of 3 mpg_{‑US} (3.6 mpg_{‑imp}) over the previous generation hybrid. A new stronger electric motor produces 23 hp and 78 lb ft of torque. The new lithium-ion battery is lighter and more powerful compared with the nickel-metal hydride one in previous model. Both the Civic HF and Civic Hybrid models have improved aerodynamics.

Other petrol-only powered Civic sedans and coupes get 39 mpg_{‑US} (6.0 L/100 km; 47 mpg_{‑imp}) in highway tests, an improvement of 3 mpg_{‑US} (3.6 mpg_{‑imp}) over previous generation, and 28 mpg_{‑US} (8.4 L/100 km; 34 mpg_{‑imp}) for city driving. The Civic GX natural gas model will have a 7% improvement in fuel economy. The above models are also equipped with the Honda ECO Assist technology.

==== Si ====
The ninth-generation Civic Si was available as a coupe and as a sedan. It is powered by a new 2.4-litre K-Series (K24Z7) inline-four engine which has increased displacement through longer piston stroke than the K20Z3 from the eighth generation Civic Si, yet the K24Z7 retains the 11.0:1 compression used in the K20Z3. It produces 201 hp (150 kW) and 170 lb⋅ft (230 N⋅m) of torque. Honda retuned the exhaust system in early 2014, increasing the output to 205 hp (153 kW) and 174 lb⋅ft (236 N⋅m) of torque.

The redline of the K24Z7 is 7,000 rpm with a fuel cut at 7,200 rpm. A 6-speed manual transmission with a helical LSD (Limited Slip Differential) was offered as the only available transmission option for the Civic Si. The wing spoilers are different from the 8th generation, and the interior of the car received slight updates with the addition of a rev limit indicator and a power meter displayed in the new i-MID (intelligent Multi-Information Display). Sway bars have been changed to F18mm/R15mm from the F28mm/R17mm in eighth generation. The chassis is also more rigid, and the curb weight is slightly lower than the eighth generation. The Civic Si achieves an EPA-estimated highway fuel economy of 31 mpg_{‑US} (7.6 L/100 km; 37 mpg_{‑imp}), an increase of 2 mpg_{‑US} (2.4 mpg_{‑imp}).

In 2012, Honda recalled 50,000 2012 Civics because the process required during assembly to seat the driver's side driveshaft and set the retaining clip was not completed.

=== Other markets ===
Chinese models went on sale on 29 October 2011. Early models include a choice of two engines: 1.8-litre and 2.0-litre; 5-speed manual (1.8 EXi), 5-speed automatic (1.8 EXi, 1.8 VTi) or 5-speed tiptronic transmission (2.0 Type-S) and navigation system for 1.8 VTi and 2.0 Type-S.

Starting from September 2015, models for the Turkish market were available with factory converted LPG version with the commencement of a new LPG-only assembly line in Honda's Turkey plant. Turkish models had been available with dealer-installed LPG conversion since 2011.

In Pakistan, Honda Atlas launched the ninth generation Civic in mid-September 2012 for the 2013 model year.

In the Philippines, the ninth generation Civic was initially launched in early 2012 and was initially launched in one sole variant, 1.8 EXi, paired to a 5 Speed Automatic. Due to the Thailand floods, both the Honda CR-V of the same year and the Honda Civic were being imported from Honda's Assembly Plant in Saitama and Suzuka, respectively. A little later, production moved to the Thailand plant, giving the Philippines the full lineup. Consisting of 1.8 S MT/AT, 1.8 E AT, 1.8 EXi AT, 2.0 EL AT. By 2014, HCPI updated the Civic, dropping the EXi, as well as the MT options, and giving the E a Modulo bodykit while the EL gets a Mugen kit, leaving the 1.8 S as the sole trim level with no special bodykit. All AT models are paired to a 5 Speed Automatic, and depending on the year model and trim level, have paddle shifters on the steering wheel. The only MT model was paired to a 5 Speed Manual transmission.

=== Facelift ===
==== North America ====
===== 2013 model year =====
Reviews of the 2012 Civic were generally lackluster, with many reviewers citing as drawbacks the car's cheap interior materials, along with worsened driving dynamics and insubstantial exterior styling changes from the previous generation. Consumer Reports went so far as to remove the 2012 Civic from its 'Recommended' list of compact cars, which the vehicle had been on for many years. In addition to Consumer Reviews, Edmunds reported issues with excessive wind noise, cheap interior plastics, and a small trunk.

In response to the criticisms, Honda quickly introduced a heavily revamped Civic for the next model year, promising improved styling, driving dynamics, interior quality, standard features, sound insulation, and ride quality. The refreshed 2013 Civic sedan featured a new front fascia with a U-shaped honeycomb grille and chrome accents (replacing the 2012 model's three-bar grille), a redesigned hood and a reworked rear end with new taillight lenses, along with additional light clusters and a chrome bar on the trunk lid. The long-standing base DX trim got discontinued. In Canada, the EX-L sedan was replaced by the similarly equipped Touring, with the main difference being new 17-inch wheels adopted from the previous generation Si, while the EX-L coupe also received the same 17-inch wheels as the Touring. New standard features included a rear backup camera, Bluetooth controls and Pandora Radio access. Ride quality, handling and interior material quality were also improved. The coupe retained the 2012 model exterior styling, but received the same interior and engineering upgrades as the sedan.

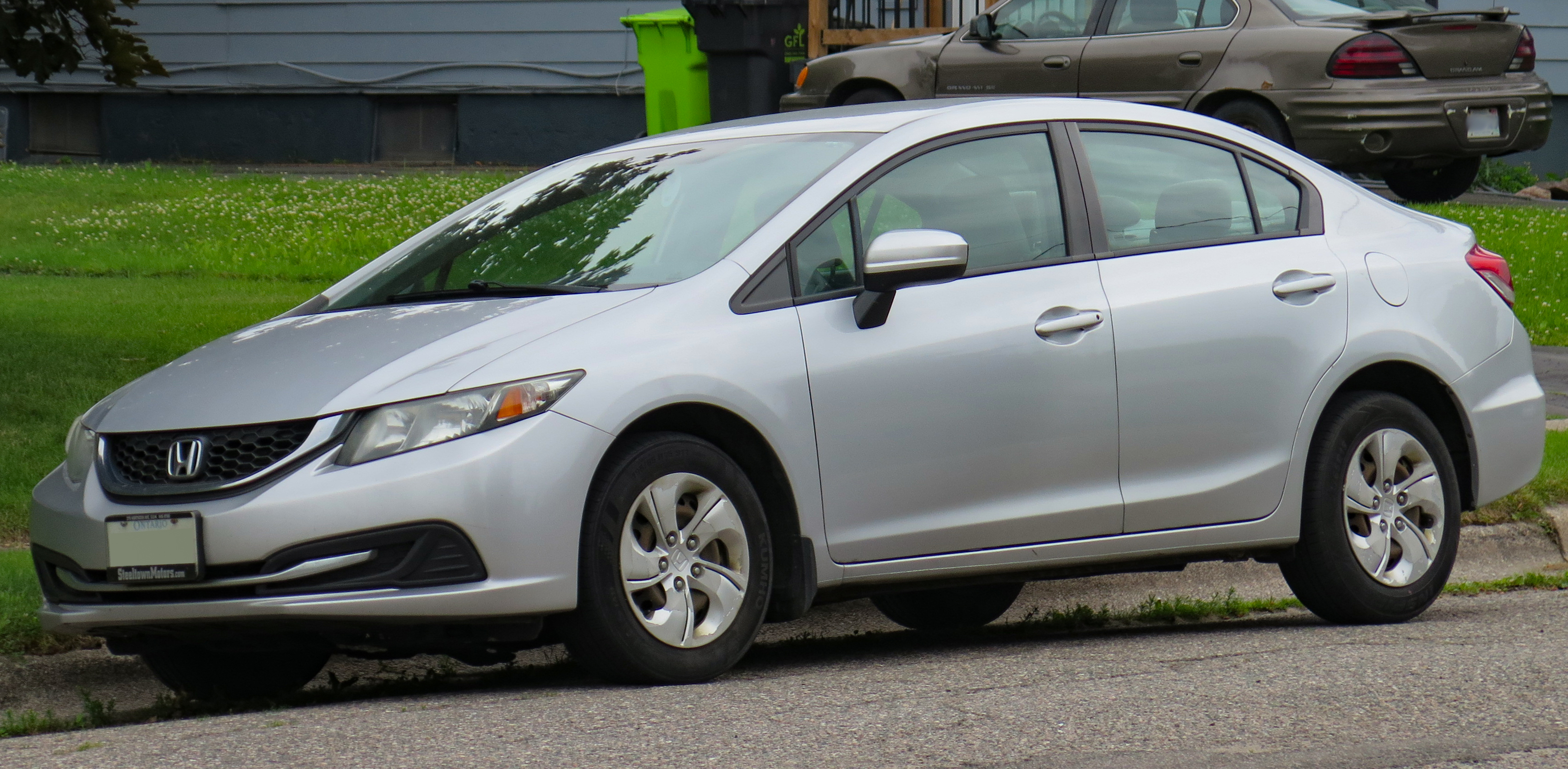
2015 Honda Civic LX sedan (Canada; facelift)

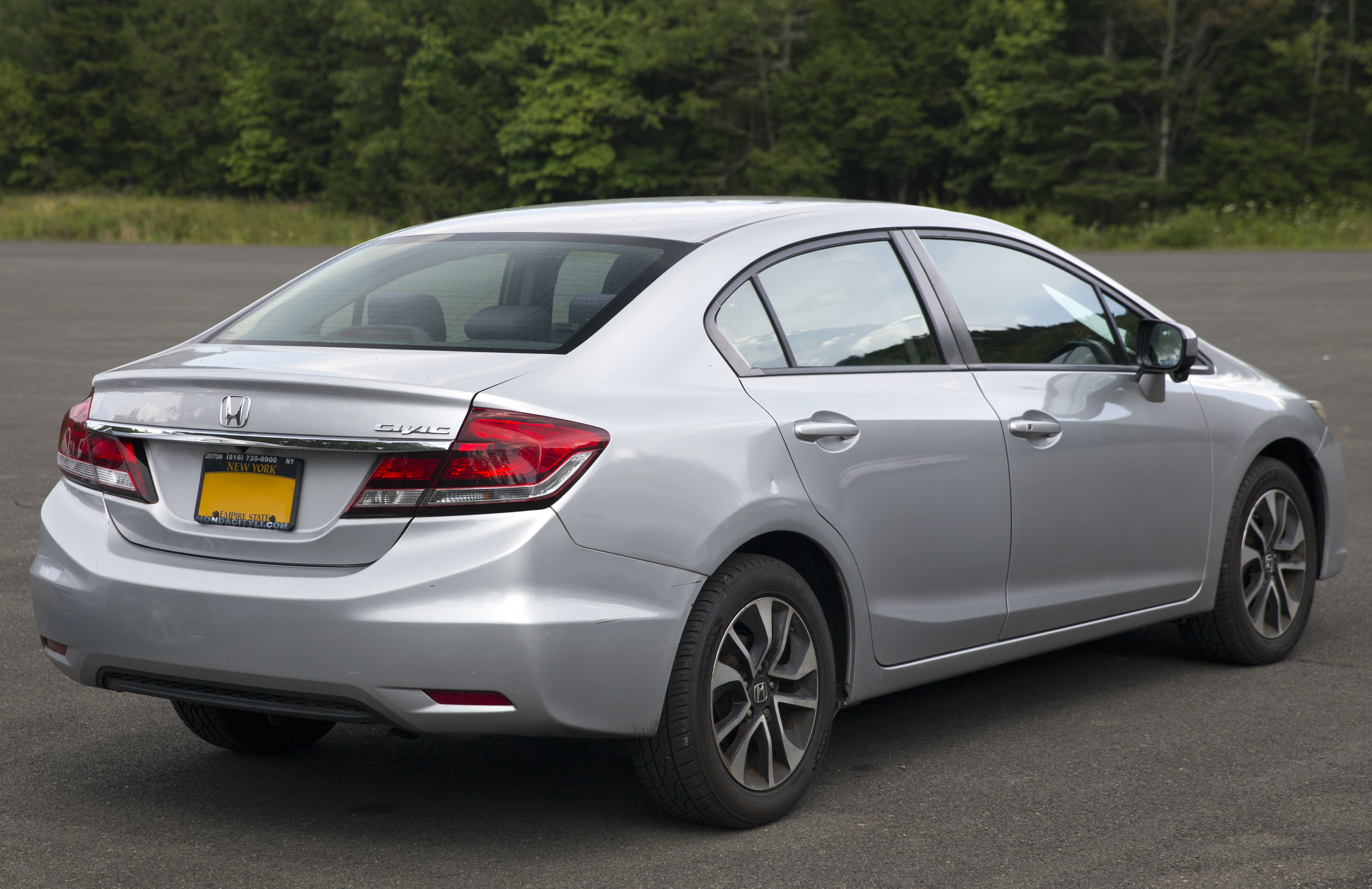
Rear view (EX, facelift)

===== 2014 model year =====
For 2014, minor changes were made to the Civic lineup in North America. These changes included exterior styling updates on the Civic coupe, premium interior refinements to all models, an optional audio system with a 7-inch capacitive touchscreen, LaneWatch blind spot monitor (consisting of a camera mounted on the passenger-side mirror), "Smart Entry" with push button start, HondaLink connected-car technology and an all-new CVT for petrol-powered Civics. Hill start assist may have also been added with the 2014 models.

U.S. models included the Civic LX and EX coupes with a 5-speed manual transmission or CVT, EX-L and EX-L Navi coupes with a CVT; Civic LX sedan with a 5-speed manual or CVT, EX, EX-L, EX-L Navi and HF sedans with a CVT. In Canada, the EX-L sedan continued to be absent with the Touring in its place. Styling changes to the Civic coupe included a restyled grille, hood, front fenders and headlights, new taillight lenses, sportier front and rear bumpers, new side mirrors and a new selection of wheel styles. The Civic Si coupe included a unique lower front bumper garnish, larger rear decklid spoiler, a front spoiler and rear air diffuser; in addition they also received an increase in engine power to 205 hp (153 kW) and 174 lb-ft of torque via a retuned exhaust system. U.S. EX-L models received the same 17-inch wheels that debuted the previous model year on Canadian Touring sedans and EX-L coupes. The EX-L coupe with accessories kit featured a ground effects package and 18-inch diamond-cut alloy wheels.

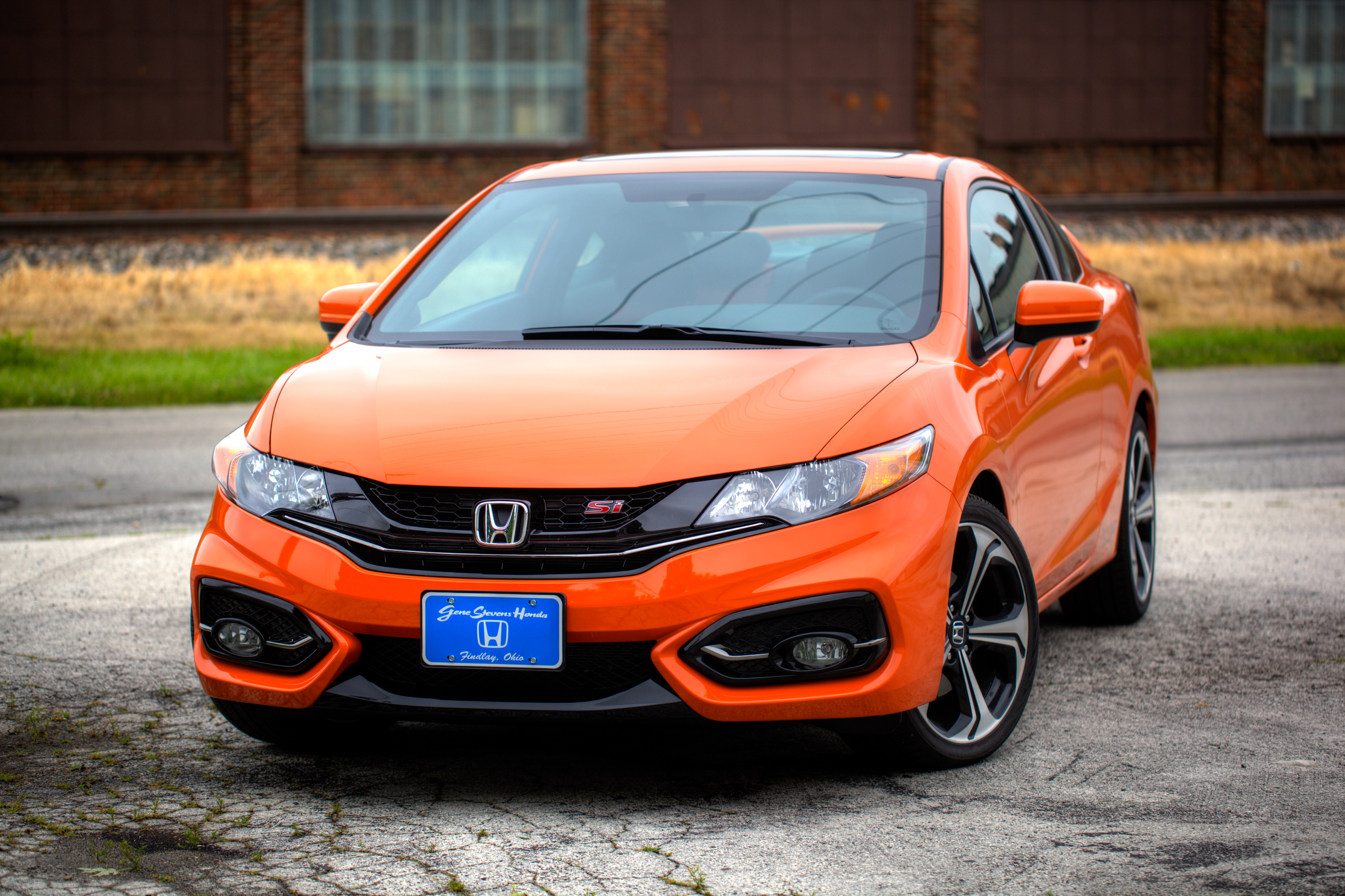
2015 Honda Civic Si coupe (US; facelift)

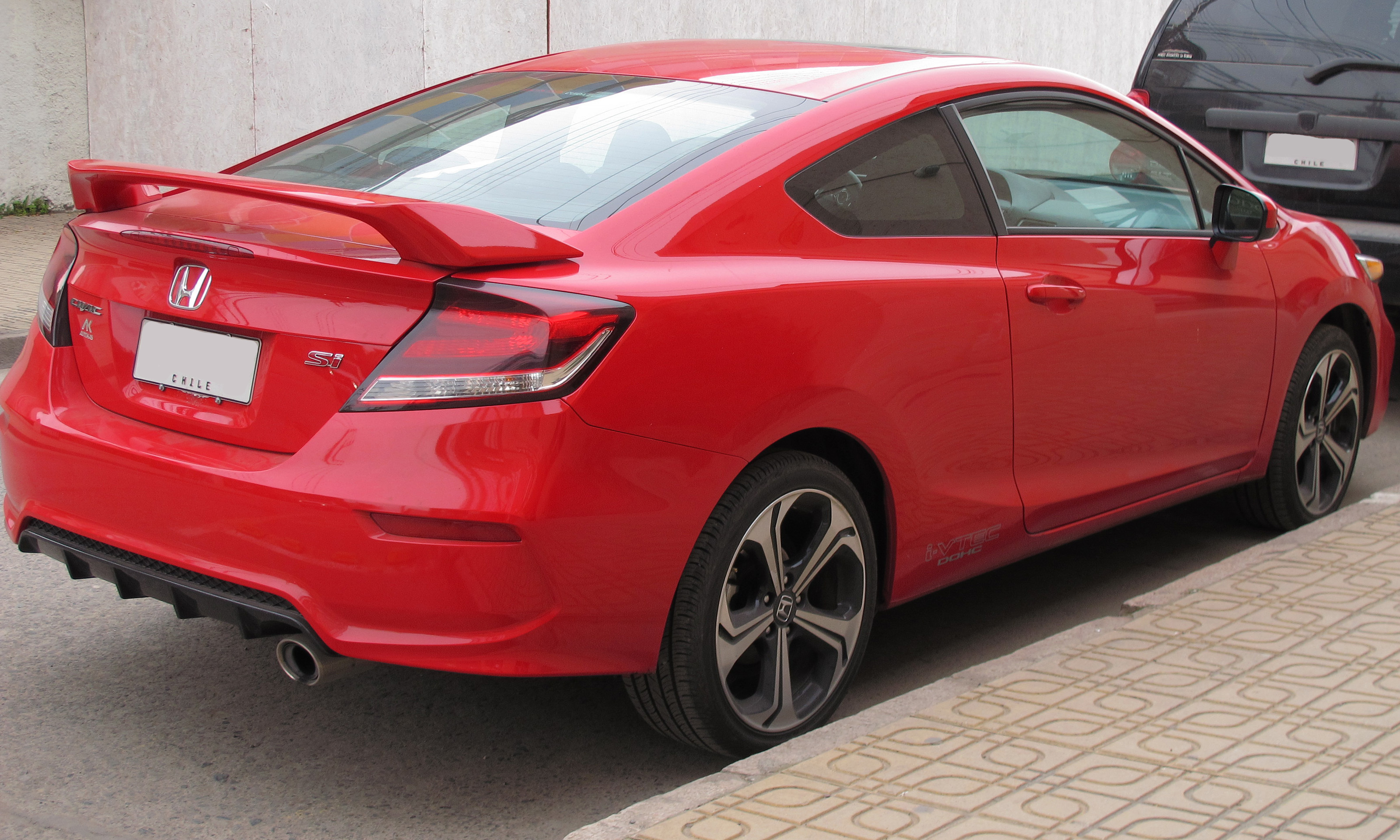
2014 Honda Civic Si coupe (Chile; facelift)

==== Other markets ====
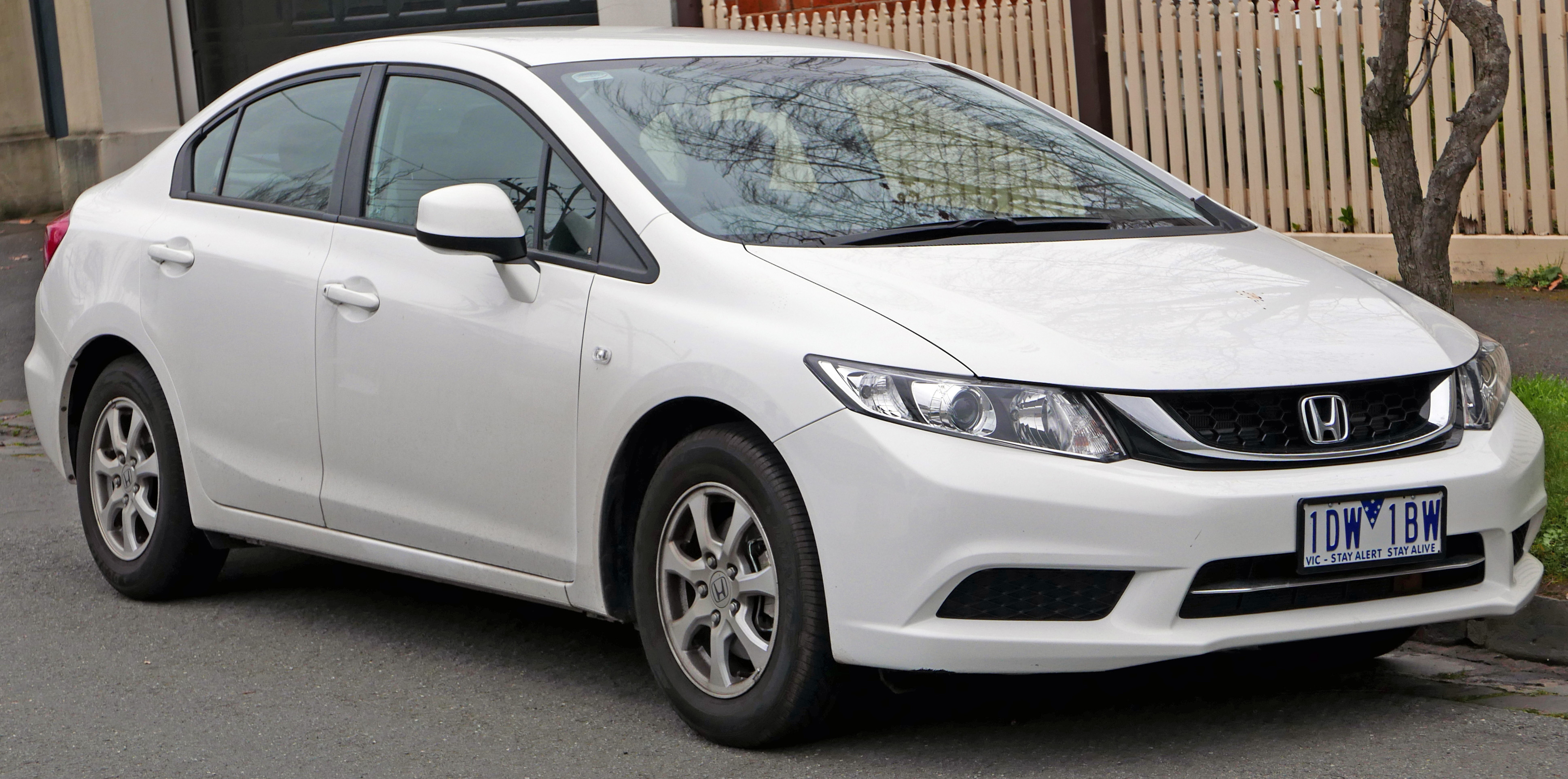
2014 Honda Civic VTi sedan (Australia; facelift)

For Southeast Asian and Australian markets, the facelifted model of the ninth-generation Civic sedan was unveiled in 2014. Changes include redesigned front grille and wheel design, while the rear taillight has remained the same as the pre-facelift model. The right-hand drive Civic Hybrid variant has never had a facelift.

=== Hybrid ===
The hybrid version of the ninth-generation Civic sedan is the third iteration of the Civic Hybrid. It was launched during 2011 in the U.S. and Canada as a 2012 model. It has a larger 1.5-litre i-VTEC engine that produces 90 horsepower and 97 lb⋅ft of torque and a lithium-ion battery pack instead of nickel-metal hydride. The larger engine replaces the 1.3-L engine for better mid-range torque. The DC brushless permanent magnet motor, which is placed between the engine and continuously variable transmission, provides 23 hp (17 kW) and 78 lb⋅ft of torque and weighs 0.7 kg (1.5 lb) less. The 2012 Civic Hybrid has an EPA rating of 44 mpg_{‑US} (5.3 L/100 km; 53 mpg_{‑imp}) for the city and highway driving cycles, an improvement from 40 mpg_{‑US} (5.9 L/100 km; 48 mpg_{‑imp}) city and 43 mpg_{‑US} (5.5 L/100 km; 52 mpg_{‑imp}) highway for the previous generation.

The Civic Hybrid has the latest Integrated Motor Assist (IMA) parallel hybrid system, with a new 20 kW motor – powered by lithium, a first for a Honda hybrid vehicle. The new battery is 5 kW more powerful, 9 kg (20 lb) lighter and takes up 36% less space. Battery capacity is increased from 35 kAh to 100 kAh (4.5 Ah).

It comes with improved aerodynamics and Honda ECO Assist technology. The ECO Assist technology is an information system to help the driver adopt a more fuel-efficient driving style, and is proven to improve fuel economy by about 10% for Honda's hybrid vehicles in Japan.

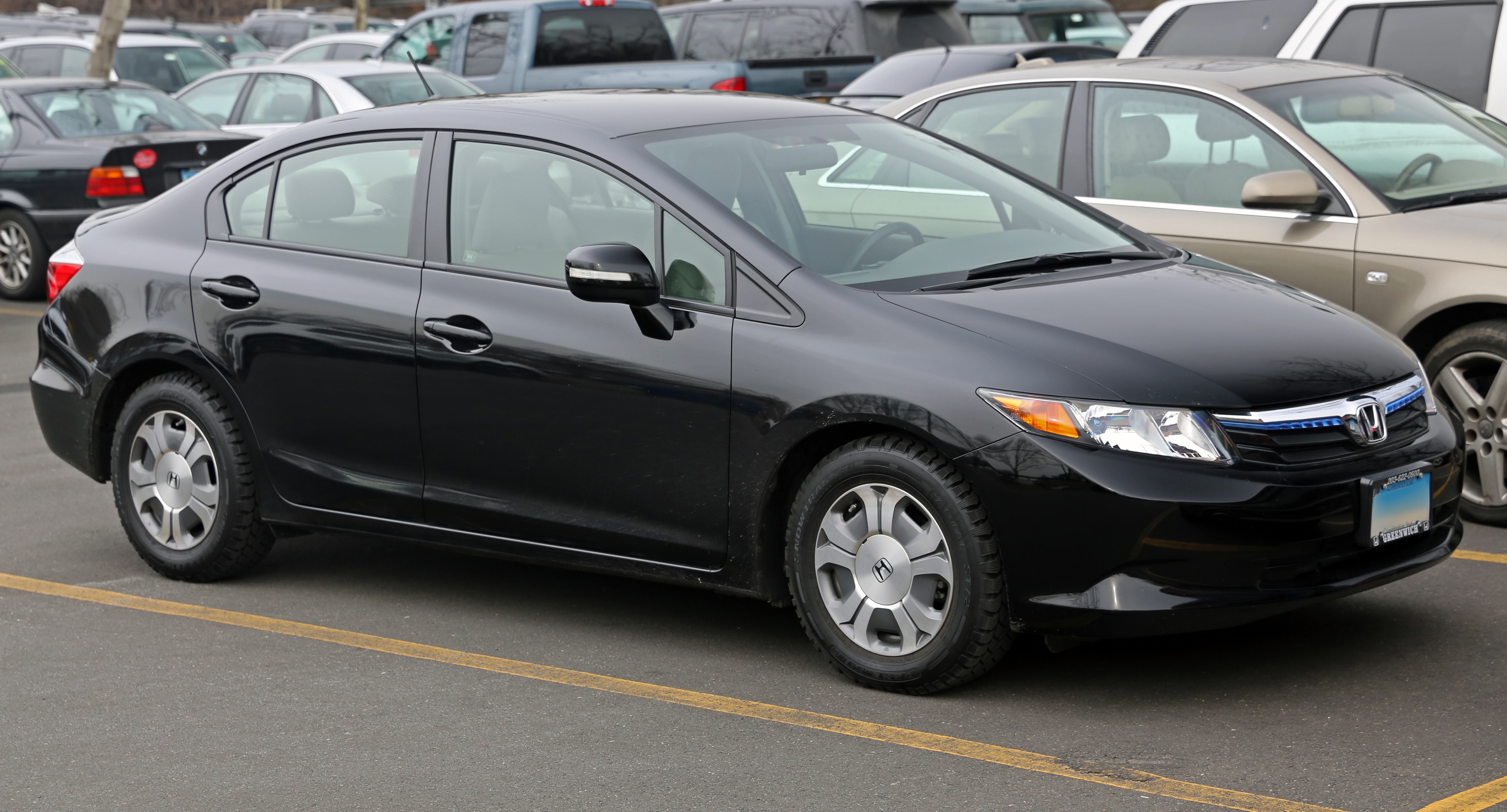
2012 Honda Civic Hybrid sedan (US; pre-facelift)

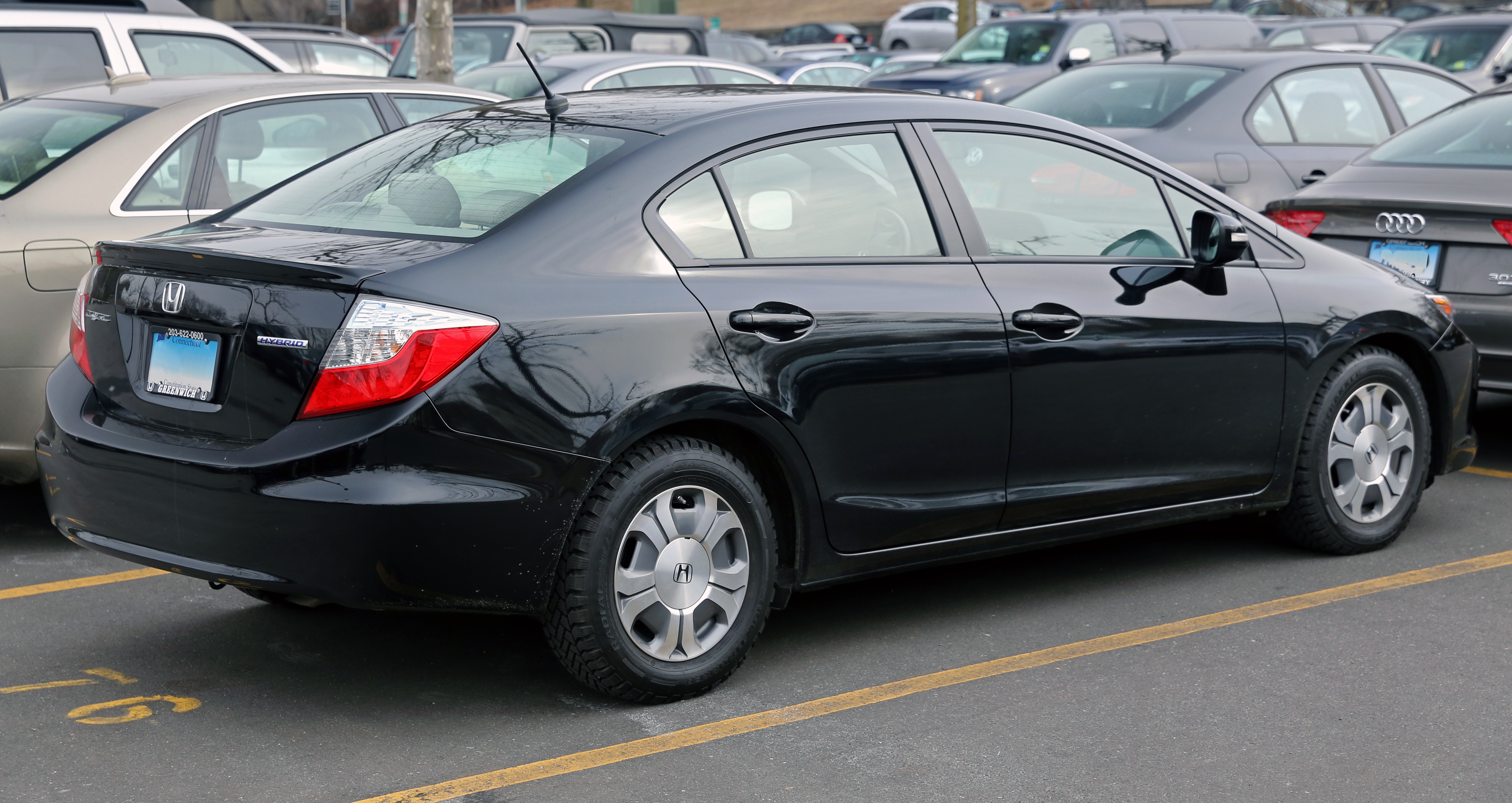
2012 Honda Civic Hybrid sedan (US; pre-facelift)

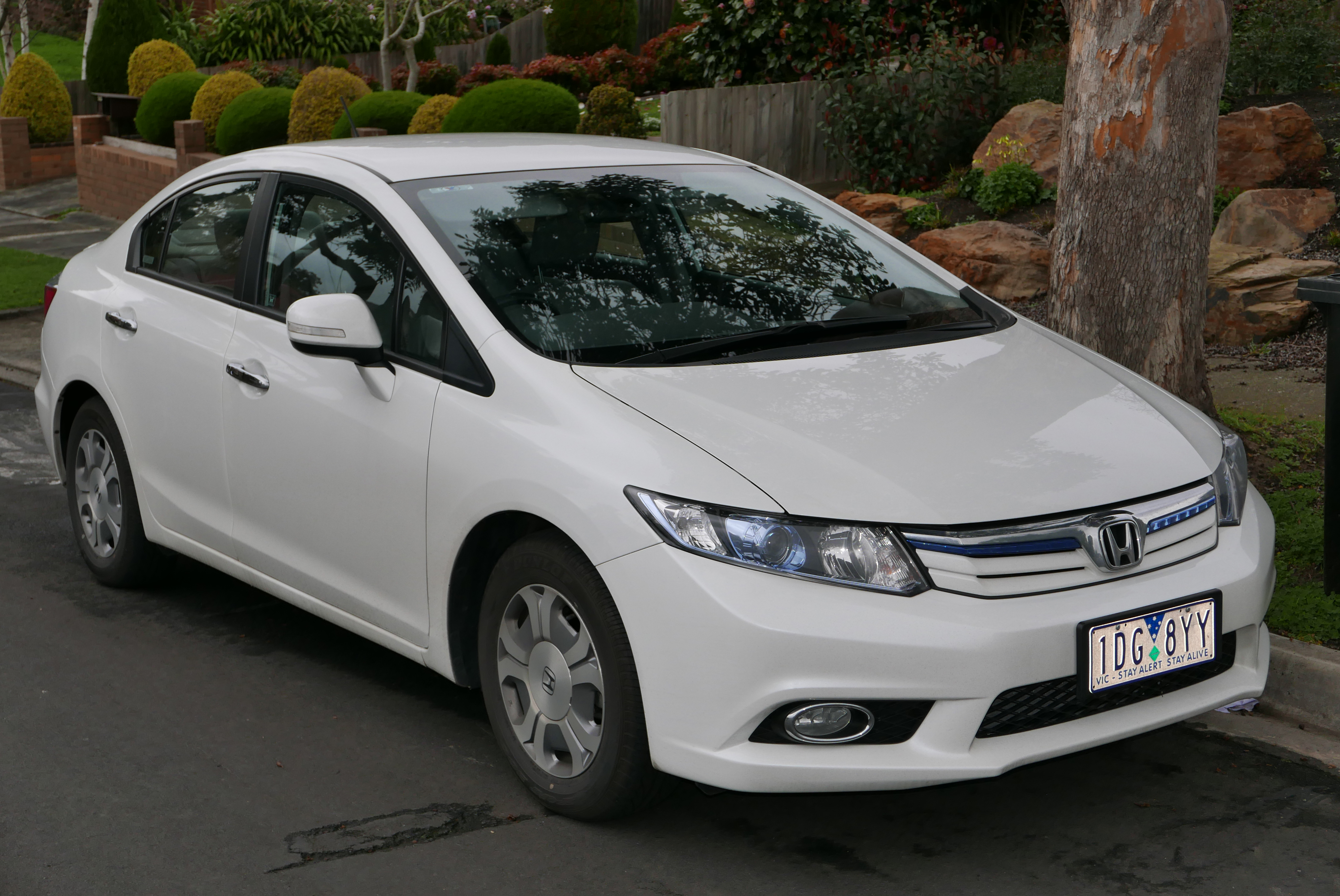
2013 Honda Civic Hybrid sedan (Australia)

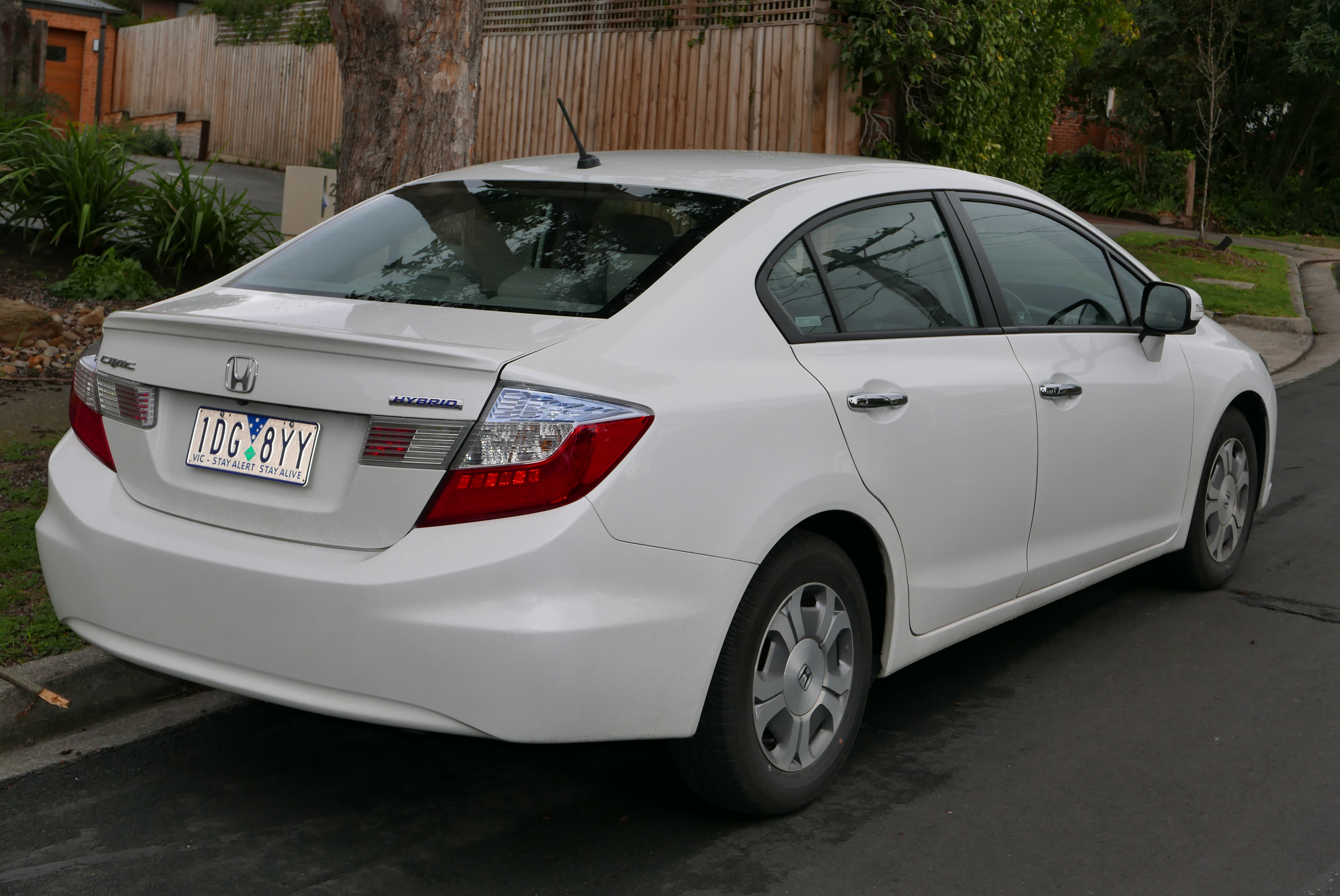
2013 Honda Civic Hybrid sedan (Australia)

==== Production ====
Production of the Civic Hybrid sedan was moved from Suzuka, Japan to Greensburg, Indiana, United States in early 2013, following the production of the Acura ILX hybrid commenced at Indiana plant in April 2012, after production capacity was expanded to 250,000.

=== Safety ===
To improve safety, Honda used an updated ACE II body structure on 2013 Civics. Beginning with 2013 models, all Civics came standard with a rear-view backup camera.

IIHS sedan scores:
Moderate overlap frontal offset	Good
Small overlap frontal offset*	Good (2013–15)
Side impact	Good
Roof strength	Good

IIHS coupe scores
Moderate overlap frontal offset	Good (2013–15)
Small overlap frontal offset*	Good (2013–15)
Side impact	Good (2013–15)
Roof strength	Good (2013–15)

^{*} first vehicle in the small car category rated "Good" in the IIHS small overlap crash test

ANCAP test results* Honda Civic all petrol sedan variants (2012)
Test	Score
Overall	5 /5 stars
Frontal offset	13.91/16
Side impact	16/16
Pole	2/2
Seat belt reminders	3/3
Whiplash protection	Good
Pedestrian protection	Good
Electronic stability control	Standard

ASEAN NCAP test results Honda Civic (2013)
Test	Points	Stars
Adult occupant:	14.63	5 /5 stars
Child occupant:	82%	0 /5 stars
Safety assist:	NA	

== Hatchback/Tourer (FK1–3; 2011) ==
Civic hatchback/Tourer
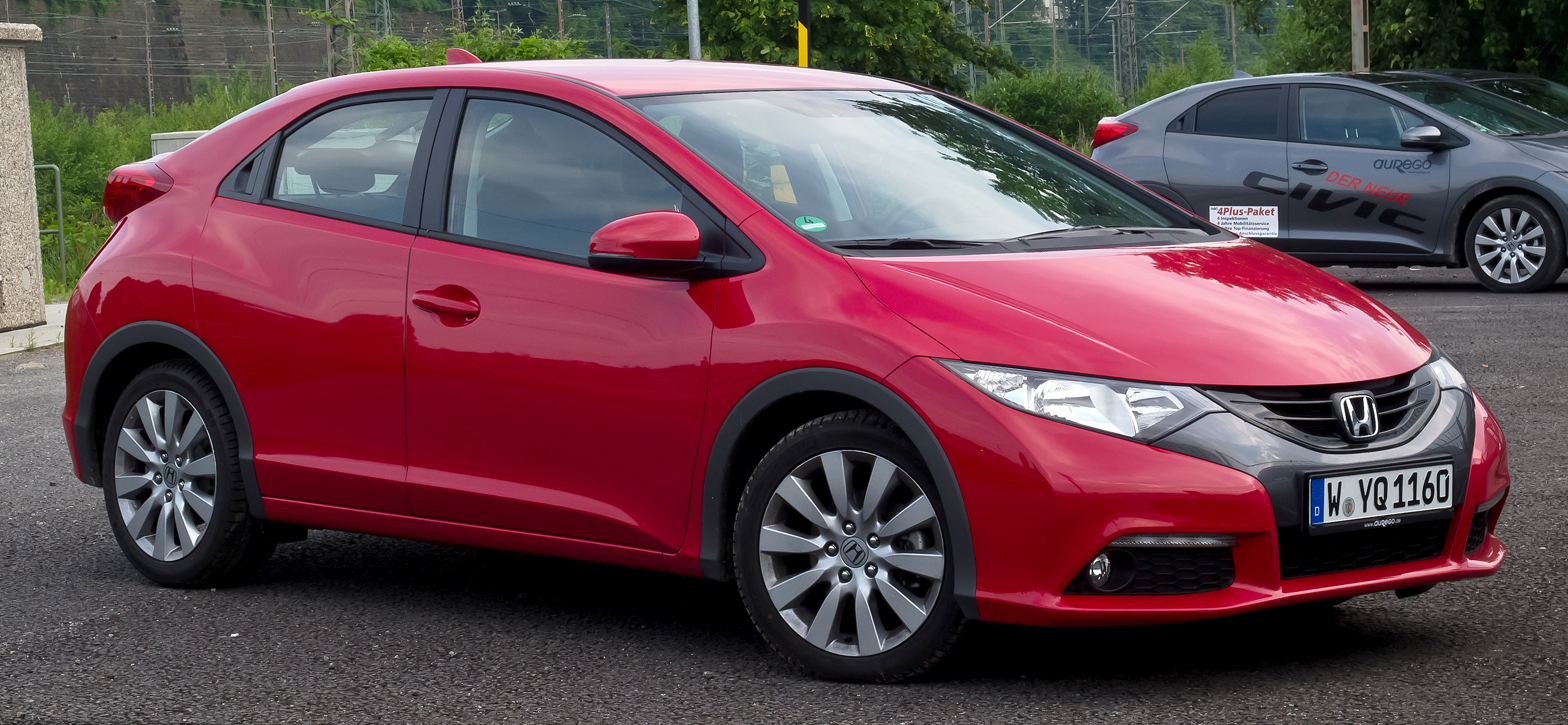
- 2012 Civic hatchback (Europe; pre-facelift)

Overview
- Model code: FK1; FK2 (hatchback); FK3 (station wagon)
- Production: 2011–2017 (hatchback); December 2013 – January 2017 (Tourer)
- Assembly: United Kingdom: Swindon (HUM)
- Designer: Daisuke Toriyama and Masashi Nakai

Body and chassis
- Body style: 5-door hatchback 5-door station wagon/estate

Powertrain
- Engine: Petrol: 1.4 L L13Z1 I4; 1.8 L R18Z4 I4; 2.0 L K20C1 I4 turbo (Type R); Diesel: 1.6 L N16 I4 turbo; 2.2 L N22B I4 turbo
- Transmission: 6-speed manual 5-speed automatic 6-speed automatic

Dimensions
- Wheelbase: 2,596 mm (102.2 in)
- Length: 4,300–4,369 mm (169.3–172.0 in) (hatchback); 4,521–4,590 mm (178.0–180.7 in) (Tourer)
- Width: 1,770 mm (69.7 in)
- Height: 1,471–1,590 mm (57.9–62.6 in) (hatchback); 1,440 mm (56.7 in) (Tourer)
- Curb weight: 1,251–1,378 kg (2,758–3,038 lb) (hatchback); 1,280–1,337 kg (2,822–2,948 lb) (Tourer)

The European-market, five-door hatchback Civic was unveiled at the Frankfurt Motor Show in September 2011. Strong identity of the previous generation European Civic led Honda to refine the current package instead of radical changes. Basic look and proportions of previous car are retained as the futuristic design was welcomed by customers. Aerodynamics, rear and side visibility were improved. It was claimed to be the most aerodynamic car in its class, with a coefficient of drag of 0.27. The wheelbase is 30 mm (1.2 in) shorter without a decrease of interior space. Retaining the compact torsion beam rear suspension and the centrally mounted fuel tank help contribute to a boot capacity of 470 litres. The rear beam axle is completely redesigned for higher stiffness, and new fluid-filled bushing is used to improve stability and cornering ability, as well as ride quality. More than 20,000 miles of testing was carried out on British roads to ensure better handling and ride quality. There are more standard equipment and higher interior quality.

UK models went on sale on 1 October 2011. Early models include a choice of 1.4-litre petrol, 1.8-litre petrol, 2.2-litre i-DTEC Diesel engines, with 1.6-litre diesel engine available later in 2012.

The hatchback model was also sold in Australasia as the Civic Hatchback from June 2012, offering a single engine option of a 1.8-litre petrol.

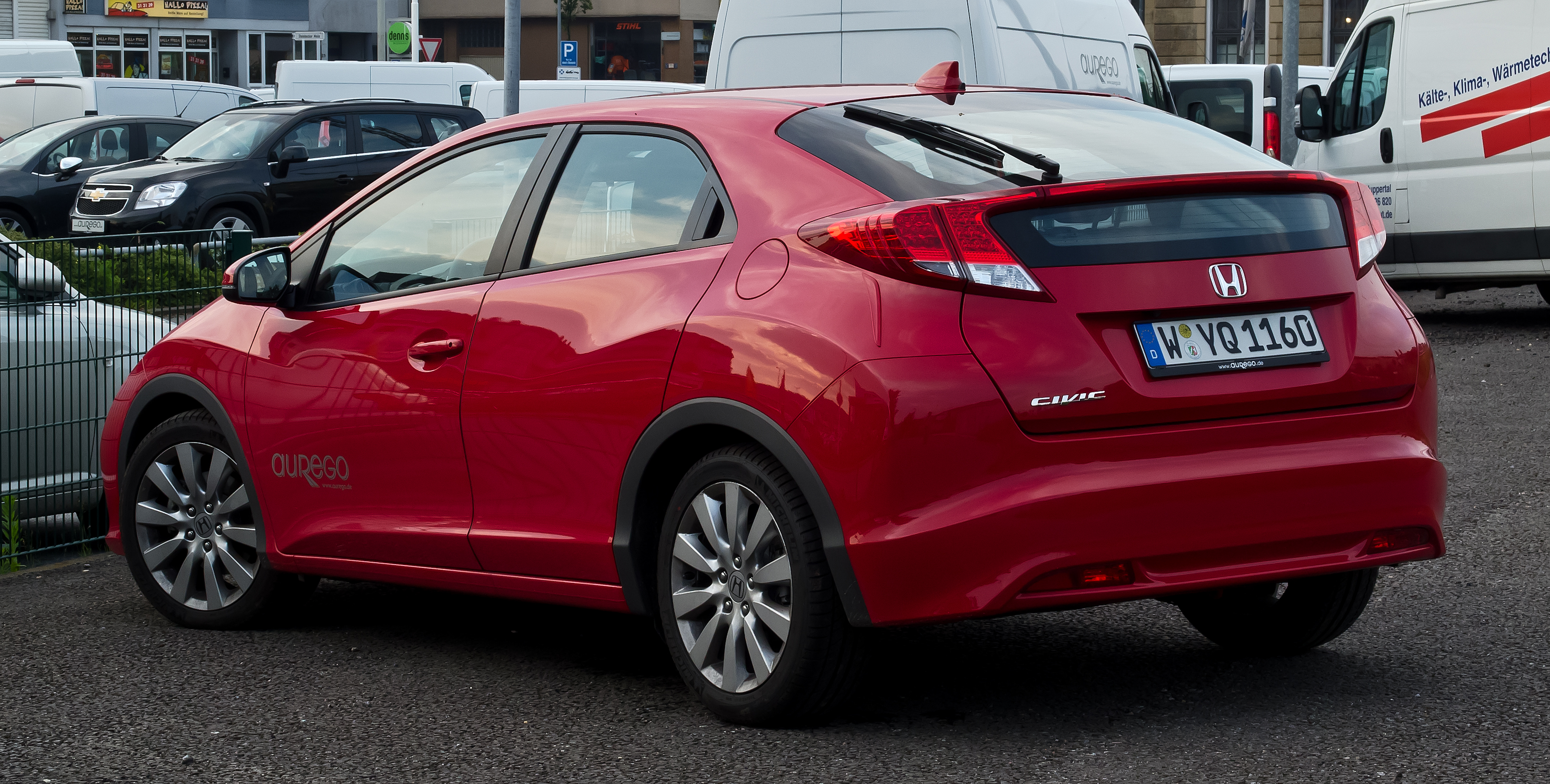
Rear view

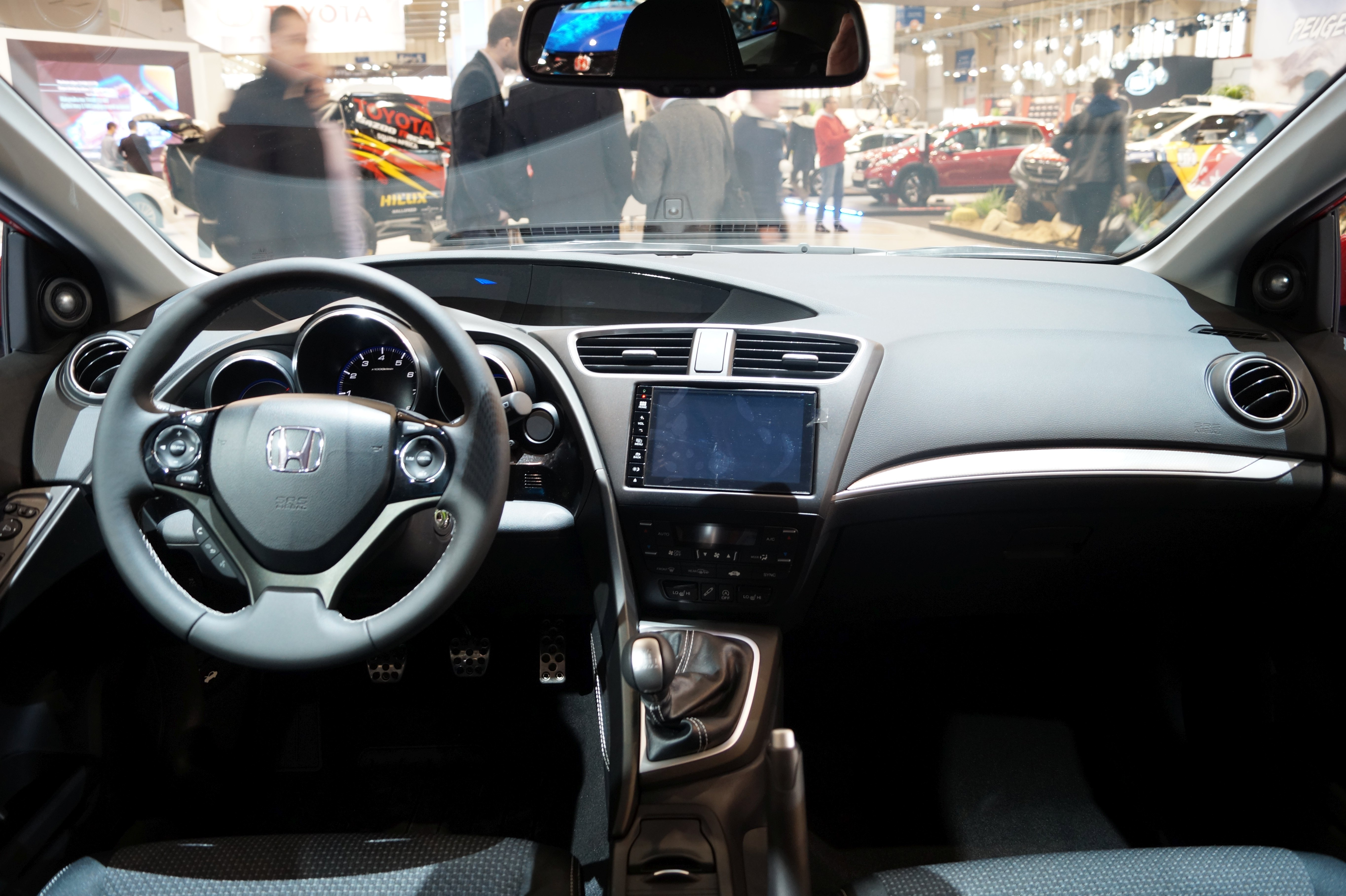
Interior

=== Development and production ===
As Honda's Research and Development Centre in Tochigi, Japan was damaged in the March 2011 earthquake, designers of the European Civic were transferred to the Swindon plant in the UK, where all European Civic hatchbacks are built, to ensure the development is not delayed. Production at Swindon, UK, was disrupted by supply chain disruption caused by the 2011 Japanese tsunami and flooding in Thailand. Normal production of Civic did not start until December 2011, causing the new Civic to not be available on the market until February 2012.

Production of Civic 5-door hatchback began at Honda of the UK Manufacturing Limited by in November 2011. The 1.6 and 2.2 i-DTEC engines used in Civic were also built at the same plant. Later in 2014, the Civic Tourer was built alongside the Civic hatchback variant.

=== 2015 facelift ===
The facelifted Civic hatchback was unveiled at the 2014 Paris Motor Show and went on sale in March 2015. Changes to the Civic hatchback include retuned electric power steering to provide a more secure control during higher speeds, front and rear dampers were revised for improving body control, toe and camber of the rear suspension were realigned to improve the hatchback's handling, privacy glass on the lower rear window, piano black touches on the number plate surround, tailgate and lower bumper; piano black front bumper, new alloy wheels, darker wheel arch garnishes, white stitching on the seats, steering wheel and knee pad; aluminum inserts around the cup holder, glossy black inserts.

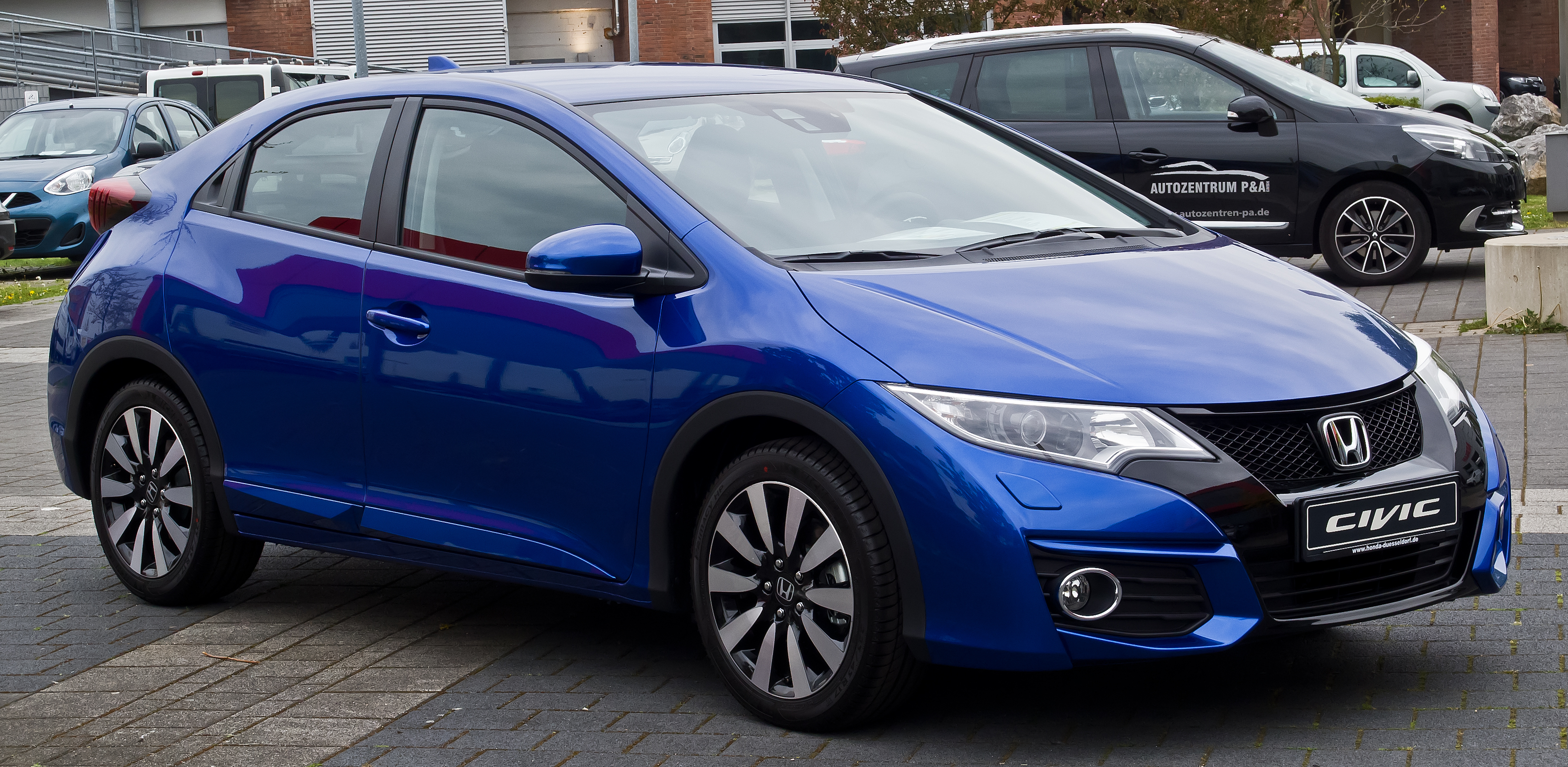
2015 Civic hatchback (facelift)

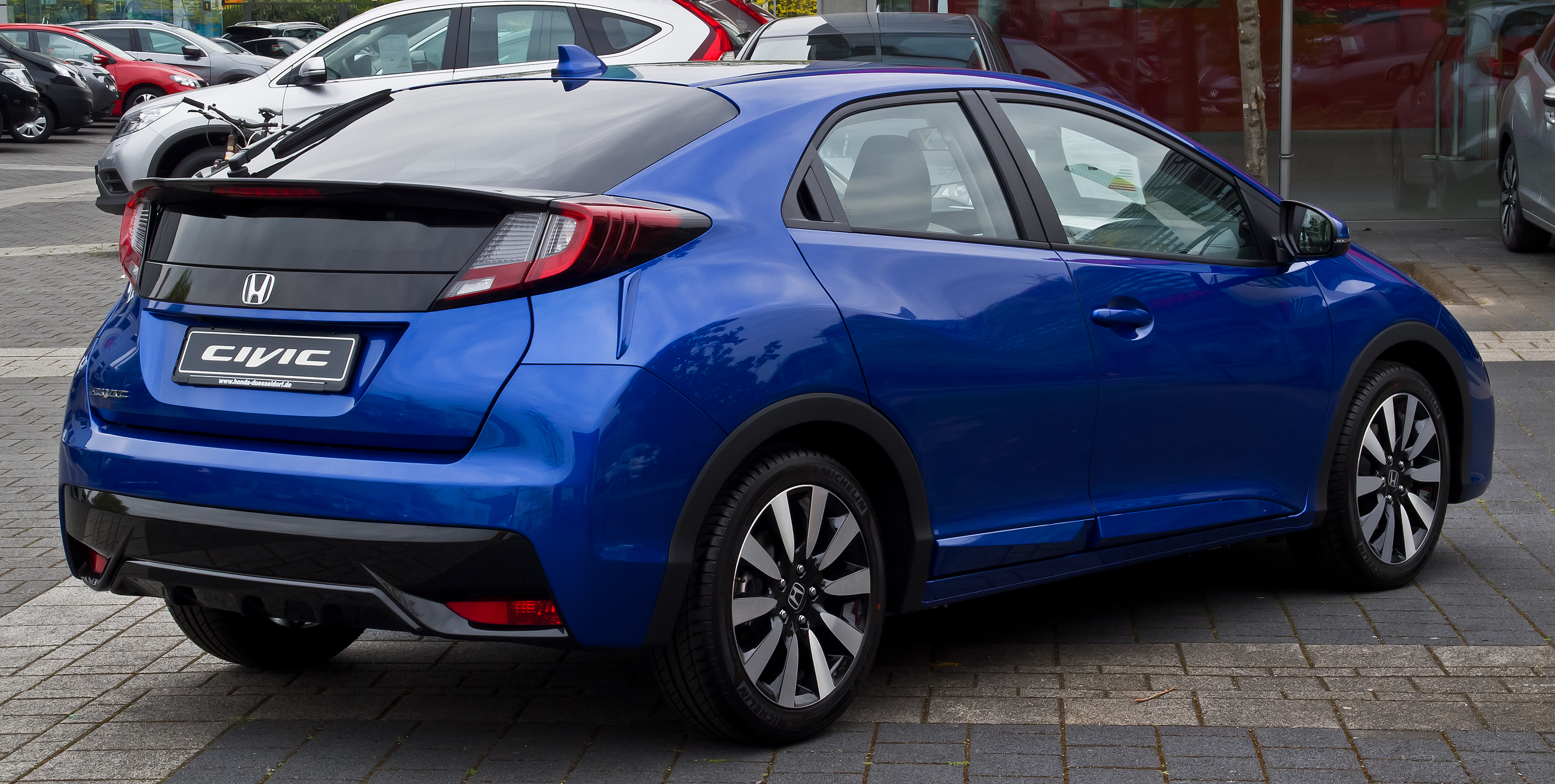
Rear view

=== Civic Tourer ===
The station wagon version of the European Civic was marketed as the Civic Tourer. It was unveiled as a concept vehicle at the 2013 Geneva Motor Show, with the production model being shown at the 2013 Frankfurt Motor Show, and went on sale in February 2014. The model was designed and developed in Europe. It is based on the architecture of the hatchback, and at launch, included most of the updates as mentioned above. Additionally, it includes an adaptive rear damping system and the largest capacity trunk space in its class (624 L VDA below tonneau). The Tourer also benefits from additional under floor storage compartments in the boot, 'Magic Seats' and 60:40 split rear seats. Overall length is 235 mm (9.3 in) longer than that of the five-door Civic hatchback.

Early Civic Tourer models include 1.6-litre i-DTEC engine from the Earth Dreams Technology series or the 1.8-litre i-VTEC engine, 6-speed manual (1.6 i-DTEC, 1.8 i-VTEC) or 5-speed automatic (1.8 i-VTEC) transmission. Advanced Driving Assist System package (available for Tourer) includes blind spot warning, traffic sign recognition, lane departure warning and active city braking.

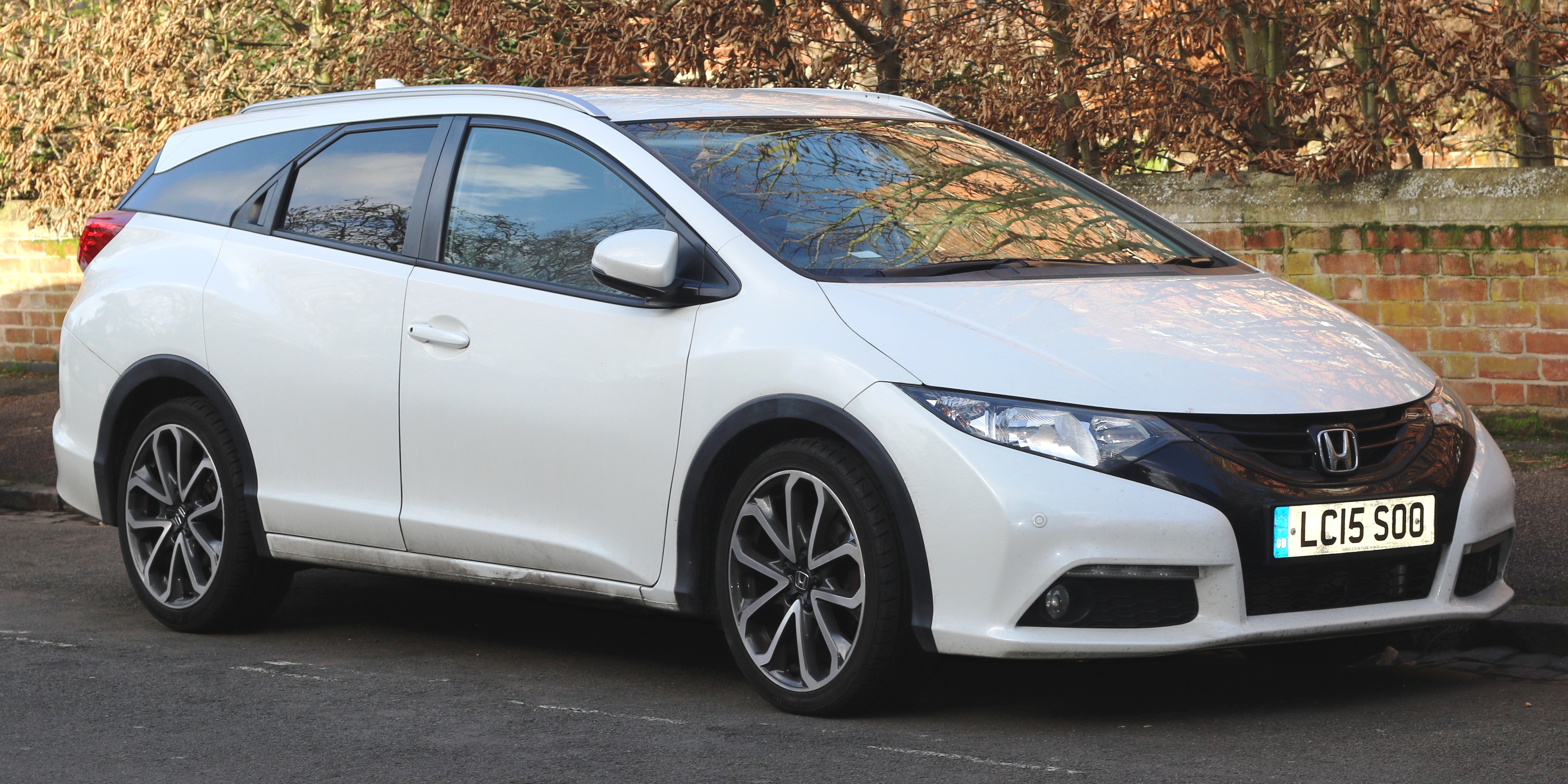
Civic Tourer

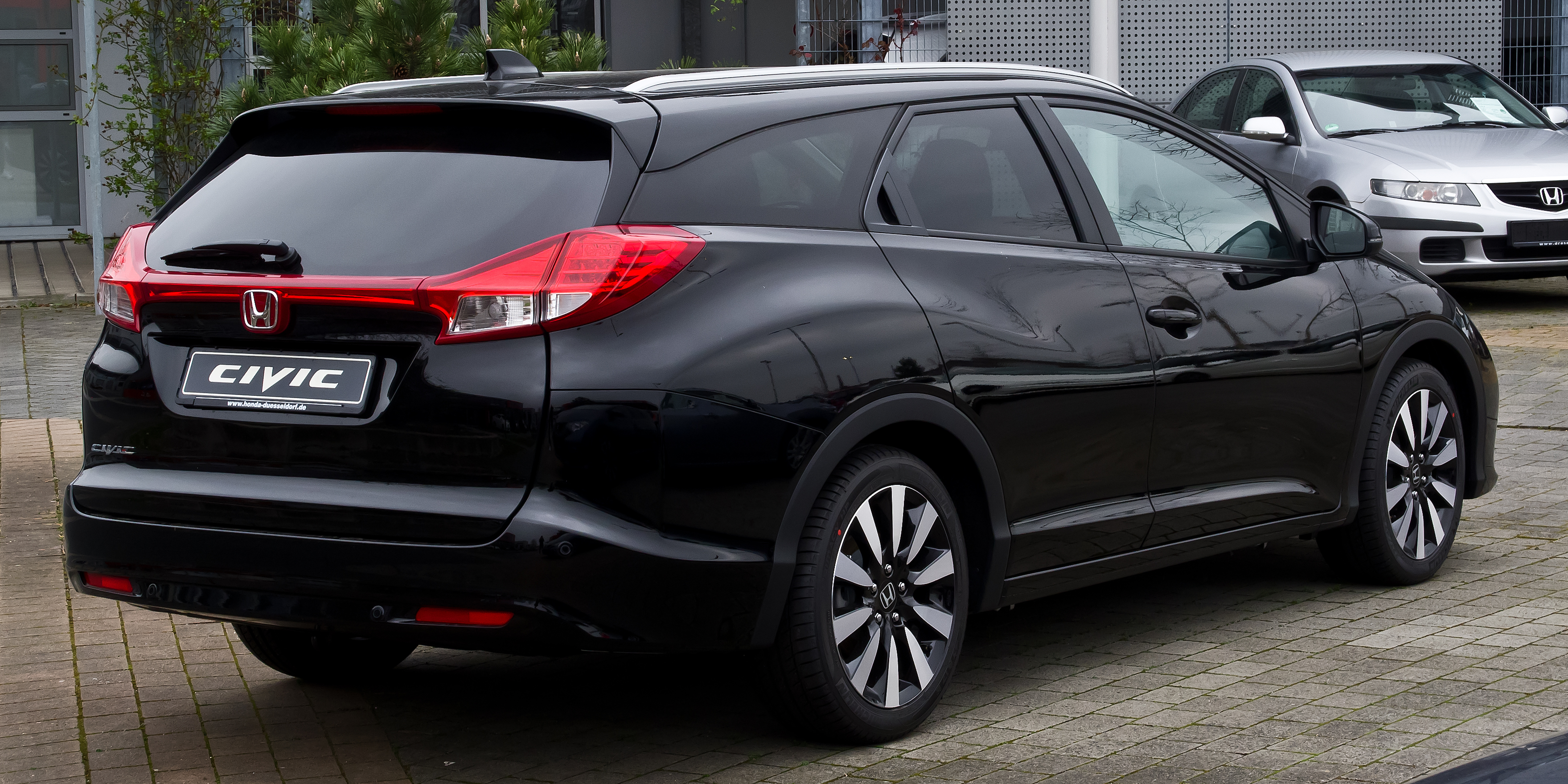
Rear view

=== Civic Type R (FK2; 2015–2017) ===
This is a version of the Civic 5-door hatchback for the European market, with a direct injection turbocharged 2.0 L (120 cu in) VTEC TURBO engine from Honda's Earth Dreams Technology range rated at 310 PS (228 kW; 306 hp) and 400 N⋅m (295 lb⋅ft) of torque at 2,500 rpm. The engine red lines at 7,000 rpm. 0–100 km/h (0–62 mph) takes 5.7 seconds and it has a top speed of 167 mph (269 km/h). All cars will use a six-speed manual gearbox.

Honda announced it had broken the Renault Megane 275 Trophy-R's 7:54.36 front-wheel-drive Nürburgring lap time. The new Honda Civic Type R posted a 7:50.63, beating the Renault by over three seconds, but the record was soon broken by VW GTI again.

750 units of the FK2 Civic Type R were exported to Japan, making it the only variant of the ninth-generation Civic officially sold in the Japanese market.

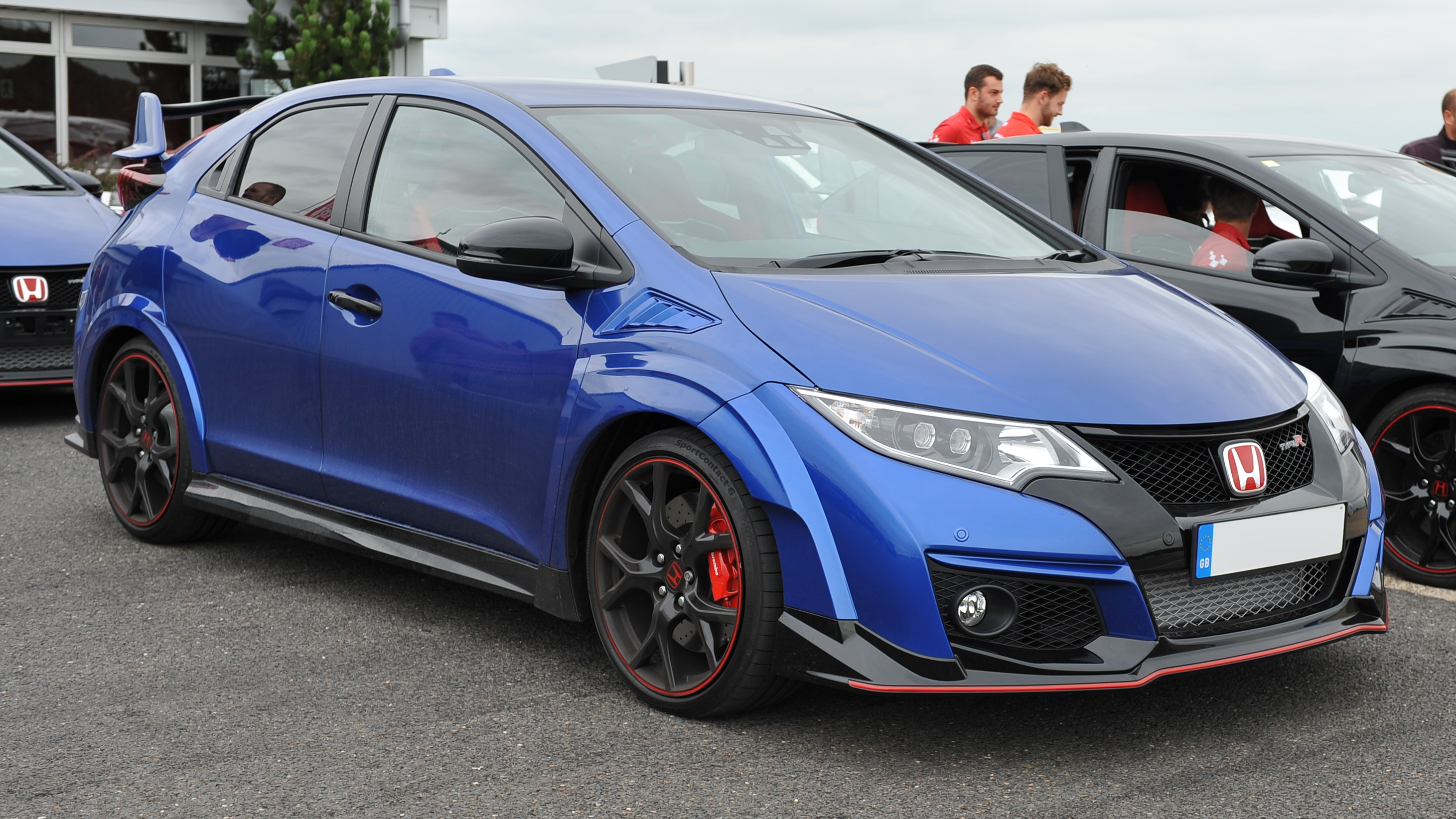
Honda Civic Type R (FK2)

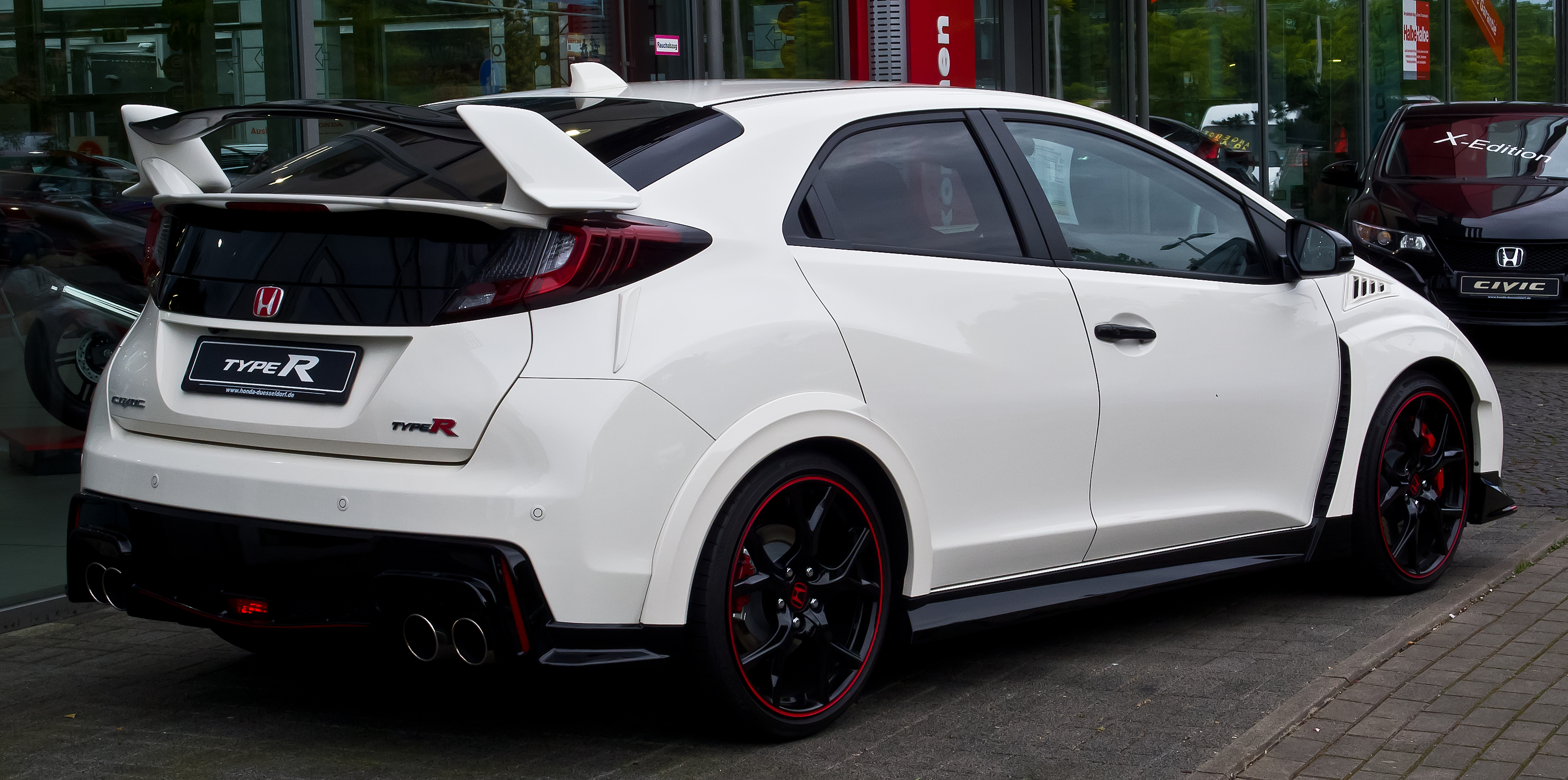
Rear view

=== Safety ===
ANCAP test results* Honda Civic all hatch variants (2012)
Test	Score
Overall	5 /5 stars
Frontal offset	15.03/16
Side impact	16/16
Pole	2/2
Seat belt reminders	3/3
Whiplash protection	Good
Pedestrian protection	Adequate
Electronic stability control	Standard

== Powertrain ==
Engine	Chassis code	Horsepower	Torque
1.3 L (marketed as 1.4L); L13Z4 I4 petrol	FK1 (Hatchback)	100 hp (75 kW) at 6,000 rpm	94 lb⋅ft (127 N⋅m) at 4,800 rpm
1.5 L LEA2 I4 hybrid	FB4 (Hybrid Sedan)	110 hp (82 kW) at 5,500 rpm	127 lb⋅ft (172 N⋅m) at 1,000–3,500 rpm
1.6 L R16B1 I4 petrol	FB1 (Sedan, Asia); FB7 (Sedan, Europe)	125 hp (93 kW) at 6,500 rpm	112 lb⋅ft (152 N⋅m) at 4,300 rpm
1.8 L R18Z1 I4 petrol	FB2 (Sedan); FG3 (Coupe)	140 hp (104 kW) at 6,500 rpm	128 lb⋅ft (174 N⋅m) at 4,300 rpm
1.8 L R18Z4 I4 petrol	FB8 (Sedan); FK2 (Hatchback and Tourer)	143 hp (107 kW) at 6,500 rpm	129 lb⋅ft (175 N⋅m) at 4,300 rpm
1.8 L R18A9 I4 petrol	FB5 (Natural Gas Sedan)	110 hp (82 kW) at 6,500 rpm	106 lb⋅ft (144 N⋅m) at 4,300 rpm
2.0 L R20Z1 I4 petrol	FB3 (Sedan)	153 hp (114 kW) at 6,500 rpm	140 lb⋅ft (190 N⋅m) at 4,300 rpm
2.4 L K24Z7 I4 petrol	FB6 (Si Sedan); FG4 (Si Coupe)	201 hp (150 kW) at 7,000 rpm (pre-facelift); 205 hp (153 kW) at 7,000 rpm (facelift)	170 lb⋅ft (230 N⋅m) at 4,400 rpm (pre-facelift); 174 lb⋅ft (236 N⋅m) at 4,400 rpm (facelift)
1.6 L N16A1 I4 turbo diesel	FK3 (Hatchback and Tourer)	118 hp (88 kW) at 4,000 rpm	221 lb⋅ft (300 N⋅m) at 2,000 rpm
2.2 L N22B4 I4 turbo diesel	FK3 (Hatchback)	150 hp (112 kW) at 4,000 rpm	258 lb⋅ft (350 N⋅m) at 2,000–2,750 rpm
2.0 L K20C1 I4 turbo petrol	FK2 (Type R Hatchback)	306 hp (228 kW) at 6,500 rpm	295 lb⋅ft (400 N⋅m) at 2,500–4,500 rpm

== Motorsport ==
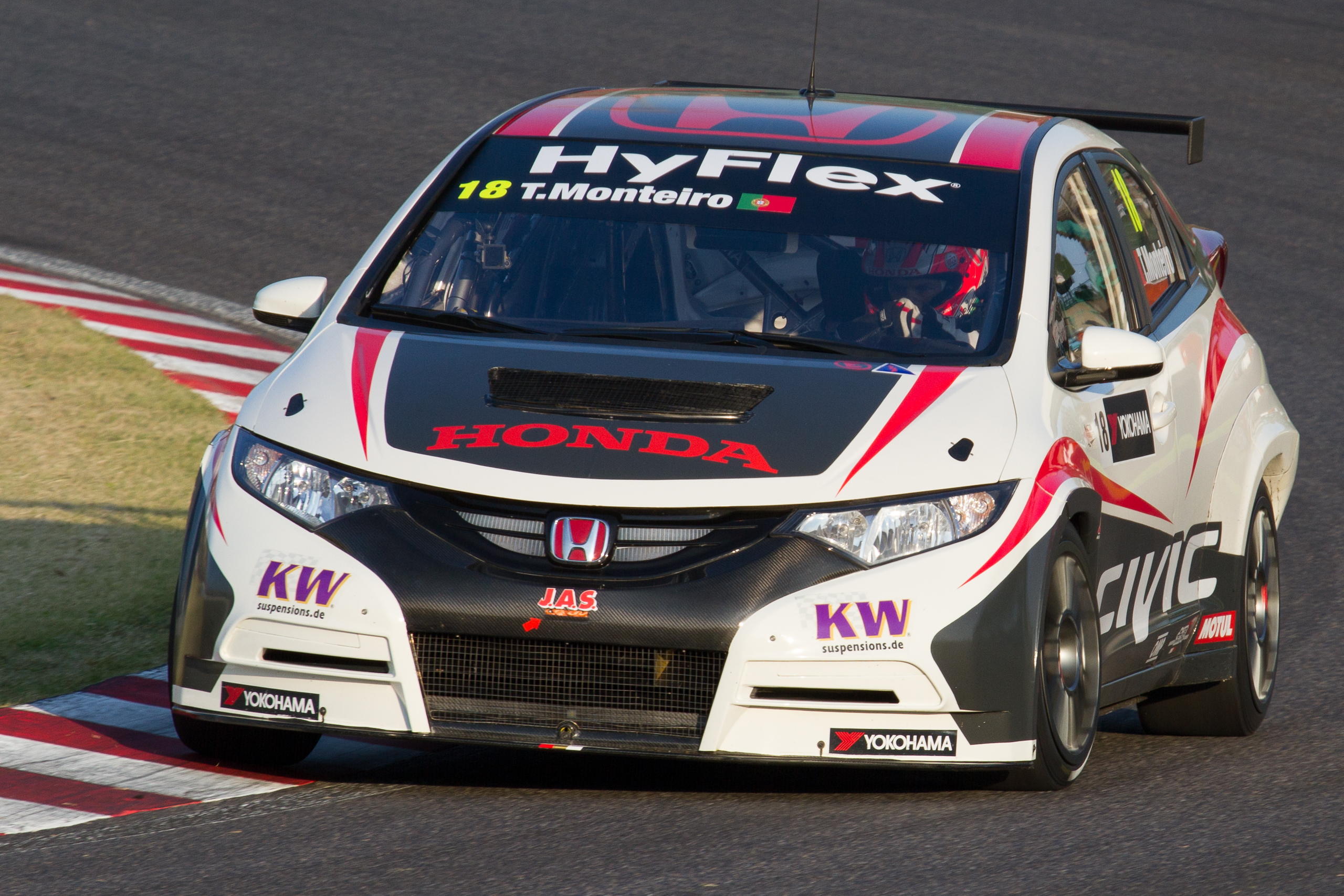
Tiago Monteiro's 2012 WTCC Honda Civic

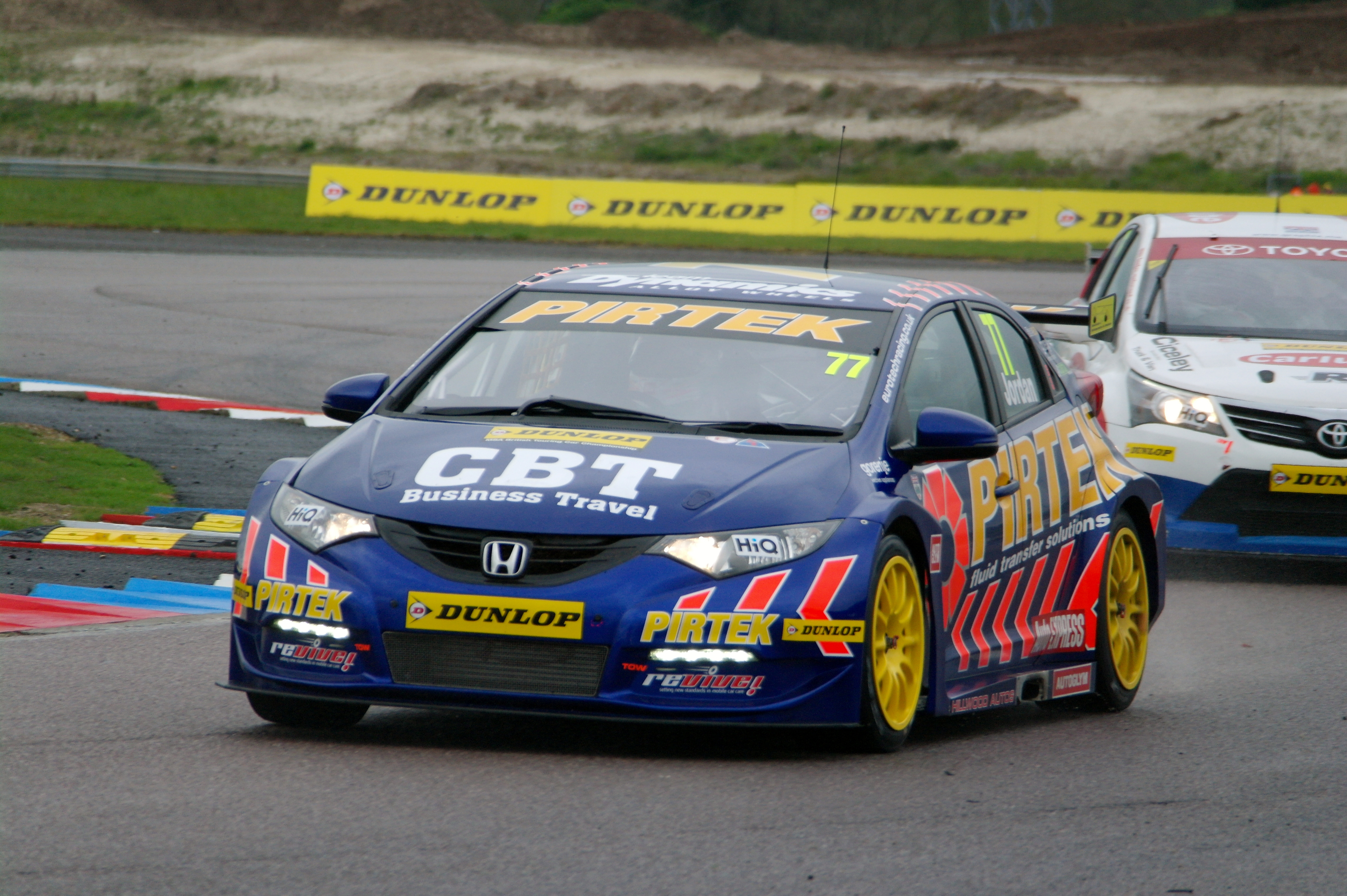
Andrew Jordan's 2012 BTCC Honda Civic

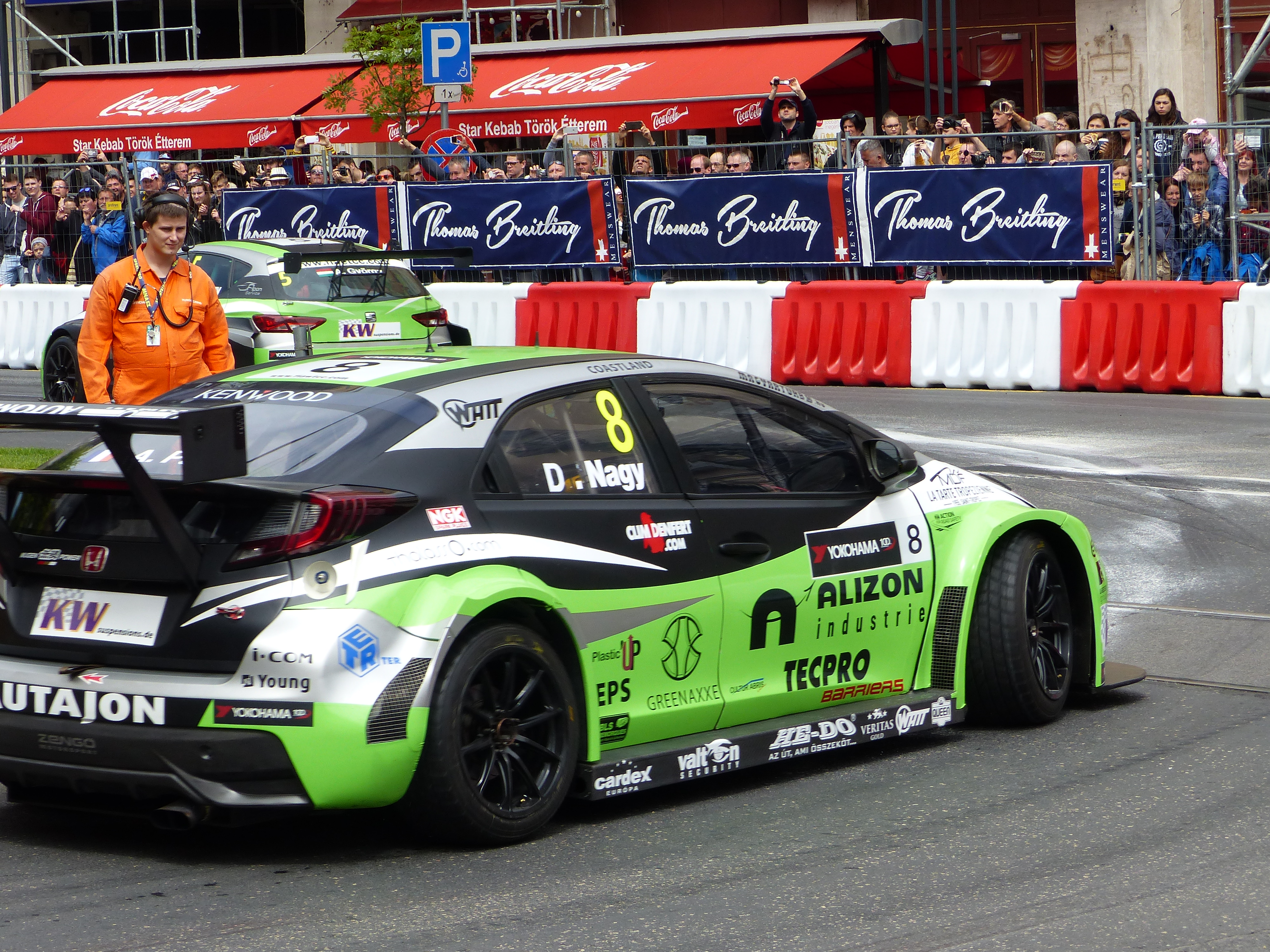
Nagy Futam's 2017 WTCC Honda Civic TC1

=== WTCC ===
Honda announced to enter the 2012 World Touring Car Championship (WTCC) with a racer built on the 2012 Euro Civic 5 door hatchback. The car is powered by HR412E - a bespoke, new 1.6-litre direct injection turbocharged engine developed by Honda's R&D Center in Tochigi, Japan. M-TEC Co., Ltd. manufactured and maintained 2013 Honda Civic WTCC, while JAS Motorsport of Italy, was responsible for vehicle body development and manufacturing, as well as team operations. It would race from October in Japan, China and Macau before a two car team join the 2013 championship race. The engine aims for higher efficiency and is said to herald "a new generation of high performance racing engines from Honda" and innovations during the engine's development will "further increase the efficiency of [Honda's] road car engines".

Tiago Monteiro raced in the final three races of the 2012 season at Suzuka, Shanghai and Macau. Monteiro won the third place in a race held in Macau. A second race car driven by Gabriele Tarquini was added from the 2013 season.

Gabriele Tarquini and Tiago Monteiro entered the 2013 FIA World Touring Car Championship with Civic WTCC cars. Three Honda Civic race cars made a clean sweep in races held in Slovakia and Shanghai by winning the first, second and third positions. Honda Racing Team JAS and Zengő Motorsport entered the 2013 WTCC tournament. Gabriele Tarquini won the overall second place in the 2013 WTCC drivers' championship and Honda won the Manufacturers' World Championship. The cars used a 1.6-litre inline-4 direct injection turbocharged engine with an intercooler and a dry oil sump.

Changes to the race cars for 2014 included wheel arch extensions, larger diameter wheels, sleeker aero package, extended rear spoiler and increased engine power.

Gabriele Tarquini and Tiago Monteiro of JAS Motorsport entered the 2014 World Touring Car Championship, with further Civics to be entered by private outfits Zengo Motorsport and Proteam Racing for Hungary's Norbert Michelisz and Moroccan Mehdi Bennani respectively.

=== BTCC ===
Honda entered the 2012 British Touring Car Championship with two NGTC compliant European Civic hatchbacks with Matt Neal and Gordon Shedden as drivers.

It was the first manufacturer supported team to commit to the newly introduced rule. Work on the first car started in July 2011 and testing on the track began in February 2012. Shedden won the 2012 champion title.

Honda Yuasa Racing also entered the 2014 Dunlop MSA British Touring Car Championship with a Civic Tourer race car.

=== American Touring Car Racing ===
Using the latest Honda Civics, Compass 360 Racing has continued to be successful in the SCCA World Challenge and the Continental Tire Sports Car Challenge.

Preceded by Honda Civic (eighth generation)	Honda Civic (ninth generation); 2011–2017	Succeeded by Honda Civic (tenth generation)
