= 2022 24 Hours of Nürburgring =

Endurance motor race in Germany

Nürburgring 24h track (Nordschleife+GP Circuit without Mercedes-Arena)

The 2022 Nürburgring 24 Hours (officially known as ADAC Totalenergies 24h Race at the Nürburgring Nordschleife for sponsorship reasons) was the 50th running of the Nürburgring 24 Hours and took place over 28–29 May 2022.

== Entry list ==
No.	Entrant	Car	Class	Driver 1	Driver 2	Driver 3	Driver 4
SP 9 FIA GT3 (33 entries) SP–X (3 entries)
1	(Germany) Manthey Racing	Porsche 911 GT3 R	P	(Denmark) Michael Christensen	(France) Kévin Estre	(France) Frédéric Makowiecki	(Belgium) Laurens Vanthoor
3	(Germany) Mercedes-AMG Team GetSpeed BWT	Mercedes-AMG GT3 Evo	P	(United Kingdom) Adam Christodoulou	(Germany) Maximilian Götz	(Germany) Fabian Schiller	
4	(Germany) Mercedes-AMG Team GetSpeed BWT	Mercedes-AMG GT3 Evo	P	(Germany) Maro Engel	(France) Jules Gounon	(Spain) Daniel Juncadella	
5	(Germany) Scherer Sport Team Phoenix	Audi R8 LMS Evo II	P	(Switzerland) Ricardo Feller	(Germany) Vincent Kolb	(South Africa) Kelvin van der Linde	(Germany) Frank Stippler
6	(Germany) Mercedes-AMG Team Bilstein by HRT	Mercedes-AMG GT3 Evo	PA	(Germany) Nico Bastian	(Germany) Hubert Haupt	(Italy) Gabriele Piana	(Germany) Marvin Dienst
7	(Austria) Konrad Motorsport	Lamborghini Huracán GT3 Evo	PA	(Germany) Maximilian Hackländer	(Zimbabwe) Axcil Jefferies	(Germany) Michele Di Martino	(South Africa) Jordan Pepper
11	(Netherlands) Twin Busch by Team Équipe-Vitesse	Audi R8 LMS Evo II	PA	(Germany) Elia Erhart	(Germany) Michael Heimrich	(Germany) Pierre Kaffer	(Germany) Arno Klasen
12	(Germany) Mercedes-AMG Team Bilstein by HRT	Mercedes-AMG GT3 Evo	P	(Switzerland) Philip Ellis	(Switzerland) Raffaele Marciello	(Germany) Luca Stolz	
14	(Germany) Hella Pagid - racing one	Ferrari 488 GT3	PA	(Netherlands) Jeroen Bleekemolen	(Australia) Nick Foster	(Germany) Christian Kohlhaas	(Netherlands) Jules Szymkowiak
15	(Germany) Audi Sport Team Phoenix	Audi R8 LMS Evo II	P	(Netherlands) Robin Frijns	(South Africa) Kelvin van der Linde	(Belgium) Dries Vanthoor	(Belgium) Frédéric Vervisch
16	(Germany) Scherer Sport Team Phoenix	Audi R8 LMS Evo II	P	(Italy) Michele Beretta	(Poland) Jakub Giermaziak	(Germany) Kim-Luis Schramm	(Germany) Markus Winkelhock
18	(Hong Kong) KCMG	Porsche 911 GT3 R	P	(New Zealand) Earl Bamber	(Norway) Dennis Olsen	(United Kingdom) Nick Tandy	
20	(Germany) Schubert Motorsport	BMW M4 GT3	P	(Germany) Jens Klingmann	(Finland) Jesse Krohn	(Germany) Niklas Krütten	(United Kingdom) Alexander Sims
21	(United States) CP Racing	Mercedes-AMG GT3 Evo	PA	(United States) Charles Espenlaub	(United States) Joe Foster	(United States) Shane Lewis	(United States) Charles Putman
22	(Germany) Audi Sport Team Car Collection	Audi R8 LMS Evo II	P	(Germany) Christopher Haase	(Switzerland) Nico Müller	(Switzerland) Patric Niederhauser	(Germany) René Rast
23	(Germany) Lionspeed by Car Collection Motorsport	Audi R8 LMS Evo II	PA	(Germany) Dennis Fetzer	(Germany) Klaus Koch	(Germany) Dennis Marschall	(Austria) Simon Reicher
24	(Germany) Audi Sport Team Lionspeed by Car Collection	Audi R8 LMS Evo II	P	(Italy) Mattia Drudi	(Germany) Patrick Kolb	(Germany) Christopher Mies	(Switzerland) Patric Niederhauser
25	(Germany) Huber Motorsport	Porsche 911 GT3 R	PA	(Germany) Lars Kern	(Germany) Nico Menzel	(Germany) Klaus Rader	(Germany) Joachim Thyssen
26	(Switzerland) Octane126 Serliana	Ferrari 488 GT3 Evo 2020	P	(Germany) Björn Grossmann	(Switzerland) Jonathan Hirschi	(Germany) Luca Ludwig	(Switzerland) Simon Trummer
27	(Germany) Toksport WRT	Porsche 911 GT3 R	P	(France) Julien Andlauer	(Australia) Matt Campbell	(France) Mathieu Jaminet	
28	(Italy) Dinamic Motorsport	Porsche 911 GT3 R	P	(Italy) Matteo Cairoli	(Germany) Christian Engelhart	(France) Côme Ledogar	(Austria) Thomas Preining
29	(Italy) Dinamic Motorsport	Porsche 911 GT3 R	P	(Italy) Matteo Cairoli	(Germany) Christian Engelhart	(Belgium) Adrien De Leener	(Denmark) Frederik Schandorff
33	(Germany) Falken Motorsports	Porsche 911 GT3 R	P	(New Zealand) Jaxon Evans	(Germany) Sven Müller	(France) Patrick Pilet	(Germany) Marco Seefried
34	(Germany) Schnitzelalm Racing	Mercedes-AMG GT3 Evo	PA	(Germany) Marek Böckmann	(Germany) Kenneth Heyer	(Switzerland) Yannick Mettler	(Germany) Johannes Stengel
44	(Germany) Falken Motorsports	Porsche 911 GT3 R	P	(Austria) Klaus Bachler	(Belgium) Alessio Picariello	(France) Patrick Pilet	(Austria) Martin Ragginger
55	(Germany) Mercedes-AMG Mann-Filter Team Landgraf	Mercedes-AMG GT3 Evo	PA	(Germany) Patrick Assenheimer	(Switzerland) Julien Apothéloz	(Austria) Dominik Baumann	(Germany) Luca-Sandro Trefz
72	(Germany) BMW Junior Team Shell	BMW M4 GT3	P	(United Kingdom) Daniel Harper	(Germany) Max Hesse	(United States) Neil Verhagen	
90	(United Kingdom) TF Sport AMR	Aston Martin Vantage AMR GT3	P	(Belgium) Maxime Martin	(United Kingdom) David Pittard	(Denmark) Marco Sørensen	(Denmark) Nicki Thiim
98	(Germany) Rowe Racing	BMW M4 GT3	P	(Netherlands) Nicky Catsburg	(United States) John Edwards	(South Africa) Sheldon van der Linde	(Germany) Marco Wittmann
99	(Germany) Rowe Racing	BMW M4 GT3	P	(Austria) Philipp Eng	(Brazil) Augusto Farfus	(United States) Connor De Phillippi	(United Kingdom) Nick Yelloly
100	(Germany) Walkenhorst Motorsport	BMW M4 GT3	PA	(Germany) Friedrich von Bohlen	(Germany) Jörg Breuer	(Germany) Henry Walkenhorst	(Germany) Andreas Ziegler
101	(Germany) Walkenhorst Motorsport	BMW M4 GT3	P	(Norway) Christian Krognes	(Germany) Jörg Müller	(Spain) Andy Soucek	(Finland) Sami-Matti Trogen
102	(Germany) Walkenhorst Motorsport	BMW M4 GT3	PA	(Germany) Mario von Bohlen	(Germany) Jörg Müller	(Germany) Jörn Schmidt-Staade	(United Kingdom) Ben Tuck
116	(Austria) KTM True Racing	KTM X-Bow GT2 Concept	S	(Germany) Tim Heinemann	(Austria) Max Hofer	(Austria) Reinhard Kofler	(Norway) Mads Siljehaug
117	(Austria) KTM True Racing	KTM X-Bow GT2 Concept	S	(Austria) Reinhard Kofler	(Finland) Markus Palttala	(Austria) Ferdinand Stuck	(Austria) Johannes Stuck
706	(United States) Glickenhaus Racing	Scuderia Cameron Glickenhaus SCG004c	S	(Germany) Felipe Fernández Laser	(Germany) Thomas Mutsch	(France) Franck Mailleux	(United Kingdom) Richard Westbrook
SP 10 – SRO GT4 (8 entries)
69	(Germany) Dörr Motorsport	Aston Martin Vantage AMR GT4		(Germany) Finn Albig	(Germany) Stefan Kenntemich	(Germany) Dierk Möller	(Germany) Frank Weishar
78	(Germany) FK Performance Motorsport	BMW M4 GT4		(United Kingdom) Ben Green	(Germany) Marcel Lenerz	(France) Thomas Neubauer	(Germany) Michael Schrey
79	(Belgium) JJ Motorsport	BMW M4 GT4		(Belgium) Hakan Sari	(Belgium) Recep Sari	(Turkey) Ersin Yücesan	
81	(Germany) PROsport Racing	Aston Martin Vantage AMR GT4		(Belgium) Guido Dumarey	(Germany) Michael Hess	(Ukraine) Yevgen Sokolovsky	(Switzerland) Alexander Walker
82	(Germany) PROsport Racing	Aston Martin Vantage AMR GT4		(Switzerland) Miklas Born	(Germany) Christoph Breuer	(Germany) Alexander Mies	(Germany) Mike David Ortmann
83	(Germany) Toyo Tires with TGR Ring Racing	Toyota GR Supra GT4		(Germany) Andreas Gülden	(Germany) Michael Tischner	(Germany) Heiko Tönges	
84	(Germany) Toyo Tires with TGR Ring Racing	Toyota GR Supra GT4		(Germany) Lance David Arnold	(Germany) Tobias Vazquez-Garcia	(Germany) Janis Waldow	
85	(Germany) Black Falcon Team TEXTAR	Porsche 718 Cayman GT4 RS Clubsport		(Germany) Martin Meenen	(Germany) Marco Müller	(Germany) Carsten Palluth	(Germany) Tobias Wahl
Cup2 Porsche 992 Cup (11 entries)
121	(Germany) Black Falcon Team IDENTICA	Porsche 992 GT3 Cup		(Netherlands) Paul Harkema	(Germany) Tobias Müller	(Germany) Noah Nagelsdiek	(Germany) Tim Scheerbarth
122	(Germany) Black Falcon	Porsche 992 GT3 Cup		(United States) Peter Ludwig	(Germany) Noah Nagelsdiek	(Germany) Maik Rosenberg	(Germany) Reinhold Renger
123	(Germany) Black Falcon	Porsche 992 GT3 Cup		(Germany) Ben Bünnagel	(Turkey) Mustafa Mehmet Kaya	(Italy) Gabriele Piana	(Germany) Mike Stursberg
125	(Germany) Huber Motorsport	Porsche 992 GT3 Cup		(Germany) Stefan Aust	(Germany) Christian Bollrath	(Germany) Jacob Schell	(Germany) Hans Wehrmann
126	(United States) Krohn Racing	Porsche 992 GT3 Cup		(Germany) Mario Farnbacher	(Netherlands) Patrick Huisman	(Sweden) Nic Jönsson	(United States) Tracy Krohn
127	(Germany) KKrämer Racing	Porsche 992 GT3 Cup		(Germany) Christopher Brück	(Germany) Karsten Krämer	(Germany) Moritz Kranz	(Germany) Alexej Veremenko
128	(Germany) Frikadelli Racing Team	Porsche 992 GT3 Cup		(Germany) Klaus Abbelen	(Germany) Hendrik von Danwitz	(Turkey) Ayhancan Güven	(United Kingdom) Julian Harrison
129	(United Kingdom) Moore International Motorsport	Porsche 992 GT3 Cup		(Germany) Peter Bonk	(Germany) Bill Cameron	(United Kingdom) Jim Cameron	
131	(Belgium) Mühlner Motorsport	Porsche 992 GT3 Cup		(Germany) Marcel Hoppe	(Germany) Thorsten Jung	(Germany) Michael Rebhan	(Germany) Nick Saleswky
132	(Germany) IronForce Racing by Phoenix	Porsche 992 GT3 Cup		(Germany) Luca Engstler	(Germany) Leon Köhler	(Germany) Timo Scheider	(Germany) Jan-Erik Slooten
135	(Germany) Clickversicherung Team	Porsche 992 GT3 Cup		(Germany) Robin Chrzanowski	(Germany) Kersten Jodexnis	(Germany) Max Koch	(New Zealand) Peter Scharmach
Cup3 Cayman GT4 Trophy (13 entries)
250	(Germany) W&S Motorsport	Porsche 718 Cayman GT4 Clubsport		(Germany) Dirk Biermann	(Germany) Axel Duffner	(Germany) René Höber	(Germany) Jürgen Vöhringer
251	(Germany) AVIA W&S Motorsport	Porsche 718 Cayman GT4 Clubsport		(Switzerland) Benedikt Frei	(Switzerland) Viktor Schyrba	(Switzerland) Markus Zünd	(Switzerland) Urs Zünd
252	(Germany) KKrämer Racing	Porsche 718 Cayman GT4 Clubsport		(United States) Jean-Francois Brunot	(Germany) Henning Cramer	(United States) Andreas Gabler	(Netherlands) Jan Jaap van Roon
253	(Germany) G-Tech Competition	Porsche 718 Cayman GT4 Clubsport		(Germany) Daniel Blickle	(Germany) Fabio Grosse	(Switzerland) Patrick Grütter	(Germany) Herbert Lösch
254	(Germany) 9und11	Porsche 718 Cayman GT4 Clubsport		(Germany) Leonard Oehme	(Germany) Moritz Oehme	(Germany) Niklas Oehme	(Germany) Ralf Oehme
255	(Germany) KKrämer Racing UG	Porsche 718 Cayman GT4 Clubsport		(Germany) Simon Eibl	(Germany) Alexander Kroker	(Germany) John-Lee Schambony	(Germany) Tobias Wolf
256	(Germany) KKrämer Racing UG	Porsche 718 Cayman GT4 Clubsport		(Germany) Olaf Baunack	(Luxembourg) Sebastien Carcone	(Germany) Heiko Gros	(Germany) Sabrina Gros
257	(Germany) Team Sorg Rennsport	Porsche 718 Cayman GT4 Clubsport		(Germany) Stefan Beyer	(Germany) Heiko Eichenberg	(Germany) Fidel Leib	(Germany) Björn Simon
261	(Germany) Team Mathol Racing	Porsche 718 Cayman GT4 Clubsport		(United Kingdom) Peter Cate	(New Zealand) Tony Richards	(Switzerland) Rüdiger Schicht	(Germany) "Montana"
262	(Germany) Team Mathol Racing	Porsche 718 Cayman GT4 Clubsport		(Germany) Daniel Bohr	(Belgium) Tom Cloet	(Germany) Heinz Dolfen	(Germany) Oliver Louisoder
263	(Germany) FK Performance Motorsport	Porsche 718 Cayman GT4 Clubsport		(Germany) Jens Moetefindt	(Germany) Florian Naumann	(Germany) Moritz Oberheim	(Germany) Torsten Wolter
264	(Germany) Schmickler Performance powered by Ravenol	Porsche 718 Cayman GT4 Clubsport		(Switzerland) Mauro Calamia	(Switzerland) Ivan Jacoma	(Switzerland) Roberto Pampanini	(Germany) Kai Riemer
TCR Class (7 entries)
66	(Germany) MSC Emstal e.V. im ADAC	Volkswagen Golf GTI TCR		(Germany) Peter Elkmann	(Italy) Daniel Fink	(Italy) Florian Haller	(Germany) Sebastian Schemmann
811	(Germany) Max Kruse Racing	Audi RS3 LMS TCR (2017)		(Denmark) Peter Hansen	(Germany) Benjamin Leuchter	(Denmark) Lars Nielsen	
814	(Germany) mathilda racing	CUPRA León TCR		(Germany) Joachim Nett	(Germany) Jürgen Nett	(Austria) Lukas Niedertscheider	(Germany) Michael Paatz
830	(South Korea) Hyundai Motorsport N	Hyundai Elantra N TCR		(Spain) Mikel Azcona	(Germany) Marc Basseng	(Germany) Manuel Lauck	
831	(South Korea) Hyundai Motorsport N	Hyundai i30 N TCR		(Finland) Antti Buri	(Germany) Moritz Oestreich	(France) Jean-Karl Vernay	
832	(Germany) asBest Racing	CUPRA León TCR		(Germany) Davide Dehren	(Germany) Klaus-Dieter Frommer	(Germany) Daniel Jolk	
833	(Germany) Bonk Motorsport	CUPRA León Competición TCR		(Germany) Hermann Bock	(Germany) Michael Fischer	(Germany) Max Partl	(Switzerland) Alex Prinz
Other Classes
SP 8T (5 entries)
80	(Germany) PROsport Racing	Aston Martin Vantage AMR GT4		(Belgium) Simon Balcaen	(Belgium) Guillaume Dumarey	(Belgium) Maxime Dumarey	(Belgium) Jean Glorieux
95	(Germany) Dörr Motorsport	Aston Martin Vantage AMR GT4		(Netherlands) Indy Dontje	(Germany) Phil Dörr	(Germany) Nick Hancke	(Germany) Moritz Wiskirchen
150	(Germany) Dörr Motorsport	Aston Martin Vantage AMR GT4		(Germany) Michael Funke	(Germany) Christian Gebhardt	(Germany) Peter Rosavac	(Germany) Rolf Scheibner
220	(Germany) Giti Tire Motorsport By WS Racing	BMW M4 GT4		(United Kingdom) Pippa Mann	(France) Célia Martin	(Germany) Carrie Schreiner	(Liechtenstein) Fabienne Wohlwend
SP 7 (1 entry)
70	(Germany) Huber Motorsport	Porsche 991 GT3 II Cup		(Germany) Ulrich Berg	(Germany) Rodriguez Menzl	(Germany) Philip Hamprecht	
SP 6 (1 entry)
200	(Switzerland) Hofor Racing	BMW M3 E46 GTR		(Switzerland) Martin Kroll	(Switzerland) Michael Kroll	(Switzerland) Alexander Prinz	(Switzerland) Chantal Prinz
SP 4T (2 entries)
181		Porsche 718 Cayman GT4 Clubsport		(Germany) Alexander Köppen	(Germany) Jacek Pydys	(Germany) Andreas Schaflitzl	
718	(Germany) Racing Group Eifel by NEXEN TIRE Motorsport	Porsche 718 Cayman GT4 Clubsport		(Germany) Christian Dannesberger	(Germany) Norbert Fischer	(Germany) Fabian Peitzmeier	(Germany) Ralf Zensen
SP 3 (6 entries)
118	(Germany) Team mokoflex	Dacia Logan		(Germany) Jürgen Bussmann	(Germany) Oliver Kriese	(Germany) Michael Lachmeyer	(Germany) Yannik Lachmeyer
119	Toyota Gazoo Racing Team Thailand	Toyota Corolla Altis GT N24		(Thailand) Suttipong Smittachartch	(Thailand) Nattavude Charoensukhawatana	(Thailand) Manat Kulapalanont	(Thailand) Nattapong Hortongkum
120	Toyota Gazoo Racing Team Thailand	Toyota Corolla Altis GT N24		(Taiwan) Chen Jian Hong	(Japan) Naoki Kawamura	(Thailand) Grant Supaphongs	
140	(Belgium) Pit Lane - AMC Sankt Vith	Toyota GT86 Cup		(Belgium) Jacques Derenne	(Belgium) Kurt Dujardyn	(Belgium) Oliver Muytjens	(Belgium) "Brody"
143	(Germany) MSC Sinzig e.V. im ADAC	VW Golf 3 16V		(Germany) Carsten Erpenbach	(Germany) Raphael Klingmann	(Germany) Ralph Liesenfeld	(Germany) Philipp Eis
SP 3T (7 entries)
10	(Germany) Max Kruse Racing	Volkswagen Golf GTI TCR		(Germany) Heiko Hammel	(Germany) Marek Schaller	(Switzerland) Frédéric Yerly	(Germany) Matthias Wasel
89	(Germany) Jung Motorsport	Opel Astra OPC Cup		(Portugal) Carlos Antunes Tavares	(France) Jean Marc Finot	(France) Jean Philippe Imparato	(France) Francois Wales
112	(Germany) Bulldog Racing	MINI John Cooper Works GP		(Germany) Danny Brink	(Germany) Jens Dralle	(Germany) Markus Fischer	(Germany) Uwe Krumscheid
113	(Switzerland) Autorama Ag	SEAT León Cup Racer		(Switzerland) Armando Stanco	(Switzerland) Dario Stanco	(Switzerland) Luigi Stanco	
114	(Japan) Subaru Tecnica International	Subaru WRX STI GT N24		(Netherlands) Carlo van Dam	(Germany) Marcel Lasée	(Japan) Kota Sasaki	(Germany) Tim Schrick
115	(Germany) MSC Sinzig e.V. im ADAC	Volkswagen Golf GTI TCR		(Armenia) Artur Goroyan	(Germany) Arndt Hallmanns	(Germany) Christian Meurer	(Germany) Rudi Speich
310	(Germany) Max Kruse Racing	Volkswagen Golf GTI TCR		(Turkey) Emir Asari	(United States) Andrew Engelmann	(Switzerland) Jasmin Preisig	(Brazil) Gustavo Xavier
V6 (5 entries)
221	(Germany) Giti Tire Motorsport By WS Racing	Porsche Cayman		(United Kingdom) David Drinkwater	(Denmark) Nicolai Kandborg	(Germany) Niklas Kry	(Germany) Nils Steinberg
227	(Germany) Team Sorg Rennsport	Porsche Cayman S		(Italy) Alberto Carobbio	(Germany) Cesar Mendieta	(Germany) Reinhard Schmiechel	(Italy) Ugo Vicenzi
228	(Germany) Team Sorg Rennsport	Porsche Cayman S		(Switzerland) Caryl Fritsche	(Denmark) Rasmus Helmich	(Monaco) Xavier Lamadrid	(France) Fabrice Reicher
396	(Germany) Adrenalin Motorsport Team Alzner Automotive	Porsche 981 Cayman S		(Germany) Christian Büllesbach	(Germany) Guido Heinrich	(Germany) Stefan Kruse	(Germany) Andreas Schettler
397		Porsche 911		(Germany) Alexander Köppen	(Germany) Lukas Pickard	(Luxembourg) Alain Pier	(Germany) Sebastian Rings
V5 (1 entry)
444	(Germany) Adrenalin Motorsport Team Alzner Automotive	Porsche Cayman GT4 Clubsport MR		(Spain) Carlos Arimón	(Germany) Daniel Korn	(Germany) Tobias Korn	(Germany) Ulrich Korn
V4 (3 entries)
322	(Germany) keeevin-racing.de MSC Wahlscheid e. V. im ADAC	BMW E90 325i		(Sweden) Dan Berghult	(Germany) Frank Blass	(Switzerland) Juha Miettinnen	
323	(United Kingdom) Rockstar Games by Viken Motorsport & Tomcat	BMW E90 325i		(Germany) Markus Löw	(United Kingdom) Benjamin Lyons	(Germany) Dale Lomas	
324	(Germany) FK Performance	BMW 325i		(Germany) Jürgen Huber	(Germany) Christian Knötschke	(Germany) Maximilian Kurz	(Germany) Simon Sagmeister
VT3 (1 entry)
300	(Germany) Team Mathol Racing	Porsche 718 Cayman S		(Argentina) Marcos Adolfo Vazquez	(Germany) Matthias Trinius	(Germany) Thorsten Held	(Germany) Max Walter von Bär
VT2 (13 entries)
87	(Germany) Jung Motorsport	Opel Astra OPC	VTF	(Germany) Michael Eichhorn	(Germany) Daniel Jenichen	(Germany) Tobias Jung	(Germany) Volker Strycek
88	(Germany) Jung Motorsport	Opel Astra OPC	VTF	(Germany) Lars Füting	(Germany) Dr. Volker Kühn	(Germany) Tim Robertz	(Germany) Andreas Winterwerber
222	(Germany) Giti Tire Motorsport By WS Racing	BMW 328i Racing	VTH	(Germany) Mathias Möller	(New Zealand) Wayne Moore	(Germany) Fabian Pirrone	(Germany) Detlef Stelbrink
223	(Germany) Giti Tire Motorsport By WS Racing	Volkswagen Golf VII GTI AU	VTF	(Germany) Robert Hinzer	(Germany) Axel Jahn	(Germany) Ulrich Schmidt	(Germany) Lutz Wolzenburg
224	(Germany) Team Sorg Rennsport	BMW 330i Racing (2020)	VTH	(Germany) Heinz Jürgen Kroner	(Germany) Olaf Meyer	(Germany) Hans Joachim Theiss	(Austria) Bernhard Wagner
226	(Germany) Team Sorg Rennsport	BMW 330i Racing (2020)	VTH	(Germany) Nicolas Griebner	(Mexico) Luis Ramirez	(Germany) Daniel Niermann	(Germany) Kevin Warum
330	(Germany) Adrenalin Motorsport Team Alzner Automotive	BMW 330i Racing (2020)	VTH	(Germany) Jacob Erlbacher	(Germany) Daniel Zils	(Germany) Christopher Rink	(Germany) Oskar Sandberg
331	(Germany) Adrenalin Motorsport Team Alzner Automotive	BMW 330i Racing (2020)	VTH	(Switzerland) Michelangelo Comazzi	(Germany) Frank Haack	(Germany) Philipp Leisen	(Switzerland) Guido Wirtz
332	(South Korea) Hyundai Driving Experience	Hyundai i30 Fastback N	VTF	(Germany) Michael Bohrer	(Germany) Stephan Epp	(Germany) Gerrit Holthaus	(Germany) Marcus Willhardt
333	(Germany) DRUCKREGELT&WAPPLER by Mertens Motorsport MSC Adenau e.V. im ADAC	Hyundai i30 Fastback N	VTF	(Germany) Stefan Endres	(Germany) Daniel Mertens	(United States) Jeff Ricca	(Germany) Kurt Strube
334	(Germany) MSG Bayerischer Wald Hutthurm e.V. im ADAC	BMW 328i Racing	VTH	(Germany) Jörg Schönfelder	(Germany) Christian Schotte	(Germany) Serge Van Vooren	
335	(Germany) MSC Adenau e.V. im ADAC	Renault Mégane III RS	VTF	(Germany) David Ackermann	(Germany) Holger Gachot	(Germany) Dirk Vleugels	(Germany) "Moritz"
336	(Germany) FK Performance Motorsport	BMW 330i Racing (2020)	VTH	(Germany) Danny Brink	(Germany) Christian Konnerth	(Switzerland) Ranko Mijatovic	(Germany) Florian Quante
AT (6 entries)
13	(Germany) Fly&Help	Dodge Viper Competition Coupe GT3		(Germany) Bernd Albrecht	(Germany) Sebastian Asch	(Germany) Kurt Ecke	(Germany) Andreas Sczepansky
86	(Japan) Toyota Gazoo Racing Europe United	Toyota GR Supra GT4		(Germany) Adrian Brusius	(Hungary) Adam Lengyel	(Germany) Lars Peucker	(Germany) Finn Unteroberdörster
109	(Germany) OVR Racing Cologne	Ford Mustang GT N24		(Germany) Ralph Caba	(Germany) Michael Mohr	(Germany) Oliver Sprungmann	
320	(Germany) Four Motors	Porsche 991 GT3 II Cup		(Luxembourg) Charles Kauffman	(Germany) Thomas Kiefer	(Germany) Thomas von Löwis of Menar	(Germany) "Smudo"
420	(Germany) Four Motors	Porsche 718 Cayman GT4 Clubsport		(Germany) Matthias Beckwermert	(Denmark) Henrik Bollerslev	(Germany) Christian Hewer	(Netherlands) Marco van Ramshorst
633	(Germany) Four Motors	Porsche Cayman GT4 Clubsport MR		(Switzerland) Nicola Bravetti	(Germany) Karl Pflanz	(Switzerland) Ivan Reggiani	(Switzerland) Marco Timbal
M240i (6 entries)
240	(Germany) Adrenalin Motorsport Team Alzner Automotive	BMW M240i Racing		(Germany) Sven Markert	(Germany) Sascha Padulovic	(Germany) Zoran Padulovic	(Germany) Robin Reimer
241	(Germany) Adrenalin Motorsport Team Alzner Automotive	BMW M240i Racing		(Germany) Thomas Ardelt	(Germany) Manuel Dormagen	(Germany) Sven Oepen	(Germany) Simon Klemund
242	(Germany) Adrenalin Motorsport Team Alzner Automotive	BMW M240i Racing		(Spain) Guillermo Aso	(Spain) Alvaro Fontes	(Germany) Harald Leppert	(Germany) Ronny Leppert
243	(Germany) mcchip-dkr	BMW M240i Racing		(Germany) Sascha Hancke	(Germany) Lucas Lange	(Germany) Sascha Lott	(Germany) Alexander Meixner
245	(Germany) Schnitzelalm Racing	BMW M240i Racing		(Germany) Marco Büsker	(Germany) Björn Griesemann	(Germany) Tim Neuser	(United States) David Thilenius
246	(Switzerland) Hofor Racing by Bonk Motorsport	BMW M240i Racing		(Germany) Michael Bonk	(Germany) Bernd Küpper	(Germany) Jürgen Meyer	(Germany) Thomas Mühlenz
Cup5 (2 entries)
871	(Germany) Adrenalin Motorsport Team Alzner Automotive	BMW M2 ClubSport Racing		(France) Philippe Haezebrouck	(Germany) Roland Froese	(Japan) Ryusho Konishi	(Germany) Alexander Müller
880	(Germany) Schubert Motorsport	BMW M2 ClubSport Racing		(Japan) Takayuki Kinoshita	(Germany) Torsten Schubert	(Germany) Stefan von Zabiensky	(Germany) Michael von Zabiensky
CupX (4 entries)
160	(Germany) Teichmann Racing GTX	KTM X-Bow GTX Concept		(Germany) Georg Griesemann	(Germany) Felix von der Laden	(Germany) Maik Rönnefarth	(Germany) Yves Volte
161	(Germany) Teichmann Racing GTX	KTM X-Bow GTX Concept		(Germany) Stephan Brodmerkel	(Austria) Laura Kraihamer	(Austria) Constantin Schöll	(Germany) Henrik Still
162	(Germany) Teichmann Racing GTX	KTM X-Bow GTX Concept		(Germany) Dirk Adorf	(Switzerland) Manuel Amweg	(Germany) Tim Sandtler	(Germany) Florian Wolf
163	(Germany) Teichmann Racing GT4	KTM X-Bow GT4		(Germany) Phil Hill	(Germany) Michael Mönch	(Germany) Andreas Tasche	(Germany) "Maximilian"

Icon	Class
GT3 entries
P	SP9 GT3-Pro
PA	SP9 GT3 Pro-Am
S	SPX
VT2 Production entries
VTF	VT2 Front
VTH	VT2 Hecka

== Qualifying ==
=== Top Qualifying / Starting Group 1 ===
Pos.	Class	No.	Team	Car	Fastest lap from Qualifying 1, 2 and 3	Top Qualifying 1	Top Qualifying 2
1	SP 9 Pro	26	(Switzerland) Octane126 Serliana	Ferrari 488 GT3 Evo 2020	8:18.373		8:09.469
2	SP 9 Pro	99	(Germany) Rowe Racing	BMW M4 GT3	8:17.945		8:10.640
3	SP 9 Pro	7	(Austria) Konrad Motorsport	Lamborghini Huracán GT3 Evo	8:16.449		8:10.788
4	SP 9 Pro	22	(Germany) Audi Sport Team Car Collection	Audi R8 LMS Evo II	8:17.392		8:11.210
5	SP 9 Pro	16	(Germany) Scherer Sport Team Phoenix	Audi R8 LMS Evo II	8:19.517		8:11.554
6	SP 9 Pro	72	(Germany) BMW Junior Team Shell	BMW M4 GT3	8:19.167		8:11.558
7	SP 9 Pro	101	(Germany) Walkenhorst Motorsport	BMW M4 GT3	8:15.936		8:11.845
8	SP 9 Pro	12	(Germany) Mercedes-AMG Team Bilstein by HRT	Mercedes-AMG GT3 Evo	8:16.176		8:11.866
9	SP 9 Pro-Am	25	(Germany) Huber Motorsport	Porsche 911 GT3 R	8:27.154		8:11.928
10	SP 9 Pro-Am	6	(Germany) Mercedes-AMG Team Bilstein by HRT	Mercedes-AMG GT3 Evo	8:18.279		8:12.173
11	SP 9 Pro	24	(Germany) Audi Sport Team Lionspeed by Car Collection	Audi R8 LMS Evo II	8:19.830		8:12.367
12	SP 9 Pro	4	(Germany) Mercedes-AMG Team GetSpeed BWT	Mercedes-AMG GT3 Evo	8:19.300	8:12.376	8:12.457
13	SP 9 Pro	98	(Germany) Rowe Racing	BMW M4 GT3	8:14.771	8:11.039	8:12.772
14	SP 9 Pro	27	(Germany) Toksport WRT	Porsche 911 GT3 R	8:15.967	8:12.672	8:12.962
15	SP 9 Pro-Am	34	(Germany) Schnitzelalm Racing	Mercedes-AMG GT3 Evo	8:21.226		8:13.571
16	SP 9 Pro	28	(Italy) Dinamic Motorsport	Porsche 911 GT3 R	8:18.145	8:12.688	8:13.720
17	SP 9 Pro	3	(Germany) Mercedes-AMG Team GetSpeed BWT	Mercedes-AMG GT3 Evo	8:19.049		8:13.962
18	SP 9 Pro-Am	102	(Germany) Walkenhorst Motorsport	BMW M4 GT3	8:25.986		8:14.970
19	SP 9 Pro-Am	23	(Germany) Lionspeed by Car Collection Motorsport	Audi R8 LMS Evo II	8:25.965		8:19.508
20	SP 9 Pro	20	(Germany) Schubert Motorsport	BMW M4 GT3	8:17.892	8:12.883	
21	SP 9 Pro	15	(Germany) Scherer Sport Team Phoenix	Audi R8 LMS Evo II	8:18.651	8:13.059	
22	SP X	116	(Austria) KTM True Racing	KTM X-Bow GT2 Concept	8:16.829	8:13.095	
23	SP 9 Pro	5	(Germany) Scherer Sport Team Phoenix	Audi R8 LMS Evo II	8:16.418	8:13.096	
24	SP 9 Pro	33	(Germany) Falken Motorsports	Porsche 911 GT3 R	8:19.966	8:13.098	
25	SP 9 Pro	90	(United Kingdom) TF Sport AMR	Aston Martin Vantage AMR GT3	8:18.915	8:13.145	
26	SP 9 Pro	18	(Hong Kong) KCMG	Porsche 911 GT3 R	8:19.573	8:14.541	
27	SP 9 Pro-Am	55	(Germany) Mercedes-AMG Mann-Filter Team Landgraf	Mercedes-AMG GT3 Evo	8:16.060	8:15.575	
28	SP 9 Pro	29	(Italy) Dinamic Motorsport	Porsche 911 GT3 R	8:21.835	8:17.786	
29	SP 9 Pro-Am	14	(Germany) Hella Pagid - racing one	Ferrari 488 GT3	8:24.629	8:20.859	
30	SP 9 Pro-Am	11	(Netherlands) Twin Busch by Team Équipe-Vitesse	Audi R8 LMS Evo II	8:37.197	8:22.371	
31	SP 9 Pro	21	(United States) CP Racing	Mercedes-AMG GT3 Evo	8:23.930	8:27.361	
32	SP 9 Pro	44	(Germany) Falken Motorsports	Porsche 911 GT3 R	8:16.260	8:15.132^{1}	
33	SP X	117	(Austria) KTM True Racing	KTM X-Bow GT2 Concept	8:25.617	No time	
34	SP X	706	(United States) Glickenhaus Racing	Scuderia Cameron Glickenhaus SCG004c	8:17.937	No time	
35	SP 9 Pro	1	(Germany) Manthey Racing	Porsche 911 GT3 R	8:17.591		No time^{2}
36	SP 9 Pro-Am	100	(Germany) Walkenhorst Motorsport	BMW M4 GT3	8:41.814	No time^{3}	

- ^1 The #44 Falken Motorsports received a 5-place grid penalty for overtaking under yellow flag.
- ^2 The #1 Manthey Racing was required to start the race from the back of the starting group for exceeding double yellow flag speed limit.
- ^3 The #100 Walkenhorst Motorsport was required to start the race from the back of the starting group for exceeding Code 60 speed limit.

=== Starting Group 2 ===
Pos.	Class	No.	Team	Car	Fastest lap from Qualifying 1, 2 and 3
1	Cup2	128	(Germany) Frikadelli Racing Team	Porsche 992 GT3 Cup	8:33.587
2	Cup2	127	(Germany) KKrämer Racing	Porsche 992 GT3 Cup	8:34.253
3	Cup2	123	(Germany) Black Falcon	Porsche 992 GT3 Cup	8:36.763
4	Cup2	132	(Germany) IronForce Racing by Phoenix	Porsche 992 GT3 Cup	8:37.308
5	Cup2	131	(Belgium) Mühlner Motorsport	Porsche 992 GT3 Cup	8:39.470
6	CupX	161	(Germany) Teichmann Racing GTX	KTM X-Bow GTX Concept	8:40.143
7	AT	13	(Germany) Fly&Help	Dodge Viper Competition Coupe GT3	8:44.876
8	CupX	162	(Germany) Teichmann Racing GTX	KTM X-Bow GTX Concept	8:50.209
9	Cup2	126	(United States) Krohn Racing	Porsche 992 GT3 Cup	8:50.652
10	SP 10	82	(Germany) PROsport Racing	Aston Martin Vantage AMR GT4	8:52.638
11	AT	320	(Germany) Four Motors	Porsche 991 GT3 II Cup	8:53.131
12	SP 8T	95	(Germany) Dörr Motorsport	Aston Martin Vantage AMR GT4	8:54.575
13	SP 10	83	(Germany) Toyo Tires with TGR Ring Racing	Toyota GR Supra GT4	9:00.016
14	Cup3	263	(Germany) FK Performance Motorsport	Porsche 718 Cayman GT4 Clubsport	9:00.225
15	TCR	811	(Germany) Max Kruse Racing	Audi RS3 LMS TCR (2017)	9:01.492
16	SP 10	78	(Germany) FK Performance Motorsport	BMW M4 GT4	9:01.971
17	TCR	831	(South Korea) Hyundai Motorsport N	Hyundai i30 N TCR	9:02.642
18	CupX	163	(Germany) Teichmann Racing GT4	KTM X-Bow GT4	9:03.011
19	SP 10	84	(Germany) Toyo Tires with TGR Ring Racing	Toyota GR Supra GT4	9:04.522
20	Cup3	257	(Germany) Team Sorg Rennsport	Porsche 718 Cayman GT4 Clubsport	9:04.663
21	Cup3	264	(Germany) Schmickler Performance powered by Ravenol	Porsche 718 Cayman GT4 Clubsport	9:05.151
22	SP 10	79	(Belgium) JJ Motorsport	BMW M4 GT4	9:06.401
23	AT	86	(Japan) Toyota Gazoo Racing Europe United	Toyota GR Supra GT4	9:07.160
24	TCR	833	(Germany) Bonk Motorsport	CUPRA León Competición TCR	9:07.738
25	Cup3	253	(Germany) G-Tech Competition	Porsche 718 Cayman GT4 Clubsport	9:09.380
26	SP 8T	80	(Germany) PROsport Racing	Aston Martin Vantage AMR GT4	9:10.007
27	Cup3	262	(Germany) Team Mathol Racing	Porsche 718 Cayman GT4 Clubsport	9:11.800
28	SP 7	70	(Germany) Huber Motorsport	Porsche 991 GT3 II Cup	9:12.128
29	Cup3	255	(Germany) KKrämer Racing UG	Porsche 718 Cayman GT4 Clubsport	9:12.272
30	Cup2	129	(United Kingdom) Moore International Motorsport	Porsche 992 GT3 Cup	9:13.262
31	AT	420	(Germany) Four Motors	Porsche 718 Cayman GT4 Clubsport	9:15.768
32	SP 10	69	(Germany) Dörr Motorsport	Aston Martin Vantage AMR GT4	9:18.012
33	Cup3	261	(Germany) Team Mathol Racing	Porsche 718 Cayman GT4 Clubsport	9:19.040
34	TCR	814	(Germany) mathilda racing	CUPRA León TCR	9:19.054
35	Cup3	254	(Germany) 9und11	Porsche 718 Cayman GT4 Clubsport	9:27.117
36	Cup3	250	(Germany) W&S Motorsport	Porsche 718 Cayman GT4 Clubsport	9:30.801
37	Cup3	252	(Germany) KKrämer Racing	Porsche 718 Cayman GT4 Clubsport	9:31.207
38	TCR	832	(Germany) asBest Racing	CUPRA León TCR	9:31.561
39	TCR	66	(Germany) MSC Emstal e.V. im ADAC	Volkswagen Golf GTI TCR	9:34.300
40	Cup3	251	(Germany) AVIA W&S Motorsport	Porsche 718 Cayman GT4 Clubsport	9:36.474
41	AT	633	(Germany) Four Motors	Porsche Cayman GT4 Clubsport MR	9:41.258
42	Cup3	256	(Germany) KKrämer Racing UG	Porsche 718 Cayman GT4 Clubsport	9:48.386
43	AT	109	(Germany) OVR Racing Cologne	Ford Mustang GT N24	9:53.964
44	Cup2	125	(Germany) Huber Motorsport	Porsche 992 GT3 Cup	8:48.141^{1}
45	TCR	830	(South Korea) Hyundai Motorsport N	Hyundai Elantra N TCR	No time^{2}
46	SP 8T	220	(Germany) Giti Tire Motorsport By WS Racing	BMW M4 GT4	9:13.798^{3}
47	SP 10	81	(Germany) PROsport Racing	Aston Martin Vantage AMR GT4	9:21.597^{4}
48	SP 8T	150	(Germany) Dörr Motorsport	Aston Martin Vantage AMR GT4	8:58.526^{5}
49	Cup2	135	(Germany) Clickversicherung Team	Porsche 992 GT3 Cup	8:43.746^{6}
50	Cup2	122	(Germany) Black Falcon	Porsche 992 GT3 Cup	8:51.696^{7}
-	CupX	160	(Germany) Teichmann Racing GTX	KTM X-Bow GTX Concept	8:33.277^{8}
-	Cup2	121	(Germany) Black Falcon Team IDENTICA	Porsche 992 GT3 Cup	8:40.052^{9}
-	SP 10	85	(Germany) Black Falcon Team TEXTAR	Porsche 718 Cayman GT4 RS Clubsport	9:33.028^{10}

- ^1 The #125 Huber Motorsport was required to start the race from the back of the starting group for exceeding Code 60 speed limit.
- ^2 All qualifying time by #830 Hyundai Motorsport N was cancelled for repeatedly exceeding speed limit.
- ^3 The #220 Giti Tire Motorsport By WS Racing was required to start the race from the back of the starting group for exceeding Code 60 speed limit.
- ^4 The #81 PROsport Racing was required to start the race from the back of the starting group for exceeding Code 60 speed limit.
- ^5 The #150 Dörr Motorsport was required to start the race from the back of the starting group for exceeding Code 60 speed limit.
- ^6 The #135 Clickversicherung Team was required to start the race from the back of the starting group for exceeding Code 60 speed limit.
- ^7 The #122 Black Falcon was required to start the race from the back of the starting group for exceeding Code 60 speed limit.
- ^8 The #160 Teichmann Racing GTX was required to start the race from pit lane after the starting group for repeatedly exceeding Code 60 speed limit.
- ^9 The #121 Black Falcon Team IDENTICA was required to start the race from pit lane after the starting group and received 2-minutes race penalty for repeatedly exceeding Code 60 speed limit.
- ^10 The #85 Black Falcon Team TEXTAR was required to start the race from pit lane after the starting group and received 2-minutes race penalty for repeatedly exceeding Code 60 speed limit.

=== Starting Group 3 ===
Pos.	Class	No.	Team	Car	Fastest lap from Qualifying 1, 2 and 3
1	SP 3T	114	(Japan) Subaru Tecnica International	Subaru WRX STI GT N24	9:01.904
2	SP 3T	10	(Germany) Max Kruse Racing	Volkswagen Golf GTI TCR	9:10.161
3	SP 6	200	(Switzerland) Hofor Racing	BMW M3 E46 GTR	9:12.122
4	SP 3T	310	(Germany) Max Kruse Racing	Volkswagen Golf GTI TCR	9:13.934
5	SP 3T	113	(Switzerland) Autorama Ag	SEAT León Cup Racer	9:23.585
6	Cup5	871	(Germany) Adrenalin Motorsport Team Alzner Automotive	BMW M2 ClubSport Racing	9:26.349
7	VT3	300	(Germany) Team Mathol Racing	Porsche 718 Cayman S	9:31.651
8	Cup5	880	(Germany) Schubert Motorsport	BMW M2 ClubSport Racing	9:33.248
9	SP 4T	718	(Germany) Racing Group Eifel by NEXEN TIRE Motorsport	Porsche 718 Cayman GT4 Clubsport	9:36.305
10	SP 4T	181		Porsche 718 Cayman GT4 Clubsport	9:38.070
11	M240i	240	(Germany) Adrenalin Motorsport Team Alzner Automotive	BMW M240i Racing	9:42.476
12	V6	396	(Germany) Adrenalin Motorsport Team Alzner Automotive	Porsche 981 Cayman S	9:45.431
13	M240i	245	(Germany) Schnitzelalm Racing	BMW M240i Racing	9:47.364
14	M240i	241	(Germany) Adrenalin Motorsport Team Alzner Automotive	BMW M240i Racing	9:47.403
15	V6	228	(Germany) Team Sorg Rennsport	Porsche Cayman S	9:52.743
16	VT2 Hecka	330	(Germany) Adrenalin Motorsport Team Alzner Automotive	BMW 330i Racing (2020)	9:52.989
17	SP 3	119	Toyota Gazoo Racing Team Thailand	Toyota Corolla Altis GT N24	9:53.005
18	VT2 Hecka	336	(Germany) FK Performance Motorsport	BMW 330i Racing (2020)	9:53.106
19	V6	397		Porsche 911	9:53.828
20	VT2 Front	332	(South Korea) Hyundai Driving Experience	Hyundai i30 Fastback N	9:59.056
21	V6	221	(Germany) Giti Tire Motorsport By WS Racing	Porsche Cayman	10:00.068
22	M240i	242	(Germany) Adrenalin Motorsport Team Alzner Automotive	BMW M240i Racing	10:03.094
23	VT2 Front	333	(Germany) DRUCKREGELT&WAPPLER by Mertens Motorsport MSC Adenau e.V. im ADAC	Hyundai i30 Fastback N	10:05.126
24	VT2 Hecka	226	(Germany) Team Sorg Rennsport	BMW 330i Racing (2020)	10:06.080
25	M240i	243	(Germany) mcchip-dkr	BMW M240i Racing	10:06.883
26	VT2 Hecka	334	(Germany) MSG Bayerischer Wald Hutthurm e.V. im ADAC	BMW 328i Racing	10:08.648
27	V5	444	(Germany) Adrenalin Motorsport Team Alzner Automotive	Porsche Cayman GT4 Clubsport MR	10:08.822
28	VT2 Front	223	(Germany) Giti Tire Motorsport By WS Racing	Volkswagen Golf VII GTI AU	10:09.192
29	M240i	246	(Switzerland) Hofor Racing by Bonk Motorsport	BMW M240i Racing	10:11.846
30	V4	324	(Germany) FK Performance	BMW 325i	10:12.481
31	VT2 Front	335	(Germany) MSC Adenau e.V. im ADAC	Renault Mégane III RS	10:17.048
32	SP 3T	112	(Germany) Bulldog Racing	MINI John Cooper Works GP	10:20.514
33	VT2 Hecka	224	(Germany) Team Sorg Rennsport	BMW 330i Racing (2020)	10:21.064
34	SP 3	120	Toyota Gazoo Racing Team Thailand	Toyota Corolla Altis GT N24	10:22.248
35	SP 3T	89	(Germany) Jung Motorsport	Opel Astra OPC Cup	10:25.654
36	VT2 Front	87	(Germany) Jung Motorsport	Opel Astra OPC	10:26.326
37	V4	322	(Germany) keeevin-racing.de MSC Wahlscheid e. V. im ADAC	BMW E90 325i	10:32.663
38	V4	323	(United Kingdom) Rockstar Games by Viken Motorsport & Tomcat	BMW 325i	10:39.498
39	VT2 Hecka	222	(Germany) Giti Tire Motorsport By WS Racing	BMW 328i Racing	10:49.118
40	VT2 Front	88	(Germany) Jung Motorsport	Opel Astra OPC	10:52.354
41	SP 3	143	(Germany) MSC Sinzig e.V. im ADAC	VW Golf 3 16V	10:59.124
42	SP 3	118	(Germany) Team mokoflex	Dacia Logan	11:41.428
43	SP 3	140	(Belgium) Pit Lane - AMC Sankt Vith	Toyota GT86 Cup	10:09.047^{1}
44	V6	227	(Germany) Team Sorg Rennsport	Porsche Cayman S	10:05.568^{2}
-	SP 3T	115	(Germany) MSC Sinzig e.V. im ADAC	Volkswagen Golf GTI TCR	9:53.567^{3}
-	VT2 Hecka	331	(Germany) Adrenalin Motorsport Team Alzner Automotive	BMW 330i Racing (2020)	9:57.384^{4}

- ^1 The #140 Pit Lane - AMC Sankt Vith was required to start the race from the back of the starting group for exceeding Code 60 speed limit.
- ^2 The #227 Team Sorg Rennsport was required to start the race from the back of the starting group for exceeding Code 60 speed limit.
- ^3 The #115 MSC Sinzig e.V. im ADAC was required to start the race from pit lane after the starting group for repeatedly exceeding Code 60 speed limit.
- ^4 The #331 Adrenalin Motorsport Team Alzner Automotive was required to start the race from pit lane after the starting group and received 2-minutes race penalty for repeatedly exceeding Code 60 speed limit.

== Race results ==
Pos	Class	No.	Team / Entrant	Drivers	Vehicle	Laps	Time/Retired
1	**SP 9 Pro**	**15**	**(Germany) Audi Sport Team Phoenix**	**(Netherlands) Robin Frijns (South Africa) Kelvin van der Linde (Belgium) Dries Vanthoor (Belgium) Frédéric Vervisch**	**Audi R8 LMS Evo II**	**159**	**24:07:13.822**
2	SP 9 Pro	3	(Germany) Mercedes-AMG Team GetSpeed BWT	(United Kingdom) Adam Christodoulou (Germany) Maximilian Götz (Germany) Fabian Schiller	Mercedes-AMG GT3 Evo	159	+23.276
3	SP 9 Pro	4	(Germany) Mercedes-AMG Team GetSpeed BWT	(Germany) Maro Engel (France) Jules Gounon (Spain) Daniel Juncadella	Mercedes-AMG GT3 Evo	159	+3:33.519
4	SP 9 Pro	22	(Germany) Audi Sport Team Car Collection	(Germany) Christopher Haase (Switzerland) Nico Müller (Switzerland) Patric Niederhauser (Germany) René Rast	Audi R8 LMS Evo II	159	+4:40.864
5	SP 9 Pro	16	(Germany) Scherer Sport Team Phoenix	(Italy) Michele Beretta (Poland) Jakub Giermaziak (Germany) Kim-Luis Schramm (Germany) Markus Winkelhock	Audi R8 LMS Evo II	159	+6:53.468
6	SP 9 Pro	24	(Germany) Audi Sport Team Lionspeed by Car Collection	(Italy) Mattia Drudi (Germany) Patrick Kolb (Germany) Christopher Mies (Switzerland) Patric Niederhauser	Audi R8 LMS Evo II	159	+7:01.159
7	SP 9 Pro	12	(Germany) Mercedes-AMG Team Bilstein by HRT	(Switzerland) Philip Ellis (Switzerland) Raffaele Marciello (Germany) Luca Stolz	Mercedes-AMG GT3 Evo	158	+1 Lap
8	SP 9 Pro-Am	6	(Germany) Mercedes-AMG Team Bilstein by HRT	(Germany) Nico Bastian (Germany) Hubert Haupt (Italy) Gabriele Piana (Germany) Marvin Dienst	Mercedes-AMG GT3 Evo	158	+1 Lap
9	SP 9 Pro	33	(Germany) Falken Motorsports	(New Zealand) Jaxon Evans (Germany) Sven Müller (France) Patrick Pilet (Germany) Marco Seefried	Porsche 911 GT3 R	157	+2 Laps
10	SP 9 Pro-Am	7	(Austria) Konrad Motorsport	(Germany) Maximilian Hackländer (Zimbabwe) Axcil Jefferies (Germany) Michele Di Martino (South Africa) Jordan Pepper	Lamborghini Huracán GT3 Evo	156	+3 Laps
11	SP 9 Pro-Am	25	(Germany) Huber Motorsport	(Germany) Lars Kern (Germany) Nico Menzel (Germany) Klaus Rader (Germany) Joachim Thyssen	Porsche 911 GT3 R	156	+3 Laps
12	**SP-X**	**706**	**(United States) Glickenhaus Racing**	**(Germany) Felipe Fernández Laser (Germany) Thomas Mutsch (France) Franck Mailleux (United Kingdom) Richard Westbrook**	**Scuderia Cameron Glickenhaus SCG004c**	**155**	**+4 Laps**
13	SP 9 Pro-Am	23	(Germany) Lionspeed by Car Collection Motorsport	(Germany) Dennis Fetzer (Germany) Klaus Koch (Germany) Dennis Marschall (Austria) Simon Reicher	Audi R8 LMS Evo II	154	+5 Laps
14	SP 9 Pro-Am	11	(Netherlands) Twin Busch by Team Équipe-Vitesse	(Germany) Elia Erhart (Germany) Michael Heimrich (Germany) Pierre Kaffer (Germany) Arno Klasen	Audi R8 LMS Evo II	153	+6 Laps
15	**Cup2**	**127**	**(Germany) KKrämer Racing**	**(Germany) Christopher Brück (Germany) Karsten Krämer (Germany) Moritz Kranz (Germany) Alexej Veremenko**	**Porsche 992 GT3 Cup**	**151**	**+8 Laps**
16	Cup2	123	(Germany) Black Falcon	(Germany) Ben Bünnagel (Turkey) Mustafa Mehmet Kaya (Italy) Gabriele Piana (Germany) Mike Stursberg	Porsche 992 GT3 Cup	151	+8 Laps
17	SP 9 Pro-Am	21	(United States) CP Racing	(United States) Charles Espenlaub (United States) Joe Foster (United States) Shane Lewis (United States) Charles Putman	Mercedes-AMG GT3 Evo	147	+12 Laps
18	**TCR**	**830**	**(South Korea) Hyundai Motorsport N**	**(Spain) Mikel Azcona (Germany) Marc Basseng (Germany) Manuel Lauck**	**Hyundai Elantra N TCR**	**145**	**+14 Laps**
19	**SP 10**	**78**	**(Germany) FK Performance Motorsport**	**(United Kingdom) Ben Green (Germany) Marcel Lenerz (France) Thomas Neubauer (Germany) Michael Schrey**	**BMW M4 GT4**	**144**	**+15 Laps**
20	SP-X	117	(Austria) KTM True Racing	(Austria) Reinhard Kofler (Finland) Markus Palttala (Austria) Ferdinand Stuck (Austria) Johannes Stuck	KTM X-Bow GT2 Concept	144	+15 Laps
21	**Cup3**	**264**	**(Germany) Schmickler Performance powered by Ravenol**	**(Switzerland) Mauro Calamia (Switzerland) Ivan Jacoma (Switzerland) Roberto Pampanini (Germany) Kai Riemer**	**Porsche 718 Cayman GT4 Clubsport**	**144**	**+15 Laps**
22	**SP 8T**	**95**	**(Germany) Dörr Motorsport**	**(Netherlands) Indy Dontje (Germany) Phil Dörr (Germany) Nick Hancke (Germany) Moritz Wiskirchen**	**Aston Martin Vantage AMR GT4**	**143**	**+16 Laps**
23	Cup2	131	(Belgium) Mühlner Motorsport	(Germany) Marcel Hoppe (Germany) Thorsten Jung (Germany) Michael Rebhan (Germany) Nick Saleswky	Porsche 992 GT3 Cup	143	+16 Laps
24	Cup3	253	(Germany) G-Tech Competition	(Germany) Daniel Blickle (Germany) Fabio Grosse (Switzerland) Patrick Grütter (Germany) Herbert Lösch	Porsche 718 Cayman GT4 Clubsport	143	+16 Laps
25	SP 10	82	(Germany) PROsport Racing	(Switzerland) Miklas Born (Germany) Christoph Breuer (Germany) Alexander Mies (Germany) Mike David Ortmann	Aston Martin Vantage AMR GT4	143	+16 Laps
26	Cup2	135	(Germany) Clickversicherung Team	(Germany) Robin Chrzanowski (Germany) Kersten Jodexnis (Germany) Max Koch (New Zealand) Peter Scharmach	Porsche 992 GT3 Cup	142	+17 Laps
27	Cup3	263	(Germany) FK Performance Motorsport	(Germany) Jens Moetefindt (Germany) Florian Naumann (Germany) Moritz Oberheim (Germany) Torsten Wolter	Porsche 718 Cayman GT4 Clubsport	142	+17 Laps
28	Cup3	257	(Germany) Team Sorg Rennsport	(Germany) Stefan Beyer (Germany) Heiko Eichenberg (Germany) Fidel Leib (Germany) Björn Simon	Porsche 718 Cayman GT4 Clubsport	142	+17 Laps
29	**SP 7**	**70**	**(Germany) Huber Motorsport**	**(Germany) Ulrich Berg (Germany) Rodriguez Menzl (Germany) Philip Hamprecht**	**Porsche 991 GT3 II Cup**	**142**	**+17 Laps**
30	Cup2	132	(Germany) IronForce Racing by Phoenix	(Germany) Luca Engstler (Germany) Leon Köhler (Germany) Timo Scheider (Germany) Jan-Erik Slooten	Porsche 992 GT3 Cup	141	+18 Laps
31	TCR	831	(South Korea) Hyundai Motorsport N	(Finland) Antti Buri (Germany) Moritz Oestreich (France) Jean-Karl Vernay	Hyundai i30 N TCR	141	+18 Laps
32	Cup3	254	(Germany) 9und11	(Germany) Leonard Oehme (Germany) Moritz Oehme (Germany) Niklas Oehme (Germany) Ralf Oehme	Porsche 718 Cayman GT4 Clubsport	140	+19 Laps
33	SP 8T	150	(Germany) Dörr Motorsport	(Germany) Michael Funke (Germany) Christian Gebhardt (Germany) Peter Rosavac (Germany) Rolf Scheibner	Aston Martin Vantage AMR GT4	140	+19 Laps
34	SP 10	69	(Germany) Dörr Motorsport	(Germany) Finn Albig (Germany) Stefan Kenntemich (Germany) Dierk Möller (Germany) Frank Weishar	Aston Martin Vantage AMR GT4	140	+19 Laps
35	SP 8T	220	(Germany) Giti Tire Motorsport By WS Racing	(United Kingdom) Pippa Mann (France) Célia Martin (Germany) Carrie Schreiner (Liechtenstein) Fabienne Wohlwend	BMW M4 GT4	139	+20 Laps
36	Cup3	262	(Germany) Team Mathol Racing	(Germany) Daniel Bohr (Belgium) Tom Cloet (Germany) Heinz Dolfen (Germany) Oliver Louisoder	Porsche 718 Cayman GT4 Clubsport	139	+20 Laps
37	TCR	833	(Germany) Bonk Motorsport	(Germany) Hermann Bock (Germany) Michael Fischer (Germany) Max Partl (Switzerland) Alex Prinz	CUPRA León Competición TCR	139	+20 Laps
38	Cup3	250	(Germany) W&S Motorsport	(Germany) Dirk Biermann (Germany) Axel Duffner (Germany) René Höber (Germany) Jürgen Vöhringer	Porsche 718 Cayman GT4 Clubsport	139	+20 Laps
39	SP 10	79	(Belgium) JJ Motorsport	(Belgium) Hakan Sari (Belgium) Recep Sari (Turkey) Ersin Yücesan	BMW M4 GT4	138	+21 Laps
40	TCR	814	(Germany) mathilda racing	(Germany) Joachim Nett (Germany) Jürgen Nett (Austria) Lukas Niedertscheider (Germany) Michael Paatz	CUPRA León TCR	138	+21 Laps
41	**AT**	**320**	**(Germany) Four Motors**	**(Luxembourg) Charles Kauffman (Germany) Thomas Kiefer (Germany) Thomas von Löwis of Menar (Germany) "Smudo"**	**Porsche 991 GT3 II Cup**	**136**	**+23 Laps**
42	**SP 3T**	**113**	**(Switzerland) Autorama Ag**	**(Switzerland) Armando Stanco (Switzerland) Dario Stanco (Switzerland) Luigi Stanco**	**SEAT León Cup Racer**	**136**	**+23 Laps**
43	SP 10	83	(Germany) Toyo Tires with TGR Ring Racing	(Germany) Andreas Gülden (Germany) Michael Tischner (Germany) Heiko Tönges	Toyota GR Supra GT4	136	+23 Laps
44	**VT2 Hecka**	**330**	**(Germany) Adrenalin Motorsport Team Alzner Automotive**	**(Germany) Jacob Erlbacher (Germany) Daniel Zils (Germany) Christopher Rink (Germany) Oskar Sandberg**	**BMW 330i Racing (2020)**	**133**	**+26 Laps**
45	Cup3	251	(Germany) AVIA W&S Motorsport	(Switzerland) Benedikt Frei (Switzerland) Viktor Schyrba (Switzerland) Markus Zünd (Switzerland) Urs Zünd	Porsche 718 Cayman GT4 Clubsport	133	+26 Laps
46	VT2 Hecka	336	(Germany) FK Performance Motorsport	(Germany) Danny Brink (Germany) Christian Konnerth (Switzerland) Ranko Mijatovic (Germany) Florian Quante	BMW 330i Racing (2020)	133	+26 Laps
47	SP 9 Pro-Am	102	(Germany) Walkenhorst Motorsport	(Germany) Mario von Bohlen (Germany) Jörg Müller (Germany) Jörn Schmidt-Staade (United Kingdom) Ben Tuck	BMW M4 GT3	133	+26 Laps
48	**Cup5**	**880**	**(Germany) Schubert Motorsport**	**(Japan) Takayuki Kinoshita (Germany) Torsten Schubert (Germany) Stefan von Zabiensky (Germany) Michael von Zabiensky**	**BMW M2 ClubSport Racing**	**132**	**+27 Laps**
49	TCR	66	(Germany) MSC Emstal e.V. im ADAC	(Germany) Peter Elkmann (Italy) Daniel Fink (Italy) Florian Haller (Germany) Sebastian Schemmann	Volkswagen Golf GTI TCR	132	+27 Laps
50	Cup2	125	(Germany) Huber Motorsport	(Germany) Stefan Aust (Germany) Christian Bollrath (Germany) Jacob Schell (Germany) Hans Wehrmann	Porsche 992 GT3 Cup	132	+27 Laps
51	**M240i**	**240**	**(Germany) Adrenalin Motorsport Team Alzner Automotive**	**(Germany) Sven Markert (Germany) Sascha Padulovic (Germany) Zoran Padulovic (Germany) Robin Reimer**	**BMW M240i Racing**	**131**	**+28 Laps**
52	AT	633	(Germany) Four Motors	(Switzerland) Nicola Bravetti (Germany) Karl Pflanz (Switzerland) Ivan Reggiani (Switzerland) Marco Timbal	Porsche Cayman GT4 Clubsport MR	131	+28 Laps
53	SP 3T	310	(Germany) Max Kruse Racing	(Turkey) Emir Asari (United States) Andrew Engelmann (Switzerland) Jasmin Preisig (Brazil) Gustavo Xavier	Volkswagen Golf GTI TCR	131	+28 Laps
54	VT2 Hecka	226	(Germany) Team Sorg Rennsport	(Germany) Nicolas Griebner (Mexico) Luis Ramirez (Germany) Daniel Niermann (Germany) Kevin Warum	BMW 330i Racing (2020)	130	+29 Laps
55	Cup2	129	(United Kingdom) Moore International Motorsport	(Germany) Peter Bonk (Germany) Bill Cameron (United Kingdom) Jim Cameron	Porsche 992 GT3 Cup	130	+29 Laps
56	**SP 4T**	**718**	**(Germany) Racing Group Eifel by NEXEN TIRE Motorsport**	**(Germany) Christian Dannesberger (Germany) Norbert Fischer (Germany) Fabian Peitzmeier (Germany) Ralf Zensen**	**Porsche 718 Cayman GT4 Clubsport**	**129**	**+30 Laps**
57	SP 3T	10	(Germany) Max Kruse Racing	(Germany) Heiko Hammel (Germany) Marek Schaller (Switzerland) Frédéric Yerly (Germany) Matthias Wasel	Volkswagen Golf GTI TCR	129	+30 Laps
58	**CupX**	**161**	**(Germany) Teichmann Racing GTX**	**(Germany) Stephan Brodmerkel (Austria) Laura Kraihamer (Austria) Constantin Schöll (Germany) Henrik Still**	**KTM X-Bow GTX Concept**	**129**	**+30 Laps**
59	**V5**	**444**	**(Germany) Adrenalin Motorsport Team Alzner Automotive**	**(Spain) Carlos Arimón (Germany) Daniel Korn (Germany) Tobias Korn (Germany) Ulrich Korn**	**Porsche Cayman GT4 Clubsport MR**	**129**	**+30 Laps**
60	M240i	241	(Germany) Adrenalin Motorsport Team Alzner Automotive	(Germany) Thomas Ardelt (Germany) Manuel Dormagen (Germany) Sven Oepen (Germany) Simon Klemund	BMW M240i Racing	127	+32 Laps
61	Cup3	256	(Germany) KKrämer Racing UG	(Germany) Olaf Baunack (Luxembourg) Sebastien Carcone (Germany) Heiko Gros (Germany) Sabrina Gros	Porsche 718 Cayman GT4 Clubsport	127	+32 Laps
62	**V6**	**397**		**(Germany) Alexander Köppen (Germany) Lukas Pickard (Luxembourg) Alain Pier (Germany) Sebastian Rings**	**Porsche 911**	**127**	**+32 Laps**
63	M240i	246	(Switzerland) Hofor Racing by Bonk Motorsport	(Germany) Michael Bonk (Germany) Bernd Küpper (Germany) Jürgen Meyer (Germany) Thomas Mühlenz	BMW M240i Racing	126	+33 Laps
64	V6	228	(Germany) Team Sorg Rennsport	(Switzerland) Caryl Fritsche (Denmark) Rasmus Helmich (Monaco) Xavier Lamadrid (France) Fabrice Reicher	Porsche Cayman S	126	+33 Laps
65	AT	86	(Japan) Toyota Gazoo Racing Europe United	(Germany) Adrian Brusius (Hungary) Adam Lengyel (Germany) Lars Peucker (Germany) Finn Unteroberdörster	Toyota GR Supra GT4	126	+33 Laps
66	**SP 6**	**200**	**(Switzerland) Hofor Racing**	**(Switzerland) Martin Kroll (Switzerland) Michael Kroll (Switzerland) Alexander Prinz (Switzerland) Chantal Prinz**	**BMW M3 E46 GTR**	**124**	**+35 Laps**
67	VT2 Hecka	224	(Germany) Team Sorg Rennsport	(Germany) Heinz Jürgen Kroner (Germany) Olaf Meyer (Germany) Hans Joachim Theiss (Austria) Bernhard Wagner	BMW 330i Racing (2020)	124	+35 Laps
68	**V4**	**323**	**(United Kingdom) Rockstar Games by Viken Motorsport & Tomcat**	**(Germany) Markus Löw (United Kingdom) Benjamin Lyons (Germany) Dale Lomas**	**BMW E90 325i**	**123**	**+36 Laps**
69	SP 3T	115	(Germany) MSC Sinzig e.V. im ADAC	(Armenia) Artur Goroyan (Germany) Arndt Hallmanns (Germany) Christian Meurer (Germany) Rudi Speich	Volkswagen Golf GTI TCR	122	+37 Laps
70	**VT2 Front**	**223**	**(Germany) Giti Tire Motorsport By WS Racing**	**(Germany) Robert Hinzer (Germany) Axel Jahn (Germany) Ulrich Schmidt (Germany) Lutz Wolzenburg**	**Volkswagen Golf VII GTI AU**	**122**	**+37 Laps**
71	VT2 Front	87	(Germany) Jung Motorsport	(Germany) Michael Eichhorn (Germany) Daniel Jenichen (Germany) Tobias Jung (Germany) Volker Strycek	Opel Astra OPC	121	+38 Laps
72	VT2 Front	333	(Germany) DRUCKREGELT&WAPPLER by Mertens Motorsport MSC Adenau e.V. im ADAC	(Germany) Stefan Endres (Germany) Daniel Mertens (United States) Jeff Ricca (Germany) Kurt Strube	Hyundai i30 Fastback N	121	+38 Laps
73	V6	227	(Germany) Team Sorg Rennsport	(Italy) Alberto Carobbio (Germany) Cesar Mendieta (Germany) Reinhard Schmiechel (Italy) Ugo Vicenzi	Porsche Cayman S	120	+39 Laps
74	V4	324	(Germany) FK Performance	(Germany) Jürgen Huber (Germany) Christian Knötschke (Germany) Maximilian Kurz (Germany) Simon Sagmeister	BMW 325i	120	+39 Laps
75	**SP 3**	**120**	**Toyota Gazoo Racing Team Thailand**	**(Taiwan) Chen Jian Hong (Japan) Naoki Kawamura (Thailand) Grant Supaphongs**	**Toyota Corolla Altis GT N24**	**118**	**+41 Laps**
76	VT2 Hecka	334	(Germany) MSG Bayerischer Wald Hutthurm e.V. im ADAC	(Germany) Jörg Schönfelder (Germany) Christian Schotte (Germany) Serge Van Vooren	BMW 328i Racing	118	+41 Laps
77	SP 3	119	Toyota Gazoo Racing Team Thailand	(Thailand) Suttipong Smittachartch (Thailand) Nattavude Charoensukhawatana (Thailand) Manat Kulapalanont (Thailand) Nattapong Hortongkum	Toyota Corolla Altis GT N24	115	+44 Laps
78	SP 3	143	(Germany) MSC Sinzig e.V. im ADAC	(Germany) Carsten Erpenbach (Germany) Raphael Klingmann (Germany) Ralph Liesenfeld (Germany) Philipp Eis	VW Golf 3 16V	115	+44 Laps
79	SP 3T	89	(Germany) Jung Motorsport	(Portugal) Carlos Antunes Tavares (France) Jean Marc Finot (France) Jean Philippe Imparato (France) Francois Wales	Opel Astra OPC Cup	113	+46 Laps
80	SP 3	140	(Belgium) Pit Lane - AMC Sankt Vith	(Belgium) Jacques Derenne (Belgium) Kurt Dujardyn (Belgium) Oliver Muytjens (Belgium) "Brody"	Toyota GT86 Cup	109	+50 Laps
81	VT2 Front	335	(Germany) MSC Adenau e.V. im ADAC	(Germany) David Ackermann (Germany) Holger Gachot (Germany) Dirk Vleugels (Germany) "Moritz"	Renault Mégane III RS	108	+51 Laps
82	AT	109	(Germany) OVR Racing Cologne	(Germany) Ralph Caba (Germany) Michael Mohr (Germany) Oliver Sprungmann	Ford Mustang GT N24	107	+52 Laps
83	VT2 Front	332	(South Korea) Hyundai Driving Experience	(Germany) Michael Bohrer (Germany) Stephan Epp (Germany) Gerrit Holthaus (Germany) Marcus Willhardt	Hyundai i30 Fastback N	105	+54 Laps
84	**VT3**	**300**	**(Germany) Team Mathol Racing**	**(Argentina) Marcos Adolfo Vazquez (Germany) Matthias Trinius (Germany) Thorsten Held (Germany) Max Walter von Bär**	**Porsche 718 Cayman S**	**101**	**+58 Laps**
85	Cup3	255	(Germany) KKrämer Racing UG	(Germany) Simon Eibl (Germany) Alexander Kroker (Germany) John-Lee Schambony (Germany) Tobias Wolf	Porsche 718 Cayman GT4 Clubsport	101	+58 Laps
86	M240i	242	(Germany) Adrenalin Motorsport Team Alzner Automotive	(Spain) Guillermo Aso (Spain) Alvaro Fontes (Germany) Harald Leppert (Germany) Ronny Leppert	BMW M240i Racing	100	+59 Laps
87	VT2 Hecka	331	(Germany) Adrenalin Motorsport Team Alzner Automotive	(Switzerland) Michelangelo Comazzi (Germany) Frank Haack (Germany) Philipp Leisen (Switzerland) Guido Wirtz	BMW 330i Racing (2020)	99	+60 Laps
88	SP 3	118	(Germany) Team mokoflex	(Germany) Jürgen Bussmann (Germany) Oliver Kriese (Germany) Michael Lachmeyer (Germany) Yannik Lachmeyer	Dacia Logan	92	+67 Laps
89	VT2 Front	88	(Germany) Jung Motorsport	(Germany) Lars Füting (Germany) Dr. Volker Kühn (Germany) Tim Robertz (Germany) Andreas Winterwerber	Opel Astra OPC	91	+68 Laps
90	V4	322	(Germany) keeevin-racing.de MSC Wahlscheid e. V. im ADAC	(Sweden) Dan Berghult (Germany) Frank Blass (Switzerland) Juha Miettinnen	BMW E90 325i	87	+72 Laps
91	Cup5	871	(Germany) Adrenalin Motorsport Team Alzner Automotive	(France) Philippe Haezebrouck (Germany) Roland Froese (Japan) Ryusho Konishi (Germany) Alexander Müller	BMW M2 ClubSport Racing	83	+76 Laps
92	VT2 Hecka	222	(Germany) Giti Tire Motorsport By WS Racing	(Germany) Mathias Möller (New Zealand) Wayne Moore (Germany) Fabian Pirrone (Germany) Detlef Stelbrink	BMW 328i Racing	81	+78 Laps
93	SP 10	84	(Germany) Toyo Tires with TGR Ring Racing	(Germany) Lance David Arnold (Germany) Tobias Vazquez-Garcia (Germany) Janis Waldow	Toyota GR Supra GT4	79	+80 Laps
DNF	SP 9 Pro	20	(Germany) Schubert Motorsport	(Germany) Jens Klingmann (Finland) Jesse Krohn (Germany) Niklas Krütten (United Kingdom) Alexander Sims	BMW M4 GT3	153	Overheating engine
DNF	SP 9 Pro	18	(Hong Kong) KCMG	(New Zealand) Earl Bamber (Norway) Dennis Olsen (United Kingdom) Nick Tandy	Porsche 911 GT3 R	149	Suffered a technical issue
DNF	SP 9 Pro-Am	55	(Germany) Mercedes-AMG Mann-Filter Team Landgraf	(Germany) Patrick Assenheimer (Switzerland) Julien Apothéloz (Austria) Dominik Baumann (Germany) Luca-Sandro Trefz	Mercedes-AMG GT3 Evo	143	
DNF	M240i	243	(Germany) mcchip-dkr	(Germany) Sascha Hancke (Germany) Lucas Lange (Germany) Sascha Lott (Germany) Alexander Meixner	BMW M240i Racing	123	
DNF	TCR	811	(Germany) Max Kruse Racing	(Denmark) Peter Hansen (Germany) Benjamin Leuchter (Denmark) Lars Nielsen	Audi RS3 LMS TCR (2017)	118	
DNF	Cup3	252	(Germany) KKrämer Racing	(United States) Jean-Francois Brunot (Germany) Henning Cramer (United States) Andreas Gabler (Netherlands) Jan Jaap van Roon	Porsche 718 Cayman GT4 Clubsport	117	
DNF	SP 9 Pro-Am	14	(Germany) Hella Pagid - racing one	(Netherlands) Jeroen Bleekemolen (Australia) Nick Foster (Germany) Christian Kohlhaas (Netherlands) Jules Szymkowiak	Ferrari 488 GT3	103	
NC	SP 10	85	(Germany) Black Falcon Team TEXTAR	(Germany) Martin Meenen (Germany) Marco Müller (Germany) Carsten Palluth (Germany) Tobias Wahl	Porsche 718 Cayman GT4 RS Clubsport	99	+60 Laps
DNF	Cup2	122	(Germany) Black Falcon	(United States) Peter Ludwig (Germany) Noah Nagelsdiek (Germany) Maik Rosenberg (Germany) Reinhold Renger	Porsche 992 GT3 Cup	98	
DNF	Cup2	121	(Germany) Black Falcon Team IDENTICA	(Netherlands) Paul Harkema (Germany) Tobias Müller (Germany) Noah Nagelsdiek (Germany) Tim Scheerbarth	Porsche 992 GT3 Cup	97	
DNF	CupX	162	(Germany) Teichmann Racing GTX	(Germany) Dirk Adorf (Switzerland) Manuel Amweg (Germany) Tim Sandtler (Germany) Florian Wolf	KTM X-Bow GTX Concept	91	
DNF	SP 10	81	(Germany) PROsport Racing	(Belgium) Guido Dumarey (Germany) Michael Hess (Ukraine) Yevgen Sokolovsky (Switzerland) Alexander Walker	Aston Martin Vantage AMR GT4	89	
DNF	SP 9 Pro	72	(Germany) BMW Junior Team Shell	(United Kingdom) Daniel Harper (Germany) Max Hesse (United States) Neil Verhagen	BMW M4 GT3	86	Accident
DNF	SP 9 Pro	28	(Italy) Dinamic Motorsport	(Italy) Matteo Cairoli (Germany) Christian Engelhart (France) Côme Ledogar (Austria) Thomas Preining	Porsche 911 GT3 R	85	Accident
DNF	Cup3	261	(Germany) Team Mathol Racing	(United Kingdom) Peter Cate (New Zealand) Tony Richards (Switzerland) Rüdiger Schicht (Germany) "Montana"	Porsche 718 Cayman GT4 Clubsport	85	
DNF	SP 9 Pro	26	(Switzerland) Octane126 Serliana	(Germany) Björn Grossmann (Switzerland) Jonathan Hirschi (Germany) Luca Ludwig (Switzerland) Simon Trummer	Ferrari 488 GT3 Evo 2020	82	
DNF	CupX	163	(Germany) Teichmann Racing GT4	(Germany) Phil Hill (Germany) Michael Mönch (Germany) Andreas Tasche (Germany) "Maximilian"	KTM X-Bow GT4	78	
NC	V6	396	(Germany) Adrenalin Motorsport Team Alzner Automotive	(Germany) Christian Büllesbach (Germany) Guido Heinrich (Germany) Stefan Kruse (Germany) Andreas Schettler	Porsche 981 Cayman S	77	+82 Laps
DNF	SP-X	116	(Austria) KTM True Racing	(Germany) Tim Heinemann (Austria) Max Hofer (Austria) Reinhard Kofler (Norway) Mads Siljehaug	KTM X-Bow GT2 Concept	68	
DNF	Cup2	126	(United States) Krohn Racing	(Germany) Mario Farnbacher (Netherlands) Patrick Huisman (Sweden) Nic Jönsson (United States) Tracy Krohn	Porsche 992 GT3 Cup	66	
DNF	SP 8T	80	(Germany) PROsport Racing	(Belgium) Simon Balcaen (Belgium) Guillaume Dumarey (Belgium) Maxime Dumarey (Belgium) Jean Glorieux	Aston Martin Vantage AMR GT4	66	
DNF	SP 9 Pro	101	(Germany) Walkenhorst Motorsport	(Norway) Christian Krognes (Germany) Jörg Müller (Spain) Andy Soucek (Finland) Sami-Matti Trogen	BMW M4 GT3	64	Technical
DNF	SP 3T	114	(Japan) Subaru Tecnica International	(Netherlands) Carlo van Dam (Germany) Marcel Lasée (Japan) Kota Sasaki (Germany) Tim Schrick	Subaru WRX STI GT N24	64	Front wheels and suspension arm of the right rear wheel
DNF	AT	13	(Germany) Fly&Help	(Germany) Bernd Albrecht (Germany) Sebastian Asch (Germany) Kurt Ecke (Germany) Andreas Sczepansky	Dodge Viper Competition Coupe GT3	63	
DNF	Cup2	128	(Germany) Frikadelli Racing Team	(Germany) Klaus Abbelen (Germany) Hendrik von Danwitz (Turkey) Ayhancan Güven (United Kingdom) Julian Harrison	Porsche 992 GT3 Cup	62	
DNF	V6	221	(Germany) Giti Tire Motorsport By WS Racing	(United Kingdom) David Drinkwater (Denmark) Nicolai Kandborg (Germany) Niklas Kry (Germany) Nils Steinberg	Porsche Cayman	62	
DNF	SP 9 Pro	44	(Germany) Falken Motorsports	(Austria) Klaus Bachler (Belgium) Alessio Picariello (France) Patrick Pilet (Austria) Martin Ragginger	Porsche 911 GT3 R	58	Accident
DNF	TCR	832	(Germany) asBest Racing	(Germany) Davide Dehren (Germany) Klaus-Dieter Frommer (Germany) Daniel Jolk	CUPRA León TCR	58	
DNF	SP 9 Pro	5	(Germany) Scherer Sport Team Phoenix	(Switzerland) Ricardo Feller (Germany) Vincent Kolb (South Africa) Kelvin van der Linde (Germany) Frank Stippler	Audi R8 LMS Evo II	57	
DNF	SP 9 Pro	98	(Germany) Rowe Racing	(Netherlands) Nicky Catsburg (United States) John Edwards (South Africa) Sheldon van der Linde (Germany) Marco Wittmann	BMW M4 GT3	47	Accident
DNF	SP 9 Pro	90	(United Kingdom) TF Sport AMR	(Belgium) Maxime Martin (United Kingdom) David Pittard (Denmark) Marco Sørensen (Denmark) Nicki Thiim	Aston Martin Vantage AMR GT3	45	Accident
DNF	SP 9 Pro-Am	34	(Germany) Schnitzelalm Racing	(Germany) Marek Böckmann (Germany) Kenneth Heyer (Switzerland) Yannick Mettler (Germany) Johannes Stengel	Mercedes-AMG GT3 Evo	44	
DNF	AT	420	(Germany) Four Motors	(Germany) Matthias Beckwermert (Denmark) Henrik Bollerslev (Germany) Christian Hewer (Netherlands) Marco van Ramshorst	Porsche 718 Cayman GT4 Clubsport	44	
DNF	SP 9 Pro-Am	100	(Germany) Walkenhorst Motorsport	(Germany) Friedrich von Bohlen (Germany) Jörg Breuer (Germany) Henry Walkenhorst (Germany) Andreas Ziegler	BMW M4 GT3	41	Technical
DNF	SP 3T	112	(Germany) Bulldog Racing	(Germany) Danny Brink (Germany) Jens Dralle (Germany) Markus Fischer (Germany) Uwe Krumscheid	MINI John Cooper Works GP	40	Accident
DNF	SP 4T	181		(Germany) Alexander Köppen (Germany) Jacek Pydys (Germany) Andreas Schaflitzl	Porsche 718 Cayman GT4 Clubsport	39	
DNF	CupX	160	(Germany) Teichmann Racing GTX	(Germany) Georg Griesemann (Germany) Felix von der Laden (Germany) Maik Rönnefarth (Germany) Yves Volte	KTM X-Bow GTX Concept	32	Fire
DNF	M240i	245	(Germany) Schnitzelalm Racing	(Germany) Marco Büsker (Germany) Björn Griesemann (Germany) Tim Neuser (United States) David Thilenius	BMW M240i Racing	31	
DNF	SP 9 Pro	1	(Germany) Manthey Racing	(Denmark) Michael Christensen (France) Kévin Estre (France) Frédéric Makowiecki (Belgium) Laurens Vanthoor	Porsche 911 GT3 R	22	Accident
DNF	SP 9 Pro	27	(Germany) Toksport WRT	(France) Julien Andlauer (Australia) Matt Campbell (France) Mathieu Jaminet	Porsche 911 GT3 R	18	Crashed
DNF	SP 9 Pro	99	(Germany) Rowe Racing	(Austria) Philipp Eng (Brazil) Augusto Farfus (United States) Connor De Phillippi (United Kingdom) Nick Yelloly	BMW M4 GT3	18	Suspension damage
DNF	SP 9 Pro	29	(Italy) Dinamic Motorsport	(Italy) Matteo Cairoli (Germany) Christian Engelhart (Belgium) Adrien De Leener (Denmark) Frederik Schandorff	Porsche 911 GT3 R	11	Accident

- Entries in **bold** are class winners.
- Drivers in italics were entered in cars that completed the race, however did not complete the required two laps to be classified as a finisher.

== Bibliography ==
- Jörg-Richard Ufer & Tim Upietz. 24 Stunden Nürburgring Nordschleife 2022. Gruppe C Motorsport Verlag. ISBN 978-3-948501-18-1.
