= 2020 24 Hours of Nürburgring =

Endurance motor race in Germany

Nürburgring 24h track (Nordschleife+GP Circuit without Mercedes-Arena)

The 2020 ADAC 24 Hours of Nürburgring (also known as ADAC Total 24h Race at the Nürburgring Nordschleife for sponsorship reasons) was the 48th running of the 24 Hours of Nürburgring. It took place on 24–27 September 2020. Although it was previously scheduled to held on 21–23 May, it was announced on 17 March that the race would be postponed to September due to the COVID-19 pandemic.

== Background ==
The 48th running of the 24 Hours of Nürburgring took place on 24–27 September 2020. It was previously scheduled to held on 21–23 May, but in March the race was postponed for the first time ever to September due to the COVID-19 pandemic. The qualifying race that is usually held in April was cancelled with no substitute. In July 2020 it was announced that the 24 Hours of Nurburgring would be held behind closed doors without spectators. However, just a week before the event a limited number of fans would be allowed to spectate. The 2020 World Touring Car Cup was a support race for the 24 hours.

== Entry list ==
No.	Entrant	Car	Driver 1	Driver 2	Driver 3	Driver 4
24H Special Classes
SP 9 FIA GT3 (31 entries)
1	(Germany) Audi Sport Team Phoenix	Audi R8 LMS Evo	(Switzerland) Nico Müller	(Germany) Frank Stippler	(Belgium) Dries Vanthoor	(Belgium) Frédéric Vervisch
2	(Germany) Mercedes-AMG Team HRT Bilstein	Mercedes-AMG GT3 Evo	(Netherlands) Yelmer Buurman	(Germany) Nico Bastian	(United Kingdom) Philip Ellis	(Germany) Hubert Haupt
3	(Germany) Audi Sport Team Car Collection	Audi R8 LMS Evo	(Italy) Mirko Bortolotti	(Netherlands) Robin Frijns (Note: Robin Frijns contracted flu. Although he recorded a negative COVID-19 test he was not allowed to participate in the rest of the meeting. No replacement driver was named.)	(Germany) Christopher Haase	(Germany) Markus Winkelhock
4	(Germany) Mercedes-AMG Team HRT	Mercedes-AMG GT3 Evo	(United Kingdom) Adam Christodoulou	(Germany) Maro Engel	(Switzerland) Manuel Metzger	(Germany) Luca Stolz
5	(Germany) Phoenix Racing	Audi R8 LMS Evo	(Italy) Michele Beretta	(France) Jules Gounon	(Germany) Kim-Luis Schramm	(Germany) Frank Stippler
6	(Germany) Mercedes-AMG Team HRT AutoArena	Mercedes-AMG GT3 Evo	(Germany) Patrick Assenheimer	(Austria) Dominik Baumann	(Germany) Maro Engel	(Germany) Dirk Müller
7	(Germany) Car Collection Motorsport	Audi R8 LMS Evo	(Netherlands) Milan Dontje	(Slovakia) Miroslav Konopka	(Switzerland) Patric Niederhauser	(Germany) Mike David Ortmann
8	(Germany) GetSpeed Performance	Mercedes-AMG GT3 Evo	(France) Emmanuel Collard	(Germany) Christer Jöns	(France) François Perrodo	(France) Matthieu Vaxivière
9	(Germany) Mercedes-AMG Team GetSpeed	Mercedes-AMG GT3 Evo	(Germany) Maximilian Buhk	(Germany) Maximilian Götz	(Italy) Raffaele Marciello	(Germany) Fabian Schiller
10	(Germany) GetSpeed Performance	Mercedes-AMG GT3 Evo	(United States) Janine Hill	(Finland) Markus Palttala	(United States) John Shoffner	(Belgium) Maxime Soulet
11	(Germany) IronForce Racing	Audi R8 LMS Evo	(Germany) Elia Erhart	(Germany) Pierre Kaffer	(Austria) Simon Reicher	(Germany) Jan-Erik Slooten
15	(Germany) RaceIng - powered by HFG / Racing Engineers GmbH	Audi R8 LMS Evo	(Germany) Stefan Aust	(Germany) Christian Bollrath	(Switzerland) Rahel Frey	(Germany) Bernhard Henzel
16	(Germany) Hella Pagid - racing one	Ferrari 488 GT3	(Germany) Christian Kohlhaas	(Germany) Stephan Köhler	(Switzerland) Nikolaj Rovigue	(Netherlands) Jules Szymkowiak
18	(Hong Kong) KCMG	Porsche 911 GT3 R	(New Zealand) Earl Bamber	(Germany) Jörg Bergmeister	(Germany) Timo Bernhard	(Norway) Dennis Olsen
19	(Hong Kong) KCMG	Porsche 911 GT3 R	(Australia) Josh Burdon	(Switzerland) Alexandre Imperatori	(Italy) Edoardo Liberati	(Norway) Dennis Olsen
21	(Austria) Konrad Motorsport	Lamborghini Huracán GT3 Evo	(Zimbabwe) Axcil Jefferies	(Italy) Marco Mapelli	(Germany) Michele Di Martino	(France) Franck Perera
22	(Germany) 10Q Racing Team Hauer & Zabel GbR	Mercedes-AMG GT3 Evo	(Germany) Sebastian Asch	(Germany) Kenneth Heyer	(Austria) Thomas Jäger	(Spain) Daniel Juncadella
25	(Germany) Huber Motorsport	Porsche 911 GT3 R	(Germany) Marco Holzer	(Germany) Patrick Kolb	(Germany) Nico Menzel	(Italy) Lorenzo Rocco di Torrepadula
26	(Switzerland) Octane126	Ferrari 488 GT3	(Germany) Björn Grossmann	(Switzerland) Jonathan Hirschi	(Germany) Luca Ludwig	(Switzerland) Simon Trummer
29	(Germany) Audi Sport Team Land	Audi R8 LMS Evo	(Italy) Mattia Drudi	(South Africa) Kelvin van der Linde	(Germany) Christopher Mies	(Germany) René Rast
30	(Germany) Frikadelli Racing Team	Porsche 911 GT3 R	(Germany) Klaus Abbelen	(Germany) Alex Müller	(Germany) Robert Renauer	(Austria) Norbert Siedler
31	(Germany) Frikadelli Racing Team	Porsche 911 GT3 R	(Germany) Lance David Arnold	(France) Mathieu Jaminet	(Germany) Lars Kern	(Belgium) Maxime Martin
33	(Germany) Falken Motorsports	Porsche 911 GT3 R	(Austria) Klaus Bachler	(Germany) Christian Engelhart	(Germany) Sven Müller	(Germany) Dirk Werner
42	(Germany) BMW Team Schnitzer	BMW M6 GT3	(Brazil) Augusto Farfus	(Germany) Jens Klingmann	(South Africa) Sheldon van der Linde	(Germany) Martin Tomczyk
44	(Germany) Falken Motorsports	Porsche 911 GT3 R	(Austria) Klaus Bachler	(United Kingdom) Peter Dumbreck	(Germany) Sven Müller	(Austria) Martin Ragginger
98	(Germany) Rowe Racing	BMW M6 GT3	(Austria) Lucas Auer	(United Kingdom) Tom Blomqvist	(Austria) Philipp Eng	(Germany) Marco Wittmann
99	(Germany) Rowe Racing	BMW M6 GT3	(Netherlands) Nicky Catsburg	(Austria) Philipp Eng	(United Kingdom) Alexander Sims	(United Kingdom) Nick Yelloly
100	(Germany) Walkenhorst Motorsport	BMW M6 GT3	(Germany) Friedrich von Bohlen	(Germany) Mario von Bohlen	(Germany) Henry Walkenhorst	(Germany) Andreas Ziegler
101	(Germany) Walkenhorst Motorsport	BMW M6 GT3	(Denmark) Mikkel Jensen	(Norway) Christian Krognes	(South Africa) Jordan Pepper	(United Kingdom) David Pittard
911	(Germany) Manthey-Racing (Note: Porsche withdrew the Manthey-Racing team following the 24 Hours of Le Mans. The Manthey team ran the Porsche entry there and following concerns over COVID-19 Porsche decided not to enter. A number of drivers for other teams were affected as Porsche withdrew all members who were at Le Mans.)	Porsche 911 GT3 R	(France) Julien Andlauer	(Australia) Matt Campbell	(France) Mathieu Jaminet	(Germany) Lars Kern
SP 10 – SRO GT4 (4 entries)
37	(Germany) Novel Racing with Toyo Tire by Ring Racing	Toyota GR Supra GT4	(Japan) Turbo Asahi	(Japan) Tohjiro Azuma	(Germany) Andreas Gülden	(Germany) Mike Stursberg
70	(Switzerland) Hofor Racing by Bonk Motorsport	BMW M4 GT4	(Austria) Michael Fischer	(Germany) Sebastian von Gartzen	(Germany) Claudia Hürtgen	(Germany) Michael Schrey
71	(Germany) Prosport-Racing	Aston Martin Vantage AMR GT4	(Belgium) Guido Dumarey	(Germany) Michael Hess	(Belgium) Nico Verdonck	(United Kingdom) Alexander Walker
75	(Germany) Allied-Racing	Porsche 718 Cayman GT4 Clubsport MR	(Netherlands) Ricardo van der Ende	(Germany) Dennis Fetzer	(Denmark) Nicolaj Møller Madsen	(Germany) Luca-Sandro Trefz
SP 8T (4 entries)
38	Black Falcon Team Textar	Mercedes-AMG GT4	Mustafa Mehmet Kaya (TUR)	Mike Stursberg (GER)	Reinhold Renger (GER)	Tristan Viidas (EST)
59	Garage 59	Aston Martin Vantage AMR GT4	Alexander West (GBR)	Chris Goodwin (GBR)	Darren Turner (GBR)	Jonathan Adam (GBR)
73	Walkenhorst Motorsport	BMW M4 GT4	Dan Harper (GBR)	Neil Verhagen (USA)	Max Hesse (GER)	
74	Walkenhorst Motorsport	BMW M4 GT4	Ben Tuck (GBR)	Jörg Breuer (GER)	Dirk-Tobias Wahl (GER)	Sami-Matti Trogen (FIN)
SP 8 (2 entries)
53	Giti Tire Motorsport by WS Racing	Audi R8 LMS GT4	Kari-Pekka Laaksonen (FIN)	Kristian Jepsen (DEN)	Jan Sorensen (DEN)	Roland Waschkau (GER)
54	Novel Racing with Toyo Tire by Ring Racing	Lexus RCF	Turbo Asahi (JPN)	Yoshinobu Koyama (JPN)	Dominik Farnbacher (GER)	Klaus Völker (GER)
SP 7 (7 entries)
58	W&S Motorsport GmbH	Porsche Cayman 718 GT4 MR	Marvin Dienst (GER)	Niklas Steinhaus (GER)	Kai Riemer (GER)	Tim Scheerbarth (GER)
61	CP Racing	Porsche 991 Cup Gen 2	Charles Putman (USA)	Charles Espenlaub (USA)	Joe Foster (USA)	Shane Lewis (USA)
62		Porsche 991 GT3 Cup	Bill Cameron (GBR)	Jim Cameron (GBR)	Ralf-Peter Bonk (GER)	Arno Klasen (GER)
63	RPM Racing	Porsche 991 Cup	Milan Kodidek (CZE)	Bob Wilwert (LUX)	Marco van Ramshorst (NLD)	Kris Cools (BEL)
64	rent2Drive-Familia racing	Porsche 991 GT3 Cup	"Der Bommel" (GER)	Bernd Kleeschulte (GER)	Hendrik Still (GER)	Phil Hill (GER)
65	Huber Motorsport	Porsche 911 GT3 Cup	Philipp Neuffer (GER)	Hans Wehrmann (GER)	Johannes Stengel (GER)	Florian Spengler (GER)
69	Clickversicherung.de Team	Porsche 911 GT3 Cup	Robin Chrzanowski (GER)	Kersten Jodexnis (GER)	Peter Scharmach (NZL)	Max Koch (GER)
SP 4 (1 entry)
106	Scuderia Solagon e.V.	BMW 325i E90	Sebastian Schemmann (GER)	Hans-Joachim Legermann (GER)	Marc Riebel (GER)	Philip Ade (GER)
SP 4T (2 entries)
86	Team Mathol Racing e.V.	Porsche Cayman 718 GTS	Alexander Köppen (GER)	Yann Munhowen (LUX)	Alain Pier (LUX)	Peter Cate (GBR)
718		Porsche Cayman 718 GTS	Ralf Zansen (GER)	Fabian Peitzmeier (GER)	Klaus Müller (GER)	Christian Dannesberger (GER)
SP 3 (4 entries)
119	Toyota Gazoo Racing Team Thailand	Toyota Corolla Altis	Suttipong Smittachartch (THA)	Nattavude Charoensukhawatana (THA)	Manat Kulapalanont (THA)	Nattapong Hortongkum (THA)
120	Toyota Gazoo Racing Team Thailand	Toyota Corolla Altis	Grant Supaphongs (THA)	Chen Jian Hong (TAI)	Naoki Kawamura (JPN)	
123	Goedicke / Sesterheim Racing	Renault Clio	Holger Goedicke (GER)	Jürgen Nett (GER)	Joachim Nett (GER)	
124	Pit Lane - AMC Sankt Vith	Toyota GT86 Cup	Jacques Derenne (BEL)	"Brody" (BEL)	Olivier Muytjens (BEL)	
SP 3T (3 entries)
89	Giti Tire Motorsport by WS Racing	Volkswagen Golf VII GTI	Carrie Schreiner (GER)	Laura Kraihamer (AUT)	Célia Martin (FRA)	
90	TJ-Racing-Team	Opel Astra Cup	Jean Philippe Imparato (FRA)	Herbie Schmidt (SWI)	Carlos Antunes Tavares (POR)	Francois Wales (FRA)
91	Giti Tire Motorsport by WS Racing	Volkswagen Golf VI GTI	Niklas Kry (GER)	David Drinkwater (GBR)	Wayne-Steven Moore (NZL)	Tommy Fortchantre (GER)
SP–Pro (1 entry)
35	Black Falcon Team Identica	Porsche 911 GT3 Cup MR	Marek Böckmann (GER)	Tobias Müller (GER)	Carlos Rivas (LUX)	Maik Rosenberg (GER)
SP–X (1 entry)
704	Scuderia Cameron Glickenhaus	Scuderia Cameron Glickenhaus SCG004c	Thomas Mutsch (GER)	Franck Mailleux (FRA)	Felipe Fernández Laser (GER)	Richard Westbrook (GBR)
VLN Production Classes
V 2T (7 entries)
92	Giti Tire Motorsport by WS Racing	Volkswagen Golf VII GTI	Axel Jahn (GER)	Ulrich Schmidt (GER)	Sven Friesecke (SWI)	Julian Koch (GER)
162	TJ-Racing-Team	Opel Astra OPC	Michael Eichhorn (GER)	Daniel Jenichen (GER)	Olivier Leibel-Perrois (FRA)	Christian Gatterer (GER)
163	Team AVIA Sorg Rennsport	BMW 330i	Björn Simon (GER)	Emir Asari (TUR)	Torsten Kratz (GER)	Luis Ramirez (GER)
164	Team AVIA Sorg Rennsport	BMW 330i	Reinhard Schmiedel (GER)	Ugo Vicenzi (ITA)	Rasmus Helmich (DEN)	Murat Ates (GER)
165	Engstler Motorsport / Hyundai Team Engstler	Hyundai i30 Fastback N	Kai Jordan (GER)	Markus Lungstrass (GER)	Marc Ehret (GER)	
166	Manheller Racing	BMW 330i F30	Ronny Lethmate (GER)	Martin Owen (GBR)	Kurt Strube (GER)	Yutaka Seki (JPN)
330	Pixum CFN Team Adrenalin Motorsport	BMW 330i G20	Philipp Stahlschmidt (GER)	Christopher Rink (GER)	Danny Brink (GER)	Philipp Leisen (GER)
V 3T (1 entry)
85	Team Mathol Racing e.V.	Porsche 718 Cayman S	Wolfgang Weber (GER)	Sebastian Schäfer (SWI)	Alexander Fielenbach (GER)	Immanuel Finke (GER)
V 4 (5 entries)
149		BMW 325i E90	Jürgen Huber (GER)	Simon Sagmeister (GER)	Florian Quante (GER)	Oliver Frisse (GER)
151		BMW 325i E90	Florian Haller (ITA)	Daniel Fink (ITA)	David Lanthaler (AUT)	Johannes Weger (SWI)
152	KKrämer Racing	BMW 325i E90	Bernd Küpper (GER)	Marc Raitzheim (GER)	Evgeny Sokolovsky (UKR)	Kevin Kuepper (GER)
153	MSC Wahlscheid Keeevin Sports & Racing	BMW 325i E90	Juha Miettinen (FIN)	Dan Berghult (SWE)	Andrew Engelmann (GER)	Markus Löw (GER)
154	rent2Drive-Familia-racing	BMW 325i E90	Richard Gresek (GER)	Philipp Gresek (GER)	Werner Gusenbauer (GER)	Moritz Gusenbauer (GER)
V 6 (2 entries)
131	Pixum CFN Team Adrenalin Motorsport	Porsche 718 Cayman S	Christian Büllesbach (GER)	Andreas Schettler (GER)	Carlos Arimon (SPA)	Ulrich Korn (GER)
132	Team Mathol Racing e.V.	Porsche Cayman S	Wolfgang Kaufmann (GER)	Dorian Boccolacci (FRA)	Andy Soucek (SPA)	Rudolf Rhyn (SWI)
Cup Classes
Cup 3 – Cayman GT4 Trophy (6 entries)
301	Team Mathol Racing e.V.	Porsche Cayman 718 GT4 CS	Rüdiger Schicht (SWI)	"Montana" (GER)	Steve Brooks (GBR)	Daniel Bohr (LUX)
302	W&S Motorsport GmbH	Porsche Cayman 981 GT4 CS	Jürgen Vöhringer (GER)	Sébastien Carcone (FRA)	Heinz Dolfen (GER)	Kim Berwanger (GER)
303	KKrämer Racing	Porsche Cayman 718 GT4 CS	Karsten Krämer (GER)	Sascha Kloft (GER)	Heiko Tönges (GER)	Alexey Veremenko (RUS)
304	KKrämer Racing	Porsche Cayman GT4 CS	Henning Cramer (GER)	Steffen Höber (GER)	Andreas Gabler (USA)	Armin Baumann (GER)
305		Porsche Cayman 981 GT4	Patrik Grütter (GER)	Fabio Grosse (GER)	Otto Nicholas (GER)	
306	Black Falcon Team Textar	Porsche Cayman 982 GT4 CS	Ben Bünnagel (GER)	"Max" (GER)	Florian Naumann (GER)	Michael Rebhan (GER)
Cup 5 – BMW M240i Racing Cup (7 entries)
237	Schnitzelalm Racing	BMW M240i Racing	Marcel Marchewicz (GER)	Tim Neuser (GER)	Fabio Grosse (GER)	Wilhelm Weirich (GER)
239	Team AVIA Sorg Rennsport	BMW M240i Racing	Heiko Eichenberg (GER)	Moritz Oberheim (GER)	Ivan Berets (RUS)	
240	Pixum CFN Team Adrenalin Motorsport	BMW M240i Racing	Oskar Sandberg (NOR)	David Griessner (AUT)	Francesco Merlini (ITA)	Roland Froese (GER)
241	Pixum CFN Team Adrenalin Motorsport	BMW M240i Racing	Jacek Pydys (GER)	Juan Carlos Carmona Chavez (MEX)	Kevin Warum (GER)	Thomas Ardelt (GER)
242	Pixum CFN Team Adrenalin Motorsport	BMW M240i Racing	Davide Bertello (ITA)	Charlie Martin (GBR)	Lutz Rühl (GER)	Jens Bombosch (GER)
243	Hofor Racing by Bonk Motorsport	BMW M240i Racing	Jürgen Meyer (GER)	Axel Burghardt (GER)	Rainer Partl (GER)	Michael Bonk (GER)
307	JJ Motorsport	BMW M240i Racing	Hakan Sari (BEL)	Recep Sari (BEL)	Ersin Yücesan (TUR)	
Cup–X – KTM X-Bow Cup (2 entries)
110	Teichmann Racing	KTM X-Bow GT4	Stephan Brodmerkel (GER)	Reinhard Kofler (AUT)	Karl-Heinz Teichmann (GER)	Ercan Kara-Osman (GRE)
111	Teichmann Racing	KTM X-Bow GT4	Georg Griesemann (GER)	Reinhard Kofler (AUT)	Maik Rönnefarth (GER)	Yves Volte (GER)
Other Classes
TCR Class (4 entries)
170	Autohaus M. Fugel	Honda Civic Type R TCR (FK8)	Dominik Fugel (GER)	Tiago Monteiro (POR)	Markus Oestreich (GER)	Esteban Guerrieri (ARG)
171	Bonk Motorsport	Audi RS 3 LMS TCR	Hermann Bock (GER)	Max Partl (GER)	Alex Prinz (GER)	Andeas Moentmann (SUI)
830	Hyundai Motorsport N	Hyundai i30 N TCR	Harald Proczyk (AUT)	Luca Engstler (GER)	Antti Buri (FIN)	Manuel Lauck (GER)
831	Hyundai Motorsport N	Hyundai Veloster N TCR	Marc Basseng (GER)	Moritz Oestreich (GER)	Peter Terting (GER)	Manuel Lauck (GER)
Class AT (3 entries)
109	OVR Racing Cologne	Ford Mustang GT	Ralph Caba (GER)	Oliver Sprungmann (GER)	Alex Müller (GER)	
320	Four Motors Bioconcept-Car	Porsche 911 GT3 Cup II	Thomas von Löwis of Menar (GER)	Thomas Kiefer (GER)	"Smudo" (GER)	Charles Kauffman (LUX)
420	Four Motors Bioconcept-Car	Porsche Cayman GT4 CS	Marco Timbal (SWI)	Henrik Bollerslev (DEN)	Matthias Beckwermert (GER)	Nicola Bravetti (SWI)

== Qualifying and Race results ==
=== Qualifying result ===
Qualifying 2 was cut short due to an accident. The top four cars from Top Qualifying 1 progressed to Top Qualifying 2. Maro Engel driving the HRT-Mercedes-AMG took pole position in top qualifying 2 and claimed the Glickenhaus Trophy. It is the third time that Mercedes and Engel have claimed pole position.

Pos.	Class	No.	Team	Fastest lap from Qualifying 1, 2 and 3	Top Qualifying 1	Top Qualifying 2
1	SP 9 Pro	4	Mercedes-AMG Team HRT		9:18.553	8:57.884
2	SP 9 Pro	26	Octane126			9:02.814
3	SP 9 Pro	9	Mercedes-AMG Team GetSpeed			9:03.118
4	SP 9 Pro	22	10Q Racing Team Hauer & Zabel GbR		9:19.015	9:04.771
5	SP 9 Pro	99	Rowe Racing			9:08.655
6	SP 9 Pro	42	BMW Team Schnitzer			9:09.485
7	SP 9 Pro-Am	8	GetSpeed Performance			9:09.781
8	SP 9 Pro	98	Rowe Racing			9:20.322
9	SP 9 Pro	101	Walkenhorst Motorsport			9:20.566
10	SP 9 Pro-Am	10	GetSpeed Performance			9:21.541
11	SP 9 Pro	3	Audi Sport Team			9:23.211
12	SP 9 Pro	5	Phoenix Racing		9:27.130	9:27.685
13	SP 9 Pro	1	Audi Sport Team			9:27.854
14	SP 9 Pro-Am	30	Frikadelli Racing Team			9:28.170
15	SP 9 Pro	29	Audi Sport Team			9:33.736
16	SP 9 Pro-Am	100	Walkenhorst Motorsport			10:03.538
17	SP 9 Pro	18	KCMG		9:18.791	DNS
18	SP 9 Pro	31	Frikadelli Racing Team		9:28.988	
19	SP 9 Pro	6	Mercedes-AMG Team HRT AutoArenA		9:30.134	
20	SP 9 Pro	2	Mercedes-AMG Team HRT		9:31.032	
21	SP 9 Pro	33	Falken Motorsports		9:31.623	
22	SP9 Pro	19	KCMG		9:31.660	
23	SP 9 Pro	21	Konrad Motorsport		9:31.753	
24	SP 9 Pro-Am	11	IronForce Racing		9:33.616	
25	SP 9 Pro-Am	16	Hella Pagid - racing one		9:33.643	
26	SP 9 Pro-Am	25	Huber Motorsport		9:36.780	
27	SP 9 Pro	44	Falken Motorsports		9:39.713	
28	SP-X Pro	704	Scuderia Cameron Glickenhaus		9:45.956	
29	SP 9 Pro-Am	15	: RaceIng - powered by HFG / Racing Engineers GmbH		9:57.020	
30	SP-Pro Pro	35	Black Falcon Team Identica		9:58.203	

=== Race Result overall ===
At 22:33 the race was stopped due to heavy rain which resulted in poor visibility and track conditions due to standing water along with forecast of more rain. At 08:00 the next morning, some 9 1/2 hours later the race was restarted with a lap behind the safety car in two groups just like the start of the race is held. This was the seventh occasion that the weather had led to the race being suspended. The Rowe Racing entry driven by Nick Catsburg, Alexander Sims and Nick Yelloly won the overall race. It was the first BMW car to win for 10 years and the 20th win for BMW in the history of the event.

Pos.	Class	No.	Team	Laps completed	Total Time	Gap between positions	Gap to leader
1	SP 9 Pro	99	Rowe Racing	85	24:01:05.424		
2	SP 9 Pro	3	Audi Sport Team Car Collection	85	24:01:20.876	+15.452	+15.452
3	SP 9 Pro	42	BMW Team Schnitzer	85	24:02:50.986	+1:30.110	+1:45.562
4	SP 9 Pro	98	Rowe Racing	85	24:04:04.496	+1:13.510	+2:59.072
5	SP 9 Pro	1	Audi Sport Team Phoenix	85	24:04:06.190	+0:01.694	+3:00.766
6	SP 9 Pro	29	Audi Sport Team Land	85	24:06:01.621	+1:55.431	+4:56.197
7	SP 9 Pro	31	Frikadelli Racing Team	85	24:06:52.714	+0:51.093	+5:47.290
8	SP 9 Pro	6	Mercedes-AMG Team HRT AutoArena	85	24:09:35.745	+2:43.031	+8:30.321
9	SP 9 Pro	2	Mercedes-AMG Team HRT Bilstein	84	24:02:55.924		+1 Lap
10	SP 9 Pro	44	Falken Motorsports	84	24:04:50.571	+1:54.647	+1 Lap
11	SP 9 Pro	33	Falken Motorsports	83	24:00:02.649		+2 Laps
12	SP 9 Pro	101	Walkenhorst Motorsport	83	24:04:46.523	+4:43.874	+2 Laps
13	SP 9 Pro	18	KCMG	83	24:08:07.237	+3:20.714	+2 Laps
14	SP X	704	Scuderia Cameron Glickenhaus	82	24:00:29.697		+3 Laps
15	SP 9 Pro-Am	25	Huber Motorsport	82	24:07:49.556	+7:19.859	+3 Laps
16	SP 9 Pro-Am	7	Car Collection Motorsport	82	24:08:22.061	+0:32.505	+3 Laps
17	SP 9 Pro-Am	10	GetSpeed Performance	79	24:01:51.576		+6 Laps
18	SP 9 Pro-Am	11	IronForce Racing	79	24:03:54.653	+2:03.077	+6 Laps
19	SP 8T	73	Walkenhorst Motorsport	78	24:00:41.068		+7 Laps
20	TCR	170	Autohaus M. Fugel	78	24:06:18.191	+5:37.123	+7 Laps
21	SP 8T	38	Black Falcon Team Textar	78	24:09:27.608	+3:09.417	+7 Laps
22	SP Pro	35	Black Falcon Team Identica	77	24:02:24.593		+8 Laps
23	TCR	831	Hyundai Motorsport N	77	24:02:38.333	+0:13.740	+8 Laps
24	Cup-X	111	Teichmann Racing GmbH	77	24:07:33.872	+4:55.539	+8 Laps
25	SP 8T	59	Garage 59	77	24:08:18.301	+0:44.429	+8 Laps
26	SP 10	70	Hofor Racing by Bonk Motorsport	76	24:00:33.875		+9 Laps
27	SP 10	75	Allied-Racing GmbH	76	24:02:20.699	+1:46.824	+9 Laps
28	SP 7	65	Huber Motorsport	76	24:03:02.591	+0:41.892	+9 Laps
29	SP 7	58	W&S Motorsport GmbH	76	24:04:00.191	+0:57.600	+9 Laps
30	Cup 3	306	Black Falcon Team Textar	76	24:05:54.717	+1:54.526	+9 Laps
31	Kl. Cup	240	Pixum CFN Team Adrenalin Motorsport	76	24:02:38.333	+0:07.651	+9 Laps
32	Kl. Cup	239	Team Avia Sorg Rennsport	76	24:06:25.266	+0:22.898	+9 Laps
33	TCR	171	Bonk Motorsport	75	24:04:43.475		+10 Laps
34	Kl. Cup	237	Schnitzelalm Racing	75	24:05:43.855	+1:00.380	+10 Laps
35	SP 8T	74	Walkenhorst Motorsport	73	24:00:54.080		+12 Laps
36	Cup 3	305		73	24:03:24.989	+2:30.909	+12 Laps
37	SP 7	62		73	24:05:07.385	+1:42.396	+12 Laps
38	Cup 3	303	KKrämer Racing	73	24:05:15.289	+0:07.904	+12 Laps
39	Cup 3	301	Team Mathol Racing e.V.	73	24:07:16.703	+2:01.414	+12 Laps
40	V2T	330	Pixum CFN Team Adrenalin Motorsport	72	24:07:48.834		+13 Laps
41	V 6	132	Team Mathol Racing e.V.	71	24:02:50.107		+14 Laps
42	V 3T	85	Team Mathol Racing e.V.	71	24:03:56.681	+1:06.574	+14 Laps
43	V2T	163	Team Avia Sorg Rennsport	71	24:06:22.883	+2:26.202	+14 Laps
44	SP 9 Pro-Am	16	Hella Pagid - racing one	71	24:07:47.814	+1:24.931	+14 Laps
45	AT	320	Four Motors Bioconcept-Car	71	24:09:27.041	+1:36.263	+14 Laps
46	Cup-X	110	Teichmann Racing	71	24:09:27.041	+0:02.964	+14 Laps
47	V 6	131	Pixum CFN Team Adrenalin Motorsport	71	24:09:49.535	+0:22.494	+14 Laps
48	AT	420	Four Motors Bioconcept-Car	70	24:01:10.268		+15 Laps
49	SP 10	71	Prosport-Racing GmbH	70	24:01:23.655	+0:13.387	+15 Laps
50	SP 3T	165	Engstler Motorsport / Hyundai Team Engstler	70	24:02:38.332	+1:14.677	+15 Laps
51	TCR	830	Hyundai Motorsport N	70	24:05:35.347	+2:57.015	+15 Laps
52	Kl. Cup	242	Pixum CFN Team Adrenalin Motorsport	70	24:08:12.273	+2:36.926	+15 Laps
53	SP 4T	86		70	24:10:54.548	+2:42.275	+15 Laps
54	SP 7	69	Clickversicherung.de Team	69	24:05:39.085		+16 Laps
55	Kl. Cup	241	Pixum CFN Team Adrenalin Motorsport	69	24:07:22.796	+1:43.711	+16 Laps
56	V 4	149		68	24:01:19.589		+17 Laps
57	V 4	154	rent2Drive-FAMILIA-racing	68	24:04:34.252	+3:14.663	+17 Laps
58	Kl. Cup	243	Hofor Racing by Bonk Motorsport	68	24:06:00.653	+1:26.401	+17 Laps
59	V2T	92	Giti Tire Motorsport by WS Racing	67	24:02:38.333		+18 Laps
60	SP 3	120	Toyota Gazoo Racing Team Thailand	67	24:05:51.477	+1:52.914	+18 Laps
61	SP 4T	718		67	24:07:01.765	+1:10.288	+18 Laps
62	Kl. Cup	307	JJ Motorsport	66	24:00:45.673		+19 Laps
63	V 4	153	MSC Wahlscheid e.V. / Keeevin Sports & Racing	66	24:04:35.255	+3:49.582	+19 Laps
64	SP 3T	91	Giti Tire Motorsport by WS Racing	66	24:06:18.221	+1:42.966	+19 Laps
65	V2T	162		66	24:07:16.970	+0:58.749	+19 Laps
66	BMW Mi	39	MSC Wahlscheid e.V. / Keeevin Sports & Racing	66	24:09:12.657	+1:55.687	+19 Laps
67	SP 3	119	Toyota Gazoo Racing Team Thailand	65	24:10:51.742		+20 Laps
68	V 4	151		64	24:11:48.496		+21 Laps
69	V 4	152	KKrämer Racing	63	24:00:58.008		+22 Laps
70	SP 8	53	Giti Tire Motorsport by WS Racing	62	24:00:14.591		+23 Laps
71	V2T	164	Team Avia Sorg Rennsport	62	24:00:46.306	+0:31.715	+23 Laps
72	SP 3T	89	Giti Tire Motorsport by WS Racing	62	24:02:07.851	+1:21.545	+23 Laps
73	SP 4	106	Scuderia Solagon e.V.	60	24:00:20.743		+25 Laps
74	AT	109		59	24:09:27.745		+26 Laps
NC	SP 9 Pro	30	Frikadelli Racing Team	81	24:07:22.993		+4 Laps
NC	SP 9 Pro	26	Octane126	79	24:08:18.006		+6 Laps
NC	SP 9 Pro	22	10Q Racing Team Hauer & Zabel	77	22:56:15.198		+8 Laps
NC	SP 7	63		74	24:07:08.929		+11 Laps
NC	SP 10	37	Novel Racing with Toyo Tire by Ring Racing	73	24:00:24.732		+12 Laps
NC	SP 3	124	Pit Lane - AMC	66	24:07:18.272		+19 Laps
NC	BMW MG	36	Pixum CFN Team Adrenalin Motorsport	65	24:05:17.499		+20 Laps
NC	V2T	124	Manheller Racing	49	24:08:35.806		+36 Laps
DNF	Cup 3	302	W&S Motorsport GmbH	69	23:50:35.177		
DNF	SP 9 Pro	9	Mercedes-AMG Team GetSpeed	66	21:23:05.673		
DNF	SP 9 Pro	5	Phoenix Racing	65	20:54:10.034		
DNF	SP 9 Pro	19	KCMG	59	19:57:42.028		
DNF	Cup 3	304	KKrämer Racing	54	20:52:52.850		
DNF	SP 8	54	Novel Racing with Toyo Tire by Ring Racing	47	19:29:31.630		
DNF	SP 3T	90		46	20:49:48.344		
DNF	SP 9 Pro-Am	100	Walkenhorst Motorsport	37	21:57:02.029		
DNF	SP 9 Pro-Am	15	RaceIng - powered by HFG / Racing Engineers GmbH	34	6:51:53.177		
DNF	SP 7	64	rent2Drive-FAMILIA-racing	30	5:58:30.217		
DNF	SP 7	61	CP Racing	30	6:03:18.779		
DNF	SP 9 Pro	4	Mercedes-AMG Team HRT	28	4:42:43.378		
DNF	SP 3	123		22	4:39:33.913		
DNF	SP 9 Pro	21	Konrad Motorsport	15	2:29:59.496		
DNF	SP 9 Pro-Am	8	GetSpeed Performance	5	49:23.175		

=== Winner by Class ===
Class	Pos. overall	Number	Team	Driver	Vehicle	Laps
AT	45	320	Four Motors Bioconcept-Car	Thomas v. Löwis (DEU); Thomas Kiefer (DEU); Smudo (DEU); Charles Kauffman (LUX)	Porsche 911 GT3 Cup II	71
BMW M2 CS	66	39	MSC Wahlscheid e.V. / Keeevin Sports & Racing	Klaus Faßbender (DEU); Kevin Wolters (DEU); Guido Wirtz (CHE)	BMW M2 CS	66
CUP 3	30	306	Black Falcon Team TEXTAR	Ben Bünnagel (DEU); Max Berlin (DEU); Florian Naumann (DEU); Michael Rebhan (DEU)	Porsche 718 Cayman GT4 CS	76
CUP X	24	111	Teichmann Racing GmbH	Georg Griesemann (DEU); Reinhard Kofler (AUT); Maik Rönnefarth (DEU); Yves Volte (DEU)	KTM X-Bow GT4	77
Kl. Cup 5	31	240	Pixum CFN Team Adrenalin Motorsport	Oskar Sandberg (DEU); David Griessner (AUT); Francesco Merlini (ITA); Roland Fröse (DEU)	BMW M240i Racing	76
SP 10	26	70	Hofor Racing by Bonk Motorsport	Michael Schrey (DEU); Claudia Hürtgen (DEU); Michael Fischer (AUT); Sebastian von Gartzen (DEU)	BMW M4 GT4	76
SP 3	60	120	Toyota Gazoo Racing Team Thailand	Grant Supaphongs (THA); Chen Jian Hong (THA); Naoki Kawamura (JPN)	Toyota Corolla Altis	67
SP 3T	50	165	Engstler Motorsport / Hyundai Team Engstler	Kai Jordan (DEU); Markus Lungstrass (DEU); Marc Ehret (DEU)	Hyundai i30 Fastback N	70
SP 4	73	106	Scuderia Solagon e.V.	Sebastian Schemmann (DEU); Hans Legermann (DEU); Marc Riebel (DEU); Philip Ade (DEU)	BMW 325i	60
SP 4T	53	86		Alexander Köppen (DEU); Yann Munhowen (LUX); Alain Pier (LUX); Peter Cate (GBR)	Porsche 718 Cayman GTS	70
SP 7	28	65	Huber Motorsport	Philipp Neuffer (DEU); Hans Wehrmann (DEU); Johannes Stengel (DEU); Florian Spengler (DEU)	Porsche 911 GT3 Cup	76
SP 8	70	53	GITI TIRE MOTORSPORT by WS RACING	Kari-Pekka Laaksonen (FIN); Kristian Jepsen (DNK); Jan Sorensen (DNK); Roland Waschkau (DEU)	Audi R8 LMS GT4	62
SP 8T	19	73	Walkenhorst Motorsport	Dan Harper (GBR); Neil Verhagen (USA); Max Hesse (DEU)	BMW M4 GT4	78
SP 9	1	99	Rowe Racing (Note: Philipp Eng was an entered driver in the No. 99 Rowe Racing car, but did not complete the required 2 laps. He was not credited with the win.)	Alexander Sims (GBR); Nicky Catsburg (NLD); Nick Yelloly (GBR)	BMW M6 GT3	85
SP-PRO	22	35	Black Falcon Team IDENTICA	Marek Böckmann (DEU); Tobias Müller (DEU); Carlos Rivas (LUX); Maik Rosenberg (DEU)	Porsche 911 GT3 CUP MR	77
SP-X	14	704	Scuderia Cameron Glickenhaus	Thomas Mutsch (DEU); Franck Mailleux (FRA); Felipe Fernández Laser (DEU); Richard Westbrook (GBR)	SCG Scuderia Cameron Glickenhaus	82
TCR	20	170		Dominik Fugel (DEU); Tiago Monteiro (PRT); Markus Oestreich (DEU); Esteban Guerrieri (ARG)	Honda Civic TCR	78
V 3T	42	85	Team Mathol Racing e.V.	Wolfgang Weber (DEU); Sebastian Schäfer (DEU); Alexander Fielenbach (DEU); Immanuel Vinke (DEU)	Porsche 718 Cayman S	71
V 4	56	149		Jürgen Huber (DEU); Simon Sagmeister (DEU); Florian Quante (DEU); Oliver Frisse (DEU)	BMW 325i	68
V 6	41	132	Team Mathol Racing e.V.	Wolfgang Kaufmann (DEU); Dorian Boccolacci (FRA); Andy Soucek (ESP); Rudolf Rhyn (CHE)	Porsche Cayman S	71
V 2T	40	330	Pixum CFN Team Adrenalin Motorsport	Philipp Stahlschmidt (DEU); Christopher Rink (DEU); Danny Brink (DEU); Philipp Leisen (DEU)	BMW 330i	72

== Bibliography ==
- Jörg-Richard Ufer & Tim Upietz. 24 Stunden Nürburgring Nordschleife 2020. Gruppe C Motorsport Verlag. ISBN 978-3-948501-05-1.
