= Kratingdaeng Racing Team =

Thai auto racing team

- Founded: 2009
- Team principal(s): Sak Nana
- Current series: TCR International Series; TCR Thailand Touring Car Championship
- Noted drivers: TCR; 11. (Thailand) Grant Supaphongs; 12. (Germany) Alexander Mies; 58. (Taiwan) Chen Jian Hong; TCR Thailand; 2. (Germany) Alexander Mies; 11. (Thailand) Grant Supaphongs; 58. (Taiwan) Chen Jian Hong
- Website: http://www.kratingdaengracing.com

Kratingdaeng Racing Team is a Thai auto racing team based in Bangkok, Thailand. The team has raced in the TCR International Series, since 2016. Having previously raced in the Thailand Super Series and the VLN amongst others.

== Thailand Super Series ==
The team made their debut in the 2009 Thailand Super Series, with team owner and racing driver Sak Nana. Nana finished seventh in the standings in 2009 and 2010. They still races in the series today, having several driver in different categories. The team is also sponsored by Red Bull Thailand.

For 2016 the team entered the new TCR Thailand Touring Car Championship, a new category in the Thailand Super Series. The team entered three SEAT León Cup Racer's for Alexander Mies, Grant Supaphongs and Chen Jian Hong.

== TCR International Series ==
=== SEAT León Cup Racer (2016–) ===
After having raced in the TCR Thailand Touring Car Championship for most of 2016, the team entered the 2016 TCR International Series with TCR Thailand regulars Alexander Mies, Grant Supaphongs and Chen Jian Hong driving a SEAT León Cup Racer each.
