= Alexander Mies =

German racing driver (born 1992)

- Nationality: (Germany) German
- Born: 25 May 1992 (age 34) Velbert, Düsseldorf, Germany
- Relatives: Christopher Mies (brother)

TCR International Series career
- Debut season: 2016
- Current team: Kratingdaeng Racing Team
- Car number: 12
- Starts: 2

Previous series
- 2016 2015 2010-16 2009 2000-07: TCR Thailand Series; BMW M235i Racing Cup Belgium; VLN; German Slalom Championship; Karting

Championship titles
- 2016 2013: VLN Series; VLN Junior Trophy

Alexander Mies (born 25 June 1992) is a German racing driver who has competed in the TCR International Series, TCR Thailand and the Nürburgring Langstrecken-Serie. He is the overall 2016 VLN Series champion.

He is the younger brother of Audi factory driver and three-time Nürburgring 24 Hours winner Christopher Mies.

== Racing career ==
Mies began his career in 2000 as a kart racer. In 2009, he joined the German Slalom Championship, finishing second in the Junior standings that year. In 2010, he joined the Nürburgring Langstrecken-Serie, going on to win the SP3 class twice at the Nürburgring 24 Hours event in 2011 and 2013, as well as winning the NLS Junior Trophy in 2013. He also raced in the Belgium BMW M235i Racing Cup in 2015, finishing 8th in the championship standings. In 2016, he competed in the TCR Thailand Touring Car Championship.

In August 2016, it was announced that Mies would race in the TCR International Series, driving a SEAT León Cup Racer for Kratingdaeng Racing Team.

== Racing record ==
=== Complete TCR International Series results ===
(key) (Races in bold indicate pole position) (Races in italics indicate fastest lap)

Year	Team	Car	1	2	3	4	5	6	7	8	9	10	11	12	13	14	15	16	17	18	19	20	21	22	DC	Points
2016	Kratingdaeng Racing Team	SEAT León Cup Racer	BHR; 1	BHR; 2	POR; 1	POR; 2	BEL; 1	BEL; 2	ITA; 1	ITA; 2	AUT; 1	AUT; 2	GER; 1	GER; 2	RUS; 1	RUS; 2	THA; 1; 13	THA; 2; 12	SIN; 1	SIN; 2	MYS; 1	MYS; 2	MAC; 1	MAC; 2	NC	0
