= Chen Jian Hong =

Taiwanese racing driver (born 1975)

- Nationality: Taiwanese
- Born: 23 August 1975 (age 51) Taichung, Taiwan

TCR International Series career
- Debut season: 2016
- Current team: Kratingdaeng Racing Team
- Car number: 58
- Starts: 2

Previous series
- 2016 2011-15 2009-11 2008-09, 12, 15: TCR Thailand Series; RAAT 6 Hours; Thai Toyota Yaris Cup; Thailand Super Series

Championship titles
- 2009 2009, 11: Thailand Super Series - S1500; Thai Toyota Yaris Cup

Chen Jian Hong (born 23 August 1975) is a Taiwanese racing driver currently competing in the TCR International Series and TCR Thailand Touring Car Championship. Having previously competed in the Thailand Super Series and the RAAT 6 Hours amongst others. He also owns TS Motor SPORT LTD, a company that specialised in high performance suspension that manufactured in Taiwan.

== Racing career ==
Chen began his career in 2008 in the Thailand Super Series, he raced in the S1500 class, finishing second in 2008 before winning the championship in 2009. He also won the Toyota Yaris Cup in 2009, continuing in the series in 2010, he finished second in standings that year. Switching to the Thai RAAT 6 Hours series in 2011, winning Division 2 from 2011 to 2013. Switching to Division 1 for 2014, he won the class in both 2014 and 2015. For 2016, he switched to the all new 2016 TCR Thailand Touring Car Championship.

In August 2016, it was announced that Chen would race in the TCR International Series, driving a SEAT León Cup Racer for Kratingdaeng Racing Team.

== Racing record ==
=== Complete TCR International Series results ===
(key) (Races in bold indicate pole position) (Races in italics indicate fastest lap)

Year	Team	Car	1	2	3	4	5	6	7	8	9	10	11	12	13	14	15	16	17	18	19	20	21	22	DC	Points
2016	Kratingdaeng Racing Team	SEAT León Cup Racer	BHR; 1	BHR; 2	POR; 1	POR; 2	BEL; 1	BEL; 2	ITA; 1	ITA; 2	AUT; 1	AUT; 2	GER; 1	GER; 2	RUS; 1	RUS; 2	THA; 1; 15	THA; 2; 15	SIN; 1	SIN; 2	MYS; 1	MYS; 2	MAC; 1	MAC; 2	NC	0
