= Grant Supaphongs =

Thai racing driver (born 1976)

- Nationality: Thai
- Born: 12 April 1976 (age 50) Bangkok, Thailand

TCR International Series career
- Debut season: 2016
- Current team: Kratingdaeng Racing Team
- Car number: 11
- Starts: 2

Previous series
- 2016 2008-10, 14-15: TCR Thailand Series; Thailand Super Series

Championship titles
- 2015 2008-10: Thailand Super Series - GTC; Thailand Super Series - S2000

Grant "Jum" Supaphongs (born 12 April 1976) is a Thai racing driver currently competing in the TCR International Series and TCR Thailand Touring Car Championship. He has previously competed in the Thailand Super Series.

== Racing career ==
Supaphongs began his career in 2008 in the Thailand Super Series, he raced in the Super 2000 class for three seasons up until 2010. Winning the championship every season for that period. After a four-year hiatus, he returned to racing in 2014 where he switched to GTC class in the Thailand Super Series, he finished second in the standings that year, before winning the championship in 2015. He switched to the all new 2016 TCR Thailand Touring Car Championship the following year.

In August 2016, it was announced that Supaphongs would race in the TCR International Series, driving a SEAT León Cup Racer for Kratingdaeng Racing Team.

== Racing record ==
=== Complete TCR International Series results ===
(key) (Races in bold indicate pole position) (Races in italics indicate fastest lap)

Year	Team	Car	1	2	3	4	5	6	7	8	9	10	11	12	13	14	15	16	17	18	19	20	21	22	DC	Points
2016	Kratingdaeng Racing Team	SEAT León Cup Racer	BHR; 1	BHR; 2	POR; 1	POR; 2	BEL; 1	BEL; 2	ITA; 1	ITA; 2	AUT; 1	AUT; 2	GER; 1	GER; 2	RUS; 1	RUS; 2	THA; 1; 19	THA; 2; 14	SIN; 1	SIN; 2	MYS; 1	MYS; 2	MAC; 1	MAC; 2	NC	0
