= 2022–23 Middle East Trophy =

Motor racing competition

The 2022–23 Middle East Trophy was the first season of the Middle East Trophy, presented by Creventic. The race are contested with GT3-spec cars, GT4-spec cars, sports cars, 24H-Specials, like silhouette cars, TCR Touring Cars, TCX cars and TC cars.

== Calendar ==
Round	Event	Circuit	Location	Date
1	12 Hours of Kuwait	Kuwait Motor Town	Ali Sabah Al Salem, Kuwait	30 November–2 December 2022
2	Dubai 24 Hour	(United Arab Emirates) Dubai Autodrome	Dubai, United Arab Emirates	13–15 January 2023
3	6 Hours of Abu Dhabi	(United Arab Emirates) Yas Marina Circuit	Abu Dhabi, United Arab Emirates	21–22 January 2023

== Teams and drivers ==
=== GT ===
Team	Car	Engine	No.	Drivers	Class	Rounds
GT3
(Germany) Phoenix Racing	Audi R8 LMS Evo II	Audi 5.2 L V10	1	(Austria) Michael Doppelmayr	PA	2–3
(Germany) Phoenix Racing	Audi R8 LMS Evo II	Audi 5.2 L V10	1	(Germany) Elia Erhart	PA	2–3
(Germany) Phoenix Racing	Audi R8 LMS Evo II	Audi 5.2 L V10	1	(Germany) Pierre Kaffer	PA	2–3
(Germany) Phoenix Racing	Audi R8 LMS Evo II	Audi 5.2 L V10	1	(Germany) Christer Jöns	PA	2
(Germany) Phoenix Racing	Audi R8 LMS Evo II	Audi 5.2 L V10	1	(Germany) Sven Herberger	PA	3
(France) Visiom	Ferrari 488 GT3 Evo 2020	Ferrari 3.9 L Twin-Turbo V8	2	(France) Jean-Bernard Bouvet	PA	2
(France) Visiom	Ferrari 488 GT3 Evo 2020	Ferrari 3.9 L Twin-Turbo V8	2	(France) Romain Iannetta	PA	2
(France) Visiom	Ferrari 488 GT3 Evo 2020	Ferrari 3.9 L Twin-Turbo V8	2	(France) Dino Lunardi	PA	2
(France) Visiom	Ferrari 488 GT3 Evo 2020	Ferrari 3.9 L Twin-Turbo V8	2	(France) Jean-Paul Pagny	PA	2
(France) Visiom	Ferrari 488 GT3 Evo 2020	Ferrari 3.9 L Twin-Turbo V8	2	(France) Christophe Tinseau	PA	2
(United Arab Emirates) Abu Dhabi Racing by HRT Bilstein	Mercedes-AMG GT3 Evo	Mercedes-AMG M159 6.2 L V8	4	(United Arab Emirates) Khaled Al Qubaisi	P	2
(United Arab Emirates) Abu Dhabi Racing by HRT Bilstein	Mercedes-AMG GT3 Evo	Mercedes-AMG M159 6.2 L V8	4	(France) Sebastien Baud	P	2
(United Arab Emirates) Abu Dhabi Racing by HRT Bilstein	Mercedes-AMG GT3 Evo	Mercedes-AMG M159 6.2 L V8	4	(Andorra) Jules Gounon	P	2
(United Arab Emirates) Abu Dhabi Racing by HRT Bilstein	Mercedes-AMG GT3 Evo	Mercedes-AMG M159 6.2 L V8	4	(Germany) Hubert Haupt	P	2
(Oman) Al Manar Racing by HRT	Mercedes-AMG GT3 Evo	Mercedes-AMG M159 6.2 L V8	777	(Oman) Al Faisal Al Zubair	P	2
(Oman) Al Manar Racing by HRT	Mercedes-AMG GT3 Evo	Mercedes-AMG M159 6.2 L V8	777	(Zimbabwe) Axcil Jefferies	P	2
(Oman) Al Manar Racing by HRT	Mercedes-AMG GT3 Evo	Mercedes-AMG M159 6.2 L V8	777	(Austria) Martin Konrad	P	2
(Oman) Al Manar Racing by HRT	Mercedes-AMG GT3 Evo	Mercedes-AMG M159 6.2 L V8	777	(Germany) Fabian Schiller	P	2
(Oman) Al Manar Racing by HRT	Mercedes-AMG GT3 Evo	Mercedes-AMG M159 6.2 L V8	777	(Germany) Luca Stolz	P	2
(Saudi Arabia) MS7 by Team WRT	BMW M4 GT3	BMW S58B30T0 3.0 L Turbo I6	7	(Saudi Arabia) Mohammed Bin Saud Al Saud	P	2
(Saudi Arabia) MS7 by Team WRT	BMW M4 GT3	BMW S58B30T0 3.0 L Turbo I6	7	(Germany) Jens Klingmann	P	2
(Saudi Arabia) MS7 by Team WRT	BMW M4 GT3	BMW S58B30T0 3.0 L Turbo I6	7	(Mexico) Diego Menchaca	P	2
(Saudi Arabia) MS7 by Team WRT	BMW M4 GT3	BMW S58B30T0 3.0 L Turbo I6	7	(France) Jean-Baptiste Simmenauer	P	2
(Saudi Arabia) MS7 by Team WRT	BMW M4 GT3	BMW S58B30T0 3.0 L Turbo I6	7	(Belgium) Dries Vanthoor	P	2
(Italy) KFC VR46 Team WRT	BMW M4 GT3	BMW S58B30T0 3.0 L Turbo I6	46	(Indonesia) Sean Gelael	P	2
(Italy) KFC VR46 Team WRT	BMW M4 GT3	BMW S58B30T0 3.0 L Turbo I6	46	(Germany) Max Hesse	P	2
(Italy) KFC VR46 Team WRT	BMW M4 GT3	BMW S58B30T0 3.0 L Turbo I6	46	(Belgium) Maxime Martin	P	2
(Italy) KFC VR46 Team WRT	BMW M4 GT3	BMW S58B30T0 3.0 L Turbo I6	46	(Italy) Valentino Rossi	P	2
(Italy) KFC VR46 Team WRT	BMW M4 GT3	BMW S58B30T0 3.0 L Turbo I6	46	(United Kingdom) Tim Whale	P	2
(Australia) EBM – Grove Racing	Porsche 911 GT3 R	Porsche 4.0 L Flat-6	10	(New Zealand) Earl Bamber	P	2
(Australia) EBM – Grove Racing	Porsche 911 GT3 R	Porsche 4.0 L Flat-6	10	(Australia) Brenton Grove	P	2
(Australia) EBM – Grove Racing	Porsche 911 GT3 R	Porsche 4.0 L Flat-6	10	(Australia) Stephen Grove	P	2
(Australia) EBM – Grove Racing	Porsche 911 GT3 R	Porsche 4.0 L Flat-6	10	(Australia) Anton de Pasquale	P	2
(Netherlands) JR Motorsport	BMW M6 GT3	BMW 4.4 L Turbo V8	12	(Netherlands) Ted van Vliet		3
(Netherlands) JR Motorsport	BMW M6 GT3	BMW 4.4 L Turbo V8	12	(Netherlands) Max Weering		3
(Denmark) Poulsen Motorsport	BMW M4 GT3	BMW S58B30T0 3.0 L Turbo V8	14	(Denmark) Gustav Birch	PA	2
(Denmark) Poulsen Motorsport	BMW M4 GT3	BMW S58B30T0 3.0 L Turbo V8	14	(Denmark) Kasper H. Jensen	PA	2
(Denmark) Poulsen Motorsport	BMW M4 GT3	BMW S58B30T0 3.0 L Turbo V8	14	(Denmark) Kristian Poulsen	PA	2
(Denmark) Poulsen Motorsport	BMW M4 GT3	BMW S58B30T0 3.0 L Turbo V8	14	(Denmark) Roland Poulsen	PA	2
(Netherlands) MP Motorsport	Mercedes-AMG GT3 Evo	Mercedes-AMG M159 6.2 L V8	19	(Netherlands) Bert de Heus	PA	2
(Netherlands) MP Motorsport	Mercedes-AMG GT3 Evo	Mercedes-AMG M159 6.2 L V8	19	(Netherlands) Daniël de Jong	PA	2
(Netherlands) MP Motorsport	Mercedes-AMG GT3 Evo	Mercedes-AMG M159 6.2 L V8	19	(Netherlands) Henk de Jong	PA	2
(Netherlands) MP Motorsport	Mercedes-AMG GT3 Evo	Mercedes-AMG M159 6.2 L V8	19	(Netherlands) Jaap van Lagen	PA	2
(Antigua and Barbuda) HAAS RT	Audi R8 LMS Evo II	Audi 5.2 L V10	21	(Belgium) Mathieu Detry	P	2–3
(Antigua and Barbuda) HAAS RT	Audi R8 LMS Evo II	Audi 5.2 L V10	21	(Belgium) Maxime Soulet	P	2–3
(Antigua and Barbuda) HAAS RT	Audi R8 LMS Evo II	Audi 5.2 L V10	21	(Belgium) Olivier Bertels	P	2
(Antigua and Barbuda) HAAS RT	Audi R8 LMS Evo II	Audi 5.2 L V10	21	(Germany) Benjamin Mazatis	P	2
(Antigua and Barbuda) HAAS RT	Audi R8 LMS Evo II	Audi 5.2 L V10	21	(Belgium) Frédéric Vervisch	P	2
(Antigua and Barbuda) HAAS RT	Audi R8 LMS Evo II	Audi 5.2 L V10	21	(France) Stéphane Perrin	P	3
(France) Saintéloc Racing	Audi R8 LMS Evo II	Audi 5.2 L V10	26	(France) Erwan Bastard	P	2
(France) Saintéloc Racing	Audi R8 LMS Evo II	Audi 5.2 L V10	26	(France) Grégoire Demoustier	P	2
(France) Saintéloc Racing	Audi R8 LMS Evo II	Audi 5.2 L V10	26	(France) Antoine Doquin	P	2
(France) Saintéloc Racing	Audi R8 LMS Evo II	Audi 5.2 L V10	26	(France) Simon Gachet	P	2
(France) Saintéloc Racing	Audi R8 LMS Evo II	Audi 5.2 L V10	26	(Belgium) Christian Kelders	P	2
(United States) Heart of Racing Team by SPS	Mercedes-AMG GT3 Evo	Mercedes-AMG M159 6.2 L V8	27	(Canada) Roman De Angelis	PA	2
(United States) Heart of Racing Team by SPS	Mercedes-AMG GT3 Evo	Mercedes-AMG M159 6.2 L V8	27	(United Kingdom) Ross Gunn	PA	2
(United States) Heart of Racing Team by SPS	Mercedes-AMG GT3 Evo	Mercedes-AMG M159 6.2 L V8	27	(United Kingdom) Ian James	PA	2
(United States) Heart of Racing Team by SPS	Mercedes-AMG GT3 Evo	Mercedes-AMG M159 6.2 L V8	27	(United States) Gray Newell	PA	2
(Netherlands) Team GP-Elite	Porsche 911 GT3 R	Porsche 4.0 L Flat-6	32	(Netherlands) Lucas Groeneveld	P	1–2
(Netherlands) Team GP-Elite	Porsche 911 GT3 R	Porsche 4.0 L Flat-6	32	(Netherlands) Daan van Kuijk	P	1–2
(Netherlands) Team GP-Elite	Porsche 911 GT3 R	Porsche 4.0 L Flat-6	32	(Netherlands) Jesse van Kuijk	P	1–2
(Netherlands) Team GP-Elite	Porsche 911 GT3 R	Porsche 4.0 L Flat-6	32	(Netherlands) Max van Splunteren	P	2
(United Kingdom) OnlyFans Racing With P1 Groupe By MRS	Porsche 911 GT3 R	Porsche 4.0 L Flat-6	43	(Finland) Jukka Honkavuori	PA	2
(United Kingdom) OnlyFans Racing With P1 Groupe By MRS	Porsche 911 GT3 R	Porsche 4.0 L Flat-6	43	(Germany) Leon Köhler	PA	2
(United Kingdom) OnlyFans Racing With P1 Groupe By MRS	Porsche 911 GT3 R	Porsche 4.0 L Flat-6	43	(United Kingdom) Alex Sedgwick	PA	2
(United Kingdom) OnlyFans Racing With P1 Groupe By MRS	Porsche 911 GT3 R	Porsche 4.0 L Flat-6	43	(United States) Alex Vogel	PA	2
Team Kuwait by MRS GT-Racing	Porsche 911 GT3 R	Porsche 4.0 L Flat-6	47	(Kuwait) Ahmad Al Ghanem	P	1
Team Kuwait by MRS GT-Racing	Porsche 911 GT3 R	Porsche 4.0 L Flat-6	47	(Kuwait) Mohammed Al Kazemi	P	1
Team Kuwait by MRS GT-Racing	Porsche 911 GT3 R	Porsche 4.0 L Flat-6	47	(Kuwait) Zaid Ashkanani	P	1
(Slovakia) ARC Bratislava	Lamborghini Huracán GT3 1 Lamborghini Huracán GT3 Evo 3	Lamborghini 5.2 L V10	44	(Slovakia) Miro Konôpka	Am	1, 3
(Slovakia) ARC Bratislava	Lamborghini Huracán GT3 1 Lamborghini Huracán GT3 Evo 3	Lamborghini 5.2 L V10	44	(Slovakia) Matej Konôpka	Am	1
(Slovakia) ARC Bratislava	Lamborghini Huracán GT3 1 Lamborghini Huracán GT3 Evo 3	Lamborghini 5.2 L V10	44	(Slovakia) Zdeno Mikulasko	Am	1
(Slovakia) ARC Bratislava	Lamborghini Huracán GT3 1 Lamborghini Huracán GT3 Evo 3	Lamborghini 5.2 L V10	44	(Poland) Andrzej Lewandowski	Am	3
(United Arab Emirates) S’Aalocin by Kox Racing	Porsche 911 GT3 R	Porsche 4.0 L Flat-6	48	(Netherlands) Tom Boonen	Am	2
(United Arab Emirates) S’Aalocin by Kox Racing	Porsche 911 GT3 R	Porsche 4.0 L Flat-6	48	(Netherlands) Peter Kox	Am	2
(United Arab Emirates) S’Aalocin by Kox Racing	Porsche 911 GT3 R	Porsche 4.0 L Flat-6	48	(Netherlands) Stéphane Kox	Am	2
(United Arab Emirates) S’Aalocin by Kox Racing	Porsche 911 GT3 R	Porsche 4.0 L Flat-6	48	(Netherlands) Nico Pronk	Am	2
(United Arab Emirates) S’Aalocin by Kox Racing	Porsche 911 GT3 R	Porsche 4.0 L Flat-6	48	(Netherlands) Dennis Retera	Am	2
(United Kingdom) 7TSIX	McLaren 720S GT3	McLaren M840T 4.0 L Turbo V8	76	(United Kingdom) James Cottingham	Am	2
(United Kingdom) 7TSIX	McLaren 720S GT3	McLaren M840T 4.0 L Turbo V8	76	(United Kingdom) Andrew Gilbert-Scott	Am	2
(United Kingdom) 7TSIX	McLaren 720S GT3	McLaren M840T 4.0 L Turbo V8	76	(Spain) Fran Rueda	Am	2
(United Kingdom) 7TSIX	McLaren 720S GT3	McLaren M840T 4.0 L Turbo V8	76	(Slovakia) Matúš Výboh	Am	2
(United States) CP Racing	Mercedes-AMG GT3 Evo	Mercedes-AMG M159 6.2 L V8	85	(United States) Charles Espenlaub	Am	1–2
(United States) CP Racing	Mercedes-AMG GT3 Evo	Mercedes-AMG M159 6.2 L V8	85	(United States) Joe Foster	Am	1–2
(United States) CP Racing	Mercedes-AMG GT3 Evo	Mercedes-AMG M159 6.2 L V8	85	(United States) Shane Lewis	Am	1–2
(United States) CP Racing	Mercedes-AMG GT3 Evo	Mercedes-AMG M159 6.2 L V8	85	(United States) Charles Putman	Am	1–2
(United States) CP Racing	Mercedes-AMG GT3 Evo	Mercedes-AMG M159 6.2 L V8	85	(United Kingdom) Phil Quaife	Am	2
(Germany) Lionspeed by Herberth Motorsport	Porsche 911 GT3 R	Porsche 4.0 L Flat-6	91	(Switzerland) Daniel Allemann	PA	2
(Germany) Lionspeed by Herberth Motorsport	Porsche 911 GT3 R	Porsche 4.0 L Flat-6	91	(Germany) Ralf Bohn	PA	2
(Germany) Lionspeed by Herberth Motorsport	Porsche 911 GT3 R	Porsche 4.0 L Flat-6	91	(Germany) Alfred Renauer	PA	2
(Germany) Lionspeed by Herberth Motorsport	Porsche 911 GT3 R	Porsche 4.0 L Flat-6	91	(Germany) Robert Renauer	PA	2
(Germany) Lionspeed by Herberth Motorsport	Porsche 911 GT3 R	Porsche 4.0 L Flat-6	91	(Germany) Felix Neuhofer	P	3
(Germany) Lionspeed by Herberth Motorsport	Porsche 911 GT3 R	Porsche 4.0 L Flat-6	91	(Germany) Markus Neuhofer	P	3
(Germany) Lionspeed by Herberth Motorsport	Porsche 911 GT3 R	Porsche 4.0 L Flat-6	91	(Germany) Alfred Renauer	P	3
(Germany) Lionspeed by Herberth Motorsport	Porsche 911 GT3 R	Porsche 4.0 L Flat-6	91	(Germany) Robert Renauer	P	3
(Germany) Herberth Motorsport	Porsche 911 GT3 R	Porsche 4.0 L Flat-6	92	(United States) Adam Adelson	P	2
(Germany) Herberth Motorsport	Porsche 911 GT3 R	Porsche 4.0 L Flat-6	92	(United States) Jason Hart	P	2
(Germany) Herberth Motorsport	Porsche 911 GT3 R	Porsche 4.0 L Flat-6	92	(United States) Seth Lucas	P	2
(Germany) Herberth Motorsport	Porsche 911 GT3 R	Porsche 4.0 L Flat-6	92	(United States) Elliott Skeer	P	2
(Italy) Tresor by Attempto Racing	Audi R8 LMS Evo	Audi 5.2 L V10	99	(Germany) Alex Aka	P	2
(Italy) Tresor by Attempto Racing	Audi R8 LMS Evo	Audi 5.2 L V10	99	(United Kingdom) Finlay Hutchison	P	2
(Italy) Tresor by Attempto Racing	Audi R8 LMS Evo	Audi 5.2 L V10	99	(Fédération Internationale de l'Automobile) Andrey Mukovoz (Note: Andrey Mukovoz, Roman Mavlanov and Andrey Solukovtsev are Russian, but competes as a neutral competitor using the Fédération Internationale de l'Automobile flag as Belarusian and Russian national emblems were banned by the association due to the Russian invasion of Ukraine.)	P	2
(Italy) Tresor by Attempto Racing	Audi R8 LMS Evo	Audi 5.2 L V10	99	(Luxembourg) Dylan Pereira	P	2
(Lithuania) Pure Rxcing	Porsche 911 GT3 R	Porsche 4.0 L Flat-6	911	(United Kingdom) Harry King	P	2–3
(Lithuania) Pure Rxcing	Porsche 911 GT3 R	Porsche 4.0 L Flat-6	911	(United Kingdom) Alex Malykhin (Note: Alex Malykhin is Belarusian, but competes under a British Licence as Belarusian and Russian national emblems were banned by the association due to the Russian invasion of Ukraine.)	P	2–3
(Lithuania) Pure Rxcing	Porsche 911 GT3 R	Porsche 4.0 L Flat-6	911	(Germany) Joel Sturm	P	2–3
(Lithuania) Pure Rxcing	Porsche 911 GT3 R	Porsche 4.0 L Flat-6	911	(Germany) Sven Müller	P	2
GTX
(France) Vortex V8	Vortex 1.0 GTX	Chevrolet 6.2 L V8	701	(France) Lionel Amrouche	All	
(France) Vortex V8	Vortex 1.0 GTX	Chevrolet 6.2 L V8	701	(France) Philippe Bonnel	All	
(France) Vortex V8	Vortex 1.0 GTX	Chevrolet 6.2 L V8	701	(Switzerland) Nicolas Nobs	1	
(France) Vortex V8	Vortex 1.0 GTX	Chevrolet 6.2 L V8	701	(France) Philippe Gruau	2	
(France) Vortex V8	Vortex 1.0 GTX	Chevrolet 6.2 L V8	701	(France) Tom Pieri	2	
(France) Vortex V8	Vortex 1.0 GTX	Chevrolet 6.2 L V8	701	(France) Julien Boillot	3	
(France) Vortex V8	Vortex 1.0 GTX	Chevrolet 6.2 L V8	702	(France) Philippe Fertoret	2	
(France) Vortex V8	Vortex 1.0 GTX	Chevrolet 6.2 L V8	702	(France) Miguel Moiola	2	
(France) Vortex V8	Vortex 1.0 GTX	Chevrolet 6.2 L V8	702	(Switzerland) Nicolas Nobs	2	
(France) Vortex V8	Vortex 1.0 GTX	Chevrolet 6.2 L V8	702	(France) Lucas Sugliano	2	
(Germany) Leipert Motorsport	Lamborghini Huracán Super Trofeo Evo	Lamborghini 5.2 L V10	710	(United States) Gregg Gorski	1, 3	
(Germany) Leipert Motorsport	Lamborghini Huracán Super Trofeo Evo	Lamborghini 5.2 L V10	710	(United States) Jean-Francois Brunot	1	
(Germany) Leipert Motorsport	Lamborghini Huracán Super Trofeo Evo	Lamborghini 5.2 L V10	710	(China) Kerong Li	1	
(Germany) Leipert Motorsport	Lamborghini Huracán Super Trofeo Evo	Lamborghini 5.2 L V10	710	(United States) Josh Hansen	3	
(Germany) Leipert Motorsport	Lamborghini Huracán Super Trofeo Evo	Lamborghini 5.2 L V10	710	(Germany) Jürgen Krebs	3	
(Austria) Razoon – More than Racing	KTM X-Bow GT2 Concept	Audi 2.5 L I5	714	(Austria) Daniel Drexel	All	
(Austria) Razoon – More than Racing	KTM X-Bow GT2 Concept	Audi 2.5 L I5	714	(Austria) Dominik Olbert	1, 3	
(Austria) Razoon – More than Racing	KTM X-Bow GT2 Concept	Audi 2.5 L I5	714	(Kuwait) Haytham Qarajouli	1, 3	
(Austria) Razoon – More than Racing	KTM X-Bow GT2 Concept	Audi 2.5 L I5	714	(Austria) Bob Bau	2	
(Austria) Razoon – More than Racing	KTM X-Bow GT2 Concept	Audi 2.5 L I5	714	(Austria) Ernst Kirchmayr	2	
(Austria) Razoon – More than Racing	KTM X-Bow GT2 Concept	Audi 2.5 L I5	714	(Austria) Leo Pichler	2	
(Austria) Razoon – More than Racing	KTM X-Bow GT2 Concept	Audi 2.5 L I5	714	(Austria) Kris Rosenberger	2	
(Portugal) P21 Motorsport	Porsche 991 GT3 II Cup	Porsche 4.0 L Flat-6	721	(United Kingdom) Chris Hillaby	3	
(Portugal) P21 Motorsport	Porsche 991 GT3 II Cup	Porsche 4.0 L Flat-6	721	(Portugal) José Monroy	3	
(Portugal) P21 Motorsport	Porsche 991 GT3 II Cup	Porsche 4.0 L Flat-6	721	(Portugal) Rui Miritta	3	
(Germany) Tischner Motorsport	Porsche 991 GT3 II Cup	Porsche 4.0 L Flat-6	763	(Germany) Uwe Kleen	3	
(Germany) Tischner Motorsport	Porsche 991 GT3 II Cup	Porsche 4.0 L Flat-6	763	(Germany) Matthias Tischner	3	
(Germany) Tischner Motorsport	Porsche 991 GT3 II Cup	Porsche 4.0 L Flat-6	763	(Germany) Michael Tischner	3	
992
(Luxembourg) SebLajoux Racing by DUWO Racing	Porsche 992 GT3 Cup	Porsche 4.0 L Flat-6	907	(France) Alexandre de Bernardinis	Am	2
(Luxembourg) SebLajoux Racing by DUWO Racing	Porsche 992 GT3 Cup	Porsche 4.0 L Flat-6	907	(Switzerland) Gislain Genecand	Am	2
(Luxembourg) SebLajoux Racing by DUWO Racing	Porsche 992 GT3 Cup	Porsche 4.0 L Flat-6	907	(France) Xavier Michel	Am	2
(Luxembourg) SebLajoux Racing by DUWO Racing	Porsche 992 GT3 Cup	Porsche 4.0 L Flat-6	907	(France) Gabriel Pemeant	Am	2
(Luxembourg) SebLajoux Racing by DUWO Racing	Porsche 992 GT3 Cup	Porsche 4.0 L Flat-6	908	(France) Jean-Christophe David	Am	2
(Luxembourg) SebLajoux Racing by DUWO Racing	Porsche 992 GT3 Cup	Porsche 4.0 L Flat-6	908	(France) Mathys Jaubert	Am	2
(Luxembourg) SebLajoux Racing by DUWO Racing	Porsche 992 GT3 Cup	Porsche 4.0 L Flat-6	908	(France) Sebastien Lajoux	Am	2
(Luxembourg) SebLajoux Racing by DUWO Racing	Porsche 992 GT3 Cup	Porsche 4.0 L Flat-6	908	(France) Lionel Rigaud	Am	2
(Netherlands) Red Camel-Jordans.nl	Porsche 992 GT3 Cup	Porsche 4.0 L Flat-6	909	(Netherlands) Ivo Breukers	P	All
(Netherlands) Red Camel-Jordans.nl	Porsche 992 GT3 Cup	Porsche 4.0 L Flat-6	909	(Netherlands) Luc Breukers	P	All
(Netherlands) Red Camel-Jordans.nl	Porsche 992 GT3 Cup	Porsche 4.0 L Flat-6	909	(Netherlands) Rik Breukers	P	All
(Netherlands) Red Camel-Jordans.nl	Porsche 992 GT3 Cup	Porsche 4.0 L Flat-6	909	(Switzerland) Fabian Danz	P	2
(Germany) Huber Racing	Porsche 992 GT3 Cup	Porsche 4.0 L Flat-6	925	(Germany) Stefan Aust	Am	2
(Germany) Huber Racing	Porsche 992 GT3 Cup	Porsche 4.0 L Flat-6	925	(Germany) Steffen Görig	Am	2
(Germany) Huber Racing	Porsche 992 GT3 Cup	Porsche 4.0 L Flat-6	925	(Germany) Klaus Rader	Am	2
(Germany) Huber Racing	Porsche 992 GT3 Cup	Porsche 4.0 L Flat-6	925	(Germany) Hans Wehrmann	Am	2
(Germany) / HRT Performance (Note: Car No. 928 entered as HRT Performance at Rounds 1 & 3 and as NKPP by HRT Performance at Round 2); (Germany) / NKPP by HRT Performance	Porsche 992 GT3 Cup	Porsche 4.0 L Flat-6	928	(Netherlands) Gijs Bessem	Am	1–2
(Germany) / HRT Performance; (Germany) / NKPP by HRT Performance	Porsche 992 GT3 Cup	Porsche 4.0 L Flat-6	928	(Netherlands) Harry Hilders	Am	1–2
(Germany) / HRT Performance; (Germany) / NKPP by HRT Performance	Porsche 992 GT3 Cup	Porsche 4.0 L Flat-6	928	(Germany) Kim Andre Hauschild	Am	1
(Germany) / HRT Performance; (Germany) / NKPP by HRT Performance	Porsche 992 GT3 Cup	Porsche 4.0 L Flat-6	928	(Netherlands) Mark van der Aa	Am	2
(Germany) / HRT Performance; (Germany) / NKPP by HRT Performance	Porsche 992 GT3 Cup	Porsche 4.0 L Flat-6	928	(Netherlands) Bob Herber	Am	2
(Germany) / HRT Performance; (Germany) / NKPP by HRT Performance	Porsche 992 GT3 Cup	Porsche 4.0 L Flat-6	928	(Finland) Miika Panu	Am	3
(Germany) / HRT Performance; (Germany) / NKPP by HRT Performance	Porsche 992 GT3 Cup	Porsche 4.0 L Flat-6	928	(Finland) Jim Rautiainen	Am	3
[[QMMF|]] QMMF Racing by HRT Thuraya Qatar	Porsche 992 GT3 Cup	Porsche 4.0 L Flat-6	929	(Qatar) Abdulla Ali Al-Khelaifi	Am	All
[[QMMF|]] QMMF Racing by HRT Thuraya Qatar	Porsche 992 GT3 Cup	Porsche 4.0 L Flat-6	929	(Qatar) Ibrahim Al-Mannai	Am	1
[[QMMF|]] QMMF Racing by HRT Thuraya Qatar	Porsche 992 GT3 Cup	Porsche 4.0 L Flat-6	929	(Denmark) Anders Fjordbach	Am	1
[[QMMF|]] QMMF Racing by HRT Thuraya Qatar	Porsche 992 GT3 Cup	Porsche 4.0 L Flat-6	929	(Qatar) Hamad Saeed Al Asam	Am	1
[[QMMF|]] QMMF Racing by HRT Thuraya Qatar	Porsche 992 GT3 Cup	Porsche 4.0 L Flat-6	929	(Qatar) Ghanim Ali Al Maadheed	Am	2–3
[[QMMF|]] QMMF Racing by HRT Thuraya Qatar	Porsche 992 GT3 Cup	Porsche 4.0 L Flat-6	929	(Qatar) Ibrahim Al-Abdulghani	Am	2–3
[[QMMF|]] QMMF Racing by HRT Thuraya Qatar	Porsche 992 GT3 Cup	Porsche 4.0 L Flat-6	929	(Germany) Julian Hanses	Am	2–3
QMMF by HRT Suhail Qatar (Note: Car No. 930 entered as QMMF by HRT Suhail Qatar at Rounds 1 & 2 and as HRT Performance at Round 3) (Germany) HRT Performance	Porsche 992 GT3 Cup	Porsche 4.0 L Flat-6	930	(Qatar) Abdullah Al Abbasi	Am	1–2
QMMF by HRT Suhail Qatar (Germany) HRT Performance	Porsche 992 GT3 Cup	Porsche 4.0 L Flat-6	930	(Qatar) Ghanim Ali Al Maadheed	Am	1
QMMF by HRT Suhail Qatar (Germany) HRT Performance	Porsche 992 GT3 Cup	Porsche 4.0 L Flat-6	930	(Qatar) Ibrahim Al-Abdulghani	Am	1
QMMF by HRT Suhail Qatar (Germany) HRT Performance	Porsche 992 GT3 Cup	Porsche 4.0 L Flat-6	930	(Germany) Kim Andre Hauschild	Am	1
QMMF by HRT Suhail Qatar (Germany) HRT Performance	Porsche 992 GT3 Cup	Porsche 4.0 L Flat-6	930	(Qatar) Abdulaziz Al Jabri	Am	2
QMMF by HRT Suhail Qatar (Germany) HRT Performance	Porsche 992 GT3 Cup	Porsche 4.0 L Flat-6	930	(Qatar) Ibrahim Al-Mannai	Am	2
QMMF by HRT Suhail Qatar (Germany) HRT Performance	Porsche 992 GT3 Cup	Porsche 4.0 L Flat-6	930	(Sweden) Daniel Roos	Am	2
QMMF by HRT Suhail Qatar (Germany) HRT Performance	Porsche 992 GT3 Cup	Porsche 4.0 L Flat-6	930	(Finland) Antti Buri	P	3
QMMF by HRT Suhail Qatar (Germany) HRT Performance	Porsche 992 GT3 Cup	Porsche 4.0 L Flat-6	930	(Finland) Kari-Pekka Laaksonen	P	3
(Germany) HRT Performance	Porsche 992 GT3 Cup	Porsche 4.0 L Flat-6	931	(United States) Gregg Gorski	Am	2
(Germany) HRT Performance	Porsche 992 GT3 Cup	Porsche 4.0 L Flat-6	931	(Germany) Holger Harmsen	Am	2
(Germany) HRT Performance	Porsche 992 GT3 Cup	Porsche 4.0 L Flat-6	931	(Germany) Fidel Leib	Am	2
(Germany) HRT Performance	Porsche 992 GT3 Cup	Porsche 4.0 L Flat-6	931	(South Africa) Mikael Pitamber	Am	2
(Germany) HRT Performance	Porsche 992 GT3 Cup	Porsche 4.0 L Flat-6	931	(Germany) Fidel Leib	P	3
(Germany) HRT Performance	Porsche 992 GT3 Cup	Porsche 4.0 L Flat-6	931	(South Africa) Mikael Pitamber	P	3
(Germany) HRT Performance	Porsche 992 GT3 Cup	Porsche 4.0 L Flat-6	932	(France) Stéphane Adler	Am	2
(Germany) HRT Performance	Porsche 992 GT3 Cup	Porsche 4.0 L Flat-6	932	(France) Michael Blanchemain	Am	2
(Germany) HRT Performance	Porsche 992 GT3 Cup	Porsche 4.0 L Flat-6	932	(France) Jérôme Da Costa	Am	2
(Germany) HRT Performance	Porsche 992 GT3 Cup	Porsche 4.0 L Flat-6	932	(France) Franck Leherpeur	Am	2
(Romania) Willi Motorsport by Ebimotors	Porsche 992 GT3 Cup	Porsche 4.0 L Flat-6	955	(Italy) Fabrizio Broggi	P	All
(Romania) Willi Motorsport by Ebimotors	Porsche 992 GT3 Cup	Porsche 4.0 L Flat-6	955	(Italy) Sabino de Castro	P	All
(Romania) Willi Motorsport by Ebimotors	Porsche 992 GT3 Cup	Porsche 4.0 L Flat-6	955	(Romania) Sergiu Nicolae	P	All
(Switzerland) Fach Auto Tech	Porsche 992 GT3 Cup	Porsche 4.0 L Flat-6	961	(Switzerland) Alexander Fach	P	2
(Switzerland) Fach Auto Tech	Porsche 992 GT3 Cup	Porsche 4.0 L Flat-6	961	(Switzerland) Peter Hegglin	P	2
(Switzerland) Fach Auto Tech	Porsche 992 GT3 Cup	Porsche 4.0 L Flat-6	961	(Switzerland) Jan Klingelnberg	P	2
(Switzerland) Fach Auto Tech	Porsche 992 GT3 Cup	Porsche 4.0 L Flat-6	961	(Germany) Christof Langer	P	2
(Switzerland) Fach Auto Tech	Porsche 992 GT3 Cup	Porsche 4.0 L Flat-6	961	(Switzerland) Christopher Zöchling	P	2
(Switzerland) Fach Auto Tech	Porsche 992 GT3 Cup	Porsche 4.0 L Flat-6	962	(Netherlands) Huub van Eijndhoven	P	2
(Switzerland) Fach Auto Tech	Porsche 992 GT3 Cup	Porsche 4.0 L Flat-6	962	(Germany) Matthias Hoffsümmer	P	2
(Switzerland) Fach Auto Tech	Porsche 992 GT3 Cup	Porsche 4.0 L Flat-6	962	(Italy) Gabriele Rindone	P	2
(Switzerland) Fach Auto Tech	Porsche 992 GT3 Cup	Porsche 4.0 L Flat-6	962	(Germany) Alexander Schwarzer	P	2
(Switzerland) Fach Auto Tech	Porsche 992 GT3 Cup	Porsche 4.0 L Flat-6	962	(Netherlands) Larry ten Voorde	P	2
(United Arab Emirates) RABDAN Motorsports	Porsche 992 GT3 Cup	Porsche 4.0 L Flat-6	977	(United Arab Emirates) Saif Al Ameri	P	2–3
(United Arab Emirates) RABDAN Motorsports	Porsche 992 GT3 Cup	Porsche 4.0 L Flat-6	977	(United Arab Emirates) Salem Al Ketbi	P	2–3
(United Arab Emirates) RABDAN Motorsports	Porsche 992 GT3 Cup	Porsche 4.0 L Flat-6	977	(United Arab Emirates) Helal Ali Mazrouei	P	2–3
(United Arab Emirates) RABDAN Motorsports	Porsche 992 GT3 Cup	Porsche 4.0 L Flat-6	977	(United Arab Emirates) Saeed Al Mehairi	P	2–3
(Belgium) / Speed Lover by RABDAN (Note: Car No. 979 entered as Speed Lover by RABDAN from Round 1 and as Speed Lover at Round 2 onwards.); (Belgium) / Speed Lover	Porsche 992 GT3 Cup	Porsche 4.0 L Flat-6	979	(Belgium) Olivier Dons	Am	1, 3
(Belgium) / Speed Lover by RABDAN; (Belgium) / Speed Lover	Porsche 992 GT3 Cup	Porsche 4.0 L Flat-6	979	(United Arab Emirates) Saif Al Ameri	Am	1
(Belgium) / Speed Lover by RABDAN; (Belgium) / Speed Lover	Porsche 992 GT3 Cup	Porsche 4.0 L Flat-6	979	(United Arab Emirates) Saeed Al Mehairi	Am	1
(Belgium) / Speed Lover by RABDAN; (Belgium) / Speed Lover	Porsche 992 GT3 Cup	Porsche 4.0 L Flat-6	979	(Belgium) Simon Balcaen	Am	2
(Belgium) / Speed Lover by RABDAN; (Belgium) / Speed Lover	Porsche 992 GT3 Cup	Porsche 4.0 L Flat-6	979	(Belgium) Chris Maes	Am	2
(Belgium) / Speed Lover by RABDAN; (Belgium) / Speed Lover	Porsche 992 GT3 Cup	Porsche 4.0 L Flat-6	979	(France) Steven Palette	Am	2
(Belgium) / Speed Lover by RABDAN; (Belgium) / Speed Lover	Porsche 992 GT3 Cup	Porsche 4.0 L Flat-6	979	(Belgium) Philippe Wils	Am	2
(Belgium) / Speed Lover by RABDAN; (Belgium) / Speed Lover	Porsche 992 GT3 Cup	Porsche 4.0 L Flat-6	979	(Belgium) Jean-Michel Gerome	Am	3
(Belgium) / Speed Lover by RABDAN; (Belgium) / Speed Lover	Porsche 992 GT3 Cup	Porsche 4.0 L Flat-6	979	(France) Eric Mouez	Am	3
(Estonia) ALM Motorsport by MRS GT-Racing	Porsche 992 GT3 Cup	Porsche 4.0 L Flat-6	988	(Lithuania) Sigitas Ambrazevicius	Am	2
(Estonia) ALM Motorsport by MRS GT-Racing	Porsche 992 GT3 Cup	Porsche 4.0 L Flat-6	988	(Lithuania) Arunas Geciauskas	Am	2
(Estonia) ALM Motorsport by MRS GT-Racing	Porsche 992 GT3 Cup	Porsche 4.0 L Flat-6	988	(Sweden) Kjelle Lejonkrans	Am	2
(Estonia) ALM Motorsport by MRS GT-Racing	Porsche 992 GT3 Cup	Porsche 4.0 L Flat-6	988	(Estonia) Antti Rammo	Am	2
(Germany) MRS GT-Racing	Porsche 992 GT3 Cup	Porsche 4.0 L Flat-6	989	(Kazakhstan) Alexandr Artemyev	P	2
(Germany) MRS GT-Racing	Porsche 992 GT3 Cup	Porsche 4.0 L Flat-6	989	(Belgium) Rodrigue Gillion	P	2
(Germany) MRS GT-Racing	Porsche 992 GT3 Cup	Porsche 4.0 L Flat-6	989	(Fédération Internationale de l'Automobile) Andrey Solukovtsev	P	2
(Germany) MRS GT-Racing	Porsche 992 GT3 Cup	Porsche 4.0 L Flat-6	989	(Mexico) Rafael Vallina	P	2
(Germany) MRS GT-Racing	Porsche 992 GT3 Cup	Porsche 4.0 L Flat-6	989	(Belgium) Nico Verdonck	P	2
(Germany) MRS GT-Racing	Porsche 992 GT3 Cup	Porsche 4.0 L Flat-6	990	(Germany) Andreas Gülden	P	2
(Germany) MRS GT-Racing	Porsche 992 GT3 Cup	Porsche 4.0 L Flat-6	990	(Germany) Marc Hennerici	P	2
(Germany) MRS GT-Racing	Porsche 992 GT3 Cup	Porsche 4.0 L Flat-6	990	(Germany) Alex Herbst	P	2
(Germany) MRS GT-Racing	Porsche 992 GT3 Cup	Porsche 4.0 L Flat-6	990	(United States) Peter Pejacsevich	P	2
(United Kingdom) Duel Racing with Toro Verde GT	Porsche 992 GT3 Cup	Porsche 4.0 L Flat-6	995	(United Kingdom) Phil Keen	P	2
(United Kingdom) Duel Racing with Toro Verde GT	Porsche 992 GT3 Cup	Porsche 4.0 L Flat-6	995	(United Arab Emirates) Nabil Moutran	P	2
(United Kingdom) Duel Racing with Toro Verde GT	Porsche 992 GT3 Cup	Porsche 4.0 L Flat-6	995	(United Arab Emirates) Ramzi Moutran	P	2
(United Kingdom) Duel Racing with Toro Verde GT	Porsche 992 GT3 Cup	Porsche 4.0 L Flat-6	995	(United Arab Emirates) Sami Moutran	P	2
GT4
(United Kingdom) RAM Racing	Mercedes-AMG GT4	Mercedes-AMG M178 4.0 L V8	405	(United Kingdom) Phil Keen	3	
(United Kingdom) RAM Racing	Mercedes-AMG GT4	Mercedes-AMG M178 4.0 L V8	405	(United Kingdom) Phil Quaife	3	
(United Kingdom) RAM Racing	Mercedes-AMG GT4	Mercedes-AMG M178 4.0 L V8	405	(United Kingdom) James Thorpe	3	
(United Kingdom) ROFGO with Dragon Racing	Mercedes-AMG GT4	Mercedes-AMG M178 4.0 L V8	408	(Denmark) Benjamin Goethe	2	
(United Kingdom) ROFGO with Dragon Racing	Mercedes-AMG GT4	Mercedes-AMG M178 4.0 L V8	408	(Germany) Oliver Goethe	2	
(United Kingdom) ROFGO with Dragon Racing	Mercedes-AMG GT4	Mercedes-AMG M178 4.0 L V8	408	(Germany) Roald Goethe	2	
(United Kingdom) ROFGO with Dragon Racing	Mercedes-AMG GT4	Mercedes-AMG M178 4.0 L V8	408	(South Africa) Jordan Grogor	2	
(United Kingdom) ROFGO with Dragon Racing	Mercedes-AMG GT4	Mercedes-AMG M178 4.0 L V8	408	(United Kingdom) Stuart Hall	2	
(United Arab Emirates) Dragon Racing	Mercedes-AMG GT4	Mercedes-AMG M178 4.0 L V8	488	(United Kingdom) Bradley Ellis	2	
(United Arab Emirates) Dragon Racing	Mercedes-AMG GT4	Mercedes-AMG M178 4.0 L V8	488	(United Kingdom) David Holloway	2	
(United Arab Emirates) Dragon Racing	Mercedes-AMG GT4	Mercedes-AMG M178 4.0 L V8	488	(Cyprus) Leo Loucas	2	
(United Arab Emirates) Dragon Racing	Mercedes-AMG GT4	Mercedes-AMG M178 4.0 L V8	488	(Cyprus) Rhea Loucas	2	
(United Arab Emirates) Buggyra ZM Racing	Mercedes-AMG GT4	Mercedes-AMG M178 4.0 L V8	416	(United Arab Emirates) Aliyyah Koloc	3	
(United Arab Emirates) Buggyra ZM Racing	Mercedes-AMG GT4	Mercedes-AMG M178 4.0 L V8	416	(Czech Republic) Adam Lacko	3	
(United Arab Emirates) Buggyra ZM Racing	Mercedes-AMG GT4	Mercedes-AMG M178 4.0 L V8	416	(Czech Republic) David Vršecký	3	
(United Kingdom) Century Motorsport	Aston Martin Vantage AMR GT4	Aston Martin 4.0 L Turbo V8	429	(United Kingdom) Bradley Ellis	1	
(United Kingdom) Century Motorsport	Aston Martin Vantage AMR GT4	Aston Martin 4.0 L Turbo V8	429	(United Kingdom) Adam Hatfield	1	
(United Kingdom) Century Motorsport	Aston Martin Vantage AMR GT4	Aston Martin 4.0 L Turbo V8	429	(United Kingdom) David Holloway	1	
(United Kingdom) Century Motorsport	Aston Martin Vantage AMR GT4	Aston Martin 4.0 L Turbo V8	429	(United Kingdom) Piers Johnson	1	
(United Kingdom) Century Motorsport	BMW M4 GT4 Gen II	BMW N55 3.0 L Twin-Turbo I6	429	(United Kingdom) Carl Cavers	2	
(United Kingdom) Century Motorsport	BMW M4 GT4 Gen II	BMW N55 3.0 L Twin-Turbo I6	429	(New Zealand) Michael Johnston	2	
(United Kingdom) Century Motorsport	BMW M4 GT4 Gen II	BMW N55 3.0 L Twin-Turbo I6	429	(United Kingdom) Lewis Plato	2	
(United Kingdom) Century Motorsport	BMW M4 GT4 Gen II	BMW N55 3.0 L Twin-Turbo I6	429	(United Kingdom) Chris Salkeld	2	
(United States) RHC Jorgensen-Strom by Century	BMW M4 GT4	BMW N55 3.0 L Twin-Turbo I6	450	(United Kingdom) Nathan Freke	1–2	
(United States) RHC Jorgensen-Strom by Century	BMW M4 GT4	BMW N55 3.0 L Twin-Turbo I6	450	(United States) Daren Jorgensen	1–2	
(United States) RHC Jorgensen-Strom by Century	BMW M4 GT4	BMW N55 3.0 L Twin-Turbo I6	450	(United States) Brett Strom	1–2	
(United States) RHC Jorgensen-Strom by Century	BMW M4 GT4	BMW N55 3.0 L Twin-Turbo I6	450	(Netherlands) Jeroen Bleekemolen	2	
(United States) RHC Jorgensen-Strom by Century	BMW M4 GT4	BMW N55 3.0 L Twin-Turbo I6	450	(Netherlands) Danny van Dongen	2	
(United Kingdom) Simpson Motorsport	BMW M4 GT4 Gen II	BMW N55 3.0 L Twin-Turbo I6	438	(United Kingdom) James Kaye	2–3	
(United Kingdom) Simpson Motorsport	BMW M4 GT4 Gen II	BMW N55 3.0 L Twin-Turbo I6	438	(United Kingdom) Adam Hatfield	2	
(United Kingdom) Simpson Motorsport	BMW M4 GT4 Gen II	BMW N55 3.0 L Twin-Turbo I6	438	(United Kingdom) David Holloway	2	
(United Kingdom) Simpson Motorsport	BMW M4 GT4 Gen II	BMW N55 3.0 L Twin-Turbo I6	438	(Papua New Guinea) Keith Kassulke	2	
(Germany) Lionspeed Racing by Herberth Motorsport	Porsche 718 Cayman GT4 Clubsport	Porsche 3.8 L Flat-6	491	(Norway) Andreas Bakkerud	1	
(Germany) Lionspeed Racing by Herberth Motorsport	Porsche 718 Cayman GT4 Clubsport	Porsche 3.8 L Flat-6	491	(United States) José Garcia	1	
(Germany) Lionspeed Racing by Herberth Motorsport	Porsche 718 Cayman GT4 Clubsport	Porsche 3.8 L Flat-6	491	(Germany) Patrick Kolb	1	
(Germany) Lionspeed Racing by Herberth Motorsport	Porsche 718 Cayman GT4 Clubsport	Porsche 3.8 L Flat-6	491	(United States) Daniel Miller	1	

GT3 entries
Icon	Class
P	GT3-Pro
PA	GT3-Pro Am
Am	GT3-Am
992 entries
Icon	Class
P	992-Pro
Am	992-Am

=== TCE ===
Team	Car	Engine	No.	Drivers	Rounds
TCR
(France) 700 Miles	Volkswagen Golf GTI TCR	Volkswagen EA888 2.0 L I4	106	(France) Thierry Chkondali	2
(France) 700 Miles	Volkswagen Golf GTI TCR	Volkswagen EA888 2.0 L I4	106	(Belgium) Fabian Duffieux	2
(France) 700 Miles	Volkswagen Golf GTI TCR	Volkswagen EA888 2.0 L I4	106	(France) Marc Girard	2
(France) 700 Miles	Volkswagen Golf GTI TCR	Volkswagen EA888 2.0 L I4	106	(France) Jordan Mougenot	2
(France) 700 Miles	Volkswagen Golf GTI TCR	Volkswagen EA888 2.0 L I4	106	(Canada) Michel Sallenbach	2
(Switzerland) Autorama Motorsport by Wolf-Power Racing	Audi RS 3 LMS TCR (2021)	Volkswagen EA888 2.0 L I4	116	(Kuwait) Mohamed Al Sabah	1
(Switzerland) Autorama Motorsport by Wolf-Power Racing	Audi RS 3 LMS TCR (2021)	Volkswagen EA888 2.0 L I4	116	(Switzerland) Jasmin Preisig	1
(Switzerland) Autorama Motorsport by Wolf-Power Racing	Audi RS 3 LMS TCR (2021)	Volkswagen EA888 2.0 L I4	116	(Latvia) Ivars Vallers	1
(Switzerland) Autorama Motorsport by Wolf-Power Racing	Audi RS 3 LMS TCR (2021)	Volkswagen EA888 2.0 L I4	117	(United Kingdom) Robert Huff	2
(Switzerland) Autorama Motorsport by Wolf-Power Racing	Audi RS 3 LMS TCR (2021)	Volkswagen EA888 2.0 L I4	117	(Germany) Marcus Menden	2
(Switzerland) Autorama Motorsport by Wolf-Power Racing	Audi RS 3 LMS TCR (2021)	Volkswagen EA888 2.0 L I4	117	(Germany) Marlon Menden	2
(Switzerland) Autorama Motorsport by Wolf-Power Racing	Audi RS 3 LMS TCR (2021)	Volkswagen EA888 2.0 L I4	117	(Germany) Peter Posavac	2
(Switzerland) Autorama Motorsport by Wolf-Power Racing	Audi RS 3 LMS TCR (2021)	Volkswagen EA888 2.0 L I4	121	(Switzerland) Jasmin Preisig	2–3
(Switzerland) Autorama Motorsport by Wolf-Power Racing	Audi RS 3 LMS TCR (2021)	Volkswagen EA888 2.0 L I4	121	(Latvia) Ivars Vallers	2–3
(Switzerland) Autorama Motorsport by Wolf-Power Racing	Audi RS 3 LMS TCR (2021)	Volkswagen EA888 2.0 L I4	121	(Sweden) Calle Bergman	2
(Switzerland) Autorama Motorsport by Wolf-Power Racing	Audi RS 3 LMS TCR (2021)	Volkswagen EA888 2.0 L I4	121	(Austria) Andreas Höfler	2
(Switzerland) Autorama Motorsport by Wolf-Power Racing	Audi RS 3 LMS TCR (2021)	Volkswagen EA888 2.0 L I4	121	(Belgium) Nicolas Baert	3
(Switzerland) Autorama Motorsport by Wolf-Power Racing	Audi RS 3 LMS TCR (2021)	Volkswagen EA888 2.0 L I4	121	(United Kingdom) Ricky Coomber	3
(Thailand) BBR – Billionaire Boys Racing	CUPRA León Competición TCR	Volkswagen EA888 2.0 L I4	159	(Thailand) Anusorn Asiralertsiri	1
(Thailand) BBR – Billionaire Boys Racing	CUPRA León Competición TCR	Volkswagen EA888 2.0 L I4	159	(Thailand) Kantadhee Kusiri	1
(Thailand) BBR – Billionaire Boys Racing	CUPRA León Competición TCR	Volkswagen EA888 2.0 L I4	159	(Thailand) Kantasak Kusiri	1
(Thailand) BBR – Billionaire Boys Racing	CUPRA León Competición TCR	Volkswagen EA888 2.0 L I4	159	(Thailand) Pasarit Promsombat	1
(Thailand) BBR – Billionaire Boys Racing	CUPRA León Competición TCR	Volkswagen EA888 2.0 L I4	159	(Thailand) Munkong Sathienthirakul	1
(Germany) Sharky-Racing	Audi RS 3 LMS TCR (2017)	Volkswagen EA888 2.0 L I4	176	(Armenia) Artur Goroyan	3
(Germany) Sharky-Racing	Audi RS 3 LMS TCR (2017)	Volkswagen EA888 2.0 L I4	176	(Fédération Internationale de l'Automobile) Roman Mavlanov	3
(Belgium) AC Motorsport	Audi RS 3 LMS TCR (2021)	Volkswagen EA888 2.0 L I4	188	(France) Stéphane Perrin	1–2
(Belgium) AC Motorsport	Audi RS 3 LMS TCR (2021)	Volkswagen EA888 2.0 L I4	188	(Belgium) Mathieu Detry	1
(Belgium) AC Motorsport	Audi RS 3 LMS TCR (2021)	Volkswagen EA888 2.0 L I4	188	(United Kingdom) James Kaye	1
(Belgium) AC Motorsport	Audi RS 3 LMS TCR (2021)	Volkswagen EA888 2.0 L I4	188	(Switzerland) Miklas Born	2
(Belgium) AC Motorsport	Audi RS 3 LMS TCR (2021)	Volkswagen EA888 2.0 L I4	188	(Belgium) Sam Dejonghe	2
(Belgium) AC Motorsport	Audi RS 3 LMS TCR (2021)	Volkswagen EA888 2.0 L I4	188	(Switzerland) Yannick Mettler	2
(Belgium) AC Motorsport	Audi RS 3 LMS TCR (2021)	Volkswagen EA888 2.0 L I4	188	(Argentina) Marcos Costantini	3
(Belgium) AC Motorsport	Audi RS 3 LMS TCR (2021)	Volkswagen EA888 2.0 L I4	188	(Lithuania) Jonas Karklys	3
(Belgium) AC Motorsport	Audi RS 3 LMS TCR (2021)	Volkswagen EA888 2.0 L I4	188	(Denmark) Niels Ulrich Nyboe	3
(Belgium) AC Motorsport	Audi RS 3 LMS TCR (2017)	Volkswagen EA888 2.0 L I4	199	(China) Tommy Ku	2
(Belgium) AC Motorsport	Audi RS 3 LMS TCR (2017)	Volkswagen EA888 2.0 L I4	199	(Hong Kong) David Lau	2
(Belgium) AC Motorsport	Audi RS 3 LMS TCR (2017)	Volkswagen EA888 2.0 L I4	199	(Hong Kong) Shaun Thong	2
(Belgium) AC Motorsport	Audi RS 3 LMS TCR (2017)	Volkswagen EA888 2.0 L I4	199	(Hong Kong) Andy Yan	2
(Belgium) AC Motorsport	Audi RS 3 LMS TCR (2017)	Volkswagen EA888 2.0 L I4	199	(Switzerland) Mato Matosevic	3
(Belgium) AC Motorsport	Audi RS 3 LMS TCR (2017)	Volkswagen EA888 2.0 L I4	199	(France) Victor Moutinho	3
(Belgium) AC Motorsport	Audi RS 3 LMS TCR (2017)	Volkswagen EA888 2.0 L I4	199	(Netherlands) Paul Sieljes	3
TCX
(Germany) Team Avia Sorg Rennsport	Porsche 718 Cayman GT4 Clubsport	Porsche 4.0 L Flat-6	227	(Germany) Daniel Gregor	2
(Germany) Team Avia Sorg Rennsport	Porsche 718 Cayman GT4 Clubsport	Porsche 4.0 L Flat-6	227	(Switzerland) Patrick Grütter	2
(Germany) Team Avia Sorg Rennsport	Porsche 718 Cayman GT4 Clubsport	Porsche 4.0 L Flat-6	227	(Germany) Christoph Krombach	2
(Germany) Team Avia Sorg Rennsport	Porsche 718 Cayman GT4 Clubsport	Porsche 4.0 L Flat-6	227	(Mexico) Benito Tagle	2
TC
(Switzerland) Hofor Racing by Bonk Motorsport	BMW M2 ClubSport Racing	BMW S55B30T0 3.0 L I6	331	(Germany) Hermann Bock	1
(Switzerland) Hofor Racing by Bonk Motorsport	BMW M2 ClubSport Racing	BMW S55B30T0 3.0 L I6	331	(Germany) Michael Bonk	1
(Switzerland) Hofor Racing by Bonk Motorsport	BMW M2 ClubSport Racing	BMW S55B30T0 3.0 L I6	331	(Switzerland) Martin Kroll	1
(Switzerland) Hofor Racing by Bonk Motorsport	BMW M2 ClubSport Racing	BMW S55B30T0 3.0 L I6	331	(Germany) Michael Mayer	1
(Switzerland) Hofor Racing by Bonk Motorsport	BMW M2 ClubSport Racing	BMW S55B30T0 3.0 L I6	331	(Germany) Rainer Partl	1
(Switzerland) Hofor Racing by Bonk Motorsport	BMW M2 ClubSport Racing	BMW S55B30T0 3.0 L I6	332	(Germany) Hermann Bock	1
(Switzerland) Hofor Racing by Bonk Motorsport	BMW M2 ClubSport Racing	BMW S55B30T0 3.0 L I6	332	(Germany) Michael Bonk	1
(Switzerland) Hofor Racing by Bonk Motorsport	BMW M2 ClubSport Racing	BMW S55B30T0 3.0 L I6	332	(Switzerland) Martin Kroll	1
(Switzerland) Hofor Racing by Bonk Motorsport	BMW M2 ClubSport Racing	BMW S55B30T0 3.0 L I6	332	(Germany) Michael Mayer	1
(Switzerland) Hofor Racing by Bonk Motorsport	BMW M2 ClubSport Racing	BMW S55B30T0 3.0 L I6	332	(Germany) Rainer Partl	1

== Race results ==
Bold indicates overall winner.

Event	Circuit	GT3-Pro Winners	GT3-Pro Am Winners	GT3-Am Winners	GTX Winners	992-Pro Winners	992-Am Winners	GT4 Winners	TCR Winners	TCX Winners	TC Winners	Report
1	Kuwait Motor Town	No. 47 Team Kuwait by MRS GT-Racing	No Entrants	**(United States) No. 85 CP Racing**	(Germany) No. 710 Leipert Motorsport	(Netherlands) No. 909 Red Camel-Jordans.nl	(Germany) No. 928 HRT Performance	(United Kingdom) No. 429 Century Motorsport	**(Thailand) No. 159 BBR – Billionaire Boys Racing**	No Entrants	(Germany) No. 332 Hofor Racing by Bonk Motorsport	Report
1	Kuwait Motor Town	(Kuwait) Ahmad Al Ghanem (Kuwait) Mohammed Al Kazemi (Kuwait) Zaid Ashkanani	No Entrants	**(United States) Charles Espenlaub** **(United States) Joe Foster** **(United States) Shane Lewis** **(United States) Charles Putman**	(United States) Jean-Francois Brunot (United States) Gregg Gorski (China) Kerong Li	(Netherlands) Ivo Breukers (Netherlands) Luc Breukers (Netherlands) Rik Breukers	(Netherlands) Gijs Bessem (Germany) Kim Andre Hauschild (Netherlands) Harry Hilders	(United Kingdom) Bradley Ellis (United Kingdom) Adam Hatfield (United Kingdom) David Holloway (United Kingdom) Piers Johnson	**(Thailand) Anusorn Asiralertsiri** **(Thailand) Kantadhee Kusiri** **(Thailand) Kantasak Kusiri** **(Thailand) Pasarit Promsombat** **(Thailand) Tanart Sathienthirakul**	No Entrants	(Germany) Hermann Bock (Germany) Michael Bonk (Switzerland) Martin Kroll (Germany) Michael Mayer (Germany) Rainer Partl	Report
2	(United Arab Emirates) Dubai Autodrome	**(Saudi Arabia) No. 7 MS7 by WRT**	(Germany) No. 91 Lionspeed by Herberth Motorsport	(United States) No. 85 CP Racing	(Austria) No. 714 Razoon – More than Racing	(Switzerland) No. 962 Fach Auto Tech	(Germany) No. 925 Huber Racing	(United Kingdom) No. 408 ROFGO with Dragon Racing	**(Belgium) No. 188 AC Motorsport**	(Germany) No. 227 Team Avia Sorg Rennsport	No Entrants	Report
2	(United Arab Emirates) Dubai Autodrome	**(Saudi Arabia) Mohammed Bin Saud Al Saud** **(Germany) Jens Klingmann** **(Mexico) Diego Menchaca** **(France) Jean-Baptiste Simmenauer** **(Belgium) Dries Vanthoor**	(Switzerland) Daniel Allemann (Germany) Ralf Bohn (Germany) Alfred Renauer (Germany) Robert Renauer	(United States) Charles Espenlaub (United States) Joe Foster (United States) Shane Lewis (United States) Charles Putman (United Kingdom) Phil Quaife	(Austria) Bob Bau (Austria) Daniel Drexel (Austria) Ernst Kirchmayr (Austria) Leo Pichler (Austria) Kris Rosenberger	(Netherlands) Huub van Eijndhoven (Germany) Matthias Hoffsümmer (Italy) Gabriele Rindone (Germany) Alexander Schwarzer (Netherlands) Larry ten Voorde	(Germany) Stefan Aust (Germany) Steffen Görig (Germany) Klaus Rader (Germany) Hans Wehrmann	(Denmark) Benjamin Goethe (Germany) Oliver Goethe (Germany) Roald Goethe (South Africa) Jordan Grogor (United Kingdom) Stuart Hall	(Switzerland) Miklas Born (Belgium) Sam Dejonghe (Switzerland) Yannick Mettler (France) Stéphane Perrin	(Germany) Daniel Gregor (Switzerland) Patrick Grütter (Germany) Christoph Krombach (Mexico) Benito Tagle	No Entrants	Report
3	(United Arab Emirates) Yas Marina Circuit	**(Germany) No. 911 Pure Rxcing**	(Germany) No. 1 Phoenix Racing	(Slovakia) No. 44 ARC Bratislava	(Austria) No. 714 Razoon – More than Racing	(Netherlands) No. 909 Red Camel-Jordans.nl	(Germany) No. 928 HRT Performance	(United Arab Emirates) No. 416 Buggyra ZM Racing	(Germany) No. 106 Sharky-Racing	No Entrants	No Entrants	Report
3	(United Arab Emirates) Yas Marina Circuit	**(United Kingdom) Harry King** **(Fédération Internationale de l'Automobile) Alex Malykhin** **(Germany) Joel Sturm**	(Austria) Michael Doppelmayr (Germany) Elia Erhart (Germany) Pierre Kaffer	(Poland) Andrzej Lewandowski (Slovakia) Miro Konôpka	(Austria) Daniel Drexel (Austria) Dominik Olbert (Kuwait) Haytham Qarajouli	(Netherlands) Ivo Breukers (Netherlands) Luc Breukers (Netherlands) Rik Breukers	(Finland) Miika Panu (Finland) Jim Rautiainen	(United Arab Emirates) Aliyyah Koloc (Czech Republic) Adam Lacko (Czech Republic) David Vršecký	(Armenia) Artur Goroyan (Fédération Internationale de l'Automobile) Roman Mavlanov	No Entrants	No Entrants	Report

== Championship standings ==
=== Points system ===
Teams and drivers must race in at least 2 (two) events to be eligible for championship.

Position	**1st**	**2nd**	**3rd**	**4th**	**5th**	**6th**	**7th**	**8th**	**9th**	**10th**	**11th**	**12th**	**13th**	**14th**	**15th**
Points	40	36	32	28	24	20	18	16	14	12	10	8	6	4	2

=== GT3 Drivers' ===
Pos.	Drivers	Team	(Kuwait) KUW	(United Arab Emirates) DUB	(United Arab Emirates) ABU	Pts.
1	(Germany) Alfred Renauer (Germany) Robert Renauer	(Germany) Lionspeed by Herberth Motorsport		2	2	72
2	(Belgium) Mathieu Detry (Belgium) Maxime Soulet	(Antigua and Barbuda) HAAS RT		5	3	56
3	(United States) Charles Espenlaub (United States) Joe Foster (United States) Shane Lewis (United States) Charles Putman	(United States) CP Racing	1	9		54
4	(Slovakia) Miro Konôpka	(Slovakia) ARC Bratislava	4		5	52
5	(Netherlands) Lucas Groeneveld (Netherlands) Daan van Kuijk (Netherlands) Jesse van Kuijk	(Netherlands) Team GP-Elite	3	7		50
6	(United Kingdom) Harry King (Fédération Internationale de l'Automobile) Alex Malykhin (Germany) Joel Sturm	(Lithuania) Pure Rxcing		12	1	48
7	(Austria) Michael Doppelmayr (Germany) Elia Erhart (Germany) Pierre Kaffer	(Germany) Phoenix Racing		10	4	40

Colour	Result
Gold	Winner
Silver	Second place
Bronze	Third place
Green	Points classification
Blue	Non-points classification
Blue	Non-classified finish (NC)
Purple	Retired, not classified (Ret)
Red	Did not qualify (DNQ)
Red	Did not pre-qualify (DNPQ)
Black	Disqualified (DSQ)
White	Did not start (DNS)
White	Withdrew (WD)
White	Race cancelled (C)
Blank	Did not practice (DNP)
Blank	Did not arrive (DNA)
Blank	Excluded (EX)

**Bold** – Pole
Italics – Fastest Lap

=== GT3 Teams' ===
Pos.	Team	(Kuwait) KUW	(United Arab Emirates) DUB	(United Arab Emirates) ABU	Pts.
1	(Germany) No. 91 Lionspeed by Herberth Motorsport		2	2	72
2	(Antigua and Barbuda) No. 21 HAAS RT		5	3	56
3	(United States) No. 85 CP Racing	1	9		54
4	(Slovakia) No. 44 ARC Bratislava	4		5	52
5	(Lithuania) No. 911 Pure Rxcing		12	1	48
6	(Germany) No. 1 Phoenix Racing		10	4	40
Ineligible for championship
-	(Netherlands) No. 32 Team GP-Elite	3†	7		(50)
-	(Saudi Arabia) No. 7 MS7 by Team WRT		1		(40)
-	No. 47 Team Kuwait by MRS GT-Racing	2			(36)
-	(Italy) No. 46 KFC VR46 Team WRT		3		(32)
-	(Australia) No. 10 EBM – Grove Racing		4		(28)
-	(Germany) No. 92 Herberth Motorsport		6		(20)
-	(Netherlands) No. 12 JR Motorsport			6	(20)
-	(United States) No. 27 Heart of Racing Team by SPS		8		(16)
-	(France) No. 2 Visiom		11		(10)
-	(United Arab Emirates) No. 48 S’Aalocin by Kox Racing		13		(6)
-	(Denmark) No. 14 Poulsen Motorsport		14†		(4)
-	(Netherlands) No. 19 MP Motorsport		15†		(2)
-	(United Kingdom) No. 76 7TSIX		16†		0
-	(France) No. 26 Saintéloc Racing		Ret		0
-	(United Kingdom) No. 43 OnlyFans Racing With P1 Groupe By MRS		Ret		0
-	(Oman) No. 777 Al Manar Racing by HRT		Ret		0
-	(United Arab Emirates) No. 4 Abu Dhabi Racing by HRT Bilstein		Ret		0
-	(Italy) No. 99 Tresor by Attempto Racing		Ret		0

Colour	Result
Gold	Winner
Silver	Second place
Bronze	Third place
Green	Points classification
Blue	Non-points classification
Blue	Non-classified finish (NC)
Purple	Retired, not classified (Ret)
Red	Did not qualify (DNQ)
Red	Did not pre-qualify (DNPQ)
Black	Disqualified (DSQ)
White	Did not start (DNS)
White	Withdrew (WD)
White	Race cancelled (C)
Blank	Did not practice (DNP)
Blank	Did not arrive (DNA)
Blank	Excluded (EX)

**Bold** – Pole
Italics – Fastest Lap

† – Drivers did not finish the race, but were classified as they completed over 50% of the class winner's race distance.

=== GT3-Pro Am Teams' ===
Pos.	Team	(Kuwait) KUW	(United Arab Emirates) DUB	(United Arab Emirates) ABU	Pts.
1	(Germany) No. 1 Phoenix Racing		10	4	68
Ineligible for championship
-	(Germany) No. 91 Lionspeed by Herberth Motorsport		2		(40)
-	(Germany) No. 92 Herberth Motorsport		6		(36)
-	(United States) No. 27 Heart of Racing Team by SPS		8		(32)
-	(France) No. 2 Visiom		11		(24)
-	(Denmark) No. 14 Poulsen Motorsport		14†		(20)
-	(Netherlands) No. 19 MP Motorsport		15†		(18)
-	(United Kingdom) No. 43 OnlyFans Racing With P1 Groupe By MRS		Ret		0

Colour	Result
Gold	Winner
Silver	Second place
Bronze	Third place
Green	Points classification
Blue	Non-points classification
Blue	Non-classified finish (NC)
Purple	Retired, not classified (Ret)
Red	Did not qualify (DNQ)
Red	Did not pre-qualify (DNPQ)
Black	Disqualified (DSQ)
White	Did not start (DNS)
White	Withdrew (WD)
White	Race cancelled (C)
Blank	Did not practice (DNP)
Blank	Did not arrive (DNA)
Blank	Excluded (EX)

**Bold** – Pole
Italics – Fastest Lap

=== GT3-Am Teams' ===
Pos.	Team	(Kuwait) KUW	(United Arab Emirates) DUB	(United Arab Emirates) ABU	Pts.
1	(United States) No. 85 CP Racing	1	9		80
2	(Slovakia) No. 44 ARC Bratislava	4		5	76
Ineligible for championship
-	(United Arab Emirates) No. 48 S’Aalocin by Kox Racing		13		(36)
-	(United Kingdom) No. 76 7TSIX		16†		(32)

Colour	Result
Gold	Winner
Silver	Second place
Bronze	Third place
Green	Points classification
Blue	Non-points classification
Blue	Non-classified finish (NC)
Purple	Retired, not classified (Ret)
Red	Did not qualify (DNQ)
Red	Did not pre-qualify (DNPQ)
Black	Disqualified (DSQ)
White	Did not start (DNS)
White	Withdrew (WD)
White	Race cancelled (C)
Blank	Did not practice (DNP)
Blank	Did not arrive (DNA)
Blank	Excluded (EX)

**Bold** – Pole
Italics – Fastest Lap

=== 992 Teams' ===
Pos.	Team	(Kuwait) KUW	(United Arab Emirates) DUB	(United Arab Emirates) ABU	Pts.
1	(Romania) No. 955 Willi Motorsport by Ebimotors	2	5	4	88
2	(Germany) No. 928 HRT Performance / NKPP by HRT Performance	3	7	2	86
3	(Netherlands) No. 909 Red Camel-Jordans.nl	1	NC	1	80
4	No. 929 QMMF by HRT Thuraya Qatar	5	6	6	64
5	/ (Germany) No. 930 QMMF by HRT Suhail Qatar / HRT Performance	6	15†	5	46
6	(Germany) No. 931 HRT Performance		10	3	44
7	(Belgium) No. 979 Speed Lover by RABDAN / Speed Lover	4	13	Ret	34
Ineligible for championship
-	(Switzerland) No. 962 Fach Auto Tech		1		(40)
-	(Switzerland) No. 961 Fach Auto Tech		2		(36)
-	(United Kingdom) No. 995 Duel Racing with Toro Verde GT		3		(32)
-	(Germany) No. 925 Huber Racing		4		(28)
-	(Luxembourg) No. 908 SebLajoux Racing by DUWO Racing		8		(16)
-	(Germany) No. 989 MRS GT-Racing		9		(14)
-	(Luxembourg) No. 907 SebLajoux Racing by DUWO Racing		11		(10)
-	(Germany) No. 990 MRS GT-Racing		12		(8)
-	(United Arab Emirates) No. 977 RABDAN Motorsports		14†		(4)
-	(Estonia) No. 988 ALM Motorsport by MRS GT-Racing		Ret		0
-	(Germany) No. 932 HRT Performance		Ret		0

Colour	Result
Gold	Winner
Silver	Second place
Bronze	Third place
Green	Points classification
Blue	Non-points classification
Blue	Non-classified finish (NC)
Purple	Retired, not classified (Ret)
Red	Did not qualify (DNQ)
Red	Did not pre-qualify (DNPQ)
Black	Disqualified (DSQ)
White	Did not start (DNS)
White	Withdrew (WD)
White	Race cancelled (C)
Blank	Did not practice (DNP)
Blank	Did not arrive (DNA)
Blank	Excluded (EX)

**Bold** – Pole
Italics – Fastest Lap

=== 992-Am Teams' ===
Pos.	Team	(Kuwait) KUW	(United Arab Emirates) DUB	(United Arab Emirates) ABU	Pts.
1	(Germany) No. 928 HRT Performance / NKPP by HRT Performance	3	7	2	112
2	No. 929 QMMF by HRT Thuraya Qatar	5	6	6	104
3	(Belgium) No. 979 Speed Lover by RABDAN / Speed Lover	4	13	Ret	50
4	No. 930 QMMF by HRT Suhail Qatar	6	15†		40
Ineligible for championship
-	(Germany) No. 925 Huber Racing		4		(40)
-	(Luxembourg) No. 908 SebLajoux Racing by DUWO Racing		8		(28)
-	(Germany) No. 989 MRS GT-Racing		9		(24)
-	(Germany) No. 931 HRT Performance		10		(20)
-	(Luxembourg) No. 907 SebLajoux Racing by DUWO Racing		11		(18)
-	(Germany) No. 990 MRS GT-Racing		12		(16)
-	(Estonia) No. 988 ALM Motorsport by MRS GT-Racing		Ret		0
-	(Germany) No. 932 HRT Performance		Ret		0

Colour	Result
Gold	Winner
Silver	Second place
Bronze	Third place
Green	Points classification
Blue	Non-points classification
Blue	Non-classified finish (NC)
Purple	Retired, not classified (Ret)
Red	Did not qualify (DNQ)
Red	Did not pre-qualify (DNPQ)
Black	Disqualified (DSQ)
White	Did not start (DNS)
White	Withdrew (WD)
White	Race cancelled (C)
Blank	Did not practice (DNP)
Blank	Did not arrive (DNA)
Blank	Excluded (EX)

**Bold** – Pole
Italics – Fastest Lap

=== GTX Teams' ===
Pos.	Team	(Kuwait) KUW	(United Arab Emirates) DUB	(United Arab Emirates) ABU	Pts.
1	(Austria) No. 714 Razoon – More than Racing	3	1	1	112
2	(France) No. 701 Vortex V8	2	2	4	100
Ineligible for championship
-	(Germany) No. 710 Leipert Motorsport	1		DNS	(40)
-	(Germany) No. 763 Tischner Motorsport			2	(36)
-	(France) No. 702 Vortex V8		3		(32)
-	(Portugal) No. 721 P21 Motorsport			3	(32)

Colour	Result
Gold	Winner
Silver	Second place
Bronze	Third place
Green	Points classification
Blue	Non-points classification
Blue	Non-classified finish (NC)
Purple	Retired, not classified (Ret)
Red	Did not qualify (DNQ)
Red	Did not pre-qualify (DNPQ)
Black	Disqualified (DSQ)
White	Did not start (DNS)
White	Withdrew (WD)
White	Race cancelled (C)
Blank	Did not practice (DNP)
Blank	Did not arrive (DNA)
Blank	Excluded (EX)

**Bold** – Pole
Italics – Fastest Lap

=== GT4 Teams' ===
Pos.	Team	(Kuwait) KUW	(United Arab Emirates) DUB	(United Arab Emirates) ABU	Pts.
1	(United Kingdom) No. 429 Century Motorsport	1	3		72
2	(United States) No. 450 RHC Jorgensen-Strom by Century	2	Ret		36
3	(United Kingdom) No. 438 Simpson Motorsport		2	Ret	36
Ineligible for championship
-	(United Kingdom) No. 408 ROFGO with Dragon Racing		1		(40)
-	(United Arab Emirates) No. 416 Buggyra ZM Racing			1	(40)
-	(United Kingdom) No. 405 RAM Racing			2	(36)
-	(Germany) No. 491 Lionspeed Racing by Herberth Motorsport	3			(32)
-	(United Arab Emirates) No. 488 Dragon Racing		DNS		-

Colour	Result
Gold	Winner
Silver	Second place
Bronze	Third place
Green	Points classification
Blue	Non-points classification
Blue	Non-classified finish (NC)
Purple	Retired, not classified (Ret)
Red	Did not qualify (DNQ)
Red	Did not pre-qualify (DNPQ)
Black	Disqualified (DSQ)
White	Did not start (DNS)
White	Withdrew (WD)
White	Race cancelled (C)
Blank	Did not practice (DNP)
Blank	Did not arrive (DNA)
Blank	Excluded (EX)

**Bold** – Pole
Italics – Fastest Lap

=== TCR Drivers' ===
Pos.	Driver	Team	(Kuwait) KUW	(United Arab Emirates) DUB	(United Arab Emirates) ABU	Pts.
1	(Switzerland) Jasmin Preisig (Latvia) Ivars Vallers	(Switzerland) Autorama Motorsport by Wolf-Power Racing	2	3	2	104
2	(France) Stéphane Perrin	(Belgium) AC Motorsport	Ret	1		40
Ineligible for championship
-	(Thailand) Anusorn Asiralertsiri (Thailand) Kantadhee Kusiri (Thailand) Kantasak Kusiri (Thailand) Pasarit Promsombat (Thailand) Munkong Sathienthirakul	(Thailand) BBR – Billionaire Boys Racing	1			(40)
-	(Switzerland) Miklas Born (Belgium) Sam Dejonghe (Switzerland) Yannick Mettler	(Belgium) AC Motorsport		1		(40)
-	(Armenia) Artur Goroyan (Fédération Internationale de l'Automobile) Roman Mavlanov	(Germany) Sharky-Racing			1	(40)
-	(Kuwait) Mohamed Al Sabah	(Switzerland) Autorama Motorsport by Wolf-Power Racing	2			(36)
-	(United Kingdom) Robert Huff (Germany) Marcus Menden (Germany) Marlon Menden (Germany) Peter Posavac	(Switzerland) Autorama Motorsport by Wolf-Power Racing		2		(36)
-	(Belgium) Nicolas Baert (United Kingdom) Ricky Coomber	(Switzerland) Autorama Motorsport by Wolf-Power Racing			2	(36)
-	(Sweden) Calle Bergman (Austria) Andreas Höfler	(Switzerland) Autorama Motorsport by Wolf-Power Racing		3		(32)
-	(Argentina) Marcos Costantini (Lithuania) Jonas Karklys (Denmark) Niels Ulrich Nyboe	(Belgium) AC Motorsport			3	(32)
-	(France) Thierry Chkondali (Belgium) Fabian Duffieux (France) Marc Girard (France) Jordan Mougenot (Canada) Michel Sallenbach	(France) 700 Miles		4		(28)
-	(Switzerland) Mato Matosevic (France) Victor Moutinho (Netherlands) Paul Sieljes	(Belgium) AC Motorsport			4	(28)
-	(China) Tommy Ku (Hong Kong) David Lau (Hong Kong) Shaun Thong (Hong Kong) Andy Yan	(Belgium) AC Motorsport		5		(24)
-	(Belgium) Mathieu Detry (United Kingdom) James Kaye	(Belgium) AC Motorsport	Ret			-

Colour	Result
Gold	Winner
Silver	Second place
Bronze	Third place
Green	Points classification
Blue	Non-points classification
Blue	Non-classified finish (NC)
Purple	Retired, not classified (Ret)
Red	Did not qualify (DNQ)
Red	Did not pre-qualify (DNPQ)
Black	Disqualified (DSQ)
White	Did not start (DNS)
White	Withdrew (WD)
White	Race cancelled (C)
Blank	Did not practice (DNP)
Blank	Did not arrive (DNA)
Blank	Excluded (EX)

**Bold** – Pole
Italics – Fastest Lap

=== TCR Teams' ===
Pos.	Team	(Kuwait) KUW	(United Arab Emirates) DUB	(United Arab Emirates) ABU	Pts.
1	(Switzerland) No. 116/121 Autorama Motorsport by Wolf-Power Racing	2	3	2	104
2	(Belgium) No. 188 AC Motorsport	Ret	1	3	72
3	(Belgium) No. 199 AC Motorsport		5	4	52
Ineligible for championship
-	(Thailand) No. 159 BBR – Billionaire Boys Racing	1			(40)
-	(Germany) No. 176 Sharky-Racing			1	(40)
-	(Switzerland) No. 117 Autorama Motorsport by Wolf-Power Racing		2		(36)
-	(France) No. 106 700 Miles		4		(28)

Colour	Result
Gold	Winner
Silver	Second place
Bronze	Third place
Green	Points classification
Blue	Non-points classification
Blue	Non-classified finish (NC)
Purple	Retired, not classified (Ret)
Red	Did not qualify (DNQ)
Red	Did not pre-qualify (DNPQ)
Black	Disqualified (DSQ)
White	Did not start (DNS)
White	Withdrew (WD)
White	Race cancelled (C)
Blank	Did not practice (DNP)
Blank	Did not arrive (DNA)
Blank	Excluded (EX)

**Bold** – Pole
Italics – Fastest Lap
