= 2022 12 Hours of Kuwait =

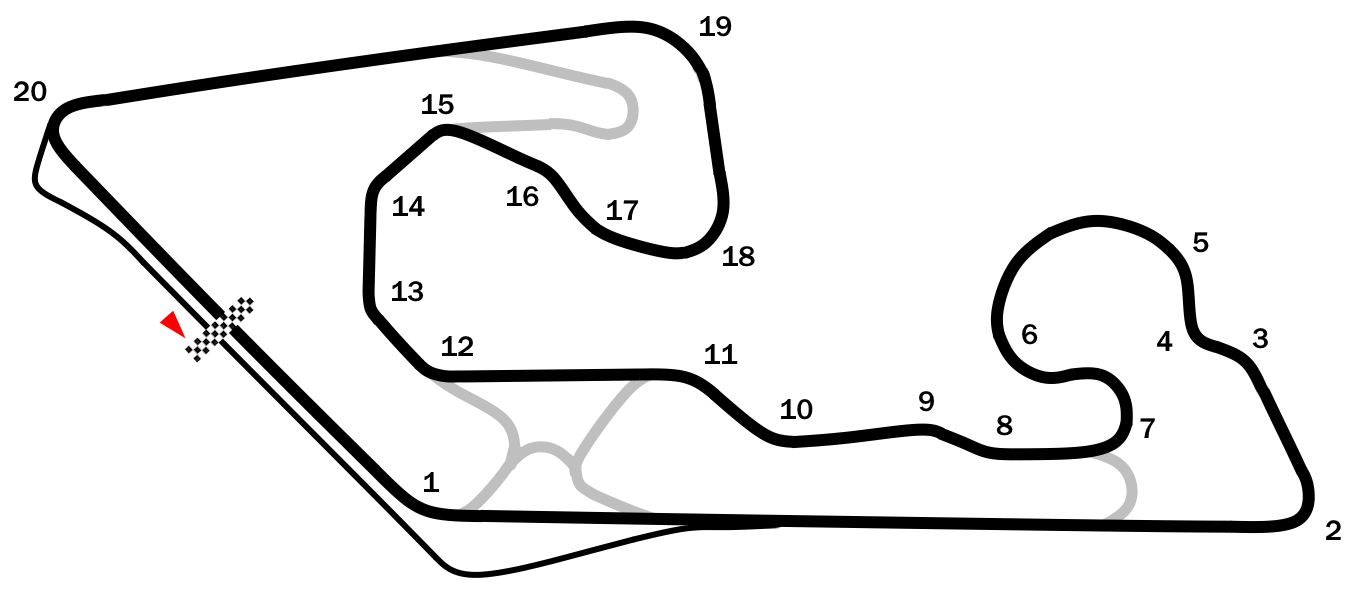
The layout of the Kuwait Motor Town, where the race was held.

The 2022 12 Hours of Kuwait (formally known as the Hankook 12 Hours of Kuwait) was an endurance sportscar racing event held on 2 December 2022, as the first of three rounds of the 2022–23 Middle East Trophy. This was the first running of the event.

== Schedule ==
Date	Time (local: AST)	Event	Duration
1 December	17:30 - 19:30	Free Practice	120 Minutes
1 December	20:00 - 20:55	Qualifying	3x15 Minutes
2 December	12:00 - 00:00	Race	12 Hours

== Entry list ==
Team	Car	Engine	No.	Drivers	Class
GT3 (4 entries)
(Netherlands) Team GP-Elite	Porsche 911 GT3 R	Porsche 4.0 L Flat-6	32	(Netherlands) Lucas Groeneveld	P
(Netherlands) Team GP-Elite	Porsche 911 GT3 R	Porsche 4.0 L Flat-6	32	(Netherlands) Daan van Kuijk	P
(Netherlands) Team GP-Elite	Porsche 911 GT3 R	Porsche 4.0 L Flat-6	32	(Netherlands) Jesse van Kuijk	P
(Slovakia) ARC Bratislava	Lamborghini Huracán GT3	Lamborghini 5.2 L V10	44	(Slovakia) Miro Konôpka	Am
(Slovakia) ARC Bratislava	Lamborghini Huracán GT3	Lamborghini 5.2 L V10	44	(Slovakia) Matej Konôpka	Am
(Slovakia) ARC Bratislava	Lamborghini Huracán GT3	Lamborghini 5.2 L V10	44	(Slovakia) Zdeno Mikulasko	Am
Team Kuwait by MRS GT-Racing	Porsche 911 GT3 R	Porsche 4.0 L Flat-6	47	(Kuwait) Ahmad Al Ghanem	P
Team Kuwait by MRS GT-Racing	Porsche 911 GT3 R	Porsche 4.0 L Flat-6	47	(Kuwait) Mohammed Al Kazemi	P
Team Kuwait by MRS GT-Racing	Porsche 911 GT3 R	Porsche 4.0 L Flat-6	47	(Kuwait) Zaid Ashkanani	P
(United States) CP Racing	Mercedes-AMG GT3 Evo	Mercedes-AMG M159 6.2 L V8	85	(United States) Charles Espenlaub	Am
(United States) CP Racing	Mercedes-AMG GT3 Evo	Mercedes-AMG M159 6.2 L V8	85	(United States) Joe Foster	Am
(United States) CP Racing	Mercedes-AMG GT3 Evo	Mercedes-AMG M159 6.2 L V8	85	(United States) Shane Lewis	Am
(United States) CP Racing	Mercedes-AMG GT3 Evo	Mercedes-AMG M159 6.2 L V8	85	(United States) Charles Putman	Am
GTX (3 entries)
(France) Vortex V8	Vortex 1.0 GTX	Chevrolet 6.2 L V8	701	(France) Lionel Amrouche	
(France) Vortex V8	Vortex 1.0 GTX	Chevrolet 6.2 L V8	701	(France) Philippe Bonnel	
(France) Vortex V8	Vortex 1.0 GTX	Chevrolet 6.2 L V8	701	(Switzerland) Nicolas Nobs	
(Germany) Leipert Motorsport	Lamborghini Huracán Super Trofeo Evo	Lamborghini 5.2 L V10	710	(United States) Gregg Gorski	
(Germany) Leipert Motorsport	Lamborghini Huracán Super Trofeo Evo	Lamborghini 5.2 L V10	710	(United States) Jean-Francois Brunot	
(Germany) Leipert Motorsport	Lamborghini Huracán Super Trofeo Evo	Lamborghini 5.2 L V10	710	(China) Kerong Li	
(Austria) razoon-more than racing	KTM X-Bow GT2 Concept	Audi 2.5 L I5	714	(Austria) Daniel Drexel	
(Austria) razoon-more than racing	KTM X-Bow GT2 Concept	Audi 2.5 L I5	714	(Austria) Dominik Olbert	
(Austria) razoon-more than racing	KTM X-Bow GT2 Concept	Audi 2.5 L I5	714	(Kuwait) Haytham Qarajouli	
(Austria) razoon-more than racing	KTM X-Bow GT2 Concept	Audi 2.5 L I5	714	(Austria) Laura Kraihamer	
992 (6 entries)
(Netherlands) Red Camel-Jordans.nl	Porsche 992 GT3 Cup	Porsche 4.0 L Flat-6	909	(Netherlands) Ivo Breukers	P
(Netherlands) Red Camel-Jordans.nl	Porsche 992 GT3 Cup	Porsche 4.0 L Flat-6	909	(Netherlands) Luc Breukers	P
(Netherlands) Red Camel-Jordans.nl	Porsche 992 GT3 Cup	Porsche 4.0 L Flat-6	909	(Netherlands) Rik Breukers	P
(Germany) HRT Performance	Porsche 992 GT3 Cup	Porsche 4.0 L Flat-6	928	(Netherlands) Gijs Bessem	Am
(Germany) HRT Performance	Porsche 992 GT3 Cup	Porsche 4.0 L Flat-6	928	(Netherlands) Harry Hilders	Am
QMMF by HRT Thuraya Qatar	Porsche 992 GT3 Cup	Porsche 4.0 L Flat-6	929	(Qatar) Abdulla Ali Al-Khelaifi	Am
QMMF by HRT Thuraya Qatar	Porsche 992 GT3 Cup	Porsche 4.0 L Flat-6	929	(Qatar) Ibrahim Al-Mannai	Am
QMMF by HRT Thuraya Qatar	Porsche 992 GT3 Cup	Porsche 4.0 L Flat-6	929	(Denmark) Anders Fjordbach	Am
QMMF by HRT Thuraya Qatar	Porsche 992 GT3 Cup	Porsche 4.0 L Flat-6	929	(Qatar) Hamad Saeed Al Asam	Am
QMMF by HRT Suhail Qatar	Porsche 992 GT3 Cup	Porsche 4.0 L Flat-6	930	(Qatar) Abdullah Al Abbasi	Am
QMMF by HRT Suhail Qatar	Porsche 992 GT3 Cup	Porsche 4.0 L Flat-6	930	(Qatar) Ghanim Ali Al Maadheed	Am
QMMF by HRT Suhail Qatar	Porsche 992 GT3 Cup	Porsche 4.0 L Flat-6	930	(Qatar) Ibrahim Al-Abdulghani	Am
QMMF by HRT Suhail Qatar	Porsche 992 GT3 Cup	Porsche 4.0 L Flat-6	930	(Germany) Kim Andre Hauschild	Am
(Romania) Willi Motorsport by Ebimotors	Porsche 992 GT3 Cup	Porsche 4.0 L Flat-6	955	(Italy) Fabrizio Broggi	P
(Romania) Willi Motorsport by Ebimotors	Porsche 992 GT3 Cup	Porsche 4.0 L Flat-6	955	(Italy) Sabino de Castro	P
(Romania) Willi Motorsport by Ebimotors	Porsche 992 GT3 Cup	Porsche 4.0 L Flat-6	955	(Romania) Sergiu Nicolae	P
(Belgium) Rabdan Motorsport by Speed Lover	Porsche 992 GT3 Cup	Porsche 4.0 L Flat-6	979	(Belgium) Olivier Dons	Am
(Belgium) Rabdan Motorsport by Speed Lover	Porsche 992 GT3 Cup	Porsche 4.0 L Flat-6	979	(United Arab Emirates) Saif Al Ameri	Am
(Belgium) Rabdan Motorsport by Speed Lover	Porsche 992 GT3 Cup	Porsche 4.0 L Flat-6	979	(Italy) Enrico Fernando Fulgenzi	Am
GT4 (3 entries)
(United Kingdom) Century Motorsport	Aston Martin Vantage AMR GT4	Aston Martin 4.0 L Turbo V8	429	(United Kingdom) Bradley Ellis	
(United Kingdom) Century Motorsport	Aston Martin Vantage AMR GT4	Aston Martin 4.0 L Turbo V8	429	(United Kingdom) Adam Hatfield	
(United Kingdom) Century Motorsport	Aston Martin Vantage AMR GT4	Aston Martin 4.0 L Turbo V8	429	(United Kingdom) David Holloway	
(United Kingdom) Century Motorsport	Aston Martin Vantage AMR GT4	Aston Martin 4.0 L Turbo V8	429	(United Kingdom) Piers Johnson	
(United States) RHC Jorgensen-Strom by Century	BMW M4 GT4	BMW N55 3.0 L Twin-Turbo I6	450	(United Kingdom) Nathan Freke	
(United States) RHC Jorgensen-Strom by Century	BMW M4 GT4	BMW N55 3.0 L Twin-Turbo I6	450	(United States) Daren Jorgensen	
(United States) RHC Jorgensen-Strom by Century	BMW M4 GT4	BMW N55 3.0 L Twin-Turbo I6	450	(United States) Brett Strom	
(Germany) Lionspeed Racing by Herberth Motorsport	Porsche 718 Cayman GT4 Clubsport	Porsche 3.8 L Flat-6	491	(Norway) Andreas Bakkerud	
(Germany) Lionspeed Racing by Herberth Motorsport	Porsche 718 Cayman GT4 Clubsport	Porsche 3.8 L Flat-6	491	(United States) José Garcia	
(Germany) Lionspeed Racing by Herberth Motorsport	Porsche 718 Cayman GT4 Clubsport	Porsche 3.8 L Flat-6	491	(Germany) Patrick Kolb	
(Germany) Lionspeed Racing by Herberth Motorsport	Porsche 718 Cayman GT4 Clubsport	Porsche 3.8 L Flat-6	491	(United States) Daniel Miller	
TCE (3 entries)
(Switzerland) Wolf-Power Racing	Audi RS 3 LMS TCR (2021)	Volkswagen EA888 2.0 L I4	116	(Kuwait) Mohamed Al Sabah	
(Switzerland) Wolf-Power Racing	Audi RS 3 LMS TCR (2021)	Volkswagen EA888 2.0 L I4	116	(Switzerland) Jasmin Preisig	
(Switzerland) Wolf-Power Racing	Audi RS 3 LMS TCR (2021)	Volkswagen EA888 2.0 L I4	116	(Latvia) Ivars Vallers	
(Thailand) BBR	CUPRA León Competición TCR	Volkswagen EA888 2.0 L I4	159	(Thailand) Anusorn Asiralertsiri	
(Thailand) BBR	CUPRA León Competición TCR	Volkswagen EA888 2.0 L I4	159	(Thailand) Kantadhee Kusiri	
(Thailand) BBR	CUPRA León Competición TCR	Volkswagen EA888 2.0 L I4	159	(Thailand) Kantasak Kusiri	
(Thailand) BBR	CUPRA León Competición TCR	Volkswagen EA888 2.0 L I4	159	(Thailand) Pasarit Promsombat	
(Thailand) BBR	CUPRA León Competición TCR	Volkswagen EA888 2.0 L I4	159	(Thailand) Munkong Sathienthirakul	
(Belgium) AC Motorsport	Audi RS 3 LMS TCR (2021)	Volkswagen EA888 2.0 L I4	188	(France) Stéphane Perrin	
(Belgium) AC Motorsport	Audi RS 3 LMS TCR (2021)	Volkswagen EA888 2.0 L I4	188	(Belgium) Mathieu Detry	
(Belgium) AC Motorsport	Audi RS 3 LMS TCR (2021)	Volkswagen EA888 2.0 L I4	188	(United Kingdom) James Kaye	
TC (2 entries)
(Switzerland) Hofor Racing by Bonk Motorsport	BMW M2 ClubSport Racing	BMW S55B30T0 3.0 L I6	331	(Germany) Hermann Bock	
(Switzerland) Hofor Racing by Bonk Motorsport	BMW M2 ClubSport Racing	BMW S55B30T0 3.0 L I6	331	(Germany) Michael Bonk	
(Switzerland) Hofor Racing by Bonk Motorsport	BMW M2 ClubSport Racing	BMW S55B30T0 3.0 L I6	331	(Switzerland) Martin Kroll	
(Switzerland) Hofor Racing by Bonk Motorsport	BMW M2 ClubSport Racing	BMW S55B30T0 3.0 L I6	331	(Germany) Michael Mayer	
(Switzerland) Hofor Racing by Bonk Motorsport	BMW M2 ClubSport Racing	BMW S55B30T0 3.0 L I6	331	(Germany) Rainer Partl	
(Switzerland) Hofor Racing by Bonk Motorsport	BMW M2 ClubSport Racing	BMW S55B30T0 3.0 L I6	332	(Germany) Hermann Bock	
(Switzerland) Hofor Racing by Bonk Motorsport	BMW M2 ClubSport Racing	BMW S55B30T0 3.0 L I6	332	(Germany) Michael Bonk	
(Switzerland) Hofor Racing by Bonk Motorsport	BMW M2 ClubSport Racing	BMW S55B30T0 3.0 L I6	332	(Switzerland) Martin Kroll	
(Switzerland) Hofor Racing by Bonk Motorsport	BMW M2 ClubSport Racing	BMW S55B30T0 3.0 L I6	332	(Germany) Michael Mayer	
(Switzerland) Hofor Racing by Bonk Motorsport	BMW M2 ClubSport Racing	BMW S55B30T0 3.0 L I6	332	(Germany) Rainer Partl	

GT3 entries
Icon	Class
P	GT3-Pro
Am	GT3-Am
992 entries
Icon	Class
P	992-Pro
Am	992-Am

== Practice ==
Class	No.	Entrant	Driver	Time
GT3	47	Team Kuwait by MRS GT-Racing	(Kuwait) Zaid Ashkanani	1:52.002
GTX	714	(Austria) razoon-more than racing	(Kuwait) Haytham Qarajouli	1:56.535
992	979	(Belgium) Rabdan Motorsport by Speed Lover	(Italy) Enrico Fernando Fulgenzi	1:56.532
GT4	450	(United States) RHC Jorgensen-Strom by Century	(United Kingdom) Nathan Freke	2:02.993
TCR	159	(Thailand) BBR	(Thailand) Kantasak Kusiri	2:00.849
TC	331	(Switzerland) Hofor Racing by Bonk Motorsport	(Germany) Hermann Bock	2:15.859

- Note: Only the fastest car in each class is shown.

== Qualifying ==
=== Qualifying Results ===
Pole positions in each class are indicated in bold.

Pos.	Class	No.	Team	Q1	Q2	Q3	Avg
1	**GT3 Pro**	**47**	**Team Kuwait by MRS GT-Racing**	1:54.582	1:55.066	1:52.111	**1:53.919**
2	GT3 Pro	32	(Netherlands) Team GP-Elite	1:55.150	1:53.215	1:54.827	1:54.397
3	**GT3 Am**	**85**	**(United States) CP Racing**	1:58.098	1:52.721	1:52.468	**1:54.429**
4	**GTX**	**714**	**(Austria) razoon-more than racing**	1:56.288	1:57.244	1:56.123	**1:56.551**
5	GT3 Am	44	(Slovakia) ARC Bratislava	2:00.972	1:56.316	1:55.004	1:57.430
6	**992 Pro**	**955**	**(Romania) Willi Motorsport by Ebimotors**	2:01.377	1:56.331	1:57.732	**1:58.480**
7	992 Pro	909	(Netherlands) Red Camel-Jordans.nl	2:00.850	1:58.016	1:56.905	1:58.590
8	**992 Am**	**979**	**(Belgium) Rabdan Motorsport by Speed Lover**	2:03.340	1:59.556	1:55.517	**1:59.471**
9	992 Am	929	QMMF Racing by HRT Thuraya Qatar	1:58.354	1:57.614	2:03.485	1:59.817
10	**TCR**	**159**	**(Thailand) BBR**	2:02.192	2:00.940	2:00.449	**2:01.193**
11	GTX	701	(France) Vortex V8	1:58.974	2:10.792	2:01.823	2:03.863
12	TCR	188	(Belgium) AC Motorsport	2:05.557	2:02.097	2:04.569	2:04.074
13	**GT4**	**429**	**(United Kingdom) Century Motorsport**	2:07.432	2:03.913	2:02.363	**2:04.569**
14	GT4	450	(United States) RHC Jorgensen-Strom by Century	2:08.164	2:02.977	2:02.991	2:04.710
15	GT4	491	(Germany) Lionspeed Racing by Herberth Motorsport	2:08.792	2:06.246	2:06.812	2:07.283
16	TCR	116	(Switzerland) Autorama Motorsport by Wolf-Power Racing	2:19.049	2:04.700	2:11.970	2:11.906
17	**TC**	**331**	**(Switzerland) Hofor Racing by Bonk Motorsport**	2:13.278	2:16.005	2:26.215	**2:18.499**
18	TC	332	(Switzerland) Hofor Racing by Bonk Motorsport	2:35.543	2:18.234	2:14.662	2:22.813
DNC	GTX	710	(Germany) Leipert Motorsport	No time	No time	No time	No time
DNC	992 Am	928	(Germany) HRT Performance	No time	No time	No time	No time
DNC	992 Am	930	QMMF by HRT Suhail Qatar	No time	No time	No time	No time

== Race ==
=== Race results ===
Class winners are in bold.

Pos	Class	No	Team	Drivers	Car	Laps	Time/Reason
Pos	Class	No	Team	Drivers	Engine	Laps	Time/Reason
1	**GT3 Am**	**85**	**(United States) CP Racing**	**(United States) Charles Espenlaub** **(United States) Joe Foster** **(United States) Shane Lewis** **(United States) Charles Putman**	**Mercedes-AMG GT3 Evo**	**323**	**12:00:13.667**
1	**GT3 Am**	**85**	**(United States) CP Racing**	**(United States) Charles Espenlaub** **(United States) Joe Foster** **(United States) Shane Lewis** **(United States) Charles Putman**	**Mercedes-AMG M159 6.2 L V8**	**323**	**12:00:13.667**
2	**GT3 Pro**	**47**	**Team Kuwait by MRS GT-Racing**	**(Kuwait) Ahmad Al Ghanem** **(Kuwait) Mohammed Al Kazemi** **(Kuwait) Zaid Ashkanani**	**Porsche 911 GT3 R**	**321**	**+2 Laps**
2	**GT3 Pro**	**47**	**Team Kuwait by MRS GT-Racing**	**(Kuwait) Ahmad Al Ghanem** **(Kuwait) Mohammed Al Kazemi** **(Kuwait) Zaid Ashkanani**	**Porsche 4.0 L Flat-6**	**321**	**+2 Laps**
3	**992 Pro**	**909**	**(Netherlands) Red Camel-Jordans.nl**	**(Netherlands) Ivo Breukers** **(Netherlands) Luc Breukers** **(Netherlands) Rik Breukers**	**Porsche 992 GT3 Cup**	**317**	**+6 Laps**
3	**992 Pro**	**909**	**(Netherlands) Red Camel-Jordans.nl**	**(Netherlands) Ivo Breukers** **(Netherlands) Luc Breukers** **(Netherlands) Rik Breukers**	**Porsche 4.0 L Flat-6**	**317**	**+6 Laps**
4	992 Pro	955	(Romania) Willi Motorsport by Ebimotors	(Italy) Fabrizio Broggi (Italy) Sabino de Castro (Romania) Sergiu Nicolae	Porsche 992 GT3 Cup	315	+8 Laps
4	992 Pro	955	(Romania) Willi Motorsport by Ebimotors	(Italy) Fabrizio Broggi (Italy) Sabino de Castro (Romania) Sergiu Nicolae	Porsche 4.0 L Flat-6	315	+8 Laps
5	**992 Am**	**928**	**(Germany) HRT Performance**	**(Netherlands) Gijs Bessem** **(Netherlands) Harry Hilders**	**Porsche 992 GT3 Cup**	**313**	**+10 Laps**
5	**992 Am**	**928**	**(Germany) HRT Performance**	**(Netherlands) Gijs Bessem** **(Netherlands) Harry Hilders**	**Porsche 4.0 L Flat-6**	**313**	**+10 Laps**
6	992 Am	979	(Belgium) Rabdan Motorsport by Speed Lover	(Belgium) Olivier Dons (United Arab Emirates) Saif Al Ameri (Italy) Enrico Fernando Fulgenzi	Porsche 992 GT3 Cup	310	+13 Laps
6	992 Am	979	(Belgium) Rabdan Motorsport by Speed Lover	(Belgium) Olivier Dons (United Arab Emirates) Saif Al Ameri (Italy) Enrico Fernando Fulgenzi	Porsche 4.0 L Flat-6	310	+13 Laps
7	992 Am	929	QMMF by HRT Thuraya Qatar	(Qatar) Abdulla Ali Al-Khelaifi (Qatar) Ibrahim Al-Mannai (Denmark) Anders Fjordbach (Qatar) Hamad Saeed Al Asam	Porsche 992 GT3 Cup	306	+17 Laps
7	992 Am	929	QMMF by HRT Thuraya Qatar	(Qatar) Abdulla Ali Al-Khelaifi (Qatar) Ibrahim Al-Mannai (Denmark) Anders Fjordbach (Qatar) Hamad Saeed Al Asam	Porsche 4.0 L Flat-6	306	+17 Laps
8 DNF	GT3 Pro	32	(Netherlands) Team GP-Elite	(Netherlands) Lucas Groeneveld (Netherlands) Daan van Kuijk (Netherlands) Jesse van Kuijk	Porsche 911 GT3 R	302	Drivetrain
8 DNF	GT3 Pro	32	(Netherlands) Team GP-Elite	(Netherlands) Lucas Groeneveld (Netherlands) Daan van Kuijk (Netherlands) Jesse van Kuijk	Porsche 4.0 L Flat-6	302	Drivetrain
9	992 Pro	930	QMMF by HRT Suhail Qatar	(Qatar) Abdullah Al Abbasi (Qatar) Ghanim Ali Al Maadheed (Qatar) Ibrahim Al-Abdulghani (Germany) Kim Andre Hauschild	Porsche 992 GT3 Cup	302	+21 Laps
9	992 Pro	930	QMMF by HRT Suhail Qatar	(Qatar) Abdullah Al Abbasi (Qatar) Ghanim Ali Al Maadheed (Qatar) Ibrahim Al-Abdulghani (Germany) Kim Andre Hauschild	Porsche 4.0 L Flat-6	302	+21 Laps
10	**GTX**	**710**	**(Germany) Leipert Motorsport**	**(United States) Gregg Gorski** **(United States) Jean-Francois Brunot** **(China) Kerong Li**	**Lamborghini Huracán Super Trofeo Evo**	**300**	**+23 Laps**
10	**GTX**	**710**	**(Germany) Leipert Motorsport**	**(United States) Gregg Gorski** **(United States) Jean-Francois Brunot** **(China) Kerong Li**	**Lamborghini 5.2 L V10**	**300**	**+23 Laps**
11	**GT4**	**429**	**(United Kingdom) Century Motorsport**	**(United Kingdom) Bradley Ellis** **(United Kingdom) Adam Hatfield** **(United Kingdom) David Holloway** **(United Kingdom) Piers Johnson**	**Aston Martin Vantage AMR GT4**	**298**	**+25 Laps**
11	**GT4**	**429**	**(United Kingdom) Century Motorsport**	**(United Kingdom) Bradley Ellis** **(United Kingdom) Adam Hatfield** **(United Kingdom) David Holloway** **(United Kingdom) Piers Johnson**	**Aston Martin 4.0 L Turbo V8**	**298**	**+25 Laps**
12	**TCR**	**159**	**(Thailand) BBR**	**(Thailand) Anusorn Asiralertsiri** **(Thailand) Kantadhee Kusiri** **(Thailand) Kantasak Kusiri** **(Thailand) Pasarit Promsombat** **(Thailand) Munkong Sathienthirakul**	**CUPRA León Competición TCR**	**295**	**+28 Laps**
12	**TCR**	**159**	**(Thailand) BBR**	**(Thailand) Anusorn Asiralertsiri** **(Thailand) Kantadhee Kusiri** **(Thailand) Kantasak Kusiri** **(Thailand) Pasarit Promsombat** **(Thailand) Munkong Sathienthirakul**	**Volkswagen EA888 2.0 L I4**	**295**	**+28 Laps**
13	GT4	450	(United States) RHC Jorgensen-Strom by Century	(United Kingdom) Nathan Freke (United States) Daren Jorgensen (United States) Brett Strom	BMW M4 GT4	295	+28 Laps
13	GT4	450	(United States) RHC Jorgensen-Strom by Century	(United Kingdom) Nathan Freke (United States) Daren Jorgensen (United States) Brett Strom	BMW N55 3.0 L Twin-Turbo I6	295	+28 Laps
14 DNF	GT4	491	(Germany) Lionspeed Racing by Herberth Motorsport	(Norway) Andreas Bakkerud (United States) José Garcia (Germany) Patrick Kolb (United States) Daniel Miller	Porsche 718 Cayman GT4 Clubsport	289	+34 Laps
14 DNF	GT4	491	(Germany) Lionspeed Racing by Herberth Motorsport	(Norway) Andreas Bakkerud (United States) José Garcia (Germany) Patrick Kolb (United States) Daniel Miller	Porsche 3.8 L Flat-6	289	+34 Laps
15	GTX	701	(France) Vortex V8	(France) Lionel Amrouche (France) Philippe Bonnel (Switzerland) Nicolas Nobs	Vortex 1.0 GTX	270	+53 Laps
15	GTX	701	(France) Vortex V8	(France) Lionel Amrouche (France) Philippe Bonnel (Switzerland) Nicolas Nobs	Chevrolet 6.2 L V8	270	+53 Laps
16	**TC**	**332**	**(Switzerland) Hofor Racing by Bonk Motorsport**	**(Germany) Hermann Bock** **(Germany) Michael Bonk** **(Switzerland) Martin Kroll** **(Germany) Michael Mayer** **(Germany) Rainer Partl**	**BMW M2 ClubSport Racing**	**252**	**+71 Laps**
16	**TC**	**332**	**(Switzerland) Hofor Racing by Bonk Motorsport**	**(Germany) Hermann Bock** **(Germany) Michael Bonk** **(Switzerland) Martin Kroll** **(Germany) Michael Mayer** **(Germany) Rainer Partl**	**BMW S55B30T0 3.0 L I6**	**252**	**+71 Laps**
17	TC	331	(Switzerland) Hofor Racing by Bonk Motorsport	(Germany) Hermann Bock (Germany) Michael Bonk (Switzerland) Martin Kroll (Germany) Michael Mayer (Germany) Rainer Partl	BMW M2 ClubSport Racing	247	+76 Laps
17	TC	331	(Switzerland) Hofor Racing by Bonk Motorsport	(Germany) Hermann Bock (Germany) Michael Bonk (Switzerland) Martin Kroll (Germany) Michael Mayer (Germany) Rainer Partl	BMW S55B30T0 3.0 L I6	247	+76 Laps
18	GTX	714	(Austria) Razoon – More than Racing	(Austria) Daniel Drexel (Austria) Dominik Olbert (Kuwait) Haytham Qarajouli (Austria) Laura Kraihamer	KTM X-Bow GT2 Concept	219	+104 Laps
18	GTX	714	(Austria) Razoon – More than Racing	(Austria) Daniel Drexel (Austria) Dominik Olbert (Kuwait) Haytham Qarajouli (Austria) Laura Kraihamer	Audi 2.5 L I5	219	+104 Laps
19	TCR	116	(Switzerland) Wolf-Power Racing	(Kuwait) Mohamed Al Sabah (Switzerland) Jasmin Preisig (Latvia) Ivars Vallers	Audi RS 3 LMS TCR (2021)	190	+133 Laps
19	TCR	116	(Switzerland) Wolf-Power Racing	(Kuwait) Mohamed Al Sabah (Switzerland) Jasmin Preisig (Latvia) Ivars Vallers	Volkswagen EA888 2.0 L I4	190	+133 Laps
20	GT3 Am	44	(Slovakia) ARC Bratislava	(Slovakia) Miro Konôpka (Slovakia) Matej Konôpka (Slovakia) Zdeno Mikulasko	Lamborghini Huracán GT3	182	+141 Laps
20	GT3 Am	44	(Slovakia) ARC Bratislava	(Slovakia) Miro Konôpka (Slovakia) Matej Konôpka (Slovakia) Zdeno Mikulasko	Lamborghini 5.2 L V10	182	+141 Laps
DNC	TCR	188	(Belgium) AC Motorsport	(France) Stéphane Perrin (Belgium) Mathieu Detry (United Kingdom) James Kaye	Audi RS 3 LMS TCR (2021)	142	Wheel hub failure
DNC	TCR	188	(Belgium) AC Motorsport	(France) Stéphane Perrin (Belgium) Mathieu Detry (United Kingdom) James Kaye	Volkswagen EA888 2.0 L I4	142	Wheel hub failure
