= 2016 TCR International Series Buriram round =

Eighth round of the 2016 TCR International Series season

(Thailand) 2016 TCR International Series Buriram round
Round details
- Round 8 of 11 rounds in the 2016 TCR International Series
- Layout of the Chang International Circuit
- Location: Chang International Circuit, Buriram, Thailand
- Course: Permanent racing facility 4.554 km (2.830 mi)

TCR International Series

Race 1
- Date: 28 August 2016
- Laps: 14

Pole position
Driver	(Spain) Pepe Oriola	Team Craft-Bamboo Lukoil
- Time: 1:43.634

Podium
First	(Spain) Pepe Oriola	Team Craft-Bamboo Lukoil
Second	(United Kingdom) James Nash	Team Craft-Bamboo Lukoil
Third	(Italy) Gianni Morbidelli	WestCoast Racing

Fastest lap
Driver	(Italy) Gianni Morbidelli	WestCoast Racing
- Time: 1:44.528 (on lap 5)

Race 2
- Date: 28 August 2016
- Laps: 16

Podium
First	(United Kingdom) James Nash	Team Craft-Bamboo Lukoil
Second	(Russia) Mikhail Grachev	WestCoast Racing
Third	(Serbia) Dušan Borković	B3 Racing Team Hungary

Fastest lap
Driver	(United Kingdom) James Nash	Team Craft-Bamboo Lukoil
- Time: 1:44.251 (on lap 6)

The 2016 TCR International Series Buriram round was the eighth round of the 2016 TCR International Series season. It took place on 27–28 August at the Chang International Circuit.

Pepe Oriola won the first race, starting from pole position and James Nash gained the second one, both driving a SEAT León TCR.

== Ballast ==
Due to the results obtained in the previous round, Stefano Comini received +30 kg, Mikhail Grachev +20 kg and Jean-Karl Vernay +10 kg.

== Classification ==
=== Qualifying ===
Pos.	No.	Driver	Car	Team	Q1	Q2	Grid	Points
1	74	(Spain) Pepe Oriola	SEAT León TCR	(United Kingdom) Team Craft-Bamboo Lukoil	1:44.393	1:43.634	1	5
2	10	(Italy) Gianni Morbidelli	Honda Civic TCR	(Sweden) WestCoast Racing	1:44.109	1:43.635	2	4
3	2	(France) Jean-Karl Vernay	Volkswagen Golf GTI TCR	(Luxembourg) Leopard Racing	1:44.444	1:43.767	3	3
4	1	(Switzerland) Stefano Comini	Volkswagen Golf GTI TCR	(Luxembourg) Leopard Racing	1:44.189	1:43.885	4	2
5	70	(Slovakia) Maťo Homola	SEAT León TCR	B3 Racing Team Hungary	1:44.451	1:43.927	5	1
6	54	(United Kingdom) James Nash	SEAT León TCR	(United Kingdom) Team Craft-Bamboo Lukoil	1:44.340	1:43.994	6	
7	62	(Serbia) Dušan Borković	SEAT León TCR	B3 Racing Team Hungary	1:44.422	1:44.066	7	
8	15	(Thailand) Kantadhee Kusiri	Honda Civic TCR	(Thailand) Team Eakie BBR Kaiten	1:44.488	1:44.104	8	
9	77	(Russia) Sergey Afanasyev	SEAT León TCR	(United Kingdom) Team Craft-Bamboo Lukoil	1:44.658	1:44.344	9	
10	8	(Russia) Mikhail Grachev	Honda Civic TCR	(Sweden) WestCoast Racing	1:44.516	1:44.397	10	
11	9	(Hungary) Attila Tassi	SEAT León TCR	B3 Racing Team Hungary	1:44.628	1:44.532	11	
12	22	(Czech Republic) Petr Fulín	Alfa Romeo Giulietta TCR	(Italy) Mulsanne Racing	1:44.532	No time	12	
13	7	(Georgia (country)) Davit Kajaia	Volkswagen Golf GTI TCR	(Germany) Liqui Moly Team Engstler	1:44.753		13	
14	44	(Thailand) Jack Lemvard	SEAT León Cup Racer	(Thailand) Vattana Motorsport	1:44.628		14	
15	13	(Thailand) Narasak Ittiritpong	Honda Civic TCR	(Thailand) Vattana Motorsport	1:45.108		15	
16	35	(France) Rafaël Galiana	Honda Civic TCR	(Sweden) WestCoast Racing	1:45.371		16	
17	12	(Germany) Alexander Mies	SEAT León Cup Racer	(Thailand) Kratingdaeng Racing Team	1:45.638		17	
18	12	(Finland) Kari-Pekka Laaksonen	SEAT León Cup Racer	(Finland) LMS Racing	1:45.885		18	
19	32	(Italy) Luigi Ferrara	Subaru Impreza WRX STi TCR	(Italy) Top Run Motorsport	1:46.009		18	
20	66	(Thailand) Nattachak Hanjitkasen	Honda Civic TCR	(Thailand) TBN MK Ihere Racing Team	1:46.510		20	
21	11	(Thailand) Grant Supaphongs	SEAT León Cup Racer	(Thailand) Kratingdaeng Racing Team	1:46.648		21	
22	97	(Thailand) Paritat Bulbon	SEAT León Cup Racer	(Thailand) Sloth Racing	1:46.809		22	
23	58	(Taiwan) Chen Jian Hong	SEAT León Cup Racer	(Thailand) Kratingdaeng Racing Team	No time		23^{1}	
24	55	(Thailand) Munkong Sathienthirakul	Volkswagen Golf GTI TCR	(Germany) Liqui Moly Team Engstler	No time		24^{1}	
25	88	(Italy) Michela Cerruti	Alfa Romeo Giulietta TCR	(Italy) Mulsanne Racing	withdrew			
26	90	(Thailand) Rattanin Leenutaphong	SEAT León Cup Racer	(Thailand) Yontrakit Racing Team	withdrew			

- ^1 — Chen Jian Hong and Munkong Sathienthirakul were moved to the back of the grid for having not set a time within the 107% limit.

=== Race 1 ===
Pos.	No.	Driver	Car	Team	Laps	Time/Retired	Grid	Points
1	74	(Spain) Pepe Oriola	SEAT León TCR	(United Kingdom) Team Craft-Bamboo Lukoil	14	24:32.596	1	25
2	54	(United Kingdom) James Nash	SEAT León TCR	(United Kingdom) Team Craft-Bamboo Lukoil	14	+1.280	6	18
3	10	(Italy) Gianni Morbidelli	Honda Civic TCR	(Sweden) WestCoast Racing	14	+2.410	2	15
4	1	(Switzerland) Stefano Comini	Volkswagen Golf GTI TCR	(Luxembourg) Leopard Racing	14	+6.633	4	12
5	2	(France) Jean-Karl Vernay	Volkswagen Golf GTI TCR	(Luxembourg) Leopard Racing	14	+7.467	3	10
6	15	(Thailand) Kantadhee Kusiri	Honda Civic TCR	(Thailand) Team Eakie BBR Kaiten	14	+11.551	8	8
7	62	(Serbia) Dušan Borković	SEAT León TCR	B3 Racing Team Hungary	14	+14.115	7	6
8	9	(Hungary) Attila Tassi	SEAT León TCR	B3 Racing Team Hungary	14	+20.302	11	4
9	77	(Russia) Sergey Afanasyev	SEAT León TCR	(United Kingdom) Team Craft-Bamboo Lukoil	14	+22.446	9	2
10	7	(Georgia (country)) Davit Kajaia	Volkswagen Golf GTI TCR	(Germany) Liqui Moly Team Engstler	14	+23.892	13	1
11	13	(Thailand) Narasak Ittiritpong	Honda Civic TCR	(Thailand) Vattana Motorsport	14	+26.081	15	
12	55	(Thailand) Munkong Sathienthirakul	Volkswagen Golf GTI TCR	(Germany) Liqui Moly Team Engstler	14	+37.340	24	
13	12	(Germany) Alexander Mies	SEAT León Cup Racer	(Thailand) Kratingdaeng Racing Team	14	+38.790	17	
14	35	(France) Rafaël Galiana	Honda Civic TCR	(Sweden) WestCoast Racing	14	+44.808	16	
15	58	(Taiwan) Chen Jian Hong	SEAT León Cup Racer	(Thailand) Kratingdaeng Racing Team	14	+52.168	23	
16	66	(Thailand) Nattachak Hanjitkasen	Honda Civic TCR	(Thailand) TBN MK Ihere Racing Team	14	+52.444	20	
17	53	(Finland) Kari-Pekka Laaksonen	SEAT León Cup Racer	(Finland) LMS Racing	14	+53.234	18	
18	97	(Thailand) Paritat Bulbon	SEAT León Cup Racer	(Thailand) Sloth Racing	14	+58.293	22	
19	11	(Thailand) Grant Supaphongs	SEAT León Cup Racer	(Thailand) Kratingdaeng Racing Team	14	+1:23.558	21	
20	22	(Czech Republic) Petr Fulín	Alfa Romeo Giulietta TCR	(Italy) Mulsanne Racing	12	Accident	12	
21	8	(Russia) Mikhail Grachev	Honda Civic TCR	(Sweden) WestCoast Racing	11	+3 laps	10	
Ret	32	(Italy) Luigi Ferrara	Subaru Impreza WRX STi TCR	(Italy) Top Run Motorsport	8	Engine	19	
Ret	70	(Slovakia) Maťo Homola	SEAT León TCR	B3 Racing Team Hungary	5	Driveshaft	5	
Ret	44	(Thailand) Jack Lemvard	SEAT León TCR	(Thailand) Vattana Motorsport	1	Collision	14	
WD	88	(Italy) Michela Cerruti	Alfa Romeo Giulietta TCR	(Italy) Mulsanne Racing				
WD	90	(Thailand) Rattanin Leenutaphong	SEAT León TCR	(Thailand) Yontrakit Racing Team				

=== Race 2 ===
Pos.	No.	Driver	Car	Team	Laps	Time/Retired	Grid	Points
1	54	(United Kingdom) James Nash	SEAT León TCR	(United Kingdom) Team Craft-Bamboo Lukoil	16	30:31.095	5	25
2	8	(Russia) Mikhail Grachev	Honda Civic TCR	(Sweden) WestCoast Racing	16	+7.272	1	18
3	62	(Serbia) Dušan Borković	SEAT León TCR	B3 Racing Team Hungary	16	+11.332	4	15
4	1	(Switzerland) Stefano Comini	Volkswagen Golf GTI TCR	(Luxembourg) Leopard Racing	16	+12.122	7	12
5	7	(Georgia (country)) Davit Kajaia	Volkswagen Golf GTI TCR	(Germany) Liqui Moly Team Engstler	16	+15.181	13	10
6	9	(Hungary) Attila Tassi	SEAT León TCR	B3 Racing Team Hungary	16	+18.516	11	8
7	77	(Russia) Sergey Afanasyev	SEAT León TCR	(United Kingdom) Team Craft-Bamboo Lukoil	16	+18.753	2	6
8	2	(France) Jean-Karl Vernay	Volkswagen Golf GTI TCR	(Luxembourg) Leopard Racing	16	+19.870	8	4
9	15	(Thailand) Kantadhee Kusiri	Honda Civic TCR	(Thailand) Team Eakie BBR Kaiten	16	+20.208	3	2
10	70	(Slovakia) Maťo Homola	SEAT León TCR	B3 Racing Team Hungary	16	+20.538	6	1
11	74	(Spain) Pepe Oriola	SEAT León TCR	(United Kingdom) Team Craft-Bamboo Lukoil	16	+23.276	10	
12	12	(Germany) Alexander Mies	SEAT León Cup Racer	(Thailand) Kratingdaeng Racing Team	16	+27.736	16	
13	53	(Finland) Kari-Pekka Laaksonen	SEAT León Cup Racer	(Finland) LMS Racing	16	+34.406	17	
14	11	(Thailand) Grant Supaphongs	SEAT León Cup Racer	(Thailand) Kratingdaeng Racing Team	16	+39.262	20	
15	58	(Taiwan) Chen Jian Hong	SEAT León Cup Racer	(Thailand) Kratingdaeng Racing Team	16	+46.479	22	
16	97	(Thailand) Paritat Bulbon	SEAT León Cup Racer	(Thailand) Sloth Racing	16	+55.815	21	
17	44	(Thailand) Jack Lemvard	SEAT León TCR	(Thailand) Vattana Motorsport	16	+1:03.520^{3}	24^{2}	
Ret	13	(Thailand) Narasak Ittiritpong	Honda Civic TCR	(Thailand) Vattana Motorsport	14	Collision	14	
Ret	55	(Thailand) Munkong Sathienthirakul	Volkswagen Golf GTI TCR	(Germany) Liqui Moly Team Engstler	13	Collision^{3}	23	
Ret	35	(France) Rafaël Galiana	Honda Civic TCR	(Sweden) WestCoast Racing	12	Puncture	15	
Ret	66	(Thailand) Nattachak Hanjitkasen	Honda Civic TCR	(Thailand) TBN MK Ihere Racing Team	6	Technical	19	
Ret	10	(Italy) Gianni Morbidelli	Honda Civic TCR	(Sweden) WestCoast Racing	1	Accident	9	
DNS	22	(Czech Republic) Petr Fulín	Alfa Romeo Giulietta TCR	(Italy) Mulsanne Racing		Accident	12	
DNS	32	(Italy) Luigi Ferrara	Subaru Impreza WRX STi TCR	(Italy) Top Run Motorsport		Engine	18	
WD	88	(Italy) Michela Cerruti	Alfa Romeo Giulietta TCR	(Italy) Mulsanne Racing				
WD	90	(Thailand) Rattanin Leenutaphong	SEAT León TCR	(Thailand) Yontrakit Racing Team				

Notes

- ^2 — Jack Lemvard was sent to the back of the grid for Race 2, for having broken parc fermé rules.
- ^3 — Jack Lemvard and Munkong Sathienthirakul was given a 30-second penalty each for overtaking Rafaël Galiana under yellow flag conditions.

== Standings after the event ==
Drivers' Championship standings

	Pos	Driver	Points
2	1	(United Kingdom) James Nash	204
	2	(Spain) Pepe Oriola	197
2	3	(Switzerland) Stefano Comini	194
	4	(France) Jean-Karl Vernay	163
1	5	(Italy) Gianni Morbidelli	150

Model of the Year standings

Pos	Car	Points
1	SEAT León	592
2	Volkswagen Golf GTI TCR	473
3	Honda Civic TCR	424
4	Alfa Romeo Giulietta TCR	71
5	Peugeot 308 Racing Cup	24

Teams' Championship standings

Pos	Driver	Points
1	(United Kingdom) Team Craft-Bamboo Lukoil	484
2	(Luxembourg) Leopard Racing	365
3	(Sweden) WestCoast Racing	349
4	B3 Racing Team Hungary	323
5	(Germany) Liqui Moly Team Engstler	120

- Note: Only the top five positions are included for both sets of drivers' standings.
