= 2018 TCR Asia Series =

Car racing competition

The 2018 TCR Asia Series season is the fourth season of the TCR Asia Series. For the first time at the first three events of TCR Asia, the South-East Asia Cup will be held.

== Teams and drivers ==
Team	Car	No.	Drivers	Class	Rounds
(Malaysia) R Engineering	Honda Civic Type R TCR (FK2)	2	(Malaysia) Akash Nandy		1
(Malaysia) R Engineering	Honda Civic Type R TCR (FK2)	23	(Malaysia) Abdul Kaathir		1
(Macau) Elegant Racing Team	SEAT León TCR	3	(Macau) Alex Liu	Cup	1–3
(Macau) Elegant Racing Team	CUPRA León TCR	3	(Macau) Alex Liu	Cup	4–5
(Macau) Elegant Racing Team	CUPRA León TCR	30	(Macau) Kelvin Wong	Cup	4–5
(Macau) Elegant Racing Team	SEAT León TCR	30	(Macau) Kelvin Wong	Cup	1–3
(Germany) Liqui Moly Team Engstler	Volkswagen Golf GTI TCR	8	(Germany) Luca Engstler		1–4
(Germany) Liqui Moly Team Engstler	Volkswagen Golf GTI TCR	108	(Germany) Luca Engstler		5
(Germany) Liqui Moly Team Engstler	Volkswagen Golf GTI TCR	29	(Malaysia) Mitchell Cheah		All
(Germany) Liqui Moly Team Engstler	Volkswagen Golf GTI TCR	32	(Ecuador) Diego Moran		All
(Hong Kong) Maximum Racing	Honda Civic TCR (FK2)	5	(Hong Kong) Clement Tong	Cup	2, 4
(Hong Kong) Maximum Racing	Honda Civic TCR (FK2)	22	(Hong Kong) Ivan Szeto	Cup	1, 3, 5
(Hong Kong) Maximum Racing	Honda Civic Type R TCR (FK2)	28	(Hong Kong) Lo Sze Ho		1–4
(Malaysia) Viper Niza Racing	SEAT León TCR	65	(Malaysia) Douglas Khoo	Cup	1–3
(Malaysia) Viper Niza Racing	CUPRA León TCR	65	(Malaysia) Douglas Khoo	Cup	4–5
Entries ineligible to score points
(Malaysia) Viper Niza Racing	CUPRA León TCR	1	(Thailand) Kantadhee Kusiri		4
(Macau) Son Veng Racing Team	Volkswagen Golf GTi TCR	6	(Macau) Leong Ian Veng		5
(Macau) Son Veng Racing Team	Volkswagen Golf GTi TCR	6	(Hong Kong) Eric Lam		5
(Macau) MacPro Racing	Honda Civic Type R TCR (FK8)	8	(Macau) Miguel Kong		5
(Macau) MacPro Racing	Honda Civic Type R TCR (FK8)	8	(Macau) Kevin Lam		5
(Macau) MacPro Racing	Honda Civic Type R TCR (FK8)	88	(Macau) Eurico de Jesus		5
(Macau) MacPro Racing	Honda Civic Type R TCR (FK8)	88	(Macau) Henry Ho		5
(Hong Kong) Teamwork Motorsport	Volkswagen Golf GTi TCR	11	(Hong Kong) Alex Hui		5
(Hong Kong) Teamwork Motorsport	Volkswagen Golf GTi TCR	11	(Hong Kong) Sunny Wong		5
(South Korea) BrandNew Racing	Volkswagen Golf GTI TCR	11	(Hong Kong) Alex Hui		4
(South Korea) BrandNew Racing	Volkswagen Golf GTI TCR	20	(South Korea) Andrew Kim		4
(Thailand) Billionaire Boy Racing	Honda Civic Type R TCR (FK2)	15	(Thailand) Chariya Nuya	AM	1–4
(South Korea) E-Rain Motorsport	Hyundai i30 N TCR	16	(South Korea) Lee Do Hyeon		4
(China) T.A Motorsport	Audi RS 3 LMS TCR	26	(Macau) Filipe de Souza		5
(China) T.A Motorsport	Audi RS 3 LMS TCR	26	(Macau) Ryan Wong		5
(Thailand) Alphafactory Racing Team by Pulzar	SEAT León TCR	33	(Thailand) Jakraphan Davee	AM	1–3
(Thailand) Vattana Motorsport	Honda Civic Type R TCR (FK2)	59	(Thailand) Pattarapol Vongprai	AM	1–3
(China) Hexin Racing	Volkswagen Golf GTi TCR	60	(China) Chang Shuai		5
(China) Hexin Racing	Volkswagen Golf GTi TCR	60	(China) Chen Zhen		5
(Thailand) TBN MK Ihere Racing Team	Honda Civic Type R TCR (FK2)	66	(Thailand) Nattachak Hanjitkasen	AM	1–4
(China) Liqui Moly HE Racing	Volkswagen Golf GTi TCR	68	(China) Li Xue Feng		5
(China) Liqui Moly HE Racing	Volkswagen Golf GTi TCR	68	(China) Tian Li Ying		5
(South Korea) Indigo Racing	Hyundai i30 N TCR	87	(South Korea) Charlie Kang		4
(South Korea) Indigo Racing	Hyundai i30 N TCR	97	(South Korea) Cho Hoon Hyun		4
(Thailand) Morin Racing Team by Sunoco	SEAT León TCR	96	(Thailand) Nattanid Leewattanavaragul	AM	1–3
(South Korea) DreamRacer Racing Team	Honda Civic Type R TCR (FK8)	101	(South Korea) Kim Byoung Hyun		4
(South Korea) KMSA Motorsport	Hyundai i30 N TCR	103	(South Korea) Kang Dong Woo		4

== Calendar and results ==
The provisional 2018 schedule was announced on 17 January 2018, with five events scheduled.

Rnd.		Circuit	Date	Pole position	Fastest lap	Winning driver	Winning team	Supporting
1	1	(Malaysia) Sepang International Circuit, Kuala Lumpur	31 March	(Germany) Luca Engstler	(Ecuador) Diego Moran	(Germany) Luca Engstler	(Germany) Liqui Moly Team Engstler	South-East Asia Cup; TCR Thailand Series
1	2	(Malaysia) Sepang International Circuit, Kuala Lumpur	1 April		(Malaysia) Mitchell Cheah	(Malaysia) Mitchell Cheah	(Germany) Liqui Moly Team Engstler	South-East Asia Cup; TCR Thailand Series
2	3	(Thailand) Chang International Circuit, Buriram	2 June	(Germany) Luca Engstler	(Germany) Luca Engstler	(Malaysia) Mitchell Cheah	(Germany) Liqui Moly Team Engstler	South-East Asia Cup; TCR Thailand Series
2	4	(Thailand) Chang International Circuit, Buriram	3 June		(Germany) Luca Engstler	(Ecuador) Diego Moran	(Germany) Liqui Moly Team Engstler	South-East Asia Cup; TCR Thailand Series
3	5	(Thailand) Bangsaen Street Circuit, Chonburi	14 July	(Germany) Luca Engstler	(Hong Kong) Lo Sze Ho	(Macau) Alex Liu (Note: Actual victory in the race was taken by TCR Thailand Series driver Pattarapol Vongprai.)	(Macau) Elegant Racing Team	South-East Asia Cup; TCR Thailand Series
3	6	(Thailand) Bangsaen Street Circuit, Chonburi	15 July		(Hong Kong) Lo Sze Ho	(Hong Kong) Lo Sze Ho	(Hong Kong) Maximum Racing	South-East Asia Cup; TCR Thailand Series
4	7	(South Korea) Korea International Circuit, Yeongam	26 August	(Germany) Luca Engstler (Note: Actual pole position was taken by guest driver Kantadhee Kusiri.)	(Germany) Luca Engstler (Note: Actual fastest lap of the race was recorded by guest driver Kantadhee Kusiri.)	(Germany) Luca Engstler (Note: Actual victory in the race was taken by guest driver Kantadhee Kusiri.)	(Germany) Liqui Moly Team Engstler	TCR Korea Series
4	8	(South Korea) Korea International Circuit, Yeongam	26 August		(Germany) Luca Engstler	(Germany) Luca Engstler	(Germany) Liqui Moly Team Engstler	TCR Korea Series
5	9	(China) Shanghai International Circuit, Shanghai	4 October	(Malaysia) Mitchell Cheah	(Malaysia) Mitchell Cheah	(Germany) Luca Engstler	(Germany) Liqui Moly Team Engstler	TCR China Series
5	10	(China) Shanghai International Circuit, Shanghai	5 October		(Germany) Luca Engstler	(Germany) Luca Engstler	(Germany) Liqui Moly Team Engstler	TCR China Series
INV		(China) Shanghai International Circuit, Shanghai	7 October	(Macau) Alex Liu (Hong Kong) Kenneth Look	(Germany) Luca Engstler (Ecuador) Diego Moran (France) Théo Coicaud	(Germany) Luca Engstler (Ecuador) Diego Moran (France) Théo Coicaud	(Germany) Liqui Moly Team Engstler	SIC888 Endurance

== Championship standings ==
=== Drivers' championship ===
Pos	Driver	SEP		BUR		BNS		YEO		SHA		Points
1	(Germany) Luca Engstler	1^{1}	3	Ret^{1}	2	6^{1}	Ret	2^{1}	1	1^{2}	1	197
2	(Malaysia) Mitchell Cheah	2^{2}	1	1^{3}	11	Ret	3	14†^{2}	3	2^{1}	2	173
3	(Ecuador) Diego Moran	9^{3}	Ret	2^{2}	1	DNS^{5}	2	NC	4	3^{3}	3	127
4	(Macau) Wong Kiang Kuan	10	5	7	7	5	5	5^{3}	Ret	Ret^{5}	5	106
5	(Hong Kong) Lo Sze Ho	3^{4}	2	4	12	8^{2}	1	Ret^{5}	DNS			98
6	(Malaysia) Douglas Khoo	13	11	10	8	Ret	8	13	13	9	8	82
7	(Macau) Alex Liu	11	6	6^{4}	Ret	4	Ret	6^{4}	Ret	Ret	Ret	69
8	(Hong Kong) Ivan Szeto	Ret	7			DNS	DNS			7	11	26
9	(Malaysia) Abdul Kaathir	5	4									22
10	(Hong Kong) Clement Tong			11	10			DNS	DNS			16
11	(Malaysia) Akash Nandy	4^{5}	Ret									13
Drivers ineligible to score points
	(Thailand) Kantadhee Kusiri							1	2			-
	(Thailand) Pattarapol Vongprai	6	10	3	4	1	Ret					-
	(Thailand) Nattanid Leewattanavaragul	8	Ret	12	6	2	7					-
	(Thailand) Jakraphan Davee	12	8	8	5	3	4					-
	(Thailand) Chariya Nuya	7	9	5	3	Ret	9	12	6			-
	(South Korea) Andrew Kim							3	10			-
	(Hong Kong) Alex Hui							4	14	Ret	4	-
	(Hong Kong) Sunny Wong									Ret	4	-
	(Macau) Henry Ho (Macau) Eurico de Jesus									4	EX	-
	(Macau) Filipe de Souza (Macau) Ryan Wong									5	6	-
	(South Korea) Kang Byung Hui							10	5			-
	(Thailand) Nattachak Hanjitkasen	14	Ret	9	9	7	6	8	7			-
	(China) Tian Yi Ling (China) Xue Li									6	10	-
	(South Korea) Kim Byoung Hyun							7	9			-
	(China) Ka Lam (Macau) Kin Kong									10	7	-
	(Macau) Leong Ian Weng (Macau) Wai Lam									8	12	-
	(South Korea) Kang Dong Woo							Ret	8			-
	(South Korea) Cho Hoon Hyun							9	11			-
	(China) Shuai Chang (China) Zen Chen									Ret	9	-
	(South Korea) Lee Do Hyeon							11	12			-

=== Teams' championship ===
Pos	Driver	SEP		BUR		BNS		YEO		SHA		Points
1	(Germany) Liqui Moly Team Engstler	1^{1}	1	1^{3}	1	6^{1}	2	2^{1}	1	1^{2}	1	425
1	(Germany) Liqui Moly Team Engstler	2^{2}	3	2^{2}	2	Ret	3	14†^{2}	3	2^{1}	2	425
2	(Macau) Elegant Racing Team	10	5	6^{4}	7	4	5	5^{3}	Ret	Ret^{5}	5	185
2	(Macau) Elegant Racing Team	11	6	7	Ret	5	Ret	6^{4}	Ret	Ret	Ret	185
3	(Hong Kong) Maximum Racing	3^{3}	2	4	10	8^{2}	1			7	11	149
3	(Hong Kong) Maximum Racing	Ret	7	11	12	DNS	DNS					149
4	(Malaysia) Viper Niza Racing	13	11	10	8	Ret	8	13	13	9	8	93
5	(Malaysia) R Engineering	4^{4}	4									37
5	(Malaysia) R Engineering	5^{5}	Ret									37
Teams ineligible to score points
	(Thailand) Vattana Motorsport	6	10	3	4	1	Ret					-
	(Thailand) Billionaire Boy Racing	7	9	5	3	Ret	9	12	6			-
	(Thailand) Alphafactory Racing Team by Pulzar	12	8	8	5	3	4					-
	(Thailand) Morin Racing Team by Sunoco	8	Ret	12	6	2	7					-
	(Thailand) TBN MK Ihere Racing Team	14	Ret	9	9	7	6	8	7			-
	(Malaysia) Viper Niza Racing							1	2			-
	(South Korea) E-Rain Motorsport							3	10			-
	(Hong Kong) Teamwork Brand New Racing							4	14			-
	(South Korea) DreamRacer Racing Team							7	9			-
	(South Korea) Indigo Racing							9	11			-
	(South Korea) Indigo Racing							EX	EX			-
	(South Korea) KMSA Motorsport							Ret	8			-
