= 2018 TCR Thailand Touring Car Championship =

The 2018 TCR Thailand Touring Car Championship was the third season of the TCR Thailand Touring Car Championship. The championship ran within the Thailand Super Series' events.

== Teams and drivers ==
All teams and drivers were Thai registered

Team	Car	No.	Drivers	Class	Rounds
Billionaire Boys Racing	Honda Civic Type R TCR (FK2)	15	Chariya Nuya	AM	All
Alphafactory Racing Team by Pulzar	SEAT León TCR	33	Jakraphan Davee	AM	All
Vattana Motorsport	Honda Civic Type R TCR (FK2)	59	Pattarapol Vongprai	AM	All
TBN MK Ihere Racing Team	Honda Civic Type R TCR (FK2)	66	Nattachak Hanjitkasen	AM	All
Morin Racing Team by Sunoco	SEAT León TCR	96	Nattanid Leewattanavaragul	AM	All

== Calendar and results ==
The 2018 schedule was announced in December 2017. The first three events will support the 2018 TCR Asia Series, which also marks the first time the series has held a round outside of Thailand.

Rnd.		Circuit	Date	Pole position	Fastest lap	Winning driver	Winning team	Supporting
1	1	(Malaysia) Sepang International Circuit, Kuala Lumpur	1 April	Chariya Nuya	Chariya Nuya	Pattarapol Vongprai	Vattana Motorsport	TCR Asia Series; South-East Asia Cup
1	2	(Malaysia) Sepang International Circuit, Kuala Lumpur	1 April		Chariya Nuya	Jakraphan Davee	Alphafactory Racing Team by Pulzar	TCR Asia Series; South-East Asia Cup
2	3	(Thailand) Chang International Circuit, Buriram	31 May–3 June	Jakraphan Davee	Pattarapol Vongprai	Pattarapol Vongprai	Vattana Motorsport	TCR Asia Series; South-East Asia Cup
2	4	(Thailand) Chang International Circuit, Buriram	31 May–3 June		Pattarapol Vongprai	Chariya Nuya	Billionaire Boy Racing	TCR Asia Series; South-East Asia Cup
3	5	(Thailand) Bangsaen Street Circuit, Chonburi	11–15 July	Nattanid Leewattanavaragul	Pattarapol Vongprai	Pattarapol Vongprai	Vattana Motorsport	TCR Asia Series; South-East Asia Cup
3	6	(Thailand) Bangsaen Street Circuit, Chonburi	11–15 July		Nattanid Leewattanavaragul	Jakraphan Davee	Alphafactory Racing Team by Pulzar	TCR Asia Series; South-East Asia Cup
4	7	(Thailand) Chang International Circuit, Buriram	25–28 October	Jakraphan Davee	Jakraphan Davee	Jakraphan Davee	Alphafactory Racing Team by Pulzar	
4	8	(Thailand) Chang International Circuit, Buriram	25–28 October		Chariya Nuya	Chariya Nuya	Billionaire Boy Racing	

== Drivers' championship ==
Pos	Driver	SEP		BUR		BNS		BUR		Points
Pos	Driver	RD1	RD2	RD1	RD2	RD1	RD2	RD1	RD2	Points
1	Jakraphan Davee	4	1	3	3	3	1	1	3	147
2	Pattarapol Vongprai	1	3	1	2	1	Ret	4	4	132
3	Chariya Nuya	2	2	2	1	Ret	4	3	1	131
4	Nattanid Leewattanavaragul	3	Ret	5	4	2	3	2	2	106
5	Nattachak Hanjitkasen	5	Ret	4	5	4	2	5	5	82
