= 2016–17 TCR Thailand Touring Car Championship =

The 2016–17 TCR Thailand Touring Car Championship is the first season of the TCR Thailand Touring Car Championship. The championship will run within the Thailand Super Series' events.

== Teams and drivers ==
Team	Car	No.	Drivers	Class	Rounds
(Thailand) Kratingdaeng Racing Team	SEAT León Cup Racer	2	(Germany) Alexander Mies	PA	2–3, 5
(Thailand) Kratingdaeng Racing Team	SEAT León Cup Racer	11	(Thailand) Grant Supaphongs	PA	1–3, 5
(Thailand) Kratingdaeng Racing Team	SEAT León Cup Racer	58	(Taiwan) Chen Jian Hong	AM	1–3, 5
(Thailand) Sloth Racing	SEAT León Cup Racer	7	(Thailand) Paritat Bulbon	PA	1–5
(Thailand) Vattana Motorsport	Honda Civic TCR	59	(Thailand) Narasak Ittiritpong	PA	2–5
(Thailand) Vattana Motorsport	SEAT León Cup Racer	44	(Thailand) Jack Lemvard	PA	All
(Thailand) Team Eakie BBR Kaiten (Thailand) Billionaire Boys Racing	Honda Civic TCR	15	(Thailand) Kantadhee Kusiri	PA	3, 5
(Thailand) Team Eakie BBR Kaiten (Thailand) Billionaire Boys Racing	Honda Civic TCR	77	(Thailand) Chariya Nuya	AM	4
(Thailand) TBN MK Ihere Racing Team	Honda Civic TCR	26	(Thailand) Wijak Lertprasertpakorn	AM	1–2
(Thailand) TBN MK Ihere Racing Team	Honda Civic TCR	66	(Thailand) Nattachak Hanjitkasen	AM	All
(Thailand) Yontrakit Racing Team	SEAT León Cup Racer	38	(Thailand) Rattanin Leenutaphong	AM	4
(Malaysia) Viper Niza Racing	SEAT León Cup Racer	65	(Malaysia) Douglas Khoo	AM	5
Singha Motorsport Team Thailand	SEAT León Cup Racer	89	(Netherlands) Carlo van Dam	PA	1–2, 4–5

Icon	Class
PA	Pro-Am
AM	Am

== Calendar and results ==
The 2016 schedule was announced in February 2016.

Rnd.		Circuit	Date	Pole position	Fastest lap	Winning driver	Winning team
2016
1	1	Chang International Circuit, Buriram	21 May	(Netherlands) Carlo van Dam	(Netherlands) Carlo van Dam	(Netherlands) Carlo van Dam	Singha Motorsport Team Thailand
1	2	Chang International Circuit, Buriram	22 May		(Netherlands) Carlo van Dam	(Netherlands) Carlo van Dam	Singha Motorsport Team Thailand
2	3	Chang International Circuit, Buriram	9 July	(Thailand) Narasak Ittiritpong	(Thailand) Narasak Ittiritpong	(Thailand) Narasak Ittiritpong	(Thailand) Vattana Motorsport
2	4	Chang International Circuit, Buriram	10 July		(Thailand) Narasak Ittiritpong	(Netherlands) Carlo van Dam	Singha Motorsport Team Thailand
3	5	Chang International Circuit, Buriram	28 August	(Thailand) Kantadhee Kusiri	(Thailand) Kantadhee Kusiri	(Thailand) Kantadhee Kusiri	(Thailand) Team Eakie BBR Kaiten
3	6	Chang International Circuit, Buriram	28 August		(Thailand) Kantadhee Kusiri	(Thailand) Kantadhee Kusiri	(Thailand) Team Eakie BBR Kaiten
4	7	Bira International Circuit, Pattaya	10 September	(Thailand) Jack Lemvard	(Thailand) Jack Lemvard	(Thailand) Jack Lemvard	(Thailand) Vattana Motorsport
4	8	Bira International Circuit, Pattaya	11 September		(Thailand) Jack Lemvard	(Thailand) Jack Lemvard	(Thailand) Vattana Motorsport
2017 (Note: Due to the death of the King of Thailand, the series finale in Bangsaen was cancelled. The finale was rescheduled to be held in February 2017.)
5	9	Bangsaen Street Circuit, Chonburi	26 February	(Thailand) Kantadhee Kusiri	(Thailand) Kantadhee Kusiri	(Thailand) Kantadhee Kusiri	(Thailand) Billionaire Boys Racing
5	10	Bangsaen Street Circuit, Chonburi	26 February		(Thailand) Kantadhee Kusiri	(Thailand) Kantadhee Kusiri	(Thailand) Billionaire Boys Racing

== Drivers' championship ==
Only the best 8 results counted for the final classification.

Pos.	Driver	BUR		BUR		BUR		PAT		CHO		Total	Drop	Pts.
Pos.	Driver	RD1	RD2	RD1	RD2	RD1	RD2	RD1	RD2	RD1	RD2	Total	Drop	Pts.
Pro-Am
1	(Netherlands) Carlo van Dam	**1**	1	2	1			3	**3**	2	3	156		156
2	(Thailand) Jack Lemvard	3	2	4	**2**	Ret	17	**1**	1	3	2	159	10	149
3	(Thailand) Narasak Ittiritpong			**1**	7	11	18†	2	2	Ret	4	109		109
4	(Thailand) Kantadhee Kusiri					**6**	**9**			**1**	1	100		100
5	(Thailand) Grant Supaphongs	4	**5**	7	5	19	14			4	**5**	100		100
6	(Thailand) Paritat Bulbon	Ret	6	6	6	18	16	6	7	7	8	100	8	92
7	(Germany) Alexander Mies			3	Ret	13	12			DNS	DNS	48		48
Am
1	(Taiwan) Chen Jian Hong	**2**	3	5	**3**	15	15			**5**	**6**	200		200
2	(Thailand) Nattachak Hanjitkasen	6	4	**8**	4	**16**	**Ret**	7	5	6	7	156	15	141
3	(Thailand) Rattanin Leenutaphong							5	**4**			43		43
4	(Thailand) Chariya Nuya							**4**	6			40		40
5	(Thailand) Wijak Lertprasertpakorn	5	**7**	DNS	DNS							33		33
6	(Malaysia) Douglas Khoo									8	9	30		30
Pos.	Driver	BUR		BUR		BUR		PAT		CHO		Total	Drop	Pts.

Colour	Result
Gold	Winner
Silver	Second place
Bronze	Third place
Green	Points classification
Blue	Non-points classification
Blue	Non-classified finish (NC)
Purple	Retired, not classified (Ret)
Red	Did not qualify (DNQ)
Red	Did not pre-qualify (DNPQ)
Black	Disqualified (DSQ)
White	Did not start (DNS)
White	Withdrew (WD)
White	Race cancelled (C)
Blank	Did not practice (DNP)
Blank	Did not arrive (DNA)
Blank	Excluded (EX)

**Bold** – Pole
Italics – Fastest Lap

Notes:

- † – Drivers did not finish the race, but were classified as they completed over 75% of the race distance.
