= William O'Brien (racing driver) =

- Nationality: American
- Born: 23 February 1959 (age 67) Bridgewater, New Jersey, U.S.

TCR International Series career
- Debut season: 2016
- Current team: TeamWork Motorsport
- Car number: 27
- Starts: 2

Previous series
- 2016 2015 2015 2015 2014 2013 2013, 16 2013-15: TCR Asia Series; KL City Grand Prix; Macau Road Sport Challenge; Hong Kong Roadsports Challenge; 25 Hours at Spa; Touring Car Series Asia; Zhuhai 500km Zhuhai Pan Delta Racing Festival

Championship titles
- 2013 2013, 16 2013-15: Touring Car Series Asia, Class B Zhuhai 500km, Class A Zhuhai Pan Delta Racing Festival Circuit Hero I, Class A

William E. O'Brien (born 23 February 1959) is a Hong Kong-based American racing driver currently competing in the TCR International Series and TCR Asia Series. Having previously competed in the Touring Car Series Asia, KL City Grand Prix and Zhuhai Pan Delta Racing Festival amongst others.

== Racing career ==
O'Brien began his career in 2013 in the Zhuhai Pan Delta Racing Festival, he won the Circuit Hero I, A class three times from 2013 to 2015. He also took part in the Zhuhai 500km in 2013, winning Class A, he also raced in the Asian Touring Car Series that year winning Class B. For 2014, he took part in the 25 hours of Spa Fun Cup race, finishing third in the race. He switched to the Hong Kong Roadsports Challenge for 2015 finishing third in the championship standings that year. He also raced in the Macau Road Sport Challenge and KL City Grand Prix in 2015. In 2016, he again raced in the Zhuhai 500km race, again winning the A class. He switched to the TCR Asia Series for 2016, joining the series with TeamWork Motorsport.

In September 2016, it was announced that O'Brien would race in the TCR International Series, driving a Volkswagen Golf GTI TCR for TeamWork Motorsport.

== Racing record ==
=== Complete TCR International Series results ===
(key) (Races in bold indicate pole position) (Races in italics indicate fastest lap)

Year	Team	Car	1	2	3	4	5	6	7	8	9	10	11	12	13	14	15	16	17	18	19	20	21	22	DC	Points
2016	TeamWork Motorsport	Volkswagen Golf GTI TCR	BHR; 1	BHR; 2	POR; 1	POR; 2	BEL; 1	BEL; 2	ITA; 1	ITA; 2	AUT; 1	AUT; 2	GER; 1	GER; 2	RUS; 1	RUS; 2	THA; 1	THA; 2	SIN; 1	SIN; 2	MYS; 1; 17	MYS; 2; 19	MAC; 1 DNQ	MAC; 2 DNQ	NC	0
