= 2016 TCR Asia Series =

Car racing competition

Seasons
- ← 2015 2017 →

The 2016 TCR Asia Series season is the second season of the TCR Asia Series.

== Teams and drivers ==
Michelin is the official tyre supplier, but Neric Wei and Edgar Lau used Yokohama tyres at Macau.

Team	Car	No.	Drivers	Rounds
(Malaysia) Viper Niza Racing	SEAT León Cup Racer	1	(South Korea) Roelof Bruins	1
(Malaysia) Viper Niza Racing	SEAT León TCR	65	(Malaysia) Douglas Khoo	All
(Germany) Liqui Moly Team Engstler	Volkswagen Golf GTI TCR	3	(Hong Kong) Andy Yan	All
(Germany) Liqui Moly Team Engstler	Volkswagen Golf GTI TCR	26	(Macau) Filipe de Souza	1–4
(China) Teamwork Motorsport	Volkswagen Golf GTI TCR	7	(United States) Bill O'Brien	All
(China) Teamwork Motorsport	Volkswagen Golf GTI TCR	8	(Macau) Kevin Tse	All
Team Thailand	Honda Civic TCR	9	(Thailand) Tin Sritrai	All
(Thailand) Vattana Motorsport	Honda Civic TCR	13	(Thailand) Narasak Ittiritpong	2
(Thailand) Vattana Motorsport	SEAT León Cup Racer	44	(Thailand) Jack Lemvard	2
(Macau) Son Veng Racing Team	Volkswagen Golf GTI TCR	14	(China) Neric Wei	3, 5
(Hong Kong) Roadstar Racing	SEAT León Cup Racer	17	(Hong Kong) Terence Tse	1–3, 5
(Hong Kong) Roadstar Racing	SEAT León Cup Racer	22	(Hong Kong) Yu Kam Cheong	1
(Hong Kong) Roadstar Racing	SEAT León Cup Racer	78	(Hong Kong) Kenneth Ma	2
(Hong Kong) FRD Racing Team	Ford Focus TCR	71	(Hong Kong) Kenneth Ma	3
(China) Champ Motorsport	Honda Civic TCR	38	(Macau) Michael Ho	1, 3, 5
(China) Champ Motorsport	Honda Civic TCR	88	(Macau) Henry Ho	1–3
(Thailand) TBN MK Ihere Racing Team	Honda Civic TCR	66	(Thailand) Nattachak Hanjitkasen	2
(Thailand) Sloth Racing	SEAT León Cup Racer	97	(Thailand) Paritat Bulbon	2
Entries ineligible to score points
(Hong Kong) Roadstar Racing	SEAT León Cup Racer	64	(China) Neric Wei	5
(Hong Kong) FRD Racing Team	Ford Focus TCR	78	(Hong Kong) Kenneth Ma	5
(Macau) Asia Racing Team	SEAT León TCR	97	(Hong Kong) Edgar Lau	5

== Calendar and results ==
The 2016 schedule was announced on 14 December 2015, with six events scheduled. Later, the round in Sepang (7 August) was canceled and a round in Shanghai was added.

Rnd.		Circuit	Date	Pole position	Fastest lap	Winning driver	Winning team	Supporting
1	1	(South Korea) Korea International Circuit, Yeongam	15 May	(Thailand) Tin Sritrai	(Thailand) Tin Sritrai	(South Korea) Roelof Bruins	(Malaysia) Viper Niza Racing	GT Asia Series
1	2	(South Korea) Korea International Circuit, Yeongam	15 May		(Hong Kong) Andy Yan	(Thailand) Tin Sritrai	Team Thailand	GT Asia Series
2	3	(Thailand) Chang International Circuit, Buriram	12 June	(Hong Kong) Andy Yan	(Hong Kong) Andy Yan	(Hong Kong) Andy Yan	(Germany) Liqui Moly Team Engstler	GT Asia Series
2	4	(Thailand) Chang International Circuit, Buriram	12 June		(Hong Kong) Andy Yan	(Hong Kong) Andy Yan	(Germany) Liqui Moly Team Engstler	GT Asia Series
3	5	(China) Shanghai International Circuit, Shanghai	21 August	(Thailand) Tin Sritrai	(Thailand) Tin Sritrai	(Hong Kong) Andy Yan	(Germany) Liqui Moly Team Engstler	GT Asia Series
3	6	(China) Shanghai International Circuit, Shanghai	21 August		(Hong Kong) Andy Yan	(Hong Kong) Andy Yan	(Germany) Liqui Moly Team Engstler	GT Asia Series
4	7	(Malaysia) Sepang International Circuit, Kuala Lumpur	1 October	(Thailand) Tin Sritrai	(Macau) Kevin Tse	(Macau) Kevin Tse	(China) Teamwork Motorsport	Malaysian Grand Prix; TCR International Series
4	8	(Malaysia) Sepang International Circuit, Kuala Lumpur	2 October		(Thailand) Tin Sritrai	(Hong Kong) Andy Yan	(Germany) Liqui Moly Team Engstler	Malaysian Grand Prix; TCR International Series
5	9	Guia Circuit, Macau	20 November	(Hong Kong) Andy Yan	(Hong Kong) Edgar Lau	(Thailand) Tin Sritrai	Team Thailand	Macau Grand Prix; FIA GT World Cup; Guia Race of Macau
5	10	Guia Circuit, Macau	20 November		(Hong Kong) Andy Yan	(Hong Kong) Andy Yan	(Germany) Liqui Moly Team Engstler	Macau Grand Prix; FIA GT World Cup; Guia Race of Macau

== Championship standings ==
=== Drivers' championship ===
Pos.	Driver	KOR (South Korea)		BUR (Thailand)		SHA (China)		SEP (Malaysia)		MAC† (Macau)		Pts.
Pos.	Driver	RD1	RD2	RD1	RD2	RD1	RD2	RD1	RD2	RD1	RD2	Pts.
1	(Hong Kong) Andy Yan	2^{3}	2	**1**^{1}	1	1^{2}	1	2^{2}	1	3^{1}	1	220
2	(Macau) Kevin Tse	6^{2}	4	7^{2}	2	4^{5}	2	1^{3}	2	2	Ret	138
3	(Thailand) Tin Sritrai	**4**^{1}	1	Ret	Ret	**2**^{1}	Ret	**Ret**^{1}	3	**1**^{2}	2	111
3	(Macau) Filipe de Souza	7	5	5^{5}	4	5	3	3^{4}	4			93
5	(Macau) Henry Ho	3^{4}	6	4	3	3^{3}	Ret					70
6	(South Korea) Roelof Bruins	1^{5}	3									41
7	(Malaysia) Douglas Khoo	11	9	8	**8**	9	Ret	4	5	DNQ	DNQ	34
8	(United States) Bill O'Brien	10	11	11	10	8	6	5^{5}	6	DNQ	DNQ	33
9	(Thailand) Jack Lemvard			2^{3}	5							31
10	(Hong Kong) Terence Tse	8	**8**	9	9	7	5			DNQ	DNQ	28
11	(China) Neric Wei					6	4					20
12	(Macau) Michael Ho	5	7			EX^{4}	Ret			WD	WD	18
13	(Thailand) Narasak Ittiritpong			3^{4}	Ret							17
14	(Thailand) Nattachak Hanjitkasen			6	6							16
15	(Thailand) Paritat Bulbon			10	7							7
16	(Hong Kong) Yu Kam Cheong	9	10									3
16	(Hong Kong) Kenneth Ma			Ret	11	DNS	DNS			DNQ	DNQ	0
Drivers ineligible to score points
	(Hong Kong) Edgar Lau									9	13	
	(China) Neric Wei									12	16	
Pos.	Driver	KOR (South Korea)		BUR (Thailand)		SHA (China)		SEP (Malaysia)		MAC† (Macau)		Pts.

Colour	Result
Gold	Winner
Silver	Second place
Bronze	Third place
Green	Points classification
Blue	Non-points classification
Blue	Non-classified finish (NC)
Purple	Retired, not classified (Ret)
Red	Did not qualify (DNQ)
Red	Did not pre-qualify (DNPQ)
Black	Disqualified (DSQ)
White	Did not start (DNS)
White	Withdrew (WD)
White	Race cancelled (C)
Blank	Did not practice (DNP)
Blank	Did not arrive (DNA)
Blank	Excluded (EX)

**Bold** – Pole
Italics – Fastest Lap

† – Drivers did not finish the race, but were classified as they completed over 75% of the race distance.

=== Teams' Championship ===
Pos.	Team	KOR (South Korea)		BUR (Thailand)		SHA (China)		SEP (Malaysia)		MAC† (Macau)		Pts.
Pos.	Team	RD1	RD2	RD1	RD2	RD1	RD2	RD1	RD2	RD1	RD2	Pts.
1	(Germany) Liqui Moly Team Engstler	2^{3}	2	1^{1}	1	1^{2}	1	2^{2}	1	3^{1}	1	313
1	(Germany) Liqui Moly Team Engstler	7	5	5^{5}	4	5	3	3^{4}	4			313
2	(China) Teamwork Motorsport	6^{2}	4	7^{2}	2	4^{5}	2	1^{3}	2	2	Ret	171
2	(China) Teamwork Motorsport	10	11	11	10	8	6	5^{5}	6	DNQ	DNQ	171
3	Team Thailand	4^{1}	1	Ret	Ret	2^{1}	Ret	Ret^{1}	3	**1**^{2}	2	111
4	(China) Champ Motorsport	3^{4}	6	4	3	3^{3}	Ret					88
4	(China) Champ Motorsport	5	7			EX^{4}	Ret					88
5	(Malaysia) Viper Niza Racing	1^{5}	3	8	8	9	Ret	4	5	DNQ	DNQ	75
5	(Malaysia) Viper Niza Racing	11	9									75
6	(Thailand) Vattana Motorsport			2^{3}	5							48
6	(Thailand) Vattana Motorsport			3^{4}	Ret							48
7	(Hong Kong) Roadstar Racing	8	8	9	9	7	5			DNQ	DNQ	31
7	(Hong Kong) Roadstar Racing	9	10	Ret	11							31
8	(Macau) Son Veng Racing Team					6	4					20
9	(Thailand) TBN MK Ihere Racing Team			6	6							16
10	(Thailand) Sloth Racing			10	7							7
10	(Hong Kong) FRD Racing Team					DNS	DNS			DNQ	DNQ	0
Drivers ineligible to score points
	(Macau) Asia Racing Team									9	13	
	(Macau) Son Veng Racing Team									12	16	
Pos.	Team	KOR (South Korea)		BUR (Thailand)		SHA (China)		SEP (Malaysia)		MAC† (Macau)		Pts.

Colour	Result
Gold	Winner
Silver	Second place
Bronze	Third place
Green	Points classification
Blue	Non-points classification
Blue	Non-classified finish (NC)
Purple	Retired, not classified (Ret)
Red	Did not qualify (DNQ)
Red	Did not pre-qualify (DNPQ)
Black	Disqualified (DSQ)
White	Did not start (DNS)
White	Withdrew (WD)
White	Race cancelled (C)
Blank	Did not practice (DNP)
Blank	Did not arrive (DNA)
Blank	Excluded (EX)

**Bold** – Pole
Italics – Fastest Lap

† – Drivers did not finish the race, but were classified as they completed over 75% of the race distance.
