= Paritat Bulbon =

Thai racing driver

- Nationality: Thai
- Born: 28 October 1970 Bangkok, Thailand
- Died: 13 July 2017 (aged 46) Bangkok, Thailand

TCR International Series career
- Debut season: 2016
- Current team: Sloth Racing
- Car number: 97
- Starts: 0

Previous series
- 2016 2016 2010, 14: TCR Thailand Series; TCR Asia Series; Thailand Super Series

Paritat Bulbon (28 October 1970 – 13 July 2017) was a Thai racing driver who competed in the TCR Thailand Touring Car Championship. Having previously competed in the Thailand Super Series, TCR International Series and TCR Asia Series.

== Death ==
On 13 July 2017, Bulbon committed suicide by shooting himself in his Bangkok home.

== Racing career ==
Bulbon began his career in 2010 in the Thailand Super Series, he finished fourteenth in the S2000 class standings that year and eighth in 2014. For 2016, he switched to the all new 2016 TCR Thailand Touring Car Championship, where he also took part in the 2016 TCR Asia Series round held in Thailand.

In August 2016, it was announced that Bulbon would race in the TCR International Series, driving a SEAT León Cup Racer for his own Sloth Racing team.

== Racing record ==
=== Complete TCR International Series results ===
(key) (Races in bold indicate pole position) (Races in italics indicate fastest lap)

Year	Team	Car	1	2	3	4	5	6	7	8	9	10	11	12	13	14	15	16	17	18	19	20	21	22	DC	Points
2016	Sloth Racing	SEAT León Cup Racer	BHR; 1	BHR; 2	POR; 1	POR; 2	BEL; 1	BEL; 2	ITA; 1	ITA; 2	AUT; 1	AUT; 2	GER; 1	GER; 2	RUS; 1	RUS; 2	THA; 1; 18	THA; 2; 16	SIN; 1	SIN; 2	MYS; 1	MYS; 2	MAC; 1	MAC; 2	NC	0
