= Narasak Ittiritpong =

Thai racing driver (born 1983)

- Nationality: Thai
- Born: 30 July 1983 (age 43) Rayong, Thailand

TCR International Series career
- Debut season: 2016
- Current team: Vattana Motorsport
- Car number: 13
- Starts: 2

Previous series
- 2016 2015 2010, 13-14, 16 2008-11 2000-01 1998-99 1997-99, 03-04, 07: TCR Thailand Series; Thai Honda Jazz Super Cup; Thailand Super Series; Thai Honda Civic Racing Festival; Thai GT Championship; Thai Rallycross Championship; Thai Rally Championship

Championship titles
- 2008-10 1998-99 1998, 04, 07: Thai Honda Civic Racing Festival; Thai Rallycross Championship; Thai Rally Championship

Narasak Ittiritpong (born 30 July 1983) is a Thai racing driver currently competing in the TCR International Series and TCR Thailand Touring Car Championship. Having previously competed in the Thailand Super Series, Thai Rally Championship and Thai Honda Civic Racing Festival amongst others.

== Racing career ==
Ittiritpong began his career in 1997 in the Thai Rally Championship, he raced there until 1999, winning the title in 1998. He also raced in the Thai Rallycross Championship in this period and won the title in 1998 and 1999. In 2000, he made his circuit racing debut in the Thai GT Championship, finishing second in the championship standing in 2000 and 2001. He returned to rallying in 2003, again choosing the Thai Rally Championship, finishing second in the standings that year and winning the title the next year. After a two-year hiatus, he returned to rallying in 2007, going on to win the title that year. In 2008, he returned to circuit racing in the Thai Honda Civic Racing Festival, winning the Class B title that year, continuing in the series the three following years, he won the Class A title all three times. He also raced in the Thailand Super Series in 2010, finishing second in the S2000 class, he had a couple further appearances in the series in 2013 and 2014. Before returning full-time in 2016 in the GTC class, where he currently leads the standings. In 2015, he raced in the Thai Honda Jazz Super Cup. For 2016, he switched to the all new 2016 TCR Thailand Touring Car Championship, where he also took part in the 2016 TCR Asia Series round held in Thailand.

In August 2016, it was announced that Ittiritpong would race in the TCR International Series, driving a Honda Civic TCR for Vattana Motorsport.

== Racing record ==
=== Complete TCR International Series results ===
(key) (Races in bold indicate pole position) (Races in italics indicate fastest lap)

| Year | Team | Car | 1 | 2 | 3 | 4 | 5 | 6 | 7 | 8 | 9 | 10 | 11 | 12 | 13 | 14 | 15 | 16 | 17 | 18 | 19 | 20 | 21 | 22 | DC | Points |
|---|---|---|---|---|---|---|---|---|---|---|---|---|---|---|---|---|---|---|---|---|---|---|---|---|---|---|
| 2016 | Vattana Motorsport | Honda Civic TCR | BHR; 1 | BHR; 2 | POR; 1 | POR; 2 | BEL; 1 | BEL; 2 | ITA; 1 | ITA; 2 | AUT; 1 | AUT; 2 | GER; 1 | GER; 2 | RUS; 1 | RUS; 2 | THA; 1; 11 | THA; 2 Ret | SIN; 1 | SIN; 2 | MYS; 1 | MYS; 2 | MAC; 1 | MAC; 2 | NC | 0 |
