= Jack Lemvard =

Thai racing driver (born 1984)

- Nationality: Thai / Danish
- Born: 14 September 1984 (age 42) Pattaya, Thailand

Thailand Super Series (TSS) career
- Debut season: 2022
- Current team: Aurora Ford Thailand Racing
- Car number: 41
- Starts: 120
- Wins: 47
- Fastest laps: 46

Previous series
- 2016 2016 2015 2012 2008-11, 14-15 2008 2008 2007 2007 2007-11 2006 1998, 03-06: GTC Thailand Championship; TCR Asia Series; Thai Honda Jazz Super Cup; Thai Lotus Cup; Thailand Super Series; ADAC Procar Series; Asian Touring Car Series; Formula BMW Asia; Benelux Formula Ford; Thai Honda Pro Cup; Thai Toyota Vios Cup; Karting

Championship titles
- 2015 2012 2010 2009, 11 2008 2007-11 2006 1998, 06: Thai Honda Jazz Super Cup; Thai Lotus Cup; Thailand Super Series - N/A Class; Thailand Super Series - S2000; Asian Touring Car Series; Thai Honda Pro Cup; Thai Toyota Vios Cup; Karting

Jack Lemvard (born 14 September 1984) is a Thai racing driver currently competing in the Thailand Super Series (TSS) Pickup category. Having previously competed in the Asian Touring Car Series and Formula BMW Asia amongst others.

== Racing Career ==
Lemvard is regarded as one of the most talented drivers currently active in Thailand. He started racing karts at the age of 13, winning a club championship in his first year. After a successful karting career, he graduated to cars and single seaters, competing all over the world and winning a total of 23 championships.

In 2007, Lemvard went on to compete in Formula BMW Asia (now F4 equivalent) with team Meritus and won his first race with the team. In the same year, he reached the Formula BMW World Finals in Valencia finishing 17th, highest of all drivers from Asia.

In 2008, feeling that his height was a disadvantage in single seater cars, Lemvard switched focus to touring cars. Stand out moments included wins and fastest laps in the German ADAC Procar Championship in a BMW E46 for Liqui Moly Team Engstler. Including one race starting 34th and finishing on the podium. Despite only competing in half in the season, he finished fourth overall. In the same year, Lemvard also won the Asian Touring Car Series driving a BMW 320si also for Team Engstler.

At the annual touring car support race (CTM Cup) held the prestigious Macau Grand Prix, Lemvard started 37th due to issues in qualifying and within six laps worked his way up to fourth place. Unfortunately, due to the top-three crashing out on the narrow track, this left Lemvard nowhere to go and his race ended there. This would have been the first drive from last to first at the Guia Street Circuit.

From 2008 until 2016, Lemvard managed to win almost every championship entered including 16 National Championships mostly with Thailand based Vattana Motorsport from 2010. Championships included the Honda Pro Cup, Super 2000, Honda Jazz Super Cup, Honda Civic One Make Race (OMR) and Lotus Cup. In 2011, he also won the RAAT Endurance Championship, along with four other championships in the same year.

In 2018, Lemvard got the opportunity to race in GT3 in some seasons with the Porsche 991. During the same year, he got another chance to race in GT3 with the Lamborghini Gallardo for a few rounds at Sepang Circuit obtaining good results despite having to share the seat with a second driver.

The global pandemic forced a period of inactivity until 2022 where Lemvard returned with a full-time drive with Ford Thailand Racing and was the first driver to win the individual Thai Global Touring Championship (GTC) in 2022 and team championship in 2023 with the Ford Mustang.

Since 2022, Lemvard has been racing the Ford Ranger Pickup and achieved a win at the Thailand Super Pickup Series Bangsean Grand Prix in 2023.

In 2024, following new rule changes in the TSS Pickup category, the team fell behind in the running order. This has meant the 2024 and 2025 seasons have been development years to catch up back to the front with the updated Ford V6 engine now ready for 2026.

== Racing record ==
=== Complete TCR International Series results ===
(key) (Races in bold indicate pole position) (Races in italics indicate fastest lap)

Year	Team	Car	1	2	3	4	5	6	7	8	9	10	11	12	13	14	15	16	17	18	19	20	21	22	DC	Points
2016	Vattana Motorsport	SEAT León Cup Racer	BHR; 1	BHR; 2	POR; 1	POR; 2	BEL; 1	BEL; 2	ITA; 1	ITA; 2	AUT; 1	AUT; 2	GER; 1	GER; 2	RUS; 1	RUS; 2	THA; 1 Ret	THA; 2; 17	SIN; 1	SIN; 2	MYS; 1	MYS; 2	MAC; 1	MAC; 2	NC	0
