= Nattachak Hanjitkasen =

Thai racing driver (born 1992)

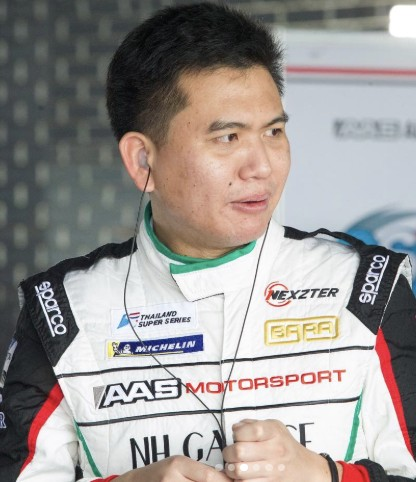
- Nationality: Thai
- Born: 1 June 1992 (age 34) Bangkok, Thailand

TCR International Series career
- Debut season: 2016
- Current team: TBN MK Ihere Racing Team
- Car number: 66
- Starts: 2

Previous series
- 2016 2016 2015: TCR Thailand Series; TCR Asia Series; Thailand Super Series

Nattachak Hanjitkasen (born 1 June 1992) is a Thai racing driver currently competing in the TCR International Series and TCR Thailand Touring Car Championship. He has previously competed in the Thailand Super Series and TCR Asia Series.

== Racing career ==
Hanjitkasen began his career in 2015 in the Thailand Super Series, he finished sixth in the S2000 class standings that year. For 2016, he switched to the all new 2016 TCR Thailand Touring Car Championship, where he also took part in the 2016 TCR Asia Series round held in Thailand.

In August 2016, it was announced that Hanjitkasen would race in the TCR International Series, driving a Honda Civic TCR for TBN MK Ihere Racing Team.

== Racing record ==
=== Complete TCR International Series results ===
(key) (Races in bold indicate pole position) (Races in italics indicate fastest lap)

Year	Team	Car	1	2	3	4	5	6	7	8	9	10	11	12	13	14	15	16	17	18	19	20	21	22	DC	Points
2016	TBN MK Ihere Racing Team	Honda Civic TCR	BHR; 1	BHR; 2	POR; 1	POR; 2	BEL; 1	BEL; 2	ITA; 1	ITA; 2	AUT; 1	AUT; 2	GER; 1	GER; 2	RUS; 1	RUS; 2	THA; 1; 16	THA; 2 Ret	SIN; 1	SIN; 2	MYS; 1	MYS; 2	MAC; 1	MAC; 2	NC	0
2017	TBN MK Ihere Racing Team	Honda Civic Type-R TCR	GEO; 1	GEO; 2	BHR; 1	BHR; 2	BEL; 1	BEL; 2	ITA; 1	ITA; 2	AUT; 1	AUT; 2	HUN; 1	HUN; 2	GER; 1	GER; 2	THA; 1; 18	THA; 2; 20	CHN; 1	CHN; 2	ABU; 1	ABU; 2			NC*	0*

^{†} Driver did not finish the race, but was classified as he completed over 90% of the race distance.
^{*} Season still in progress.
