= Vattana Motorsport =

Thai auto racing team

(Thailand) Vattana Motorsport
- Founded: 2009
- Team principal(s): Chonsawat Asavahame
- Current series: TCR International Series; TCR Thailand Touring Car Championship
- Noted drivers: TCR; TCR Asia; TCR Thailand; 13. (Thailand) Narasak Ittiritpong; 44. (Thailand) Jack Lemvard
- Drivers' Championships: Thailand Super Series Asavahame (2014)
- Website: http://www.vattanaauto.com

Vattana Motorsport is a Thai auto racing team based in Bangkok, Thailand. The team has raced in the TCR International Series, since 2016. Having previously raced in the Thailand Super Series amongst others.

== Thailand Super Series ==
The team made their debut in the 2009 Thailand Super Series, with team owner and racing driver Chonsawat Asavahame. Asavahame finished twelfth in the standings in 2009 and 5th in 2010. They still races in the series today, having several drivers in different categories. Most notably the team has had close cooperation with Reiter Engineering, since 2014, having run both the Reiter Chevrolet Camaro GT3 and KTM X-Bow GT4.

For 2016 the team entered the new TCR Thailand Touring Car Championship, a new category in the Thailand Super Series. The team entered a SEAT León Cup Racer for Jack Lemvard and a Honda Civic TCR for Narasak Ittiritpong. Ittiritpong took pole position in his first appearance in the series, which was the second round of the championship.

== TCR Asia Series ==
After having raced in the TCR Thailand Touring Car Championship for most of 2016, the team entered the Thai round of the 2016 TCR Asia Series, with regular driver Jack Lemvard being joined by Narasak Ittiritpong. Ittiritpong had just taken delivery of his new Honda Civic TCR and had plans to take part in the remaining rounds of the 2016 TCR Thailand Touring Car Championship.

== TCR International Series ==
=== SEAT León Cup Racer & Honda Civic TCR (2016–) ===
After having raced in TCR Asia Series round in Buriram, the team entered the 2016 TCR International Series with TCR Thailand regulars Jack Lemvard driving a SEAT León Cup Racer and Narasak Ittiritpong driving a Honda Civic TCR.
