= Dean MacDonald =

British racing driver

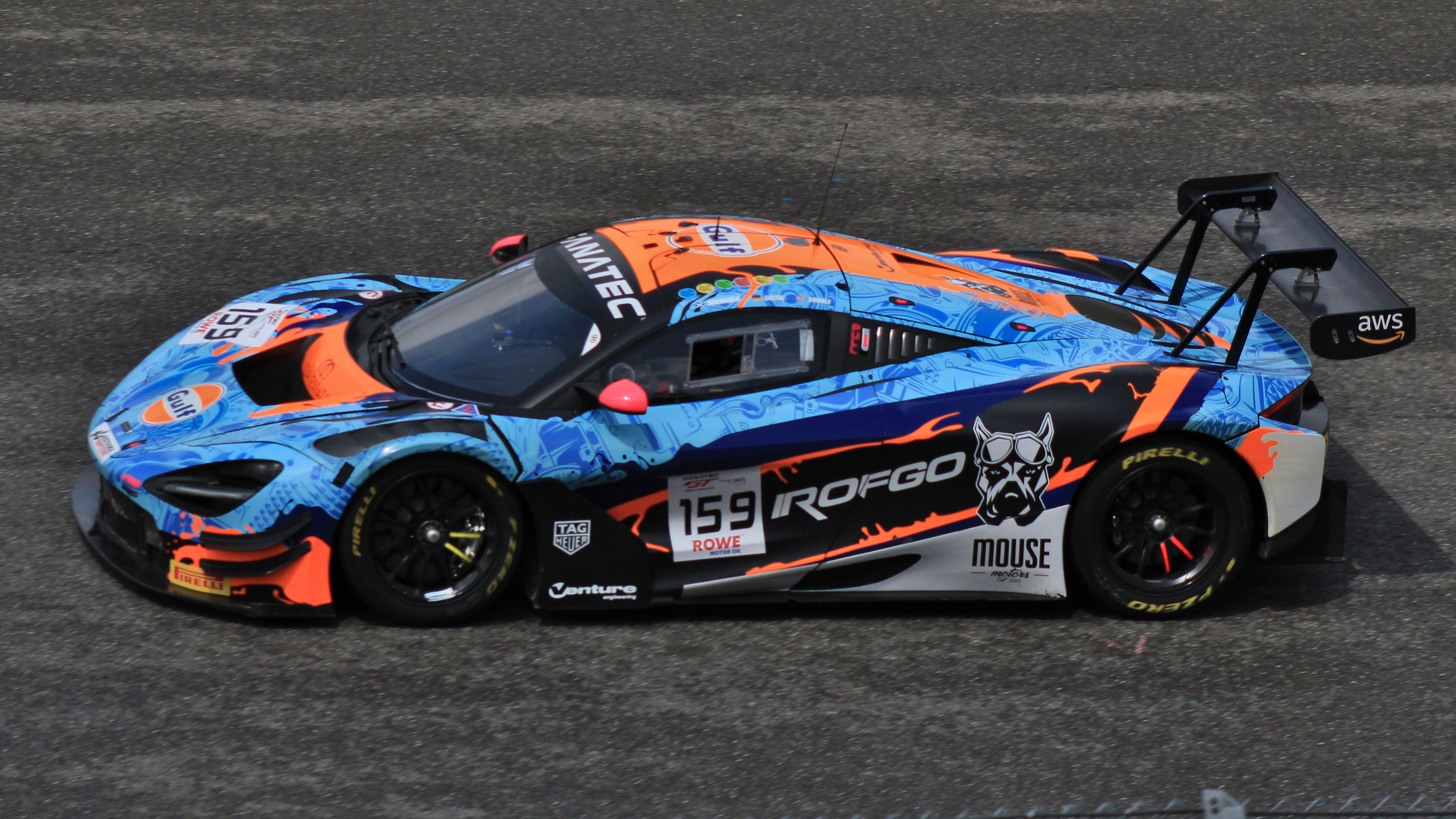
- Nationality: (United Kingdom) British
- Born: 6 December 2000 (age 25) Cowdenbeath, Scotland

GT World Challenge Europe Sprint Cup career
- Debut season: 2022
- Current team: Garage 59
- Categorisation: FIA Silver (until 2022); FIA Gold (2023–)
- Car number: 58
- Former teams: JP Motorsport
- Starts: 20
- Wins: 4
- Podiums: 7
- Poles: 7
- Fastest laps: 3

Championship titles
- 2022: GT World Challenge Europe Sprint Cup – Pro-Am
- Statistics up to date as of 22 October 2023.

Dean MacDonald (born 6 December 2000) is a British racing driver from Scotland who competes for Garage 59 in the GT World Challenge Europe. He is a McLaren factory driver, and was Pro-Am champion of the 2022 GT World Challenge Europe Sprint Cup alongside Miguel Ramos.

== Career ==
=== Early career ===
MacDonald's racing career began at an early age, as he received a go-kart as a gift from his father at just one year of age. It sat in the family kitchen for several years while Dean grew old enough to drive it. At age three, he began testing ahead of a true karting debut at age five in Bambino karts. MacDonald enjoyed a successful karting career, becoming the youngest Comer Cadet winner of the Scottish Championship and later winning the Iame International Final in the X30 Pro class in 2019.

=== GT racing ===
In 2015, MacDonald shifted to sports car racing by joining the McLaren GT Driver Academy. MacDonald had initially aimed to progress towards Formula One, but pursued sports car racing due to the uncertainty of the single-seater ladder. His first full-time drive supported by the program took place in 2017, where he drove in the British GT Championship. Competing in the GT4 class alongside Akhil Rabindra, MacDonald came close to securing podium finishes early in the season, but would ultimately finish 13th in points. In the winter of 2017, MacDonald was a finalist for the Porsche Carrera Cup Great Britain Junior Scholarship shootout, becoming the youngest member of that year's prospective class. MacDonald returned to the British GT Championship for 2018, shifting to Steller Performance and pairing Alex Quinn. However, MacDonald's program with Steller wouldn't last the entire season, as the team were forced to skip the round at Spa after parts delays derailed a planned upgrade to their Toyota GT86-based entry. As a result, MacDonald joined Century Motorsport for the remainder of the season. In his first race with the team, paired alongside eventual champion Jack Mitchell, MacDonald claimed a GT4 class victory – his only victory of the season.

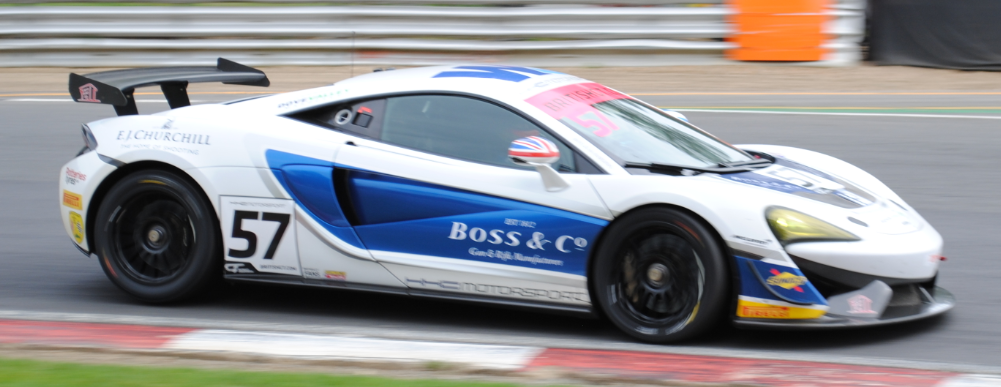
MacDonald's McLaren 570S GT4 at Brands Hatch in 2019.

MacDonald returned to McLaren machinery in 2019, embarking on his third British GT season with HHC Motorsport, paired with Callum Pointon. The duo got off to a fast start, taking a class victory in the first race of the season at Oulton Park. They would claim three additional podiums that season, placing third in the GT4 class championship. 2020 saw MacDonald graduate to GT3 machinery, as he took the wheel of a McLaren 720S GT3 for the first time in his career. Once again in British GT, MacDonald joined Angus Fender in a new-for-2020 effort for 2 Seas Motorsport. The pair claimed a podium in the opening race of the season, and finished tenth in the GT3 championship.

For the first time in his professional racing career, MacDonald ventured outside of the British GT Championship in 2021. Alongside Gus Bowers, MacDonald joined United Autosports' effort in the GT4 European Series, with the two pairing up in the team's No. 32 entry. Bowers and MacDonald scored one victory – at the Nürburgring in September – as United won the teams' title.

==== GT World Challenge Europe ====
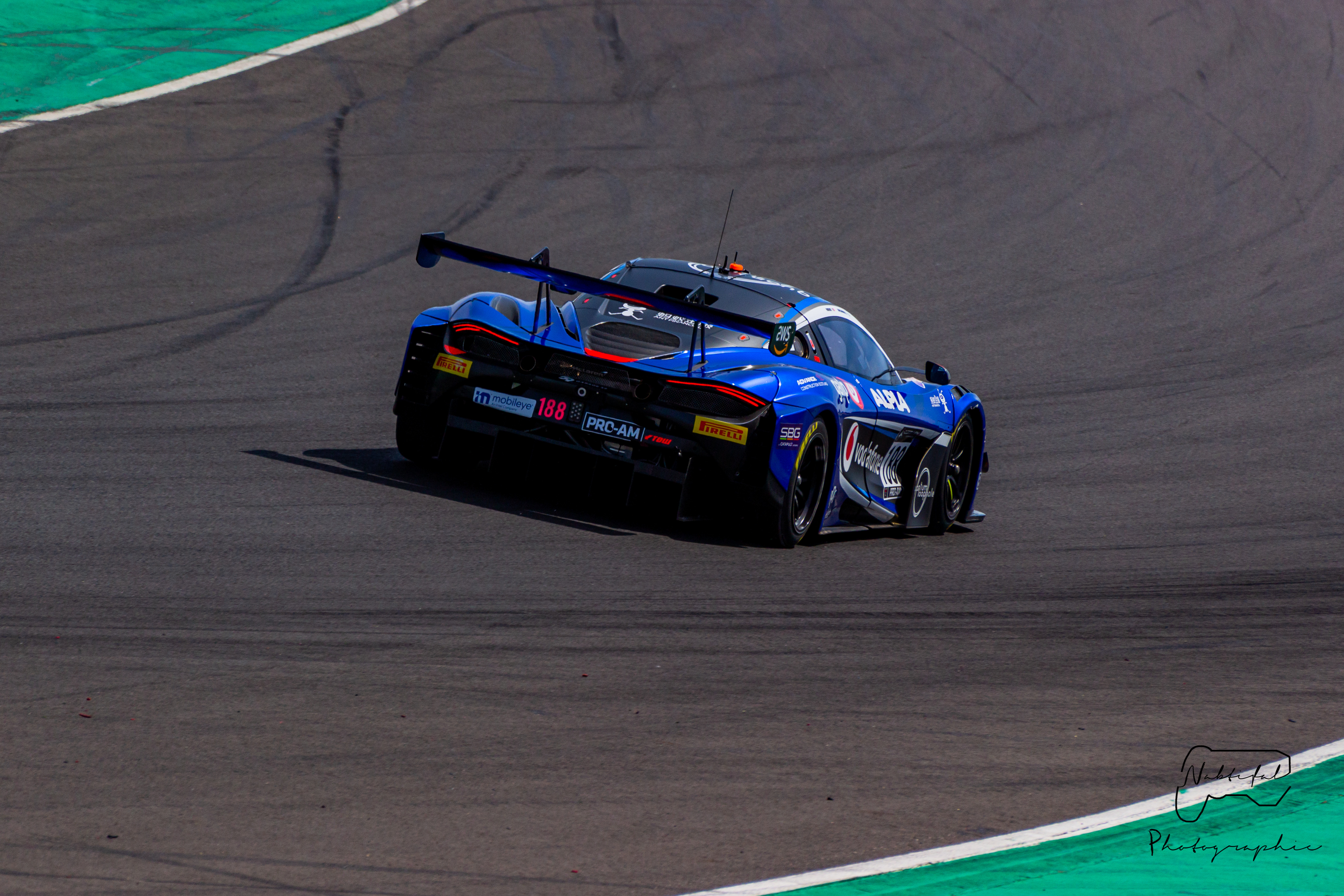
MacDonald's championship-winning McLaren 720S GT3 at Magny-Cours in 2022.

In 2022, MacDonald took on a full season drive in the GT World Challenge Europe Sprint Cup with Garage 59. MacDonald and co-driver Miguel Ramos successfully defended the latter's 2021 Pro-Am title, taking seven class pole positions, seven class podiums, and four class victories. MacDonald added a supposed one-off in the Endurance Cup, serving as the fourth driver in Garage 59's No. 188 entry at the 2022 24 Hours of Spa. MacDonald would later replace Ethan Simioni as the third driver in the #159 for the final two races of the season, helping Nicolai Kjærgaard and Manuel Maldonado to a Silver Cup-class podium finish in the final race of the season.

The following season, MacDonald embarked on a full-season GT World Challenge Europe campaign, albeit with different teams in each series. In the Endurance Cup, MacDonald switched to fellow McLaren competitors Optimum Motorsport, driving alongside Sam De Haan and Charlie Fagg. Competing in the Gold Cup class, the team's season culminated in a class victory at the 2023 24 Hours of Spa as they finished sixth in the Gold Cup championship. In the Sprint Cup, he graduated to the Pro class, joining former F1 driver Christian Klien in JP Motorsport's No. 111 entry. The duo endured a difficult season, finishing as high as 11th on two occasions but failing to score championship points.

== Personal life ==
MacDonald attended Beath High School in Cowdenbeath. Early in his career, he worked for his father's kart and engine-building business Shox Performance. He also played a role in developing an IAME Gazelle engine for karting.

== Racing record ==
=== Career summary ===
Season	Series	Team	Races	Wins	Poles	F/Laps	Podiums	Points	Position
2017	British GT Championship - GT4	Black Bull Garage 59	10	0	0	0	0	45.5	13th
2018	British GT Championship - GT4	Steller Performance	6	0	0	0	0	52.5	12th
2018	British GT Championship - GT4	Century Motorsport	3	1	1	0	1	52.5	12th
2019	British GT Championship - GT4	HHC Motorsport	9	1	1	3	4	112	**3rd**
2020	British GT Championship - GT3	2 Seas Motorsport	9	0	0	0	1	35	10th
2021	GT4 European Series - Silver	United Autosports	12	1	2	1	3	95	5th
2022	GT World Challenge Europe	Garage 59	13	0	0	0	0	0	NC
2022	GT World Challenge Europe - Pro-Am	Garage 59	11	4	7	3	7	149	**3rd**
2022	GT World Challenge Europe - Silver	Garage 59	2	0	1	1	1	25	26th
2022	GT World Challenge Europe Sprint Cup	Garage 59	10	0	0	0	0	0	NC
2022	GT World Challenge Europe Sprint Cup - Pro-Am	Garage 59	10	4	7	3	7	119	**1st**
2022	GT World Challenge Europe Endurance Cup	Garage 59	3	0	0	0	0	0	NC
2022	GT World Challenge Europe Endurance Cup - Silver	Garage 59	2	0	1	1	1	25	13th
2022	GT World Challenge Europe Endurance Cup - Pro-Am	Garage 59	1	0	0	0	0	30	9th
2023	GT World Challenge Europe	JP Motorsport	10	0	0	0	0	7	46th
2023	GT World Challenge Europe	Optimum Motorsport	5	0	0	0	0	7	46th
2023	GT World Challenge Europe - Gold	Optimum Motorsport	5	1	1	1	2	70	12th
2023	GT World Challenge Europe Sprint Cup	JP Motorsport	10	0	0	0	0	0	NC
2023	GT World Challenge Europe Endurance Cup	Optimum Motorsport	5	0	0	0	0	7	21st
2023	GT World Challenge Europe Endurance Cup - Gold	Optimum Motorsport	5	1	1	1	2	70	6th
2024	GT World Challenge Europe Endurance Cup	Garage 59	5	0	0	0	0	2	30th
2024	International GT Open	Greystone GT	5	1	0	0	2	45	12th
2025	GT World Challenge Europe Endurance Cup	Garage 59	5	1	1	1	1	26	12th
2025	GT World Challenge Europe Endurance Cup - Gold	Garage 59	5	1	4	1	2	58	4th
2025	International GT Open	Greystone GT	14	2	1	1	5	97	6th
2026	IMSA SportsCar Championship - GTD Pro	RLL Team McLaren	2	0	0	0	0	470	30th
2026	GT World Challenge Europe Endurance Cup	Garage 59	5	0	0	1	0	21	12th
2026	GT World Challenge Europe Sprint Cup	Garage 59	10	0	0	0	0	26.5	11th
2026	International GT Open	Greystone GT	12	2	3	2	11	142	**3rd**
2026	Italian GT Championship Sprint Cup - GT3	Raptor Engineering	8	2	2	0	4	70	**3rd**
2026	British GT Championship - GT3	Orange Racing by JMH	2	0	0	0	0	0	NC

=== Complete British GT Championship results ===
(key) (Races in bold indicate pole position) (Races in italics indicate fastest lap)

Year	Team	Car	Class	1	2	3	4	5	6	7	8	9	10	DC	Points
2017	Black Bull Garage 59	McLaren 570S GT4	GT4	OUL; 1; 22	OUL; 2; 12	ROC; 1; 14	SNE; 1; 18	SNE; 2; 16	SIL; 1; 21	SPA; 1 Ret	SPA; 2; 24	BRH; 1; 21	DON; 1 Ret	13th	45.5
2018	Steller Performance	Toyota GT86 GT4	GT4	OUL; 1; 27	OUL; 2; 29	ROC; 1; 24	SNE; 1 Ret	SNE; 2 Ret	SIL; 1 Ret					12th	52.5
2018	Century Motorsport	BMW M4 GT4	GT4							SPA; 1; 11	**BRH**; **1**; 14	DON; 1; 20		12th	52.5
2019	HHC Motorsport	McLaren 570S GT4	GT4	OUL; 1; 12	OUL; 2; 24	SNE; 1; 15	SNE; 2; 16	SIL; 1; 21	DON; 1; 16	SPA; 1 Ret	**BRH**; **1**; 14	DON; 2; 20		3rd	112
2020	2 Seas Motorsport	McLaren 720S GT3	GT3	OUL; 1; 3	OUL; 2 Ret	DON; 1 Ret	DON; 2; 21	BRH; 1; 11	DON; 3; 13	SNE; 1; 11	SNE; 2; 9	SIL; 1; 5		10th	35
2026	Orange Racing by JMH	McLaren 720S GT3 Evo	GT3	SIL; 1	OUL; 1	OUL; 2	SPA; 1	SNE; 1; 22	SNE; 2; 11	DON; 1	BRH; 1			NC	0

=== Complete GT World Challenge Europe results ===
==== GT World Challenge Europe Endurance Cup ====
(key) (Races in bold indicate pole position) (Races in italics indicate fastest lap)

Year	Team	Car	Class	1	2	3	4	5	6	7	Pos.	Points
2022	Garage 59	McLaren 720S GT3	Pro-Am	IMO	LEC	SPA; 6H; 29	SPA; 12H; 24	SPA; 24H; 41†			9th	30
2022	Garage 59	McLaren 720S GT3	Silver						HOC; 18	**CAT**; 12	13th	25
2023	Optimum Motorsport	McLaren 720S GT3	Gold	**MNZ**; 11	LEC; Ret	SPA; 6H; 31	SPA; 12H; 4	**SPA**; **24H**; 10	NÜR; 46	CAT; Ret	6th	70
2024	Garage 59	McLaren 720S GT3 Evo	Pro	LEC; Ret	SPA; 6H; 35	SPA; 12H; 29	SPA; 24H; 11	NÜR; 14	MNZ; 14	JED; 9	30th	2
2025	Garage 59	McLaren 720S GT3 Evo	Gold	**LEC**; Ret	**MNZ**; Ret	SPA; 6H; 28	SPA; 12H; 15	SPA; 24H; 12	**NÜR**; Ret	**CAT**; 1	4th	58
2026	Garage 59	McLaren 720S GT3 Evo	Pro	LEC; 5	MNZ; Ret	SPA; 6H; 13	SPA; 12H; Ret	SPA; 24H; Ret	NÜR; 10	ALG; 6	12th	21

^{*} Season still in progress.

==== GT World Challenge Europe Sprint Cup ====
(key) (Races in bold indicate pole position) (Races in italics indicate fastest lap)

Year	Team	Car	Class	1	2	3	4	5	6	7	8	9	10	Pos.	Points
2022	Garage 59	McLaren 720S GT3	Pro-Am	BRH; 1; 19	BRH; 2; 22	**MAG**; **1**; 18	**MAG**; **2**; 21	**ZAN**; **1** Ret	**ZAN**; **2**; 15	**MIS**; **1**; 17	**MIS**; **2**; 15	VAL; 1; 20	**VAL**; **2**; 21	1st	119
2023	JP Motorsport	McLaren 720S GT3	Pro	BRH; 1; 21	BRH; 2; 11	MIS; 1 Ret	MIS; 2; 37	HOC; 1; 30	HOC; 2 Ret	VAL; 1; 13	VAL; 2; 11	ZAN; 1; 23	ZAN; 2; 18	NC	0
2026	Garage 59	McLaren 720S GT3 Evo	Pro	BRH; 1; 11	BRH; 2; 5	MIS; 1; 13	MIS; 2; 7	MAG; 1; 5	MAG; 2; 7	ZAN; 1; 20	ZAN; 2; 13	CAT; 1; 4	CAT; 2; 9	11th	26.5

^{*} Season still in progress.

=== Complete International GT Open results ===
(key) (Races in bold indicate pole position) (Races in italics indicate fastest lap)

Year	Team	Car	Class	1	2	3	4	5	6	7	8	9	10	11	12	13	14	Pos.	Points
2024	Greystone GT	McLaren 720S GT3 Evo	Pro	ALG; 1	ALG; 2	HOC; 1	HOC; 2	SPA	HUN; 1	HUN; 2	LEC; 1	LEC; 2	RBR; 1; 6	RBR; 2; 3	CAT; 1; 29†	CAT; 2 Ret	MNZ; 1	12th	45
2025	Greystone GT	McLaren 720S GT3 Evo	Pro	ALG; 1; 1	ALG; 2; 6	**SPA**; Ret	HOC; 1 Ret	HOC; 2; 9	HUN; 1; 3	HUN; 2; 5	LEC; 1; 4	LEC; 2; 3	RBR; 1; 17	RBR; 2; 1	CAT; 1; 9	CAT; 2; 2	MNZ; 5	6th	97
2026	Greystone GT	McLaren 720S GT3 Evo	Pro	ALG; 1; 3	**ALG**; **2**; 1	SPA; 13	**MIS**; **1**; 2	MIS; 2; 2	HUN; 1; 3	HUN; 2; 2	LEC; 1	LEC; 2	HOC; 1; 2	HOC; 2; 3	MNZ; 2	CAT; 1; 3	**CAT**; **2**; 1	3rd	142

=== Complete IMSA SportsCar Championship results ===
(key) (Races in bold indicate pole position; races in italics indicate fastest lap)

Year	Entrant	Class	Chassis	Engine	1	2	3	4	5	6	7	8	9	10	Rank	Points
2026	RLL Team McLaren	GTD Pro	McLaren 720S GT3 Evo	McLaren M840T 4.0 L Turbo V8	DAY; 12	SEB; 9	LGA	DET	WGL	MOS	ELK	VIR	IMS	PET	30th	470

^{*} Season still in progress.

Sporting positions
Preceded by Henrique Chaves; Miguel Ramos	GT World Challenge Europe Sprint Cup; Pro-Am Champion; 2022; With: Miguel Ramos	Succeeded by Class Folded
