= 2022 GT World Challenge Europe Sprint Cup =

Sports car racing series

The 2022 Fanatec GT World Challenge Europe Sprint Cup was the tenth season of the GT World Challenge Europe Sprint Cup following on from the demise of the SRO Motorsports Group's FIA GT1 World Championship (an auto racing series for grand tourer cars), the second with the sponsorship of Fanatec.

The season began on 30 April at Brands Hatch in Kent and ended on 18 September at Circuit Ricardo Tormo in Spain.

== Calendar ==
Round	Circuit	Date
1	(United Kingdom) Brands Hatch, Kent	30 April–1 May
2	(France) Circuit de Nevers Magny-Cours, Magny-Cours	13–15 May
3	(Netherlands) Circuit Zandvoort, Zandvoort	17–19 June
4	(Italy) Misano World Circuit Marco Simoncelli, Misano Adriatico	1–3 July
5	(Spain) Circuit Ricardo Tormo, Cheste	16–18 September

== Entry list ==
Team	Car	No.	Drivers	Class	Rounds
(Italy) Tresor by Car Collection	Audi R8 LMS Evo II	11	(France) Simon Gachet	P	All
(Italy) Tresor by Car Collection	Audi R8 LMS Evo II	11	(Germany) Christopher Haase	P	All
(Italy) Tresor by Car Collection	Audi R8 LMS Evo II	12	(San Marino) Mattia Drudi (Note: Drudi is an Italian driver competing under a Sammarinese licence.)	P	All
(Italy) Tresor by Car Collection	Audi R8 LMS Evo II	12	(Italy) Luca Ghiotto	P	1–3, 5
(Italy) Tresor by Car Collection	Audi R8 LMS Evo II	12	(Italy) Lorenzo Patrese	P	4
(Monaco) GSM Novamarine	Lamborghini Huracán GT3 Evo	18	(Spain) Isaac Tutumlu	S	1–2
(Monaco) GSM Novamarine	Lamborghini Huracán GT3 Evo	18	(Austria) Gerhard Tweraser	S	1–2
(Monaco) GSM Novamarine	Lamborghini Huracán GT3 Evo	18	(Netherlands) Danny Kroes	S	3–5
(Monaco) GSM Novamarine	Lamborghini Huracán GT3 Evo	18	(Switzerland) Lucas Mauron	S	3
(Monaco) GSM Novamarine	Lamborghini Huracán GT3 Evo	18	(Netherlands) Daan Pijl	S	4
(Monaco) GSM Novamarine	Lamborghini Huracán GT3 Evo	18	(Netherlands) Joshua John Kreuger	S	5
(Italy) AF Corse	Ferrari 488 GT3 Evo 2020	21	(Monaco) Cédric Sbirrazzuoli	PA	All
(Italy) AF Corse	Ferrari 488 GT3 Evo 2020	21	(France) Hugo Delacour	PA	1–2, 4–5
(Italy) AF Corse	Ferrari 488 GT3 Evo 2020	21	(Italy) Stefano Costantini	PA	3
(Italy) AF Corse	Ferrari 488 GT3 Evo 2020	52	(Italy) Andrea Bertolini	PA	All
(Italy) AF Corse	Ferrari 488 GT3 Evo 2020	52	(Belgium) Louis Machiels	PA	All
(Italy) AF Corse	Ferrari 488 GT3 Evo 2020	53	(France) Pierre-Alexandre Jean	S	All
(Italy) AF Corse	Ferrari 488 GT3 Evo 2020	53	(Belgium) Ulysse de Pauw	S	All
(France) Saintéloc Junior Team	Audi R8 LMS Evo II	25	(Switzerland) Patric Niederhauser	P	All
(France) Saintéloc Junior Team	Audi R8 LMS Evo II	25	(France) Aurélien Panis	P	All
(France) Saintéloc Junior Team	Audi R8 LMS Evo II	26	(Belgium) Nicolas Baert	S	All
(France) Saintéloc Junior Team	Audi R8 LMS Evo II	26	(Belgium) Gilles Magnus	S	1–3, 5
(France) Saintéloc Junior Team	Audi R8 LMS Evo II	26	(Switzerland) Lucas Légeret	S	4
(Belgium) Team WRT	Audi R8 LMS Evo II	30	(Denmark) Benjamin Goethe	S	All
(Belgium) Team WRT	Audi R8 LMS Evo II	30	(France) Thomas Neubauer	S	All
(Belgium) Team WRT	Audi R8 LMS Evo II	32	(Belgium) Dries Vanthoor	P	All
(Belgium) Team WRT	Audi R8 LMS Evo II	32	(Belgium) Charles Weerts	P	All
(Belgium) Team WRT	Audi R8 LMS Evo II	33	(Germany) Christopher Mies	P	All
(Belgium) Team WRT	Audi R8 LMS Evo II	33	(France) Jean-Baptiste Simmenauer	P	All
(Belgium) Team WRT	Audi R8 LMS Evo II	46	(Italy) Valentino Rossi	P	All
(Belgium) Team WRT	Audi R8 LMS Evo II	46	(Belgium) Frédéric Vervisch	P	All
(United Kingdom) Jota Sport	McLaren 720S GT3	38	(United Kingdom) Rob Bell	P	1
(United Kingdom) Jota Sport	McLaren 720S GT3	38	(United Kingdom) Oliver Wilkinson	P	1
(Italy) Dinamic Motorsport	Porsche 911 GT3 R	54	(Belgium) Adrien de Leener	P	All
(Italy) Dinamic Motorsport	Porsche 911 GT3 R	54	(Germany) Christian Engelhart	P	All
(Italy) Dinamic Motorsport	Porsche 911 GT3 R	56	(Austria) Klaus Bachler	P	All
(Italy) Dinamic Motorsport	Porsche 911 GT3 R	56	(Italy) Giorgio Roda	P	All
(Germany) Attempto Racing	Audi R8 LMS Evo II	66	(Germany) Dennis Marschall	P	All
(Germany) Attempto Racing	Audi R8 LMS Evo II	66	(Netherlands) Pieter Schothorst	P	All
(Germany) Attempto Racing	Audi R8 LMS Evo II	99	(Germany) Alex Aka	S	All
(Germany) Attempto Racing	Audi R8 LMS Evo II	99	(Austria) Nicolas Schöll	S	All
(United Kingdom) Barwell Motorsport	Lamborghini Huracán GT3 Evo	78	(United Kingdom) Ben Barker	PA	1
(United Kingdom) Barwell Motorsport	Lamborghini Huracán GT3 Evo	78	Alex Malykhin (Note: Alex Malykhin is Belarusian and Timur Boguslavskiy is Russian, but they both competed as neutral competitors as Belarusian and Russian national emblems were banned by the FIA due to the Russian invasion of Ukraine.)	PA	1
(France) AKKodis ASP Team	Mercedes-AMG GT3 Evo	86	(Romania) Petru Umbrărescu	S	All
(France) AKKodis ASP Team	Mercedes-AMG GT3 Evo	86	(Poland) Igor Waliłko	S	All
(France) AKKodis ASP Team	Mercedes-AMG GT3 Evo	87	(France) Thomas Drouet	S	All
(France) AKKodis ASP Team	Mercedes-AMG GT3 Evo	87	(United Kingdom) Casper Stevenson	S	All
(France) AKKodis ASP Team	Mercedes-AMG GT3 Evo	88	(France) Jim Pla	P	All
(France) AKKodis ASP Team	Mercedes-AMG GT3 Evo	88	(France) Jules Gounon	P	1, 3–4
(France) AKKodis ASP Team	Mercedes-AMG GT3 Evo	88	(Germany) Maximilian Götz	P	2
(France) AKKodis ASP Team	Mercedes-AMG GT3 Evo	88	(France) Tristan Vautier	P	5
(France) AKKodis ASP Team	Mercedes-AMG GT3 Evo	89	Timur Boguslavskiy	P	All
(France) AKKodis ASP Team	Mercedes-AMG GT3 Evo	89	(Switzerland) Raffaele Marciello	P	All
(Spain) Madpanda Motorsport	Mercedes-AMG GT3 Evo	90	(Argentina) Ezequiel Pérez Companc	S	5
(Spain) Madpanda Motorsport	Mercedes-AMG GT3 Evo	90	(Germany) Fabian Schiller	S	5
(United Kingdom) Sky - Tempesta with GruppeM Racing	Mercedes-AMG GT3 Evo	93	(Italy) Eddie Cheever III	S	1–4
(United Kingdom) Sky - Tempesta with GruppeM Racing	Mercedes-AMG GT3 Evo	93	(United Kingdom) Chris Froggatt	S	1–4
(United Kingdom) Sky - Tempesta Racing by HRT	Mercedes-AMG GT3 Evo	93	(Italy) Eddie Cheever III	S	5
(United Kingdom) Sky - Tempesta Racing by HRT	Mercedes-AMG GT3 Evo	93	(United Kingdom) Chris Froggatt	S	5
(Poland) JP Motorsport	McLaren 720S GT3	111	(Poland) Patryk Krupiński	PA	All
(Poland) JP Motorsport	McLaren 720S GT3	111	(Austria) Christian Klien	PA	1–3, 5
(Poland) JP Motorsport	McLaren 720S GT3	111	(Austria) Norbert Siedler	PA	4
(Poland) JP Motorsport	McLaren 720S GT3	112	(Monaco) Vincent Abril	P	3–5
(Poland) JP Motorsport	McLaren 720S GT3	112	(Denmark) Dennis Lind	P	3–5
(United Kingdom) Garage 59	McLaren 720S GT3	159	(Venezuela) Manuel Maldonado	S	All
(United Kingdom) Garage 59	McLaren 720S GT3	159	(Canada) Ethan Simioni	S	1–4
(United Kingdom) Garage 59	McLaren 720S GT3	159	(Denmark) Nicolai Kjærgaard	S	5
(United Kingdom) Garage 59	McLaren 720S GT3	188	(United Kingdom) Dean MacDonald	PA	All
(United Kingdom) Garage 59	McLaren 720S GT3	188	(Portugal) Miguel Ramos	PA	All
(Italy) Imperiale Racing	Lamborghini Huracán GT3 Evo	663	(Spain) Albert Costa	P	4
(Italy) Imperiale Racing	Lamborghini Huracán GT3 Evo	663	(Italy) Alberto Di Folco	P	4
(Italy) LP Racing	Lamborghini Huracán GT3 Evo	888	(Venezuela) Jonathan Cecotto	S	4
(Italy) LP Racing	Lamborghini Huracán GT3 Evo	888	(Italy) Mattia di Giusto	S	4

Icon	Class
P	Pro Cup
S	Silver Cup
PA	Pro-Am Cup

== Race results ==
Round		Circuit	Pole position	Overall winners	Silver winners	Pro/Am winners	Report
1	R1	(United Kingdom) Brands Hatch	(Italy) No. 53 AF Corse	(Italy) No. 53 AF Corse	(Italy) No. 53 AF Corse	(Italy) No. 21 AF Corse	Report
1	R1	(United Kingdom) Brands Hatch	(France) Pierre-Alexandre Jean (Belgium) Ulysse de Pauw	(France) Pierre-Alexandre Jean (Belgium) Ulysse de Pauw	(France) Pierre-Alexandre Jean (Belgium) Ulysse de Pauw	(France) Hugo Delacour (Monaco) Cédric Sbirrazzuoli	Report
1	R2	(United Kingdom) Brands Hatch	(France) No. 89 AKKodis ASP Team	(France) No. 89 AKKodis ASP Team	(Italy) No. 53 AF Corse	(Poland) No. 111 JP Motorsport	Report
1	R2	(United Kingdom) Brands Hatch	Timur Boguslavskiy (Switzerland) Raffaele Marciello	Timur Boguslavskiy (Switzerland) Raffaele Marciello	(France) Pierre-Alexandre Jean (Belgium) Ulysse de Pauw	(Austria) Christian Klien (Poland) Patryk Krupiński	Report
2	R1	(France) Magny-Cours	(Italy) No. 11 Tresor by Car Collection	(Belgium) No. 32 Team WRT	(France) No. 26 Saintéloc Junior Team	(United Kingdom) No. 188 Garage 59	Report
2	R1	(France) Magny-Cours	(France) Simon Gachet (Germany) Christopher Haase	(Belgium) Dries Vanthoor (Belgium) Charles Weerts	(Belgium) Nicolas Baert (Belgium) Gilles Magnus	(United Kingdom) Dean MacDonald (Portugal) Miguel Ramos	Report
2	R2	(France) Magny-Cours	(France) No. 89 AKKodis ASP Team	(France) No. 89 AKKodis ASP Team	(Italy) No. 53 AF Corse	(Poland) No. 111 JP Motorsport	Report
2	R2	(France) Magny-Cours	Timur Boguslavskiy (Switzerland) Raffaele Marciello	Timur Boguslavskiy (Switzerland) Raffaele Marciello	(France) Pierre-Alexandre Jean (Belgium) Ulysse de Pauw	(Austria) Christian Klien (Poland) Patryk Krupiński	Report
3	R1	(Netherlands) Zandvoort	(Belgium) No. 32 Team WRT	(Belgium) No. 32 Team WRT	(Italy) No. 53 AF Corse	(Italy) No. 21 AF Corse	Report
3	R1	(Netherlands) Zandvoort	(Belgium) Dries Vanthoor (Belgium) Charles Weerts	(Belgium) Dries Vanthoor (Belgium) Charles Weerts	(France) Pierre-Alexandre Jean (Belgium) Ulysse de Pauw	(Italy) Stefano Costantini (Monaco) Cédric Sbirrazzuoli	Report
3	R2	(Netherlands) Zandvoort	(France) No. 89 AKKodis ASP Team	(France) No. 89 AKKodis ASP Team	(Germany) No. 99 Attempto Racing	(United Kingdom) No. 188 Garage 59	Report
3	R2	(Netherlands) Zandvoort	Timur Boguslavskiy (Switzerland) Raffaele Marciello	Timur Boguslavskiy (Switzerland) Raffaele Marciello	(Germany) Alex Aka (Austria) Nicolas Schöll	(United Kingdom) Dean MacDonald (Portugal) Miguel Ramos	Report
4	R1	(Italy) Misano	(Belgium) No. 32 Team WRT	(Belgium) No. 32 Team WRT	(Belgium) No. 30 Team WRT	(United Kingdom) No. 188 Garage 59	Report
4	R1	(Italy) Misano	(Belgium) Dries Vanthoor (Belgium) Charles Weerts	(Belgium) Dries Vanthoor (Belgium) Charles Weerts	(Denmark) Benjamin Goethe (France) Thomas Neubauer	(United Kingdom) Dean MacDonald (Portugal) Miguel Ramos	Report
4	R2	(Italy) Misano	(Belgium) No. 32 Team WRT	(Belgium) No. 32 Team WRT	(Italy) No. 53 AF Corse	(United Kingdom) No. 188 Garage 59	Report
4	R2	(Italy) Misano	(Belgium) Dries Vanthoor (Belgium) Charles Weerts	(Belgium) Dries Vanthoor (Belgium) Charles Weerts	(France) Pierre-Alexandre Jean (Belgium) Ulysse de Pauw	(United Kingdom) Dean MacDonald (Portugal) Miguel Ramos	Report
5	R1	(Spain) Valencia	(Italy) No. 53 AF Corse	(Italy) No. 53 AF Corse	(Italy) No. 53 AF Corse	(Poland) No. 111 JP Motorsport	Report
5	R1	(Spain) Valencia	(France) Pierre-Alexandre Jean (Belgium) Ulysse de Pauw	(France) Pierre-Alexandre Jean (Belgium) Ulysse de Pauw	(France) Pierre-Alexandre Jean (Belgium) Ulysse de Pauw	(Poland) Patryk Krupiński (Austria) Christian Klien	Report
5	R2	(Spain) Valencia	(France) No. 89 AKKodis ASP Team	(Belgium) No. 32 Team WRT	(Spain) No. 90 Madpanda Motorsport	(Poland) No. 111 JP Motorsport	Report
5	R2	(Spain) Valencia	Timur Boguslavskiy (Switzerland) Raffaele Marciello	(Belgium) Dries Vanthoor (Belgium) Charles Weerts	(Argentina) Ezequiel Pérez Companc (Germany) Fabian Schiller	(Poland) Patryk Krupiński (Austria) Christian Klien	Report

== Championship standings ==
Scoring system

Championship points are awarded for the first ten positions in each race. The pole-sitter also receives one point and entries are required to complete 75% of the winning car's race distance in order to be classified and earn points. Individual drivers are required to participate for a minimum of 25 minutes in order to earn championship points in any race.

Position	1st	2nd	3rd	4th	5th	6th	7th	8th	9th	10th	Pole
Points	16.5	12	9.5	7.5	6	4.5	3	2	1	0.5	1

=== Drivers' championships ===
==== Overall ====
Pos.	Drivers	Team	BRH (United Kingdom)		MAG (France)		ZAN (Netherlands)		MIS (Italy)		VAL (Spain)		Points
1	(Belgium) Dries Vanthoor (Belgium) Charles Weerts	(Belgium) Team WRT	2	2	1	6	1^{P}	2	1^{P}	1^{PF}	3^{F}	1	135.5
2	Timur Boguslavskiy (Switzerland) Raffaele Marciello	(France) AKKodis ASP Team	3^{F}	1^{PF}	2^{F}	1^{PF}	23^{F}	1^{P}	2^{F}	2	7	3^{P}	111.5
3	(France) Simon Gachet (Germany) Christopher Haase	(Italy) Tresor by Car Collection	7	4	3^{P}	Ret	3	Ret	4	3	2	4	67
4	(France) Pierre-Alexandre Jean (Belgium) Ulysse de Pauw	(Italy) AF Corse	1^{P}	5	7	5	4	9	8	8	1^{P}	17	62.5
5	(France) Jim Pla	(France) AKKodis ASP Team	4	3	10	2	2	4^{F}	10	6	13	12^{F}	54
6	(Switzerland) Patric Niederhauser (France) Aurélien Panis	(France) Saintéloc Junior Team	5	6	4	3	5	7	Ret	DNS	9	2	49.5
7	(France) Jules Gounon	(France) AKKodis ASP Team	4	3			2	4^{F}	10	6			41.5
8	(Germany) Dennis Marschall (Netherlands) Pieter Schothorst	(Germany) Attempto Racing	9	12	13	7	6	3	5	Ret	5	11	30
9	(Germany) Christopher Mies (France) Jean-Baptiste Simmenauer	(Belgium) Team WRT	Ret	14	9	4	9	23	6	4	10	22	22
10	(San Marino) Mattia Drudi	(Italy) Tresor by Car Collection	6	7	5	8	8	13	11	21	6	13	22
10	(Italy) Luca Ghiotto	(Italy) Tresor by Car Collection	6	7	5	8	8	13			6	13	22
11	(Denmark) Benjamin Goethe (France) Thomas Neubauer	(Belgium) Team WRT	Ret	16	11	13	10	10	3	10	4	15	18.5
12	(Germany) Maximilian Götz	(France) AKKodis ASP Team			10	2							12.5
13	(France) Thomas Drouet (United Kingdom) Casper Stevenson	(France) AKKodis ASP Team	8	11	8	12	7	14	9	16	8	8	12
14	(Monaco) Vincent Abril (Denmark) Dennis Lind	(Poland) JP Motorsport					Ret	5	14	12	17	7	9
15	(Belgium) Nicolas Baert	(France) Saintéloc Junior Team	11	18	6	16	19	11	7	11	12	9	8.5
16	(Italy) Valentino Rossi (Belgium) Frédéric Vervisch	(Belgium) Team WRT	13	8	15	11	14	16	Ret	5	22	Ret	8
17	(Argentina) Ezequiel Pérez Companc (Germany) Fabian Schiller	(Spain) Madpanda Motorsport									Ret	5	6
18	(Belgium) Gilles Magnus	(France) Saintéloc Junior Team	11	18	6	16	19	11			12	9	5.5
19	(Germany) Alex Aka (Austria) Nicolas Schöll	(Germany) Attempto Racing	10	9	14	9	12	8	Ret	9	19	20	5.5
20	(Belgium) Adrien de Leener (Germany) Christian Engelhart	(Italy) Dinamic Motorsport	Ret	Ret	12	10	17	6	12	Ret	Ret	14	5
21	(Venezuela) Manuel Maldonado	(United Kingdom) Garage 59	15	13	16	14	13	22	19	20	14	6	4.5
21	(Denmark) Nicolai Kjærgaard	(United Kingdom) Garage 59									14	6	4.5
22	(Switzerland) Lucas Légeret	(France) Saintéloc Junior Team							7	11			3
22	(Spain) Albert Costa (Italy) Alberto Di Folco	(Italy) Imperiale Racing							13	7			3
23	(United Kingdom) Rob Bell (United Kingdom) Oliver Wilkinson	(United Kingdom) Jota Sport	12	10									0.5
23	(Italy) Eddie Cheever III (United Kingdom) Chris Froggatt	(United Kingdom) Sky - Tempesta with GruppeM Racing	17	20	19	15	22	17	21	14			0.5
23	(Italy) Eddie Cheever III (United Kingdom) Chris Froggatt	(United Kingdom) Sky - Tempesta Racing by HRT									11	10	0.5
	(Austria) Klaus Bachler (Italy) Giorgio Roda	(Italy) Dinamic Motorsport	22†	21	20	18	11	19	16	13	Ret	19	0
	(Italy) Lorenzo Patrese	(Italy) Tresor by Car Collection							11	21			0
	(France) Tristan Vautier	(France) AKKodis ASP Team									13	12^{F}	0
	(Canada) Ethan Simioni	(United Kingdom) Garage 59	15	13	16	14	13	22	19	20			0
	(Monaco) Cédric Sbirrazzuoli	(Italy) AF Corse	14	23	22	20	15	21	Ret	DNS	16	23	0
	(France) Hugo Delacour	(Italy) AF Corse	14	23	22	20			Ret	DNS	16	23	0
	(Romania) Petru Umbrărescu (Poland) Igor Waliłko	(France) AKKodis ASP Team	20	15	17	19	21	12	15	22	Ret	18	0
	(United Kingdom) Dean MacDonald (Portugal) Miguel Ramos	(United Kingdom) Garage 59	19	22	18	21	Ret	15	17	15	20	21	0
	(Italy) Stefano Costantini	(Italy) AF Corse					15	21					0
	(Poland) Patryk Krupiński	(Poland) JP Motorsport	16	17	21	17	18	Ret	Ret	Ret	15	16	0
	(Austria) Christian Klien	(Poland) JP Motorsport	16	17	21	17	18	Ret			15	16	0
	(Netherlands) Danny Kroes	(Monaco) GSM Novamarine					20	20	Ret	17	21	25	0
	(Netherlands) Daan Pijl	(Monaco) GSM Novamarine							Ret	17			0
	(Italy) Andrea Bertolini (Belgium) Louis Machiels	(Italy) AF Corse	18	19	23	Ret	16	18	18	18	18	24	0
	(Venezuela) Jonathan Cecotto (Italy) Mattia di Giusto	(Italy) LP Racing							20	19			0
	(Switzerland) Lucas Mauron	(Monaco) GSM Novamarine					20	20					0
	(Spain) Isaac Tutumlu (Austria) Gerhard Tweraser	(Monaco) GSM Novamarine	21	24	24	22							0
	(Netherlands) Joshua Kreuger	(Monaco) GSM Novamarine									21	25	0
	(Austria) Norbert Siedler	(Poland) JP Motorsport							Ret	Ret			0
	(United Kingdom) Ben Barker; Alex Malykhin	(United Kingdom) Barwell Motorsport	DNS	DNS									0
Pos.	Drivers	Team	BRH (United Kingdom)		MAG (France)		ZAN (Netherlands)		MIS (Italy)		VAL (Spain)		Points

Key
Colour	Result
Gold	Race winner
Silver	2nd place
Bronze	3rd place
Green	Points finish
Blue	Non-points finish
Blue	Non-classified finish (NC)
Purple	Did not finish (Ret)
Black	Disqualified (DSQ)
Black	Excluded (EX)
White	Did not start (DNS)
White	Race cancelled (C)
White	Withdrew (WD)
Blank	Did not participate

P – Pole
F – Fastest Lap

Notes

- † – Drivers did not finish the race but were classified, as they completed more than 75% of the race distance.

==== Silver Cup ====
Pos.	Drivers	Team	BRH (United Kingdom)		MAG (France)		ZAN (Netherlands)		MIS (Italy)		VAL (Spain)		Points
1	(France) Pierre-Alexandre Jean (Belgium) Ulysse de Pauw	(Italy) AF Corse	1^{PF}	5^{PF}	7	5^{P}	4^{P}	9	8	8^{P}	1^{PF}	17^{F}	141.5
2	(France) Thomas Drouet (United Kingdom) Casper Stevenson	(France) AKKodis ASP Team	8	11	8	12	7	14	9	16	8	8	88
3	(Denmark) Benjamin Goethe (France) Thomas Neubauer	(Belgium) Team WRT	Ret	16	11	13^{F}	10^{F}	10	3^{PF}	10^{F}	4	15	82
4	(Germany) Alex Aka (Austria) Nicolas Schöll	(Germany) Attempto Racing	10	9	14^{F}	9	12	8^{P}	Ret	9	19	20	80.5
5	(Belgium) Nicolas Baert	(France) Saintéloc Junior Team	11	18	6^{P}	16	19	11^{F}	7	11	12	9	76
6	(Belgium) Gilles Magnus	(France) Saintéloc Junior Team	11	18	6^{P}	16	19	11^{F}			12	9	56.5
7	(Venezuela) Manuel Maldonado	(United Kingdom) Garage 59	15	13	16	14	13	22	19	20	14	6^{P}	54
8	(Italy) Eddie Cheever III (United Kingdom) Chris Froggatt	(United Kingdom) Sky - Tempesta with GruppeM Racing	17	20	19	15	22	17	21	14			38.5
8	(Italy) Eddie Cheever III (United Kingdom) Chris Froggatt	(United Kingdom) Sky - Tempesta Racing by HRT									11	10	38.5
9	(Canada) Ethan Simioni	(United Kingdom) Garage 59	15	13	16	14	13	22	19	20			36.5
10	(Romania) Petru Umbrărescu (Poland) Igor Waliłko	(France) AKKodis ASP Team	20	15	17	19	21	12	15	22	Ret	18	30.5
11	(Switzerland) Lucas Légeret	(France) Saintéloc Junior Team							7	11			19.5
12	(Denmark) Nicolai Kjærgaard	(United Kingdom) Garage 59									14	6^{P}	17.5
13	(Argentina) Ezequiel Pérez Companc (Germany) Fabian Schiller	(Spain) Madpanda Motorsport									Ret	5	16.5
14	(Netherlands) Danny Kroes	(Monaco) GSM Novamarine					20	20	Ret	17	21	25	10.5
15	(Venezuela) Jonathan Cecotto (Italy) Mattia di Giusto	(Italy) LP Racing							20	19			5
15	(Switzerland) Lucas Mauron	(Monaco) GSM Novamarine					20	20					5
16	(Spain) Isaac Tutumlu (Austria) Gerhard Tweraser	(Monaco) GSM Novamarine	21	24	24	22							5
17	(Netherlands) Daan Pijl	(Monaco) GSM Novamarine							Ret	17			3
Pos.	Drivers	Team	BRH (United Kingdom)		MAG (France)		ZAN (Netherlands)		MIS (Italy)		VAL (Spain)		Points

==== Pro-Am Cup ====
Pos.	Drivers	Team	BRH (United Kingdom)		MAG (France)		ZAN (Netherlands)		MIS (Italy)		VAL (Spain)		Points
1	(United Kingdom) Dean MacDonald (Portugal) Miguel Ramos	(United Kingdom) Garage 59	19	22^{F}	18^{P}	21^{P}	Ret^{P}	15^{P}	17^{PF}	15^{PF}	20	21^{P}	119
2	(Poland) Patryk Krupiński	(Poland) JP Motorsport	16	17	21	17	18^{F}	Ret^{F}	Ret	Ret	15^{F}	16^{F}	99.5
2	(Austria) Christian Klien	(Poland) JP Motorsport	16	17	21	17	18^{F}	Ret^{F}			15^{F}	16^{F}	99.5
3	(Italy) Andrea Bertolini (Belgium) Louis Machiels	(Italy) AF Corse	18^{P}	19	23	Ret	16	18	18	18	18	24	95
4	(Monaco) Cédric Sbirrazzuoli	(Italy) AF Corse	14^{F}	23	22	20	15	21	Ret	DNS	16^{P}	23	94
5	(France) Hugo Delacour	(Italy) AF Corse	14^{F}	23	22	20			Ret	DNS	16^{P}	23	68
6	(Italy) Stefano Costantini	(Italy) AF Corse					15	21					26
7	(United Kingdom) Ben Barker; Alex Malykhin	(United Kingdom) Barwell Motorsport	DNS	DNS^{P}									1
	(Austria) Norbert Siedler	(Poland) JP Motorsport							Ret	Ret			0
Pos.	Drivers	Team	BRH (United Kingdom)		MAG (France)		ZAN (Netherlands)		MIS (Italy)		VAL (Spain)		Points

== See also ==
- 2022 British GT Championship
- 2022 GT World Challenge Europe
- 2022 GT World Challenge Europe Endurance Cup
- 2022 GT World Challenge Asia
- 2022 GT World Challenge America
- 2022 GT World Challenge Australia
- 2022 Intercontinental GT Challenge
