= 2022 GT World Challenge Europe =

Motorsport events in Europe

The 2022 Fanatec GT World Challenge Europe Powered by AWS was the ninth season of GT World Challenge Europe. The season began at Imola on 3 April and ended at Catalunya on 2 October. The season consisted of 10 events: 5 Sprint Cup events, and 5 Endurance Cup events.

== Calendar ==
The provisional calendar was released on 4 September 2021, in which Hockenheimring replaced Nürburgring.
The calendar was updated on 29 October 2021, as Imola replaced Monza and the season opener was rescheduled to one week earlier.

| Round | Circuit | Date | Series |
|---|---|---|---|
| 1 | Imola Circuit, Imola, Italy | 1–3 April | Endurance |
| 2 | (United Kingdom) Brands Hatch, Kent, Great Britain | 30 April–1 May | Sprint |
| 3 | Circuit de Nevers Magny-Cours, Magny-Cours, France | 13–15 May | Sprint |
| 4 | Circuit Paul Ricard, Le Castellet, France | 3–5 June | Endurance |
| 5 | Circuit Zandvoort, Zandvoort, Netherlands | 17–19 June | Sprint |
| 6 | Misano World Circuit Marco Simoncelli, Misano Adriatico, Italy | 1–3 July | Sprint |
| 7 | Circuit de Spa-Francorchamps, Stavelot, Belgium | 28–31 July | Endurance |
| 8 | Hockenheimring, Hockenheim, Germany | 2–4 September | Endurance |
| 9 | Circuit Ricardo Tormo, Cheste, Spain | 16–18 September | Sprint |
| 10 | Circuit de Barcelona-Catalunya, Montmeló, Spain | 30 September–2 October | Endurance |

== Entries ==
| Team | Car | No. | Drivers | Class | Rounds |
|---|---|---|---|---|---|
| (Germany) / BWT Team GetSpeed Performance (Note: Car No. 2 entered as BWT Team GetSpeed Performance from Rounds 1 to 4 and as BWT AMG - Team GetSpeed at Round 7.); (Germany) / BWT AMG - Team GetSpeed | Mercedes-AMG GT3 Evo | 2 | (Netherlands) Steijn Schothorst | P | 1, 4, 7-8, 10 |
| (Germany) / BWT Team GetSpeed Performance; (Germany) / BWT AMG - Team GetSpeed | Mercedes-AMG GT3 Evo | 2 | (Germany) Luca Stolz | P | 1, 4, 7-8, 10 |
| (Germany) / BWT Team GetSpeed Performance; (Germany) / BWT AMG - Team GetSpeed | Mercedes-AMG GT3 Evo | 2 | (Germany) Maro Engel | P | 1, 4, 8, 10 |
| (Germany) / BWT Team GetSpeed Performance; (Germany) / BWT AMG - Team GetSpeed | Mercedes-AMG GT3 Evo | 2 | (Germany) Maximilian Götz | P | 7 |
| (Germany) GetSpeed Performance | Mercedes-AMG GT3 Evo | 3 | (France) Sébastien Baud | S | 1, 4, 7-8, 10 |
| (Germany) GetSpeed Performance | Mercedes-AMG GT3 Evo | 3 | (Denmark) Valdemar Eriksen | S | 1, 4, 7-8, 10 |
| (Germany) GetSpeed Performance | Mercedes-AMG GT3 Evo | 3 | (Canada) Jeff Kingsley | S | 1, 4, 7-8, 10 |
| (Germany) GetSpeed Performance | Mercedes-AMG GT3 Evo | 44 | (Germany) Patrick Assenheimer | G | 7 |
| (Germany) GetSpeed Performance | Mercedes-AMG GT3 Evo | 44 | (France) Michael Blanchemain | G | 7 |
| (Germany) GetSpeed Performance | Mercedes-AMG GT3 Evo | 44 | (Finland) Axel Blom | G | 7 |
| (Germany) GetSpeed Performance | Mercedes-AMG GT3 Evo | 44 | (France) Jim Pla | G | 7 |
| (Germany) Haupt Racing Team | Mercedes-AMG GT3 Evo | 4 | (Germany) Jannes Fittje | S | 1, 4, 7-8, 10 |
| (Germany) Haupt Racing Team | Mercedes-AMG GT3 Evo | 4 | (Australia) Jordan Love | S | 1, 4, 7-8, 10 |
| (Germany) Haupt Racing Team | Mercedes-AMG GT3 Evo | 4 | (Switzerland) Alain Valente | S | 1, 4, 7-8, 10 |
| (Germany) Haupt Racing Team | Mercedes-AMG GT3 Evo | 4 | (United Kingdom) Frank Bird | S | 7 |
| (Germany) Haupt Racing Team | Mercedes-AMG GT3 Evo | 5 | (Germany) Hubert Haupt | G | 1, 4, 7-8, 10 |
| (Germany) Haupt Racing Team | Mercedes-AMG GT3 Evo | 5 | (India) Arjun Maini | G | 1, 4, 7-8, 10 |
| (Germany) Haupt Racing Team | Mercedes-AMG GT3 Evo | 5 | (Germany) Florian Scholze | G | 1, 4, 7-8, 10 |
| (Germany) Haupt Racing Team | Mercedes-AMG GT3 Evo | 5 | (Italy) Gabriele Piana | G | 7 |
| (United Kingdom) Sky - Tempesta Racing by HRT | Mercedes-AMG GT3 Evo | 93 | (Italy) Eddie Cheever III | G | 7-10 |
| (United Kingdom) Sky - Tempesta Racing by HRT | Mercedes-AMG GT3 Evo | 93 | (United Kingdom) Chris Froggatt | G | 7-10 |
| (United Kingdom) Sky - Tempesta Racing by HRT | Mercedes-AMG GT3 Evo | 93 | (Hong Kong) Jonathan Hui | G | 7, 10 |
| (United Kingdom) Sky - Tempesta Racing by HRT | Mercedes-AMG GT3 Evo | 93 | (Italy) Loris Spinelli | G | 7 |
| (United Kingdom) Sky - Tempesta Racing by HRT | Mercedes-AMG GT3 Evo | 93 | (Austria) Martin Konrad | G | 8 |
| (Oman) Al Manar Racing by HRT | Mercedes-AMG GT3 Evo | 777 | (Oman) Al Faisal Al Zubair | S | 1, 4, 7-8, 10 |
| (Oman) Al Manar Racing by HRT | Mercedes-AMG GT3 Evo | 777 | (Zimbabwe) Axcil Jefferies | S | 1, 4, 7-8, 10 |
| (Oman) Al Manar Racing by HRT | Mercedes-AMG GT3 Evo | 777 | (Germany) Fabian Schiller | S | 1, 4, 7-8, 10 |
| (Oman) Al Manar Racing by HRT | Mercedes-AMG GT3 Evo | 777 | (Canada) Daniel Morad | S | 7 |
| (United States) Orange 1 K-PAX Racing | Lamborghini Huracán GT3 Evo | 6 | (Italy) Andrea Caldarelli | P | 7 |
| (United States) Orange 1 K-PAX Racing | Lamborghini Huracán GT3 Evo | 6 | (Italy) Marco Mapelli | P | 7 |
| (United States) Orange 1 K-PAX Racing | Lamborghini Huracán GT3 Evo | 6 | (South Africa) Jordan Pepper | P | 7 |
| (United Kingdom) Inception Racing with Optimum Motorsport | McLaren 720S GT3 | 7 | (United States) Brendan Iribe | G | 1, 4, 7-8, 10 |
| (United Kingdom) Inception Racing with Optimum Motorsport | McLaren 720S GT3 | 7 | (United Kingdom) Ollie Millroy | G | 1, 4, 7-8, 10 |
| (United Kingdom) Inception Racing with Optimum Motorsport | McLaren 720S GT3 | 7 | (Denmark) Frederik Schandorff | G | 1, 4, 7-8, 10 |
| (United Kingdom) Inception Racing with Optimum Motorsport | McLaren 720S GT3 | 7 | (Guernsey) Sebastian Priaulx | G | 7 |
| (France) AGS Events | Lamborghini Huracán GT3 Evo | 8 | (France) Loris Cabirou | G | 1, 4, 7-8, 10 |
| (France) AGS Events | Lamborghini Huracán GT3 Evo | 8 | (France) Nicolas Gomar | G | 1, 4, 7-8, 10 |
| (France) AGS Events | Lamborghini Huracán GT3 Evo | 8 | (France) Mike Parisy | G | 1, 4, 7-8, 10 |
| (France) AGS Events | Lamborghini Huracán GT3 Evo | 8 | (Netherlands) Ruben del Sarte | G | 7 |
| (Germany) Herberth Motorsport | Porsche 911 GT3 R | 9 | (Hong Kong) Antares Au | PA | 7 |
| (Germany) Herberth Motorsport | Porsche 911 GT3 R | 9 | (New Zealand) Jaxon Evans | PA | 7 |
| (Germany) Herberth Motorsport | Porsche 911 GT3 R | 9 | (Luxembourg) Dylan Pereira | PA | 7 |
| (Germany) Herberth Motorsport | Porsche 911 GT3 R | 9 | (Macau) Kevin Tse | PA | 7 |
| (Germany) Herberth Motorsport | Porsche 911 GT3 R | 911 | (Germany) Ralf Bohn | G | 1, 4, 7-8, 10 |
| (Germany) Herberth Motorsport | Porsche 911 GT3 R | 911 | (Germany) Alfred Renauer | G | 1, 4, 7-8, 10 |
| (Germany) Herberth Motorsport | Porsche 911 GT3 R | 911 | (Germany) Robert Renauer | G | 1, 4, 7-8, 10 |
| (Switzerland) Porsche Zentrum Oberer Zürichsee by Herberth | Porsche 911 GT3 R | 24 | (Switzerland) Nicolas Leutwiler | PA | 4, 7 |
| (Switzerland) Porsche Zentrum Oberer Zürichsee by Herberth | Porsche 911 GT3 R | 24 | (Belgium) Alessio Picariello | PA | 4, 7 |
| (Switzerland) Porsche Zentrum Oberer Zürichsee by Herberth | Porsche 911 GT3 R | 24 | (Switzerland) Ivan Jacoma | PA | 4 |
| (Switzerland) Porsche Zentrum Oberer Zürichsee by Herberth | Porsche 911 GT3 R | 24 | (Germany) Stefan Aust | PA | 7 |
| (Switzerland) Porsche Zentrum Oberer Zürichsee by Herberth | Porsche 911 GT3 R | 24 | (Germany) Nico Menzel | PA | 7 |
| (Belgium) Boutsen Ginion Racing | Audi R8 LMS Evo II | 10 | (France) Adam Eteki | G | 1, 4, 7-8, 10 |
| (Belgium) Boutsen Ginion Racing | Audi R8 LMS Evo II | 10 | (Belgium) Benjamin Lessennes | G | 1, 4, 7-8, 10 |
| (Belgium) Boutsen Ginion Racing | Audi R8 LMS Evo II | 10 | (Saudi Arabia) Karim Ojjeh | G | 1, 4, 7-8, 10 |
| (Belgium) Boutsen Ginion Racing | Audi R8 LMS Evo II | 10 | (France) Antoine Leclerc | G | 7 |
| (Italy) / Tresor by Car Collection (Note: Car No. 11 entered as Tresor by Car Collection, Car No. 12 entered as Audi Sport Team Tresor at Round 7 and as Tresor by Car Collection at all other rounds.); (Italy) / Audi Sport Team Tresor | Audi R8 LMS Evo II | 11 | (Italy) Lorenzo Patrese | S | 1, 4, 7-8, 10 |
| (Italy) / Tresor by Car Collection; (Italy) / Audi Sport Team Tresor | Audi R8 LMS Evo II | 11 | (France) Hugo Valente | S | 1, 4, 8, 10 |
| (Italy) / Tresor by Car Collection; (Italy) / Audi Sport Team Tresor | Audi R8 LMS Evo II | 11 | (Finland) Axel Blom | S | 1, 4 |
| (Italy) / Tresor by Car Collection; (Italy) / Audi Sport Team Tresor | Audi R8 LMS Evo II | 11 | (Italy) Daniele di Amato | S | 7 |
| (Italy) / Tresor by Car Collection; (Italy) / Audi Sport Team Tresor | Audi R8 LMS Evo II | 11 | (Italy) Alberto di Folco | S | 7 |
| (Italy) / Tresor by Car Collection; (Italy) / Audi Sport Team Tresor | Audi R8 LMS Evo II | 11 | (France) Pierre-Alexandre Jean | S | 7 |
| (Italy) / Tresor by Car Collection; (Italy) / Audi Sport Team Tresor | Audi R8 LMS Evo II | 11 | (Netherlands) Thierry Vermeulen | S | 8, 10 |
| (Italy) / Tresor by Car Collection; (Italy) / Audi Sport Team Tresor | Audi R8 LMS Evo II | 11 | (France) Simon Gachet | P | 2-3, 5-6, 9 |
| (Italy) / Tresor by Car Collection; (Italy) / Audi Sport Team Tresor | Audi R8 LMS Evo II | 11 | (Germany) Christopher Haase | P | 2-3, 5-6, 9 |
| (Italy) / Tresor by Car Collection; (Italy) / Audi Sport Team Tresor | Audi R8 LMS Evo II | 12 | (San Marino) Mattia Drudi (Note: Drudi is an Italian driver competing under a Sammarinese licence.) | P | All |
| (Italy) / Tresor by Car Collection; (Italy) / Audi Sport Team Tresor | Audi R8 LMS Evo II | 12 | (Italy) Luca Ghiotto | P | 1-8, 10 |
| (Italy) / Tresor by Car Collection; (Italy) / Audi Sport Team Tresor | Audi R8 LMS Evo II | 12 | (Germany) Christopher Haase | P | 1, 4, 7-8, 10 |
| (Italy) / Tresor by Car Collection; (Italy) / Audi Sport Team Tresor | Audi R8 LMS Evo II | 12 | (Italy) Lorenzo Patrese | P | 9 |
| (Switzerland) Emil Frey Racing | Lamborghini Huracán GT3 Evo | 14 | (Finland) Konsta Lappalainen | S | 1, 4, 7-8, 10 |
| (Switzerland) Emil Frey Racing | Lamborghini Huracán GT3 Evo | 14 | (South Africa) Stuart White | S | 1, 4, 7-8, 10 |
| (Switzerland) Emil Frey Racing | Lamborghini Huracán GT3 Evo | 14 | (Finland) Tuomas Tujula | S | 1, 4, 7 |
| (Switzerland) Emil Frey Racing | Lamborghini Huracán GT3 Evo | 14 | (Austria) Mick Wishofer | S | 8, 10 |
| (Switzerland) Emil Frey Racing | Lamborghini Huracán GT3 Evo | 19 | (Italy) Giacomo Altoè | P | 1, 4, 7-8, 10 |
| (Switzerland) Emil Frey Racing | Lamborghini Huracán GT3 Evo | 19 | (France) Arthur Rougier | P | 1, 4, 7-8, 10 |
| (Switzerland) Emil Frey Racing | Lamborghini Huracán GT3 Evo | 19 | (France) Léo Roussel | P | 1, 4, 7-8, 10 |
| (Switzerland) Emil Frey Racing | Lamborghini Huracán GT3 Evo | 63 | (United Kingdom) Jack Aitken | P | 1, 4, 7-8, 10 |
| (Switzerland) Emil Frey Racing | Lamborghini Huracán GT3 Evo | 63 | (Italy) Mirko Bortolotti | P | 1, 4, 7-8, 10 |
| (Switzerland) Emil Frey Racing | Lamborghini Huracán GT3 Evo | 63 | (Spain) Albert Costa | P | 1, 4, 7-8, 10 |
| (Australia) EBM Grove Racing | Porsche 911 GT3 R | 16 | (Malaysia) Adrian D'Silva | PA | 7 |
| (Australia) EBM Grove Racing | Porsche 911 GT3 R | 16 | (Australia) Brenton Grove | PA | 7 |
| (Australia) EBM Grove Racing | Porsche 911 GT3 R | 16 | (Australia) Stephen Grove | PA | 7 |
| (Australia) EBM Grove Racing | Porsche 911 GT3 R | 16 | (New Zealand) Matthew Payne | PA | 7 |
| (Thailand) Singha Racing Team TP 12 | Porsche 911 GT3 R | 39 | (Thailand) Piti Bhirombhakdi | G | 4, 7 |
| (Thailand) Singha Racing Team TP 12 | Porsche 911 GT3 R | 39 | (Thailand) Tanart Sathienthirakul | G | 4, 7 |
| (Thailand) Singha Racing Team TP 12 | Porsche 911 GT3 R | 39 | (New Zealand) Matthew Payne | G | 4 |
| (Thailand) Singha Racing Team TP 12 | Porsche 911 GT3 R | 39 | (New Zealand) Earl Bamber | G | 7 |
| (Thailand) Singha Racing Team TP 12 | Porsche 911 GT3 R | 39 | (France) Christophe Hamon | G | 7 |
| (Monaco) GSM Novamarine | Lamborghini Huracán GT3 Evo | 18 | (Spain) Isaac Tutumlu | S | 2-3 |
| (Monaco) GSM Novamarine | Lamborghini Huracán GT3 Evo | 18 | (Austria) Gerhard Tweraser | S | 2-3 |
| (Monaco) GSM Novamarine | Lamborghini Huracán GT3 Evo | 18 | (Netherlands) Danny Kroes | S | 5-6, 9 |
| (Monaco) GSM Novamarine | Lamborghini Huracán GT3 Evo | 18 | (Switzerland) Lucas Mauron | S | 5 |
| (Monaco) GSM Novamarine | Lamborghini Huracán GT3 Evo | 18 | (Netherlands) Daan Pijl | S | 6 |
| (Monaco) GSM Novamarine | Lamborghini Huracán GT3 Evo | 18 | (Netherlands) Joshua John Kreuger | S | 9 |
| (Germany) SPS Automotive Performance | Mercedes-AMG GT3 Evo | 20 | (Germany) Valentin Pierburg | PA | 1, 4, 8, 10 |
| (Germany) SPS Automotive Performance | Mercedes-AMG GT3 Evo | 20 | (Austria) Dominik Baumann | PA | 1, 4, 8, 10 |
| (Germany) SPS Automotive Performance | Mercedes-AMG GT3 Evo | 20 | (United Kingdom) Ian Loggie | PA | 1, 8, 10 |
| (Germany) SPS Automotive Performance | Mercedes-AMG GT3 Evo | 20 | (Austria) Martin Konrad | PA | 4 |
| (Germany) SPS Automotive Performance | Mercedes-AMG GT3 Evo | 20 | (Germany) Valentin Pierburg | B | 7 |
| (Germany) SPS Automotive Performance | Mercedes-AMG GT3 Evo | 20 | (Saudi Arabia) Reema Juffali | B | 7 |
| (Germany) SPS Automotive Performance | Mercedes-AMG GT3 Evo | 20 | (United States) George Kurtz | B | 7 |
| (Germany) SPS Automotive Performance | Mercedes-AMG GT3 Evo | 20 | (Germany) Tim Müller | B | 7 |
| (Australia) SunEnergy1 Racing | Mercedes-AMG GT3 Evo | 75 | (Austria) Dominik Baumann | PA | 7 |
| (Australia) SunEnergy1 Racing | Mercedes-AMG GT3 Evo | 75 | (United Kingdom) Philip Ellis | PA | 7 |
| (Australia) SunEnergy1 Racing | Mercedes-AMG GT3 Evo | 75 | (Australia) Kenny Habul | PA | 7 |
| (Australia) SunEnergy1 Racing | Mercedes-AMG GT3 Evo | 75 | (Austria) Martin Konrad | PA | 7 |
| (Italy) AF Corse | Ferrari 488 GT3 Evo 2020 | 21 | (Italy) Alessandro Balzan | G | 1, 4, 7-8, 10 |
| (Italy) AF Corse | Ferrari 488 GT3 Evo 2020 | 21 | (France) Hugo Delacour | G | 1, 4, 7-8, 10 |
| (Italy) AF Corse | Ferrari 488 GT3 Evo 2020 | 21 | (Monaco) Cedric Sbirrazzuoli | G | 1, 4, 7-8, 10 |
| (Italy) AF Corse | Ferrari 488 GT3 Evo 2020 | 21 | (South Africa) David Perel | G | 7 |
| (Italy) AF Corse | Ferrari 488 GT3 Evo 2020 | 21 | (Monaco) Cedric Sbirrazzuoli | PA | 2-3, 5-6, 9 |
| (Italy) AF Corse | Ferrari 488 GT3 Evo 2020 | 21 | (France) Hugo Delacour | PA | 2-3, 6, 9 |
| (Italy) AF Corse | Ferrari 488 GT3 Evo 2020 | 21 | (Italy) Stefano Costantini | PA | 5 |
| (Italy) AF Corse | Ferrari 488 GT3 Evo 2020 | 52 | (Italy) Andrea Bertolini | PA | All |
| (Italy) AF Corse | Ferrari 488 GT3 Evo 2020 | 52 | (Belgium) Louis Machiels | PA | All |
| (Italy) AF Corse | Ferrari 488 GT3 Evo 2020 | 52 | (Italy) Stefano Costantini | PA | 1, 4, 7-8, 10 |
| (Italy) AF Corse | Ferrari 488 GT3 Evo 2020 | 52 | (Italy) Alessio Rovera | PA | 7 |
| (Italy) AF Corse | Ferrari 488 GT3 Evo 2020 | 53 | (France) Pierre-Alexandre Jean | S | 2-3, 5-6, 9 |
| (Italy) AF Corse | Ferrari 488 GT3 Evo 2020 | 53 | (Belgium) Ulysse de Pauw | S | 2-3, 5-6, 9 |
| (Germany) Allied Racing | Porsche 911 GT3 R | 22 | (Switzerland) Dominik Fischli | S | 1, 4, 7-8 |
| (Germany) Allied Racing | Porsche 911 GT3 R | 22 | (Denmark) Patrik Matthiesen | S | 1, 4, 7-8 |
| (Germany) Allied Racing | Porsche 911 GT3 R | 22 | (Germany) Joel Sturm | S | 1, 4, 7-8 |
| (Germany) Allied Racing | Porsche 911 GT3 R | 22 | (Germany) Vincent Andronaco | S | 7 |
| (Germany) Allied Racing | Porsche 911 GT3 R | 91 | (Fédération Internationale de l'Automobile) Alex Malykhin (Note: Alex Malykhin (Belarus), Timur Boguslavskiy and Konstantin Tereshchenko (Russia) competed as neutral competitors using the Fédération Internationale de l'Automobile flag as Belarusian and Russian national emblems were banned by the association due to the Russian invasion of Ukraine.) | G | 4, 7-8, 10 |
| (Germany) Allied Racing | Porsche 911 GT3 R | 91 | (United Kingdom) Ben Barker | G | 4 |
| (Germany) Allied Racing | Porsche 911 GT3 R | 91 | (United Kingdom) James Dorlin | G | 4 |
| (Germany) Allied Racing | Porsche 911 GT3 R | 91 | (Turkey) Ayhancan Güven | G | 7-8, 10 |
| (Germany) Allied Racing | Porsche 911 GT3 R | 91 | (Switzerland) Julian Apothéloz | G | 7 |
| (Germany) Allied Racing | Porsche 911 GT3 R | 91 | (France) Florian Latorre | G | 7 |
| (United States) Heart of Racing Team | Aston Martin Vantage AMR GT3 | 23 | (Republic of Ireland) Charlie Eastwood | P | 7 |
| (United States) Heart of Racing Team | Aston Martin Vantage AMR GT3 | 23 | (United Kingdom) Ross Gunn | P | 7 |
| (United States) Heart of Racing Team | Aston Martin Vantage AMR GT3 | 23 | (Spain) Alex Riberas | P | 7 |
| (France) / Audi Sport Team Saintéloc (Note: Car No. 25 entered as Audi Sport Team Saintéloc at Round 3 and as Saintéloc Racing at all other rounds, car No. 26 entered as Saintéloc Racing.); (France) / Saintéloc Racing | Audi R8 LMS Evo II | 25 | (Switzerland) Patric Niederhauser | P | All |
| (France) / Audi Sport Team Saintéloc; (France) / Saintéloc Racing | Audi R8 LMS Evo II | 25 | (Germany) Christopher Mies | P | 1, 4, 7-8, 10 |
| (France) / Audi Sport Team Saintéloc; (France) / Saintéloc Racing | Audi R8 LMS Evo II | 25 | (Switzerland) Lucas Légeret | P | 1, 4, 7-8, 10 |
| (France) / Audi Sport Team Saintéloc; (France) / Saintéloc Racing | Audi R8 LMS Evo II | 25 | (France) Aurélien Panis | P | 2-3, 5-6, 9 |
| (France) / Audi Sport Team Saintéloc; (France) / Saintéloc Racing | Audi R8 LMS Evo II | 26 | (Belgium) Nicolas Baert | S | 1, 4, 7-8, 10 |
| (France) / Audi Sport Team Saintéloc; (France) / Saintéloc Racing | Audi R8 LMS Evo II | 26 | (France) César Gazeau | S | 1, 4, 7-8, 10 |
| (France) / Audi Sport Team Saintéloc; (France) / Saintéloc Racing | Audi R8 LMS Evo II | 26 | (France) Aurélien Panis | S | 1, 4, 7-8, 10 |
| (France) / Audi Sport Team Saintéloc; (France) / Saintéloc Racing | Audi R8 LMS Evo II | 26 | (Belgium) Gilles Magnus | S | 7 |
| (Belgium) Comtoyou Racing with Saintéloc | Audi R8 LMS Evo II | 26 | (Belgium) Nicolas Baert | S | 2-3, 5-6, 9 |
| (Belgium) Comtoyou Racing with Saintéloc | Audi R8 LMS Evo II | 26 | (Belgium) Gilles Magnus | S | 2-3, 5, 9 |
| (Belgium) Comtoyou Racing with Saintéloc | Audi R8 LMS Evo II | 26 | (Switzerland) Lucas Légeret | S | 6 |
| (Germany) Leipert Motorsport | Lamborghini Huracán GT3 Evo | 27 | (New Zealand) Brendon Leitch | S | 1, 4, 7-8, 10 |
| (Germany) Leipert Motorsport | Lamborghini Huracán GT3 Evo | 27 | (Germany) Dennis Fetzer | S | 1 |
| (Germany) Leipert Motorsport | Lamborghini Huracán GT3 Evo | 27 | (United Kingdom) Jordan Witt | S | 1 |
| (Germany) Leipert Motorsport | Lamborghini Huracán GT3 Evo | 27 | (Spain) Isaac Tutumlu | S | 4, 7-8, 10 |
| (Germany) Leipert Motorsport | Lamborghini Huracán GT3 Evo | 27 | (United States) Tyler Cooke | S | 4, 7, 10 |
| (Germany) Leipert Motorsport | Lamborghini Huracán GT3 Evo | 27 | (Netherlands) Max Weering | S | 7 |
| (Germany) Leipert Motorsport | Lamborghini Huracán GT3 Evo | 27 | (Germany) Jusuf Owega | S | 8 |
| (Canada) ST Racing | BMW M4 GT3 | 28 | (United States) Harry Gottsacker | S | 7 |
| (Canada) ST Racing | BMW M4 GT3 | 28 | (Netherlands) Maxime Oosten | S | 7 |
| (Canada) ST Racing | BMW M4 GT3 | 28 | (Canada) Samantha Tan | S | 7 |
| (Canada) ST Racing | BMW M4 GT3 | 28 | (Canada) Nick Wittmer | S | 7 |
| (United Kingdom) ROFGO Racing with Team WRT | Audi R8 LMS Evo II | 30 | (Denmark) Benjamin Goethe | S | All |
| (United Kingdom) ROFGO Racing with Team WRT | Audi R8 LMS Evo II | 30 | (France) Thomas Neubauer | S | All |
| (United Kingdom) ROFGO Racing with Team WRT | Audi R8 LMS Evo II | 30 | (France) Jean-Baptiste Simmenauer | S | 1, 4, 7-8, 10 |
| (Belgium) / Audi Sport Team WRT (Note: Car No. 31 and No. 33 entered as Team WRT, car No. 32 entered as Audi Sport Team WRT at Round 7 and as Team WRT at all other rounds .); (Belgium) / Team WRT | Audi R8 LMS Evo II | 31 | (United Kingdom) Finlay Hutchison | S | 1, 4, 7-8, 10 |
| (Belgium) / Audi Sport Team WRT; (Belgium) / Team WRT | Audi R8 LMS Evo II | 31 | (Mexico) Diego Menchaca | S | 1, 4, 7-8, 10 |
| (Belgium) / Audi Sport Team WRT; (Belgium) / Team WRT | Audi R8 LMS Evo II | 31 | (United Kingdom) Lewis Proctor | S | 1, 4, 7-8, 10 |
| (Belgium) / Audi Sport Team WRT; (Belgium) / Team WRT | Audi R8 LMS Evo II | 32 | (Belgium) Dries Vanthoor | P | All |
| (Belgium) / Audi Sport Team WRT; (Belgium) / Team WRT | Audi R8 LMS Evo II | 32 | (Belgium) Charles Weerts | P | All |
| (Belgium) / Audi Sport Team WRT; (Belgium) / Team WRT | Audi R8 LMS Evo II | 32 | (South Africa) Kelvin van der Linde | P | 1, 4, 7-8 |
| (Belgium) / Audi Sport Team WRT; (Belgium) / Team WRT | Audi R8 LMS Evo II | 32 | (Switzerland) Ricardo Feller | P | 10 |
| (Belgium) / Audi Sport Team WRT; (Belgium) / Team WRT | Audi R8 LMS Evo II | 33 | (France) Arnold Robin | G | 1, 4, 7-8, 10 |
| (Belgium) / Audi Sport Team WRT; (Belgium) / Team WRT | Audi R8 LMS Evo II | 33 | (France) Maxime Robin | G | 1, 4, 7-8, 10 |
| (Belgium) / Audi Sport Team WRT; (Belgium) / Team WRT | Audi R8 LMS Evo II | 33 | (Japan) Ryuichiro Tomita | G | 1, 4, 7-8, 10 |
| (Belgium) / Audi Sport Team WRT; (Belgium) / Team WRT | Audi R8 LMS Evo II | 33 | (Belgium) Ulysse de Pauw | G | 7 |
| (Belgium) / Audi Sport Team WRT; (Belgium) / Team WRT | Audi R8 LMS Evo II | 33 | (Germany) Christopher Mies | P | 2-3, 5-6, 9 |
| (Belgium) / Audi Sport Team WRT; (Belgium) / Team WRT | Audi R8 LMS Evo II | 33 | (France) Jean-Baptiste Simmenauer | P | 2-3, 5-6, 9 |
| (Italy) Monster VR46 with Team WRT | Audi R8 LMS Evo II | 46 | (Italy) Valentino Rossi | P | All |
| (Italy) Monster VR46 with Team WRT | Audi R8 LMS Evo II | 46 | (Belgium) Frédéric Vervisch | P | All |
| (Italy) Monster VR46 with Team WRT | Audi R8 LMS Evo II | 46 | (Switzerland) Nico Müller | P | 1, 4, 7-8, 10 |
| (Germany) Walkenhorst Motorsport | BMW M4 GT3 | 34 | (United States) Michael Dinan | S | 7 |
| (Germany) Walkenhorst Motorsport | BMW M4 GT3 | 34 | (United States) Robby Foley | S | 7 |
| (Germany) Walkenhorst Motorsport | BMW M4 GT3 | 34 | (United States) Richard Heistand | S | 7 |
| (Germany) Walkenhorst Motorsport | BMW M4 GT3 | 34 | (Germany) Jens Klingmann | S | 7 |
| (Germany) Walkenhorst Motorsport | BMW M4 GT3 | 35 | (Germany) Jörg Breuer | B | 7 |
| (Germany) Walkenhorst Motorsport | BMW M4 GT3 | 35 | (Germany) Theo Oeverhaus | B | 7 |
| (Germany) Walkenhorst Motorsport | BMW M4 GT3 | 35 | (Germany) Henry Walkenhorst | B | 7 |
| (Germany) Walkenhorst Motorsport | BMW M4 GT3 | 35 | (United States) Don Yount | B | 7 |
| (United Kingdom) Jota Sport | McLaren 720S GT3 | 38 | (United Kingdom) Rob Bell | P | 1-4, 7-8, 10 |
| (United Kingdom) Jota Sport | McLaren 720S GT3 | 38 | (United Kingdom) Oliver Wilkinson | P | 1-4, 7-8, 10 |
| (United Kingdom) Jota Sport | McLaren 720S GT3 | 38 | (Germany) Marvin Kirchhöfer | P | 1, 4, 7-8, 10 |
| (Hong Kong) KCMG | Porsche 911 GT3 R | 47 | (Norway) Dennis Olsen | P | 7 |
| (Hong Kong) KCMG | Porsche 911 GT3 R | 47 | (United Kingdom) Nick Tandy | P | 7 |
| (Hong Kong) KCMG | Porsche 911 GT3 R | 47 | (Belgium) Laurens Vanthoor | P | 7 |
| (Germany) BMW Junior Team with ROWE Racing | BMW M4 GT3 | 50 | (United Kingdom) Daniel Harper | P | 1, 4, 7-8, 10 |
| (Germany) BMW Junior Team with ROWE Racing | BMW M4 GT3 | 50 | (Germany) Max Hesse | P | 1, 4, 7-8, 10 |
| (Germany) BMW Junior Team with ROWE Racing | BMW M4 GT3 | 50 | (United States) Neil Verhagen | P | 1, 4, 7-8, 10 |
| (Germany) ROWE Racing | BMW M4 GT3 | 98 | (Brazil) Augusto Farfus | P | 1, 4, 7-8, 10 |
| (Germany) ROWE Racing | BMW M4 GT3 | 98 | (United Kingdom) Nick Yelloly | P | 1, 4, 7-8, 10 |
| (Germany) ROWE Racing | BMW M4 GT3 | 98 | (Netherlands) Nicky Catsburg | P | 1, 4, 7-8 |
| (Germany) ROWE Racing | BMW M4 GT3 | 98 | (Austria) Philipp Eng | P | 10 |
| (Italy) Iron Lynx | Ferrari 488 GT3 Evo 2020 | 51 | (Spain) Miguel Molina | P | 1, 4, 7-8, 10 |
| (Italy) Iron Lynx | Ferrari 488 GT3 Evo 2020 | 51 | (Denmark) Nicklas Nielsen | P | 1, 4, 7-8, 10 |
| (Italy) Iron Lynx | Ferrari 488 GT3 Evo 2020 | 51 | (United Kingdom) James Calado | P | 1, 4, 7-8 |
| (Italy) Iron Lynx | Ferrari 488 GT3 Evo 2020 | 51 | (Italy) Giancarlo Fisichella | P | 10 |
| (Italy) Iron Lynx | Ferrari 488 GT3 Evo 2020 | 71 | (Italy) Antonio Fuoco | P | 1, 4, 7-8, 10 |
| (Italy) Iron Lynx | Ferrari 488 GT3 Evo 2020 | 71 | (Italy) Davide Rigon | P | 1, 4, 7-8 |
| (Italy) Iron Lynx | Ferrari 488 GT3 Evo 2020 | 71 | (Brazil) Daniel Serra | P | 1, 4, 7 |
| (Italy) Iron Lynx | Ferrari 488 GT3 Evo 2020 | 71 | (Italy) Alessio Rovera | P | 8, 10 |
| (Italy) Iron Lynx | Ferrari 488 GT3 Evo 2020 | 71 | (Italy) Alessandro Pier Guidi | P | 10 |
| (Italy) Iron Dames | Ferrari 488 GT3 Evo 2020 | 83 | (Belgium) Sarah Bovy | G | 1, 4, 7-8, 10 |
| (Italy) Iron Dames | Ferrari 488 GT3 Evo 2020 | 83 | (Switzerland) Rahel Frey | G | 1, 4, 7-8, 10 |
| (Italy) Iron Dames | Ferrari 488 GT3 Evo 2020 | 83 | (Denmark) Michelle Gatting | G | 1, 4, 7-8, 10 |
| (Italy) Iron Dames | Ferrari 488 GT3 Evo 2020 | 83 | (France) Doriane Pin | G | 7 |
| (Italy) Dinamic Motorsport | Porsche 911 GT3 R | 54 | (Austria) Klaus Bachler | P | 1, 4, 7-8, 10 |
| (Italy) Dinamic Motorsport | Porsche 911 GT3 R | 54 | (France) Côme Ledogar | P | 1, 4, 7 |
| (Italy) Dinamic Motorsport | Porsche 911 GT3 R | 54 | (Italy) Matteo Cairoli | P | 1, 4, 8, 10 |
| (Italy) Dinamic Motorsport | Porsche 911 GT3 R | 54 | (Belgium) Adrien de Leener | P | 2-3, 5-6, 9 |
| (Italy) Dinamic Motorsport | Porsche 911 GT3 R | 54 | (Germany) Christian Engelhart | P | 2-3, 5-6, 9 |
| (Italy) Dinamic Motorsport | Porsche 911 GT3 R | 54 | (Austria) Thomas Preining | P | 7 |
| (Italy) Dinamic Motorsport | Porsche 911 GT3 R | 54 | (Belgium) Alessio Picariello | P | 8, 10 |
| (Italy) Dinamic Motorsport | Porsche 911 GT3 R | 56 | (Norway) Marius Nakken | S | 1, 4, 7-8, 10 |
| (Italy) Dinamic Motorsport | Porsche 911 GT3 R | 56 | (Italy) Giorgio Roda | S | 1, 4, 7-8, 10 |
| (Italy) Dinamic Motorsport | Porsche 911 GT3 R | 56 | (Switzerland) Mauro Calamia | S | 1, 4, 7 |
| (Italy) Dinamic Motorsport | Porsche 911 GT3 R | 56 | (Denmark) Mikkel O. Pedersen | S | 7-8, 10 |
| (Italy) Dinamic Motorsport | Porsche 911 GT3 R | 56 | (Austria) Klaus Bachler | P | 2-3, 5-6, 9 |
| (Italy) Dinamic Motorsport | Porsche 911 GT3 R | 56 | (Italy) Giorgio Roda | P | 2-3, 5-6, 9 |
| (Hong Kong) / AMG - Team GruppeM Racing (Note: Car No. 55 entered as Mercedes-AMG - Team GruppeM Racing, car No. 93 entered as Sky - Tempesta with GruppeM Racing.); (Hong Kong) / Sky - Tempesta with GruppeM Racing | Mercedes-AMG GT3 Evo | 55 | (Germany) Maximilian Buhk | P | 7 |
| (Hong Kong) / AMG - Team GruppeM Racing; (Hong Kong) / Sky - Tempesta with GruppeM Racing | Mercedes-AMG GT3 Evo | 55 | (Germany) Maro Engel | P | 7 |
| (Hong Kong) / AMG - Team GruppeM Racing; (Hong Kong) / Sky - Tempesta with GruppeM Racing | Mercedes-AMG GT3 Evo | 55 | (Canada) Mikaël Grenier | P | 7 |
| (Hong Kong) / AMG - Team GruppeM Racing; (Hong Kong) / Sky - Tempesta with GruppeM Racing | Mercedes-AMG GT3 Evo | 93 | (Italy) Eddie Cheever III | G | 1, 4 |
| (Hong Kong) / AMG - Team GruppeM Racing; (Hong Kong) / Sky - Tempesta with GruppeM Racing | Mercedes-AMG GT3 Evo | 93 | (United Kingdom) Chris Froggatt | G | 1, 4 |
| (Hong Kong) / AMG - Team GruppeM Racing; (Hong Kong) / Sky - Tempesta with GruppeM Racing | Mercedes-AMG GT3 Evo | 93 | (Hong Kong) Jonathan Hui | G | 1, 4 |
| (Hong Kong) / AMG - Team GruppeM Racing; (Hong Kong) / Sky - Tempesta with GruppeM Racing | Mercedes-AMG GT3 Evo | 93 | (Italy) Eddie Cheever III | S | 2-3, 5-6 |
| (Hong Kong) / AMG - Team GruppeM Racing; (Hong Kong) / Sky - Tempesta with GruppeM Racing | Mercedes-AMG GT3 Evo | 93 | (United Kingdom) Chris Froggatt | S | 2-3, 5-6 |
| (United Kingdom) Sky - Tempesta Racing by HRT | Mercedes-AMG GT3 Evo | 93 | (Italy) Eddie Cheever III | S | 9 |
| (United Kingdom) Sky - Tempesta Racing by HRT | Mercedes-AMG GT3 Evo | 93 | (United Kingdom) Chris Froggatt | S | 9 |
| (United States) Winward Racing | Mercedes-AMG GT3 Evo | 57 | (Austria) Lucas Auer | G | 1, 4, 7-8, 10 |
| (United States) Winward Racing | Mercedes-AMG GT3 Evo | 57 | (Italy) Lorenzo Ferrari | G | 1, 4, 7-8, 10 |
| (United States) Winward Racing | Mercedes-AMG GT3 Evo | 57 | (Germany) Jens Liebhauser | G | 1, 4, 7-8, 10 |
| (United States) Winward Racing | Mercedes-AMG GT3 Evo | 57 | (United States) Russell Ward | G | 7 |
| (Germany) / Audi Sport Team Attempto (Note: Car No. 66 entered as Audi Sport Team Attempto at Round 7 and as Attempto Racing at all other rounds, Car No. 99 entered as Attempto Racing.); (Germany) / Attempto Racing | Audi R8 LMS Evo II | 66 | (Germany) Dennis Marschall | P | All |
| (Germany) / Audi Sport Team Attempto; (Germany) / Attempto Racing | Audi R8 LMS Evo II | 66 | (Germany) Markus Winkelhock | P | 1, 4, 7-8, 10 |
| (Germany) / Audi Sport Team Attempto; (Germany) / Attempto Racing | Audi R8 LMS Evo II | 66 | (Finland) Juuso Puhakka | P | 1, 4 |
| (Germany) / Audi Sport Team Attempto; (Germany) / Attempto Racing | Audi R8 LMS Evo II | 66 | (Netherlands) Pieter Schothorst | P | 2-3, 5-6, 9 |
| (Germany) / Audi Sport Team Attempto; (Germany) / Attempto Racing | Audi R8 LMS Evo II | 66 | (Switzerland) Ricardo Feller | P | 7 |
| (Germany) / Audi Sport Team Attempto; (Germany) / Attempto Racing | Audi R8 LMS Evo II | 66 | (Germany) Kim-Luis Schramm | P | 8, 10 |
| (Germany) / Audi Sport Team Attempto; (Germany) / Attempto Racing | Audi R8 LMS Evo II | 99 | (Germany) Alex Aka | S | All |
| (Germany) / Audi Sport Team Attempto; (Germany) / Attempto Racing | Audi R8 LMS Evo II | 99 | (Austria) Nicolas Schöll | S | All |
| (Germany) / Audi Sport Team Attempto; (Germany) / Attempto Racing | Audi R8 LMS Evo II | 99 | (Germany) Marius Zug | S | 1, 4, 7-8, 10 |
| (Germany) / Audi Sport Team Attempto; (Germany) / Attempto Racing | Audi R8 LMS Evo II | 99 | (Finland) Juuso Puhakka | S | 7 |
| (Australia) EMA Motorsport | Porsche 911 GT3 R | 74 | (Australia) Matt Campbell | P | 7 |
| (Australia) EMA Motorsport | Porsche 911 GT3 R | 74 | (France) Mathieu Jaminet | P | 7 |
| (Australia) EMA Motorsport | Porsche 911 GT3 R | 74 | (Brazil) Felipe Nasr | P | 7 |
| (United Kingdom) Barwell Motorsport | Lamborghini Huracán GT3 Evo | 77 | (United Kingdom) Alex MacDowall | G | 1, 4, 7 |
| (United Kingdom) Barwell Motorsport | Lamborghini Huracán GT3 Evo | 77 | (United Kingdom) Sandy Mitchell | G | 1, 4, 7 |
| (United Kingdom) Barwell Motorsport | Lamborghini Huracán GT3 Evo | 77 | (United Kingdom) Rob Collard | G | 1, 4 |
| (United Kingdom) Barwell Motorsport | Lamborghini Huracán GT3 Evo | 77 | (United Kingdom) Sam De Haan | G | 7 |
| (United Kingdom) Barwell Motorsport | Lamborghini Huracán GT3 Evo | 77 | (Oman) Ahmad Al Harthy | G | 7 |
| (United Kingdom) Barwell Motorsport | Lamborghini Huracán GT3 Evo | 77 | (United Kingdom) Alex MacDowall | S | 8, 10 |
| (United Kingdom) Barwell Motorsport | Lamborghini Huracán GT3 Evo | 77 | (United Kingdom) Sam De Haan | S | 8 |
| (United Kingdom) Barwell Motorsport | Lamborghini Huracán GT3 Evo | 77 | (Finland) Patrick Kujala | S | 8 |
| (United Kingdom) Barwell Motorsport | Lamborghini Huracán GT3 Evo | 77 | (United Kingdom) Jordan Witt | S | 10 |
| (United Kingdom) Barwell Motorsport | Lamborghini Huracán GT3 Evo | 77 | (United Kingdom) James Dorlin | S | 10 |
| (United Kingdom) Barwell Motorsport | Lamborghini Huracán GT3 Evo | 78 | (United Kingdom) Ben Barker | G | 1-2 |
| (United Kingdom) Barwell Motorsport | Lamborghini Huracán GT3 Evo | 78 | (Fédération Internationale de l'Automobile) Alex Malykhin | G | 1-2 |
| (United Kingdom) Barwell Motorsport | Lamborghini Huracán GT3 Evo | 78 | (United Kingdom) James Dorlin | G | 1 |
| (France) / AMG - Team AKKodis ASP (Note: Car No. 88 entered as AKKodis ASP Team at Round 1 to 6 and 9 and as Mercedes-AMG Team AKKodis ASP at Round 7, 8 and 10; other cars entered as AKKodis ASP Team.); (France) / AKKodis ASP Team | Mercedes-AMG GT3 Evo | 86 | (Romania) Petru Umbrărescu | S | 2-3, 5-6, 9 |
| (France) / AMG - Team AKKodis ASP; (France) / AKKodis ASP Team | Mercedes-AMG GT3 Evo | 86 | (Poland) Igor Waliłko | S | 2-3, 5-6, 9 |
| (France) / AMG - Team AKKodis ASP; (France) / AKKodis ASP Team | Mercedes-AMG GT3 Evo | 87 | (United Kingdom) Casper Stevenson | S | All |
| (France) / AMG - Team AKKodis ASP; (France) / AKKodis ASP Team | Mercedes-AMG GT3 Evo | 87 | (Italy) Tommaso Mosca | S | 1, 4, 7-8, 10 |
| (France) / AMG - Team AKKodis ASP; (France) / AKKodis ASP Team | Mercedes-AMG GT3 Evo | 87 | (Fédération Internationale de l'Automobile) Konstantin Tereshchenko | S | 1 |
| (France) / AMG - Team AKKodis ASP; (France) / AKKodis ASP Team | Mercedes-AMG GT3 Evo | 87 | (France) Thomas Drouet | S | 2-10 |
| (France) / AMG - Team AKKodis ASP; (France) / AKKodis ASP Team | Mercedes-AMG GT3 Evo | 88 | (France) Jules Gounon | P | 1-2, 4-8, 10 |
| (France) / AMG - Team AKKodis ASP; (France) / AKKodis ASP Team | Mercedes-AMG GT3 Evo | 88 | (Spain) Daniel Juncadella | P | 1, 4, 7-8, 10 |
| (France) / AMG - Team AKKodis ASP; (France) / AKKodis ASP Team | Mercedes-AMG GT3 Evo | 88 | (Switzerland) Raffaele Marciello | P | 1, 4, 7-8, 10 |
| (France) / AMG - Team AKKodis ASP; (France) / AKKodis ASP Team | Mercedes-AMG GT3 Evo | 88 | (France) Jim Pla | P | 2-3, 5-6, 9 |
| (France) / AMG - Team AKKodis ASP; (France) / AKKodis ASP Team | Mercedes-AMG GT3 Evo | 88 | (Germany) Maximilian Götz | P | 3 |
| (France) / AMG - Team AKKodis ASP; (France) / AKKodis ASP Team | Mercedes-AMG GT3 Evo | 88 | (France) Tristan Vautier | P | 9 |
| (France) / AMG - Team AKKodis ASP; (France) / AKKodis ASP Team | Mercedes-AMG GT3 Evo | 89 | (Fédération Internationale de l'Automobile) Timur Boguslavskiy | P | 2-3, 5-6, 9 |
| (France) / AMG - Team AKKodis ASP; (France) / AKKodis ASP Team | Mercedes-AMG GT3 Evo | 89 | (Switzerland) Raffaele Marciello | P | 2-3, 5-6, 9 |
| (Spain) Madpanda Motorsport | Mercedes-AMG GT3 Evo | 90 | (Argentina) Ezequiel Pérez Companc | S | 1, 4, 7-10 |
| (Spain) Madpanda Motorsport | Mercedes-AMG GT3 Evo | 90 | (United Kingdom) Sean Walkinshaw | S | 1, 4, 7-8, 10 |
| (Spain) Madpanda Motorsport | Mercedes-AMG GT3 Evo | 90 | (Serbia) Dušan Borković | S | 1 |
| (Spain) Madpanda Motorsport | Mercedes-AMG GT3 Evo | 90 | (Argentina) Franco Girolami | S | 4 |
| (Spain) Madpanda Motorsport | Mercedes-AMG GT3 Evo | 90 | (Finland) Patrick Kujala | S | 7 |
| (Spain) Madpanda Motorsport | Mercedes-AMG GT3 Evo | 90 | (Colombia) Óscar Tunjo | S | 7 |
| (Spain) Madpanda Motorsport | Mercedes-AMG GT3 Evo | 90 | (Germany) Patrick Assenheimer | S | 8 |
| (Spain) Madpanda Motorsport | Mercedes-AMG GT3 Evo | 90 | (Germany) Fabian Schiller | S | 9 |
| (United Kingdom) Beechdean AMR | Aston Martin Vantage AMR GT3 | 95 | (Belgium) Maxime Martin | P | 1, 4, 7 |
| (United Kingdom) Beechdean AMR | Aston Martin Vantage AMR GT3 | 95 | (Denmark) Marco Sørensen | P | 1, 4, 7 |
| (United Kingdom) Beechdean AMR | Aston Martin Vantage AMR GT3 | 95 | (Denmark) Nicki Thiim | P | 1, 4, 7 |
| (United Kingdom) Beechdean AMR | Aston Martin Vantage AMR GT3 | 97 | (France) Valentin Hasse-Clot | G | 1, 4 |
| (United Kingdom) Beechdean AMR | Aston Martin Vantage AMR GT3 | 97 | (United Kingdom) Andrew Howard | G | 1, 4 |
| (United Kingdom) Beechdean AMR | Aston Martin Vantage AMR GT3 | 97 | (France) Théo Nouet | G | 1, 4 |
| (United Kingdom) Beechdean AMR | Aston Martin Vantage AMR GT3 | 97 | (Canada) Roman De Angelis | S | 7 |
| (United Kingdom) Beechdean AMR | Aston Martin Vantage AMR GT3 | 97 | (United Kingdom) Charlie Fagg | S | 7 |
| (United Kingdom) Beechdean AMR | Aston Martin Vantage AMR GT3 | 97 | (France) Théo Nouet | S | 7 |
| (United Kingdom) Beechdean AMR | Aston Martin Vantage AMR GT3 | 97 | (United Kingdom) David Pittard | S | 7 |
| (Germany) Toksport WRT | Porsche 911 GT3 R | 100 | (France) Julien Andlauer | P | 7 |
| (Germany) Toksport WRT | Porsche 911 GT3 R | 100 | (Germany) Marvin Dienst | P | 7 |
| (Germany) Toksport WRT | Porsche 911 GT3 R | 100 | (Germany) Sven Müller | P | 7 |
| (France) CMR | Bentley Continental GT3 | 107 | (Belgium) Nigel Bailly | PA | 1, 4 |
| (France) CMR | Bentley Continental GT3 | 107 | (Belgium) Stéphane Lémeret | PA | 1, 4 |
| (France) CMR | Bentley Continental GT3 | 107 | (Belgium) Matthieu de Robiano | PA | 1, 4 |
| (France) CMR | Bentley Continental GT3 | 107 | (Belgium) Nigel Bailly | G | 7 |
| (France) CMR | Bentley Continental GT3 | 107 | (Belgium) Stéphane Lémeret | G | 7 |
| (France) CMR | Bentley Continental GT3 | 107 | (Switzerland) Antonin Borga | G | 7 |
| (France) CMR | Bentley Continental GT3 | 107 | (Belgium) Maxime Soulet | G | 7 |
| (Poland) JP Motorsport | McLaren 720S GT3 | 111 | (Monaco) Vincent Abril | P | 1, 4, 8, 10 |
| (Poland) JP Motorsport | McLaren 720S GT3 | 111 | (Austria) Christian Klien | P | 1, 4, 8, 10 |
| (Poland) JP Motorsport | McLaren 720S GT3 | 111 | (Denmark) Dennis Lind | P | 1, 4, 8, 10 |
| (Poland) JP Motorsport | McLaren 720S GT3 | 111 | (Poland) Patryk Krupiński | PA | 2-3, 5-6, 9 |
| (Poland) JP Motorsport | McLaren 720S GT3 | 111 | (Austria) Christian Klien | PA | 2-3, 5, 9 |
| (Poland) JP Motorsport | McLaren 720S GT3 | 111 | (Austria) Norbert Siedler | PA | 6 |
| (Poland) JP Motorsport | McLaren 720S GT3 | 112 | (Poland) Maciej Błażek | S | 1 |
| (Poland) JP Motorsport | McLaren 720S GT3 | 112 | (Germany) Christopher Brück | S | 1 |
| (Poland) JP Motorsport | McLaren 720S GT3 | 112 | (Poland) Patryk Krupiński | S | 1 |
| (Poland) JP Motorsport | McLaren 720S GT3 | 112 | (Poland) Maciej Błażek | G | 4, 8, 10 |
| (Poland) JP Motorsport | McLaren 720S GT3 | 112 | (Poland) Patryk Krupiński | G | 4, 8, 10 |
| (Poland) JP Motorsport | McLaren 720S GT3 | 112 | (United Kingdom) Joe Osborne | G | 4 |
| (Poland) JP Motorsport | McLaren 720S GT3 | 112 | (Austria) Norbert Siedler | G | 8, 10 |
| (Poland) JP Motorsport | McLaren 720S GT3 | 112 | (Monaco) Vincent Abril | P | 5-6, 9 |
| (Poland) JP Motorsport | McLaren 720S GT3 | 112 | (Denmark) Dennis Lind | P | 5-6, 9 |
| (United Kingdom) Garage 59 | McLaren 720S GT3 | 159 | (Venezuela) Manuel Maldonado | S | All |
| (United Kingdom) Garage 59 | McLaren 720S GT3 | 159 | (Canada) Ethan Simioni | S | 1-7 |
| (United Kingdom) Garage 59 | McLaren 720S GT3 | 159 | (Denmark) Nicolai Kjærgaard | S | 1, 4, 7-10 |
| (United Kingdom) Garage 59 | McLaren 720S GT3 | 159 | (United Kingdom) James Baldwin | S | 7 |
| (United Kingdom) Garage 59 | McLaren 720S GT3 | 159 | (United Kingdom) Dean MacDonald | S | 8, 10 |
| (United Kingdom) Garage 59 | McLaren 720S GT3 | 188 | (Portugal) Miguel Ramos | PA | All |
| (United Kingdom) Garage 59 | McLaren 720S GT3 | 188 | (Portugal) Henrique Chaves | PA | 1, 4, 7-8, 10 |
| (United Kingdom) Garage 59 | McLaren 720S GT3 | 188 | (Sweden) Alexander West | PA | 1, 4, 7-8, 10 |
| (United Kingdom) Garage 59 | McLaren 720S GT3 | 188 | (United Kingdom) Dean MacDonald | PA | 2-3, 5-7, 9 |
| (Italy) Vincenzo Sospiri Racing | Lamborghini Huracán GT3 Evo | 163 | (Belgium) Baptiste Moulin | S | 1, 4, 7-8, 10 |
| (Italy) Vincenzo Sospiri Racing | Lamborghini Huracán GT3 Evo | 163 | (Norway) Marcus Påverud | S | 1, 4, 7-8, 10 |
| (Italy) Vincenzo Sospiri Racing | Lamborghini Huracán GT3 Evo | 163 | (Mexico) Luis Michael Dörrbecker | S | 1, 4, 7-8 |
| (Italy) Vincenzo Sospiri Racing | Lamborghini Huracán GT3 Evo | 163 | (Italy) Mattia Michelotto | S | 7 |
| (Italy) Vincenzo Sospiri Racing | Lamborghini Huracán GT3 Evo | 163 | (Italy) Andrea Cola | S | 10 |
| (Italy) Vincenzo Sospiri Racing | Lamborghini Huracán GT3 Evo | 563 | (Italy) Michele Beretta | S | 1, 4, 7-8, 10 |
| (Italy) Vincenzo Sospiri Racing | Lamborghini Huracán GT3 Evo | 563 | (Chile) Benjamín Hites | S | 1, 4, 7-8, 10 |
| (Italy) Vincenzo Sospiri Racing | Lamborghini Huracán GT3 Evo | 563 | (Japan) Yuki Nemoto | S | 1, 4, 7-8, 10 |
| (Italy) Vincenzo Sospiri Racing | Lamborghini Huracán GT3 Evo | 563 | (Poland) Karol Basz | S | 7 |
| (United Arab Emirates) GPX Martini Racing | Porsche 911 GT3 R | 221 | (Denmark) Michael Christensen | P | 7 |
| (United Arab Emirates) GPX Martini Racing | Porsche 911 GT3 R | 221 | (France) Kévin Estre | P | 7 |
| (United Arab Emirates) GPX Martini Racing | Porsche 911 GT3 R | 221 | (Austria) Richard Lietz | P | 7 |
| (Italy) Imperiale Racing | Lamborghini Huracán GT3 Evo | 663 | (Spain) Albert Costa | P | 6 |
| (Italy) Imperiale Racing | Lamborghini Huracán GT3 Evo | 663 | (Italy) Alberto di Folco | P | 6 |
| (Italy) LP Racing | Lamborghini Huracán GT3 Evo | 888 | (Venezuela) Jonathan Cecotto | S | 6 |
| (Italy) LP Racing | Lamborghini Huracán GT3 Evo | 888 | (Italy) Mattia di Giusto | S | 6 |

| Icon | Class |
|---|---|
| P | Pro Cup |
| S | Silver Cup |
| PA | Pro-Am Cup |
| G | Gold Cup |
| B | Bronze Cup |

== Race results ==
| Round | | Circuit | Pole position | Overall winners | Silver winners | Pro/Am winners | Gold Cup winners | Am winners | Report |
|---|---|---|---|---|---|---|---|---|---|
| 1 | | (Italy) Imola | (Belgium) #32 Team WRT | (Belgium) #32 Team WRT | (United Kingdom) #30 ROFGO Racing with Team WRT | (Germany) #20 SPS Automotive Performance | (Germany) #911 Herberth Motorsport | No Entries | Report |
| 1 | | (Italy) Imola | (South Africa) Kelvin van der Linde (Belgium) Dries Vanthoor (Belgium) Charles Weerts | (South Africa) Kelvin van der Linde (Belgium) Dries Vanthoor (Belgium) Charles Weerts | (Denmark) Benjamin Goethe (France) Thomas Neubauer (France) Jean-Baptiste Simmenauer | (Austria) Dominik Baumann (United Kingdom) Ian Loggie (Germany) Valentin Pierburg | (Germany) Ralf Bohn (Germany) Alfred Renauer (Germany) Robert Renauer | No Entries | Report |
| 2 | R1 | (United Kingdom) Brands Hatch | (Italy) No. 53 AF Corse | (Italy) No. 53 AF Corse | (Italy) No. 53 AF Corse | (Italy) No. 21 AF Corse | No Entries | No Entries | Report |
| 2 | R1 | (United Kingdom) Brands Hatch | (France) Pierre-Alexandre Jean (Belgium) Ulysse De Pauw | (France) Pierre-Alexandre Jean (Belgium) Ulysse De Pauw | (France) Pierre-Alexandre Jean (Belgium) Ulysse De Pauw | (Italy) Hugo Delacour (Monaco) Cedric Sbirrazzuoli | No Entries | No Entries | Report |
| 2 | R2 | (United Kingdom) Brands Hatch | (France) No. 89 AKKodis ASP Team | (France) No. 89 AKKodis ASP Team | (Italy) No. 53 AF Corse | (Poland) No. 111 JP Motorsport | No Entries | No Entries | Report |
| 2 | R2 | (United Kingdom) Brands Hatch | (Fédération Internationale de l'Automobile) Timur Boguslavskiy (Switzerland) Raffaele Marciello | (Fédération Internationale de l'Automobile) Timur Boguslavskiy (Switzerland) Raffaele Marciello | (France) Pierre-Alexandre Jean (Belgium) Ulysse De Pauw | (Austria) Christian Klien (Poland) Patryk Krupiński | No Entries | No Entries | Report |
| 3 | R1 | (France) Magny-Cours | (Italy) No. 11 Tresor by Car Collection | (Belgium) No. 32 Team WRT | (Belgium) No. 26 Comtoyou Racing with Saintéloc | (United Kingdom) No. 188 Garage 59 | No Entries | No Entries | Report |
| 3 | R1 | (France) Magny-Cours | (France) Simon Gachet (Germany) Christopher Haase | (Belgium) Dries Vanthoor (Belgium) Charles Weerts | (Belgium) Nicolas Baert (Belgium) Gilles Magnus | (United Kingdom) Dean MacDonald (Portugal) Miguel Ramos | No Entries | No Entries | Report |
| 3 | R2 | (France) Magny-Cours | (France) No. 89 AKKodis ASP Team | (France) No. 89 AKKodis ASP Team | (Italy) No. 53 AF Corse | (Poland) No. 111 JP Motorsport | No Entries | No Entries | Report |
| 3 | R2 | (France) Magny-Cours | (Fédération Internationale de l'Automobile) Timur Boguslavskiy (Switzerland) Raffaele Marciello | (Fédération Internationale de l'Automobile) Timur Boguslavskiy (Switzerland) Raffaele Marciello | (France) Pierre-Alexandre Jean (Belgium) Ulysse De Pauw | (Austria) Christian Klien (Poland) Patryk Krupiński | No Entries | No Entries | Report |
| 4 | | (France) Paul Ricard | (Italy) #71 Iron Lynx | (Italy) #71 Iron Lynx | (Oman) #777 Al Manar Racing by HRT | (Germany) #20 SPS Automotive Performance | (United Kingdom) #7 Inception Racing with Optimum Motorsport | No Entries | Report |
| 4 | | (France) Paul Ricard | (Italy) Antonio Fuoco (Italy) Davide Rigon (Brazil) Daniel Serra | (Italy) Antonio Fuoco (Italy) Davide Rigon (Brazil) Daniel Serra | (Oman) Al Faisal Al Zubair (Zimbabwe) Axcil Jefferies (Germany) Fabian Schiller | (Austria) Dominik Baumann (Austria) Martin Konrad (Germany) Valentin Pierburg | (United States) Brendan Iribe (United Kingdom) Ollie Millroy (Denmark) Frederik Schandorff | No Entries | Report |
| 5 | R1 | (Netherlands) Zandvoort | (Belgium) No. 32 Team WRT | (Belgium) No. 32 Team WRT | (Italy) No. 53 AF Corse | (Italy) No. 21 AF Corse | No Entries | No Entries | Report |
| 5 | R1 | (Netherlands) Zandvoort | (Belgium) Dries Vanthoor (Belgium) Charles Weerts | (Belgium) Dries Vanthoor (Belgium) Charles Weerts | (France) Pierre-Alexandre Jean (Belgium) Ulysse De Pauw | (Italy) Stefano Costantini (Monaco) Cedric Sbirrazzuoli | No Entries | No Entries | Report |
| 5 | R2 | (Netherlands) Zandvoort | (France) No. 89 AKKodis ASP Team | (France) No. 89 AKKodis ASP Team | (Germany) No. 99 Attempto Racing | (United Kingdom) No. 188 Garage 59 | No Entries | No Entries | Report |
| 5 | R2 | (Netherlands) Zandvoort | (Fédération Internationale de l'Automobile) Timur Boguslavskiy (Switzerland) Raffaele Marciello | (Fédération Internationale de l'Automobile) Timur Boguslavskiy (Switzerland) Raffaele Marciello | (Germany) Alex Aka (Austria) Nicolas Scholl | (United Kingdom) Dean MacDonald (Portugal) Miguel Ramos | No Entries | No Entries | Report |
| 6 | R1 | (Italy) Misano | (Belgium) No. 32 Team WRT | (Belgium) No. 32 Team WRT | (United Kingdom) No. 30 ROFGO Racing with Team WRT | (United Kingdom) No. 188 Garage 59 | No Entries | No Entries | Report |
| 6 | R1 | (Italy) Misano | (Belgium) Dries Vanthoor (Belgium) Charles Weerts | (Belgium) Dries Vanthoor (Belgium) Charles Weerts | (Denmark) Benjamin Goethe (France) Thomas Neubauer | (United Kingdom) Dean MacDonald (Portugal) Miguel Ramos | No Entries | No Entries | Report |
| 6 | R2 | (Italy) Misano | (Belgium) No. 32 Team WRT | (Belgium) No. 32 Team WRT | (Italy) No. 53 AF Corse | (United Kingdom) No. 188 Garage 59 | No Entries | No Entries | Report |
| 6 | R2 | (Italy) Misano | (Belgium) Dries Vanthoor (Belgium) Charles Weerts | (Belgium) Dries Vanthoor (Belgium) Charles Weerts | (France) Pierre-Alexandre Jean (Belgium) Ulysse De Pauw | (United Kingdom) Dean MacDonald (Portugal) Miguel Ramos | No Entries | No Entries | Report |
| 7 | | (Belgium) Spa-Francorchamps | (France) #88 AMG - Team AKKodis ASP | (France) #88 AMG - Team AKKodis ASP | (United Kingdom) #30 ROFGO Racing with Team WRT | (Italy) #52 AF Corse | (Italy) #83 Iron Dames | (Germany) #20 SPS Automotive Performance | Report |
| 7 | | (Belgium) Spa-Francorchamps | (France) Jules Gounon (Spain) Daniel Juncadella (Switzerland) Raffaele Marciello | (France) Jules Gounon (Spain) Daniel Juncadella (Switzerland) Raffaele Marciello | (Denmark) Benjamin Goethe (France) Thomas Neubauer (France) Jean-Baptiste Simmenauer | (Italy) Andrea Bertolini (Italy) Stefano Costantini (Belgium) Louis Machiels (Italy) Alessio Rovera | (Belgium) Sarah Bovy (Switzerland) Rahel Frey (Denmark) Michelle Gatting (France) Doriane Pin | (Saudi Arabia) Reema Juffali (United States) George Kurtz (Germany) Tim Müller (Germany) Valentin Pierburg | Report |
| 8 | | (Germany) Hockenheimring | (Belgium) #32 Team WRT | (France) #25 Saintéloc Racing | (Switzerland) #14 Emil Frey Racing | (Italy) #52 AF Corse | (United Kingdom) #7 Inception Racing with Optimum Motorsport | No Entries | Report |
| 8 | | (Germany) Hockenheimring | (South Africa) Kelvin van der Linde (Belgium) Dries Vanthoor (Belgium) Charles Weerts | (Switzerland) Lucas Légeret (Germany) Christopher Mies (Switzerland) Patric Niederhauser | (Finland) Konsta Lappalainen (South Africa) Stuart White (Austria) Mick Wishofer | (Italy) Andrea Bertolini (Italy) Stefano Costantini (Belgium) Louis Machiels | (United States) Brendan Iribe (United Kingdom) Ollie Millroy (Denmark) Frederik Schandorff | No Entries | Report |
| 9 | R1 | (Spain) Valencia | (Italy) No. 53 AF Corse | (Italy) No. 53 AF Corse | (Italy) No. 53 AF Corse | (Poland) No. 111 JP Motorsport | No Entries | No Entries | Report |
| 9 | R1 | (Spain) Valencia | (France) Pierre-Alexandre Jean (Belgium) Ulysse De Pauw | (France) Pierre-Alexandre Jean (Belgium) Ulysse De Pauw | (France) Pierre-Alexandre Jean (Belgium) Ulysse De Pauw | (Poland) Patryk Krupiński (Austria) Christian Klien | No Entries | No Entries | Report |
| 9 | R2 | (Spain) Valencia | (France) No. 89 AKKodis ASP Team | (Belgium) No. 32 Team WRT | (Spain) No. 90 Madpanda Motorsport | (Poland) No. 111 JP Motorsport | No Entries | No Entries | Report |
| 9 | R2 | (Spain) Valencia | (Fédération Internationale de l'Automobile) Timur Boguslavskiy (Switzerland) Raffaele Marciello | (Belgium) Dries Vanthoor (Belgium) Charles Weerts | (Argentina) Ezequiel Pérez Companc (Germany) Fabian Schiller | (Poland) Patryk Krupiński (Austria) Christian Klien | No Entries | No Entries | Report |
| 10 | | (Spain) Barcelona | (Italy) #71 Iron Lynx | (Italy) #54 Dinamic Motorsport | (United Kingdom) #30 ROFGO Racing with Team WRT | (Germany) #20 SPS Automotive Performance | (Poland) #112 JP Motorsport | No Entries | Report |
| 10 | | (Spain) Barcelona | (Italy) Antonio Fuoco (Italy) Alessandro Pier Guidi (Italy) Alessio Rovera | (Austria) Klaus Bachler (Italy) Matteo Cairoli (Belgium) Alessio Picariello | (Denmark) Benjamin Goethe (France) Thomas Neubauer (France) Jean-Baptiste Simmenauer | (Austria) Dominik Baumann (United Kingdom) Ian Loggie (Germany) Valentin Pierburg | (Poland) Maciej Błażek (Poland) Patryk Krupiński (Austria) Norbert Siedler | No Entries | Report |

== Championship standings ==
Scoring system

Championship points are awarded for the first ten positions in each race. The pole-sitter also receives one point and entries are required to complete 75% of the winning car's race distance in order to be classified and earn points. Individual drivers are required to participate for a minimum of 25 minutes in order to earn championship points in any race.

Sprint points

| Position | 1st | 2nd | 3rd | 4th | 5th | 6th | 7th | 8th | 9th | 10th | Pole |
| Points | 16.5 | 12 | 9.5 | 7.5 | 6 | 4.5 | 3 | 2 | 1 | 0.5 | 1 |

Imola, Hockenheim & Barcelona points

| Position | 1st | 2nd | 3rd | 4th | 5th | 6th | 7th | 8th | 9th | 10th | Pole |
| Points | 25 | 18 | 15 | 12 | 10 | 8 | 6 | 4 | 2 | 1 | 1 |

Paul Ricard points

| Position | 1st | 2nd | 3rd | 4th | 5th | 6th | 7th | 8th | 9th | 10th | Pole |
| Points | 33 | 24 | 19 | 15 | 12 | 9 | 6 | 4 | 2 | 1 | 1 |

24 Hours of Spa points

Points are awarded after six hours, after twelve hours and at the finish.

| Position | 1st | 2nd | 3rd | 4th | 5th | 6th | 7th | 8th | 9th | 10th | Pole |
| Points after 6hrs/12hrs | 12 | 9 | 7 | 6 | 5 | 4 | 3 | 2 | 1 | 0 | 1 |
| Points at the finish | 25 | 18 | 15 | 12 | 10 | 8 | 6 | 4 | 2 | 1 | 1 |

=== Drivers' Championship ===
==== Overall ====
| Pos. | Drivers | Team | IMO (Italy) | BRH (United Kingdom) | | MAG (France) | | LEC (France) | ZAN (Netherlands) | | MIS (Italy) | | SPA (Belgium) | | | HOC (Germany) | VAL (Spain) | | BAR (Spain) | Points |
| Pos. | Drivers | Team | IMO (Italy) | BRH (United Kingdom) | | MAG (France) | | LEC (France) | ZAN (Netherlands) | | MIS (Italy) | | 6hrs | 12hrs | 24hrs | HOC (Germany) | VAL (Spain) | | BAR (Spain) | Points |
|---|---|---|---|---|---|---|---|---|---|---|---|---|---|---|---|---|---|---|---|---|
| 1 | (Switzerland) Raffaele Marciello | (France) AKKodis ASP Team | 2 | 3^{F} | 1^{PF} | 2^{F} | 1^{PF} | 3^{F} | 23^{F} | 1^{P} | 2^{F} | 2 | | | | | 7 | 3^{P} | | 200.5 |
| 1 | (Switzerland) Raffaele Marciello | (France) AMG - Team AKKodis ASP | | | | | | | | | | | 3 | 3 | 1^{P1} | 40^{†} | | | 5 | 200.5 |
| 2 | (Belgium) Dries Vanthoor (Belgium) Charles Weerts | (Belgium) Team WRT | 1^{P} | 2 | 2 | 1 | 6 | 41 | 1^{P} | 2 | 1^{P} | 1^{PF} | | | | Ret^{P} | 3^{F} | 1 | 4 | 174.5 |
| 2 | (Belgium) Dries Vanthoor (Belgium) Charles Weerts | (Belgium) Audi Sport Team WRT | | | | | | | | | | | 14 | 14 | Ret | | | | | 174.5 |
| 3 | (France) Jules Gounon | (France) AKKodis ASP Team | 2 | 4 | 3 | | | 3^{F} | 2 | 4^{F} | 10 | 6 | | | | | | | | 130.5 |
| 3 | (France) Jules Gounon | (France) AMG Team AKKodis ASP | | | | | | | | | | | 3 | 3 | 1^{P1} | 40^{†} | | | 5 | 130.5 |
| 4 | (Fédération Internationale de l'Automobile) Timur Boguslavskiy | (France) AKKodis ASP Team | | 3^{F} | 1^{PF} | 2^{F} | 1^{PF} | | 23^{F} | 1^{P} | 2^{F} | 2 | | | | | 7 | 3^{P} | | 111.5 |
| 5 | (Spain) Daniel Juncadella | (France) AKKodis ASP Team | 2 | | | | | 3^{F} | | | | | | | | | | | | 89 |
| 5 | (Spain) Daniel Juncadella | (France) AMG Team AKKodis ASP | | | | | | | | | | | 3 | 3 | 1^{P1} | 40^{†} | | | 5 | 89 |
| 6 | (Italy) Antonio Fuoco | (Italy) Iron Lynx | 8 | | | | | 1^{P} | | | | | 2 | 4 | 3 | Ret | | | 2^{P} | 87 |
| 7 | (Switzerland) Patric Niederhauser | (France) Saintéloc Racing | 9 | 5 | 6 | 4 | 3 | Ret | 5 | 7 | Ret | DNS | 16 | 28 | 19 | 1 | 9 | 2 | 7 | 82.5 |
| 8 | (Germany) Christopher Haase | (Italy) Tresor by Car Collection | 4 | 7 | 4 | 3^{P} | Ret | 12 | 3 | Ret | 4 | 3 | | | | 38^{†} | 2 | 4 | 42 | 79 |
| 8 | (Germany) Christopher Haase | (Italy) Audi Sport Team Tresor | | | | | | | | | | | Ret | Ret | Ret | | | | | 79 |
| 9 | (Italy) Davide Rigon | (Italy) Iron Lynx | 8 | | | | | 1^{P} | | | | | 2 | 4 | 3 | Ret | | | | 68 |
| 9 | (Brazil) Daniel Serra | (Italy) Iron Lynx | 8 | | | | | 1^{P} | | | | | 2 | 4 | 3 | | | | | 68 |
| 10 | (France) Simon Gachet | (Italy) Tresor by Car Collection | | 7 | 4 | 3^{P} | Ret | | 3 | Ret | 4 | 3 | | | | | 2 | 4 | | 67 |
| 11 | (France) Pierre-Alexandre Jean | (Italy) AF Corse | | 1^{P} | 5 | 7 | 5 | | 4 | 9 | 8 | 8 | | | | | 1^{P} | 17 | | 62.5 |
| 11 | (France) Pierre-Alexandre Jean | (Italy) Tresor by Car Collection | | | | | | | | | | | 21 | Ret | Ret | | | | | 62.5 |
| 11 | (Belgium) Ulysse de Pauw | (Italy) AF Corse | | 1^{P} | 5 | 7 | 5 | | 4 | 9 | 8 | 8 | | | | | 1^{P} | 17 | | 62.5 |
| 12 | (Germany) Christopher Mies | (France) Saintéloc Racing | 9 | | | | | Ret | | | | | 16 | 28 | 19 | 1 | | | 7 | 55 |
| 12 | (Germany) Christopher Mies | (Belgium) Team WRT | | Ret | 14 | 9 | 4 | | 9 | 23 | 6 | 4 | | | | | 10 | 22 | | 55 |
| 13 | (Austria) Klaus Bachler | (Italy) Dinamic Motorsport | 6 | 22† | 21 | 20 | 18 | Ret | 11 | 19 | 16 | 13 | 6 | Ret | Ret^{2} | 3 | Ret | 19 | 1 | 54 |
| 14 | (France) Jim Pla | (France) AKKodis ASP Team | | 4 | 3 | 10 | 2 | | 2 | 4^{F} | 10 | 6 | | | | | 13 | 12^{F} | | 54 |
| 14 | (France) Jim Pla | (Germany) GetSpeed Performance | | | | | | | | | | | 48 | 41 | 31 | | | | | 54 |
| 15 | (Netherlands) Steijn Schothorst (Germany) Luca Stolz | (Germany) BWT Team GetSpeed Performance | 3 | | | | | Ret | | | | | | | | | | | | 53 |
| 15 | (Netherlands) Steijn Schothorst (Germany) Luca Stolz | (Germany) BWT AMG Team GetSpeed | | | | | | | | | | | 7 | 10 | 2^{3} | 4 | | | 8 | 53 |
| 16 | (France) Aurélien Panis | (France) Saintéloc Racing | 21 | 5 | 6 | 4 | 3 | 20 | 5 | 7 | Ret | DNS | Ret | Ret | Ret | 12 | 9 | 2 | 16 | 49.5 |
| 17 | (Germany) Dennis Marschall | (Germany) Attempto Racing | Ret | 9 | 12 | 13 | 7 | 10 | 6 | 3 | 5 | Ret | | | | 2 | 5 | 11 | Ret | 49 |
| 17 | (Germany) Dennis Marschall | (Germany) Audi Sport Team Attempto | | | | | | | | | | | 36 | 26 | 12 | | | | | 49 |
| 18 | (Italy) Matteo Cairoli | (Italy) Dinamic Motorsport | 6 | | | | | Ret | | | | | | | | 3 | | | 1 | 48 |
| 19 | (Germany) Maro Engel | (Germany) BWT Team GetSpeed Performance | 3 | | | | | Ret | | | | | | | | | | | | 44 |
| 19 | (Germany) Maro Engel | (Hong Kong) AMG Team GruppeM Racing | | | | | | | | | | | 10 | 9 | 4 | | | | | 44 |
| 19 | (Germany) Maro Engel | (Germany) BWT AMG Team GetSpeed | | | | | | | | | | | | | | 4 | | | 8 | 44 |
| 20 | (Belgium) Alessio Picariello | (Switzerland) Porsche Zentrum Oberer Zürichsee by Herberth | | | | | | 27 | | | | | 27 | 20 | 43^{†} | | | | | 40 |
| 20 | (Belgium) Alessio Picariello | (Italy) Dinamic Motorsport | | | | | | | | | | | | | | 3 | | | 1 | 40 |
| 21 | (Italy) Valentino Rossi (Belgium) Frédéric Vervisch | (Italy) Monster VR46 with Team WRT | 17 | 13 | 8 | 15 | 11 | 5 | 14 | 16 | Ret | 5 | 12 | 17 | 17 | 5 | 22 | Ret | 6 | 38 |
| 22 | (Spain) Miguel Molina (Denmark) Nicklas Nielsen | (Italy) Iron Lynx | 7 | | | | | 2 | | | | | 5 | 11 | 9 | 43^{†} | | | 20 | 37 |
| 22 | (United Kingdom) James Calado | (Italy) Iron Lynx | 7 | | | | | 2 | | | | | 5 | 11 | 9 | 43^{†} | | | | 37 |
| 23 | (Switzerland) Lucas Légeret | (France) Saintéloc Racing | 9 | | | | | Ret | | | | | 16 | 28 | 19 | 1 | | | 7 | 36 |
| 23 | (Switzerland) Lucas Légeret | (Belgium) Comtoyou Racing with Saintéloc | | | | | | | | | 7 | 11 | | | | | | | | 36 |
| 24 | (United Kingdom) Daniel Harper (Germany) Max Hesse (United States) Neil Verhagen | (Germany) BMW Junior Team with ROWE Racing | 15 | | | | | 4 | | | | | 11 | 2 | 5 | 9 | | | 13 | 36 |
| 25 | (Spain) Albert Costa | (Switzerland) Emil Frey Racing | 13 | | | | | 6 | | | | | 40 | Ret | Ret | 6^{F} | | | 3 | 35 |
| 25 | (Spain) Albert Costa | (Italy) Imperiale Racing | | | | | | | | | 13 | 7 | | | | | | | | 35 |
| 26 | (Germany) Maximilian Götz | (France) AKKodis ASP Team | | | | 10 | 2 | | | | | | | | | | | | | 34.5 |
| 26 | (Germany) Maximilian Götz | (Germany) BWT AMG Team GetSpeed | | | | | | | | | | | 7 | 10 | 2^{3} | | | | | 34.5 |
| 27 | (Brazil) Augusto Farfus (United Kingdom) Nick Yelloly | (Germany) ROWE Racing | 11 | | | | | 11 | | | | | 1 | 1 | 6 | 11 | | | 9 | 34 |
| 28 | (San Marino) Mattia Drudi | (Italy) Tresor by Car Collection | 4 | 6 | 7 | 5 | 8 | 12 | 8 | 13 | 11 | 21 | | | | 38^{†} | 6 | 13 | 42 | 34 |
| 28 | (Italy) Luca Ghiotto | (Italy) Tresor by Car Collection | 4 | 6 | 7 | 5 | 8 | 12 | 8 | 13 | | | | | | 38^{†} | 6 | 13 | 42 | 34 |
| 29 | (Netherlands) Nicky Catsburg | (Germany) ROWE Racing | 11 | | | | | 11 | | | | | 1 | 1 | 6 | 11 | | | | 32 |
| 30 | (United Kingdom) Jack Aitken (Italy) Mirko Bortolotti | (Switzerland) Emil Frey Racing | 13 | | | | | 6 | | | | | 40 | Ret | Ret | 6^{F} | | | 3 | 32 |
| 31 | (Netherlands) Pieter Schothorst | (Germany) Attempto Racing | | 9 | 12 | 13 | 7 | | 6 | 3 | 5 | Ret | | | | | 5 | 11 | | 30 |
| 32 | (Switzerland) Nico Müller | (Italy) Monster VR46 with Team WRT | 17 | | | | | 5 | | | | | 12 | 17 | 17 | 5 | | | 6 | 30 |
| 33 | (South Africa) Kelvin van der Linde | (Belgium) Team WRT | 1^{P} | | | | | 41 | | | | | | | | Ret^{P} | | | | 27 |
| 33 | (South Africa) Kelvin van der Linde | (Belgium) Audi Sport Team WRT | | | | | | | | | | | 14 | 14 | Ret | | | | | 27 |
| 34 | (France) Jean-Baptiste Simmenauer | (United Kingdom) ROFGO Racing with Team WRT | 14 | | | | | 15 | | | | | 15 | 19 | 13 | 10 | | | 11 | 23 |
| 34 | (France) Jean-Baptiste Simmenauer | (Belgium) Team WRT | | Ret | 14 | 9 | 4 | | 9 | 23 | 6 | 4 | | | | | 10 | 22 | | 23 |
| 35 | (Denmark) Benjamin Goethe (France) Thomas Neubauer | (United Kingdom) ROFGO Racing with Team WRT | 14 | Ret | 16 | 11 | 13 | 15 | 10 | 10 | 3 | 10 | 15 | 19 | 13 | 10 | 4 | 15 | 11 | 19.5 |
| 36 | (Italy) Alessio Rovera | (Italy) AF Corse | | | | | | | | | | | 35 | 29 | 20^{F} | | | | | 19 |
| 36 | (Italy) Alessio Rovera | (Italy) Iron Lynx | | | | | | | | | | | | | | Ret | | | 2^{P} | 19 |
| 36 | (Italy) Alessandro Pier Guidi | (Italy) Iron Lynx | | | | | | | | | | | | | | | | | 2^{P} | 19 |
| 37 | (Germany) Markus Winkelhock | (Germany) Attempto Racing | Ret | | | | | 10 | | | | | | | | 2 | | | Ret | 19 |
| 37 | (Germany) Markus Winkelhock | (Germany) Audi Sport Team Attempto | | | | | | | | | | | 36 | 26 | 12 | | | | | 19 |
| 38 | (Monaco) Vincent Abril (Denmark) Dennis Lind | (Poland) JP Motorsport | 5 | | | | | Ret | Ret | 5 | 14 | 12 | | | | 39^{†} | 17 | 7 | 38 | 19 |
| 39 | (Germany) Kim-Luis Schramm | (Germany) Attempto Racing | | | | | | | | | | | | | | 2 | | | Ret | 18 |
| 40 | (United Kingdom) Casper Stevenson | (France) AKKodis ASP Team | Ret | 8 | 11 | 8 | 12 | 8 | 7 | 14 | 9 | 16 | 54 | 44 | Ret | 16 | 8 | 8 | 22 | 16 |
| 40 | (France) Thomas Drouet | (France) AKKodis ASP Team | | 8 | 11 | 8 | 12 | 8 | 7 | 14 | 9 | 16 | 54 | 44 | Ret | 16 | 8 | 8 | 22 | 16 |
| 41 | (France) Côme Ledogar | (Italy) Dinamic Motorsport | 6 | | | | | Ret | | | | | 6 | Ret | Ret^{2} | | | | | 14 |
| 42 | (Germany) Maximilian Buhk (Canada) Mikaël Grenier | (Hong Kong) AMG Team GruppeM Racing | | | | | | | | | | | 10 | 9 | 4 | | | | | 13 |
| 44 | (Germany) Fabian Schiller | (Oman) Al Manar Racing by HRT | 22 | | | | | 7 | | | | | Ret | Ret | Ret | 13 | | | 15 | 12 |
| 44 | (Germany) Fabian Schiller | (Spain) Madpanda Motorsport | | | | | | | | | | | | | | | Ret | 5 | | 12 |
| 45 | (Norway) Dennis Olsen (United Kingdom) Nick Tandy (Belgium) Laurens Vanthoor | (Hong Kong) KCMG | | | | | | | | | | | 8 | 6 | 7 | | | | | 12 |
| 46 | (United Kingdom) Rob Bell (United Kingdom) Oliver Wilkinson | (United Kingdom) Jota Sport | 10 | 12 | 10 | | | Ret | | | | | 9 | 7 | 8 | Ret | | | 10 | 10.5 |
| 47 | (Austria) Christian Klien | (Poland) JP Motorsport | 5 | 16 | 17 | 21 | 17 | Ret | 18 | Ret | | | | | | 39^{†} | 15 | 16 | 38 | 10 |
| 48 | (Germany) Marvin Kirchhöfer | (United Kingdom) Jota Sport | 10 | | | | | Ret | | | | | 9 | 7 | 8 | Ret | | | 10 | 10 |
| 49 | (Germany) Alex Aka (Austria) Nicolas Schöll | (Germany) Attempto Racing | 16 | 10 | 9 | 14 | 9 | 39 | 12 | 8 | Ret | 9 | 30 | 13 | 15 | 8 | 19 | 20 | 17 | 9.5 |
| 50 | (Belgium) Nicolas Baert | (France) Saintéloc Racing | 21 | | | | | 20 | | | | | Ret | Ret | Ret | 12 | | | 16 | 8.5 |
| 50 | (Belgium) Nicolas Baert | (Belgium) Comtoyou Racing with Saintéloc | | 11 | 18 | 6 | 16 | | 19 | 11 | 7 | 11 | | | | | 12 | 9 | | 8.5 |
| 51 | (Austria) Thomas Preining | (Italy) Dinamic Motorsport | | | | | | | | | | | 6 | Ret | Ret^{2} | | | | | 6 |
| 52 | (Denmark) Michael Christensen (France) Kévin Estre (Austria) Richard Lietz | (United Arab Emirates) GPX Martini Racing | | | | | | | | | | | 4 | Ret | Ret | | | | | 6 |
| 53 | (Belgium) Maxime Martin (Denmark) Marco Sørensen (Denmark) Nicki Thiim | (United Kingdom) Beechdean AMR | 12^{F} | | | | | 13 | | | | | 18 | 5 | 10 | | | | | 6 |
| 54 | (Argentina) Ezequiel Pérez Companc | (Spain) Madpanda Motorsport | Ret | | | | | Ret | | | | | 26 | 23 | 23 | Ret | Ret | 5 | 23 | 6 |
| 55 | (Oman) Al Faisal Al Zubair (Zimbabwe) Axcil Jefferies | (Oman) Al Manar Racing by HRT | 22 | | | | | 7 | | | | | Ret | Ret | Ret | 13 | | | 15 | 6 |
| 55 | (South Africa) Stuart White (Finland) Konsta Lappalainen | (Switzerland) Emil Frey Racing | 28 | | | | | Ret | | | | | 17 | 18 | 16 | 7 | | | 14 | 6 |
| 55 | (Austria) Mick Wishofer | (Switzerland) Emil Frey Racing | | | | | | | | | | | | | | 7 | | | 14 | 6 |
| 56 | (Belgium) Gilles Magnus | (Belgium) Comtoyou Racing with Saintéloc | | 11 | 18 | 6 | 16 | | 19 | 11 | | | | | | | 12 | 9 | | 5.5 |
| 56 | (Belgium) Gilles Magnus | (France) Saintéloc Racing | | | | | | | | | | | Ret | Ret | Ret | | | | | 5.5 |
| 57 | (Belgium) Adrien de Leener (Germany) Christian Engelhart | (Italy) Dinamic Motorsport | | Ret | Ret | 12 | 10 | | 17 | 6 | 12 | Ret | | | | | Ret | 14 | | 5 |
| 58 | (Venezuela) Manuel Maldonado | (United Kingdom) Garage 59 | 20 | 15 | 13 | 16 | 14 | Ret | 13 | 22 | 19 | 20 | 43 | Ret | Ret | 18 | 14 | 6 | 12 | 4.5 |
| 58 | (Denmark) Nicolai Kjærgaard | (United Kingdom) Garage 59 | 20 | | | | | Ret | | | | | 43 | Ret | Ret | 18 | 14 | 6 | 12 | 4.5 |
| 59 | (Germany) Marius Zug | (Germany) Attempto Racing | 16 | | | | | 39 | | | | | 30 | 13 | 15 | 8 | | | 17 | 4 |
| 59 | (Italy) Tommaso Mosca | (France) AKKodis ASP Team | Ret | | | | | 8 | | | | | 54 | 44 | Ret | 16 | | | 22 | 4 |
| 60 | (Italy) Alberto di Folco | (Italy) Imperiale Racing | | | | | | | | | 13 | 7 | | | | | | | | 3 |
| 60 | (Italy) Alberto di Folco | (Italy) Tresor by Car Collection | | | | | | | | | | | 21 | Ret | Ret | | | | | 3 |
| 61 | (Australia) Matt Campbell (France) Mathieu Jaminet (Brazil) Felipe Nasr | (Australia) EMA Motorsport | | | | | | | | | | | 13 | 8 | 22 | | | | | 2 |
| 62 | (United States) Brendan Iribe (United Kingdom) Ollie Millroy (Denmark) Frederik Schandorff | (United Kingdom) Inception Racing with Optimum Motorsport | 38 | | | | | 9 | | | | | 38 | 38 | 27 | 15 | | | 35 | 2 |
| 63 | (Finland) Juuso Puhakka | (Germany) Attempto Racing | Ret | | | | | 10 | | | | | 30 | 13 | 15 | | | | | 1 |
| 64 | (Italy) Eddie Cheever III (United Kingdom) Chris Froggatt | (Hong Kong) Sky - Tempesta with GruppeM Racing | 35 | 17 | 20 | 19 | 15 | Ret | 22 | 17 | 21 | 14 | | | | | | | | 0.5 |
| 64 | (Italy) Eddie Cheever III (United Kingdom) Chris Froggatt | (United Kingdom) Sky - Tempesta Racing by HRT | | | | | | | | | | | 32 | 36 | 26 | 32 | 11 | 10 | 37 | 0.5 |
| - | (Switzerland) Ricardo Feller | (Germany) Audi Sport Team Attempto | | | | | | | | | | | 36 | 26 | 12 | | | | | 0 |
| - | (Switzerland) Ricardo Feller | (Belgium) Team WRT | | | | | | | | | | | | | | | | | 4 (Note: Feller did not receive any points for this race in the official standings.) | 0 |
| - | (Austria) Philipp Eng | (Germany) ROWE Racing | | | | | | | | | | | | | | | | | 9 (Note: Eng did not receive any points for this race in the official standings.) | 0 |
| - | (Italy) Giorgio Roda | (Italy) Dinamic Motorsport | | 22† | 21 | 20 | 18 | | 11 | 19 | 16 | 13 | | | | | Ret | 19 | | 0 |
| - | (Italy) Lorenzo Patrese | (Italy) Tresor by Car Collection | | | | | | | | | 11 | 21 | | | | | | | | 0 |
| - | (Italy) Andrea Caldarelli (Italy) Marco Mapelli (South Africa) Jordan Pepper | (United States) Orange1 K-PAX Racing | | | | | | | | | | | 31 | 22 | 11 | | | | | 0 |
| - | (France) Tristan Vautier | (France) AKKodis ASP Team | | | | | | | | | | | | | | | 13 | 12^{F} | | 0 |
| - | (United Kingdom) Dean MacDonald | (United Kingdom) Garage 59 | | 19 | 22 | 18 | 21 | | Ret | 15 | 17 | 15 | 29 | 24 | 41^{†} | 18 | 20 | 21 | 12 | 0 |
| - | (Romania) Petru Umbrărescu (Poland) Igor Waliłko | (France) AKKodis ASP Team | | 20 | 15 | 17 | 19 | | 21 | 12 | 15 | 22 | | | | | Ret | 18 | | 0 |
| - | (France) César Gazeau | (France) Saintéloc Racing | 21 | | | | | 20 | | | | | Ret | Ret | Ret | 12 | | | 16 | 0 |
| - | (Germany) Jannes Fittje (Australia) Jordan Love (Switzerland) Alain Valente | (Germany) Haupt Racing Team | 37 | | | | | 16 | | | | | 20 | 12 | Ret | Ret | | | 25 | 0 |
| - | (United Kingdom) Frank Bird | (Germany) Haupt Racing Team | | | | | | | | | | | 20 | 12 | Ret | | | | | 0 |
| - | (Canada) Ethan Simioni | (United Kingdom) Garage 59 | | 15 | 13 | 16 | 14 | | 13 | 22 | 19 | 20 | | | | | | | | 0 |
| - | (Italy) Giacomo Altoè (France) Arthur Rougier (France) Léo Roussel | (Switzerland) Emil Frey Racing | Ret | | | | | Ret | | | | | 22 | 15 | 14 | 14 | | | Ret | 0 |
| - | (Monaco) Cedric Sbirrazzuoli | (Italy) AF Corse | | 14 | 23 | 22 | 20 | | 15 | 21 | Ret | DNS | | | | | 16 | 23 | | 0 |
| - | (France) Hugo Delacour | (Italy) AF Corse | | 14 | 23 | 22 | 20 | | | | Ret | DNS | | | | | 16 | 23 | | 0 |
| - | (United Kingdom) Finlay Hutchison (Mexico) Diego Menchaca (United Kingdom) Lewis Proctor | (Belgium) Team WRT | 27 | | | | | 14 | | | | | 59 | 49 | 39 | 37 | | | Ret | 0 |
| - | (Poland) Patryk Krupiński | (Poland) JP Motorsport | | 16 | 17 | 21 | 17 | | 18 | Ret | Ret | Ret | | | | | 15 | 16 | | 0 |
| - | (Portugal) Miguel Ramos | (United Kingdom) Garage 59 | | 19 | 22 | 18 | 21 | | Ret | 15 | 17 | 15 | | | | | 20 | 21 | | 0 |
| - | (Italy) Stefano Costantini | (Italy) AF Corse | | | | | | | 15 | 21 | | | | | | | | | | 0 |
| Pos. | Drivers | Team | IMO (Italy) | BRH (United Kingdom) | | MAG (France) | | LEC (France) | ZAN (Netherlands) | | MIS (Italy) | | 6hrs | 12hrs | 24hrs | HOC (Germany) | VAL (Spain) | | BAR (Spain) | Points |
| Pos. | Drivers | Team | IMO (Italy) | BRH (United Kingdom) | | MAG (France) | | LEC (France) | ZAN (Netherlands) | | MIS (Italy) | | SPA (Belgium) | | | HOC (Germany) | VAL (Spain) | | BAR (Spain) | Points |

Notes:

- † – Entry did not finish the race but was classified, as it completed more than 75% of the race distance.

== See also ==
- 2022 British GT Championship
- 2022 GT World Challenge Europe Endurance Cup
- 2022 GT World Challenge Europe Sprint Cup
- 2022 GT World Challenge Asia
- 2022 GT World Challenge America
- 2022 GT World Challenge Australia
- 2022 Intercontinental GT Challenge
