= Gabriel Aubry (racing driver) =

French former racing driver (b. 1998)

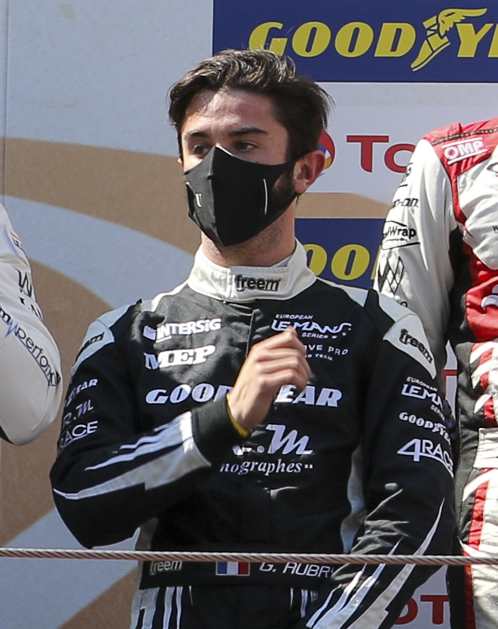
- Aubry in 2021
- Nationality: French
- Born: 3 April 1998 (age 28) Saint-Germain-en-Laye, France

FIA World Endurance Championship
- Categorisation: FIA Silver (until 2019); FIA Gold (2020–)
- Former teams: Jackie Chan DC Racing, Richard Mille Racing Team, Spirit of Race; Vector Sport
- Starts: 29 (29 entries)
- Wins: 3
- Podiums: 11
- Poles: 0
- Fastest laps: 0
- Best finish: 2nd in 2018–19 (LMP2)

Previous series
- 2020 2019–21 2018 2016–17 2016 2015: IMSA - DPi; IMSA - LMP2; GP3 Series; Eurocup Formula Renault 2.0; Formula Renault 2.0 NEC; French F4 Championship

Gabriel Aubry (born 3 April 1998) is a French former racing driver who last competed in the World Endurance Championship for Vector Sport. He is a stalwart of the LMP2 category, having taken a runner-up spot for Jackie Chan DC Racing in the 2018–19 WEC season before competing in the IMSA SportsCar Championship and the European Le Mans Series.

== Early career ==
=== Karting ===
Born in Saint Germain-en-Laye, Aubry began karting in 2008 at the age of eleven, partaking in events across Europe. One of his karting achievements was the third place in the KFJ class of the Andrea Margutti Trophy, when he finished ahead of such drivers as Jehan Daruvala and Lando Norris.

=== Formula 4 ===
In 2015, Aubry graduated to single-seaters. He competed in the French F4 Championship, where he won Hungaroring race and had another nine podium finishes. As a result, he finished in the top-three in the overall standings and as runner-up in the International F4 Championship standings.

=== Formula Renault 2.0 ===
In 2016, Aubry switched to Formula Renault 2.0 with Tech 1 Racing, joining his French F4 rival Sacha Fenestraz. He had six point-scoring finishes and finished eleventh in the drivers' standings. He also had a partial 2016 Formula Renault 2.0 Northern European Cup campaign with the same team.

Aubry continued with Tech 1 in 2017. He won three races—two of them on Hungaroring and one at Spa—and had finished another five races on the podium position. He ended the season fifth. He again competed in the Formula Renault 2.0 Northern European Cup, ending the season fifth as well.

=== GP3 Series ===
Aubry joined Arden International to compete in the GP3 Series in 2018. It proved to be a difficult rookie season, as the French driver scored just two points finishes on his way to 18th in the standings.

== Sportscar career ==
=== FIA World Endurance Championship ===
After making his sportscar debut with two races in the LMP3 class of the 2017–18 Asian Le Mans Series, which included a win at Sepang, Aubry progressed to LMP2 machinery for the WEC's "Super Season", driving alongside Ho-Pin Tung and Stephane Richelmi at Jackie Chan DC Racing. Following a second place at the season-opening Spa round, Aubry made his 24 Hours of Le Mans debut, finishing sixth in class. Thereafter, he and his teammates took three podiums, which included wins at Silverstone and Shanghai, with Aubry being entrusted with the final stint at the latter event. Though the team celebrated two further podium appearances towards the end of the campaign, culminating in a runner-up finihsh at Le Mans, Aubry and his stablemates ended up second in the standings, only behind the Le Mans-winning Signatech Alpine crew. During 2019, Aubry partook in the endurance rounds of the IMSA SportsCar Championship with PR1/Mathiasen Motorsports, winning the 6 Hours of The Glen and helping Matt McMurry to the title.

For the 2019–20 WEC season, Aubry returned to Jackie Chan DC, with him and Tung being joined by Will Stevens. Until the commencement of the COVID-19 pandemic, Aubry and the team were firmly in the title race, having finished on the podium on five occasions. Aubry missed the postponed Spa event due to a positive COVID-19-test, which he had contracted as a result of his dealings in the ELMS driving for Algarve Pro Racing, leaving him unable to be part of the championship picture. A piece of redemption arrived in the final race at Bahrain, where Aubry charged past António Félix da Costa to take the team's final win in the category.

The 2021 campaign saw Aubry join gentleman driver John Farano at Starworks-run Tower Motorsport for the entire IMSA season. In a season where only three teams competed in all rounds, a pair of retirements became the duo's undoing, as they finished third in the standings despite winning the season-ending Petit Le Mans event.

Going into 2022, Aubry transitioned to GT racing, joining Spirit of Race as their pro-ranked driver in the LMGTE Am class of the WEC. The team struggled to achieve results, retiring from two of the opening three races before taking a season-best finish of fifth at Monza, one that left SoR 13th and last of all outfits in the teams' standings. The year also yielded no success in LMP2, as Aubry and bronze-rated Rob Hodes finished seventh and last in the Pro-Am subclass of the ELMS with Team Virage.

Vector Sport became Aubry's new home in 2023, as he moved back to LMP2 on a full-time basis in the WEC. Despite driving alongside two silvers in the form of Matthias Kaiser and Ryan Cullen, the French driver was able to showcase his pace, notably by qualifying second at Portimão, merely 0.001 seconds off polesitter Mirko Bortolotti. He helped the team to finish seventh at Le Mans but got unlucky with a number of technical issues throughout the season, leaving him and Vector tenth overall.

Initially announced as one of Vector Sport's drivers for the 2024 European Le Mans Series campaign, Aubry was released via a phone call one week before pre-season testing to make way for Felipe Drugovich, in a decision the Frenchman described as having shocked him. His only racing appearance of the year came in Portimão, where he joined Nielsen Racing.

== Racing record ==
=== Career summary ===
Season	Series	Team	Races	Wins	Poles	F/Laps	Podiums	Points	Position
2015	French F4 Championship	Auto Sport Academy	21	1	1	4	10	227	**3rd**
2016	Eurocup Formula Renault 2.0	Tech 1 Racing	15	0	0	0	0	35	12th
2016	Formula Renault 2.0 NEC	Tech 1 Racing	9	0	0	0	0	76	18th
2017	Formula Renault Eurocup	Tech 1 Racing	23	3	2	1	8	232	5th
2017	Formula Renault NEC	Tech 1 Racing	9	3	2	1	4	115	5th
2017–18	Asian Le Mans Series - LMP3	Jackie Chan DC Racing X Jota	2	1	0	0	1	37	6th
2018	GP3 Series	Arden International	18	0	0	0	0	5	18th
2018	24 Hours of Le Mans - LMP2	Jackie Chan DC Racing	1	0	0	0	0	N/A	6th
2018	European Le Mans Series - LMP2	IDEC Sport	2	0	0	0	0	14	16th
2018–19	FIA World Endurance Championship - LMP2	Jackie Chan DC Racing	8	3	3	0	6	166	**2nd**
2019	IMSA SportsCar Championship - LMP2	PR1/Mathiasen Motorsports	4	2	2	3	3	130	4th
2019	24 Hours of Le Mans - LMP2	Jackie Chan DC Racing	1	0	0	0	1	N/A	**2nd**
2019–20	FIA World Endurance Championship - LMP2	Jackie Chan DC Racing	7	1	1	0	5	128	7th
2020	European Le Mans Series - LMP2	Algarve Pro Racing	5	0	0	0	0	19.5	12th
2020	IMSA SportsCar Championship - DPi	JDC-Miller MotorSports	2	0	0	0	0	46	22nd
2020	IMSA SportsCar Championship - LMP2	PR1/Mathiasen Motorsports	1	0	1	0	1	0	NC†
2021	IMSA SportsCar Championship - LMP2	Tower Motorsport by Starworks	7	1	0	2	5	2012	**3rd**
2021	European Le Mans Series - LMP2	Panis Racing	1	0	0	0	1	18.5	20th
2021	European Le Mans Series - LMP2	IDEC Sport	1	0	0	0	0	18.5	20th
2021	FIA World Endurance Championship - LMP2	PR1 Motorsports	1	0	0	0	0	0	NC‡
2021	FIA World Endurance Championship - LMP2	Richard Mille Racing Team	1	0	0	0	0	8	23rd
2021	FIA World Endurance Championship - Hypercar	Alpine Elf Matmut	Reserve driver						
2022	FIA World Endurance Championship - LMGTE Am	Spirit of Race	6	0	0	0	0	16	22nd
2022	24 Hours of Le Mans - LMGTE Am	Spirit of Race	1	0	0	0	0	N/A	DNF
2022	European Le Mans Series - LMP2	Team Virage	6	0	0	0	0	0	26th
2023	FIA World Endurance Championship - LMP2	Vector Sport	7	0	0	0	0	29	16th
2023	24 Hours of Le Mans - LMP2	Vector Sport	1	0	0	0	0	N/A	7th
2024	European Le Mans Series - LMP2	Nielsen Racing	1	0	0	0	0	0	25th

^{†} Points only counted towards the Michelin Endurance Cup, and not the overall LMP2 Championship.
^{‡} As Aubry was a guest driver, he was ineligible for championship points.

=== Complete French F4 Championship results ===
(key) (Races in bold indicate pole position) (Races in italics indicate fastest lap)

Year	1	2	3	4	5	6	7	8	9	10	11	12	13	14	15	16	17	18	19	20	21	Pos	Points
2015	LÉD; 1; 4	LÉD; 2; 3	LÉD; 3; 6	LMS; 1; 16	LMS; 2; 16	LMS; 3; 14†	PAU; 1; 3	PAU; 2; 4	PAU; 3; 3	HUN; 1; 10	HUN; 2; 1	HUN; 3; 2	MAG; 1; 3	MAG; 2 Ret	MAG; 3; 2	NAV; 1; 3	NAV; 2; 5	NAV; 3; 3	LEC; 1; 3	LEC; 2; 7	LEC; 3; 4	3rd	227

=== Complete Formula Renault Eurocup results ===
(key) (Races in bold indicate pole position) (Races in italics indicate fastest lap)

Year	Team	1	2	3	4	5	6	7	8	9	10	11	12	13	14	15	16	17	18	19	20	21	22	23	Pos	Points
2016	Tech 1 Racing	ALC; 1 Ret	ALC; 2; 10	ALC; 3; 11	MON; 1; 7	MNZ; 1 Ret	MNZ; 2 Ret	MNZ; 1; 5	RBR; 1; 14	RBR; 2; 12	LEC; 1; 15	LEC; 2; 4	SPA; 1; 6	SPA; 2 Ret	EST; 1 Ret	EST; 2; 15									12th	35
2017	Tech 1 Racing	MNZ; 1; 3	**MNZ**; **2** Ret	SIL; 1; 8	SIL; 2 Ret	PAU; 1; 3	PAU; 2; 7	MON; 1; 7	MON; 2; 7	HUN; 1; 4	HUN; 2; 1	**HUN**; **3**; 1	NÜR; 1; 9	NÜR; 2; 4	RBR; 1; 5	RBR; 2; 3	LEC; 1; 15	LEC; 2; 3	SPA; 1; 6	SPA; 2; 1	SPA; 3; 4	CAT; 1; 3	CAT; 2 Ret	CAT; 3; 6	5th	232

=== Complete Formula Renault 2.0 NEC results ===
(key) (Races in bold indicate pole position) (Races in italics indicate fastest lap)

Year	Entrant	1	2	3	4	5	6	7	8	9	10	11	12	13	14	15	DC	Points
2016	Tech 1 Racing	MNZ; 1; 6	MNZ; 2; 7	SIL; 1	SIL; 2	HUN; 1	HUN; 2	SPA; 1; 11	SPA; 2; 16	ASS; 1	ASS; 2	NÜR; 1; 13	NÜR; 2; 11	HOC; 1 Ret	HOC; 2; 9	HOC; 3; 19	18th	76
2017	Tech 1 Racing	**MNZ**; **1**; 1	**MNZ**; **2**; 1	ASS; 1	ASS; 2	NÜR; 1; 5	NÜR; 2; 2	SPA; 1; 6	SPA; 2; 1	SPA; 3; 4	HOC; 1; 6	HOC; 2 Ret					5th	115

=== Complete GP3 Series results ===
(key) (Races in bold indicate pole position) (Races in italics indicate fastest lap)

Year	Entrant	1	2	3	4	5	6	7	8	9	10	11	12	13	14	15	16	17	18	Pos	Points
2018	Arden International	CAT; FEA; 12	CAT; SPR; Ret	LEC; FEA; 15	LEC; SPR; Ret	RBR; FEA; 16	RBR; SPR; Ret	SIL; FEA; Ret	SIL; SPR; Ret	HUN; FEA; 10	HUN; SPR; 13	SPA; FEA; 13	SPA; SPR; 11	MNZ; FEA; Ret	MNZ; SPR; Ret	SOC; FEA; 11	SOC; SPR; 6	YMC; FEA; 15	YMC; SPR; 14	18th	5

=== Complete FIA World Endurance Championship results ===
(key) (Races in bold indicate pole position) (Races in italics indicate fastest lap)

Year	Entrant	Class	Car	Engine	1	2	3	4	5	6	7	8	Rank	Points
2018–19	Jackie Chan DC Racing	LMP2	Oreca 07	Gibson GK428 4.2 L V8	SPA; 1	LMS; 4	SIL; 1	FUJ; 2	**SHA**; 1	**SEB**; 6	**SPA**; 3	LMS; 2	2nd	166
2019–20	Jackie Chan DC Racing	LMP2	Oreca 07	Gibson GK428 4.2 L V8	SIL; 4	**FUJ**; 2	SHA; 2	BHR; 3	COA; 2	SPA; WD	LMS; DSQ	BHR; 1	7th	128
2021	Richard Mille Racing Team	LMP2	Oreca 07	Gibson GK428 4.2 L V8	SPA	ALG	MNZ	LMS	BHR; 6	BHR			23rd	8
2022	Spirit of Race	LMGTE Am	Ferrari 488 GTE Evo	Ferrari F154CB 3.9 L Turbo V8	SEB; Ret	SPA; 12	LMS; Ret	MNZ; 5	FUJ; 7	BHR; 13			22nd	16
2023	Vector Sport	LMP2	Oreca 07	Gibson GK428 4.2 L V8	SEB; 9	ALG; 11	SPA; Ret	LMS; 5	MNZ; Ret	FUJ; 7	BHR; NC		16th	29

=== Complete 24 Hours of Le Mans results ===
Year	Team	Co-Drivers	Car	Class	Laps	Pos.	Class Pos.
2018	(China) Jackie Chan DC Racing	(China) Ho-Pin Tung (Monaco) Stéphane Richelmi	Oreca 07-Gibson	LMP2	356	10th	6th
2019	(China) Jackie Chan DC Racing	(China) Ho-Pin Tung (Monaco) Stéphane Richelmi	Oreca 07-Gibson	LMP2	367	7th	**2nd**
2020	(China) Jackie Chan DC Racing	(China) Ho-Pin Tung (United Kingdom) Will Stevens	Oreca 07-Gibson	LMP2	141	DSQ	DSQ
2021	(United States) PR1 Motorsports	(United States) Patrick Kelly (Switzerland) Simon Trummer	Oreca 07-Gibson	LMP2; Pro-Am	261	DNF	DNF
2022	(Switzerland) Spirit of Race	(France) Franck Dezoteux (France) Pierre Ragues	Ferrari 488 GTE Evo	GTE; Am	127	DNF	DNF
2023	(United Kingdom) Vector Sport	(Republic of Ireland) Ryan Cullen (Liechtenstein) Matthias Kaiser	Oreca 07-Gibson	LMP2	325	15th	7th

=== Complete European Le Mans Series results ===
Year	Entrant	Class	Chassis	Engine	1	2	3	4	5	6	Rank	Points
2018	IDEC Sport	LMP2	Oreca 07	Gibson GK428 4.2 L V8	LEC	MNZ	RBR	SIL	SPA; 4‡	ALG; 6	16th	14
2020	Algarve Pro Racing	LMP2	Oreca 07	Gibson GK428 4.2 L V8	LEC; 10	SPA; 9	LEC; 5	MNZ; 11	ALG; 8		12th	19.5
2021	Panis Racing	LMP2	Oreca 07	Gibson GK428 4.2 L V8	CAT; 2	RBR					20th	18.5
2021	IDEC Sport	LMP2	Oreca 07	Gibson GK428 4.2 L V8			LEC; 15	MNZ	SPA	ALG	20th	18.5
2022	Team Virage	LMP2	Oreca 07	Gibson GK428 4.2 L V8	LEC; 15	IMO; Ret	MNZ; 15	CAT; 14	SPA; 14	ALG; Ret	26th	0
2022	Team Virage	Pro-Am Cup	Oreca 07	Gibson GK428 4.2 L V8	5	Ret	6	6	6	NC	7th	34
2024	Nielsen Racing	LMP2	Oreca 07	Gibson GK428 4.2 L V8	CAT	LEC	IMO	SPA	MUG	ALG; 11	25th	0

^{‡} Half points awarded as less than 75% of race distance was completed.

=== Complete IMSA SportsCar Championship results ===
(key) (Races in bold indicate pole position; races in italics indicate fastest lap)

Year	Entrant	Class	Make	Engine	1	2	3	4	5	6	7	8	9	Rank	Points
2019	PR1/Mathiasen Motorsports	LMP2	Oreca 07	Gibson GK428 4.2 L V8	DAY; 4	**SEB**; 2	MDO	**WGL**; 1	MOS	ELK	LGA	PET; 1		4th	130
2020	PR1/Mathiasen Motorsports	LMP2	Oreca 07	Gibson GK428 4.2 L V8	**DAY**; 2†		SEB	ELK	ATL					NC†	0†
2020	JDC-Miller MotorSports	DPi	Cadillac DPi-V.R	Cadillac 5.5 L V8		DAY				MDO; 8	PET; 8	LGA	SEB	22nd	46
2021	Tower Motorsport by Starworks	LMP2	Oreca 07	Gibson GK428 4.2 L V8	DAY; 2†	SEB; 3	WGL; 4	WGL; 3	ELK; 2	LGA; 2	PET; 1			3rd	2012

^{†} Points only counted towards the Michelin Endurance Cup, and not the overall LMP2 Championship.
