= Aleksey Korneev =

Russian racing driver (born 1998)

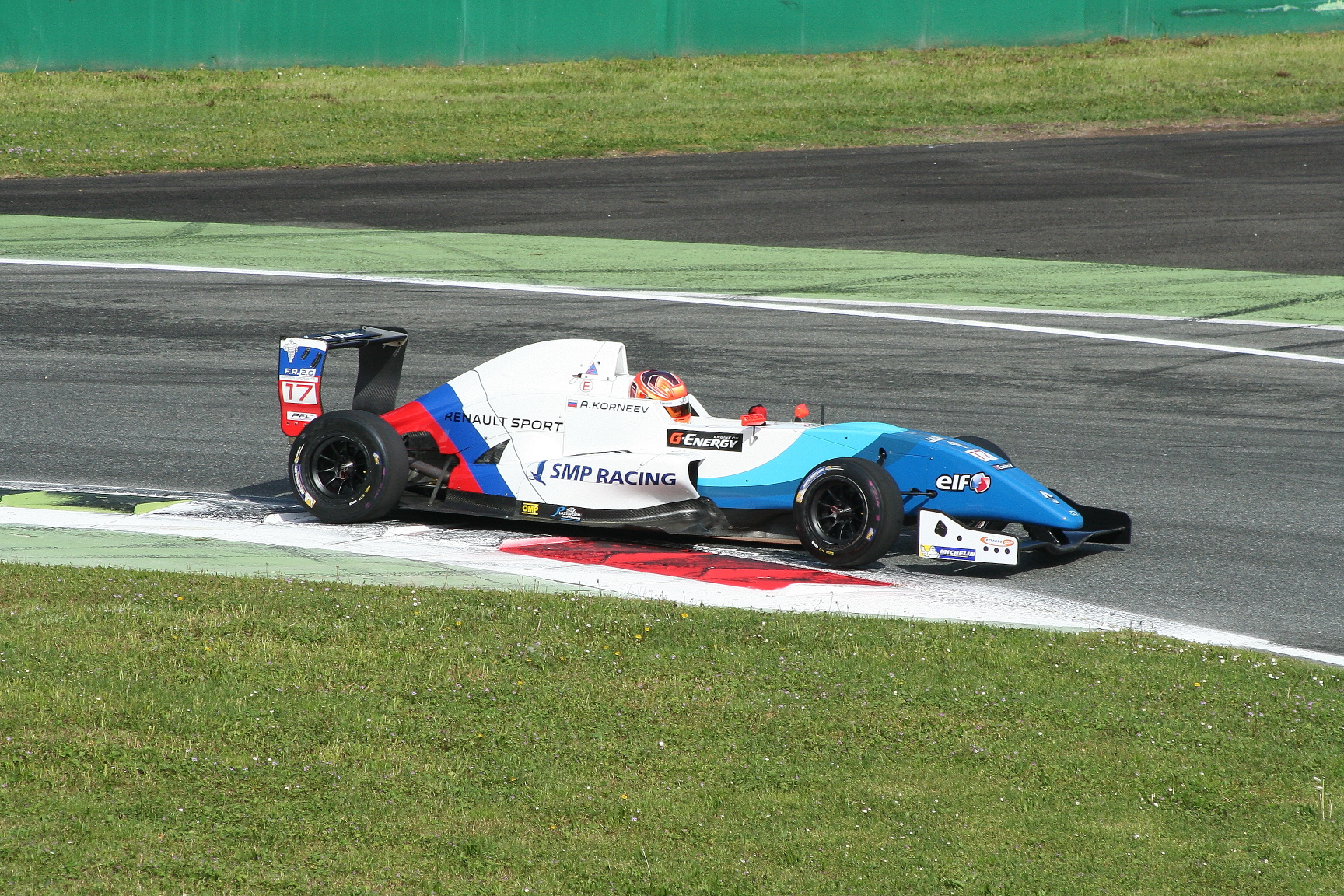
- Nationality: (Russia) Russian
- Born: 27 June 1998 (age 28) Moscow, Russia

Eurocup Formula Renault 2.0 career
- Debut season: 2015
- Current team: Fortec Motorsports
- Categorisation: FIA Silver
- Car number: 18
- Former teams: JD Motorsport
- Starts: 40
- Wins: 0
- Poles: 0
- Fastest laps: 0
- Best finish: 15th in 2016

Previous series
- 2016 2015-16 2015 2015: Formula Renault 2.0 NEC; SMP F4 Championship; French F4 Championship; Formula Renault 2.0 Alps

Aleksey Korneev (born 27 June 1998 in Moscow) is a Russian former racing driver.

== Career ==
=== Karting ===
Korneev began his professional karting career in 2013, competing all across Europe (predominantly in Germany).

=== Lower Formulae ===
In 2015, Korneev graduated to single-seaters in SMP F4. There, he claimed two wins and finished fifth in the overall standings. He returned the following year for eight races.

Korneev also competed in French F4, where he claimed a win and finished 11th in the overall standings.

=== Formula Renault 2.0 ===
Whilst competing in SMP F4, Korneev appeared as guest driver in the final rounds of the Eurocup and Alps championships with JD Motorsport.

In 2016, it was announced Korneev would compete in the sport full-time with JD. He finished 15th in the Eurocup standings and 19th in NEC standings.

Later that year, Korneev switched to Fortec for 2017. He had six point-scoring finishes, and ended season eighteenth, without improving.

== Racing record ==
=== Career summary ===
Season	Series	Team	Races	Wins	Poles	F/Laps	Podiums	Points	Position
2015	SMP F4 Championship	Koiranen GP	21	2	2	1	5	191	5th
2015	French F4 Championship	Auto Sport Academy	12	1	0	3	2	83	11th
2015	Eurocup Formula Renault 2.0	JD Motorsport	3	0	0	0	0	0	NC†
2015	Formula Renault 2.0 Alps	JD Motorsport	4	0	0	0	0	0	NC†
2016	Eurocup Formula Renault 2.0	JD Motorsport	15	0	0	0	0	22	15th
2016	Formula Renault 2.0 NEC	JD Motorsport	11	0	0	0	0	74	19th
2016	SMP F4 Championship	Koiranen GP	8	0	0	1	2	0	NC†
2017	Formula Renault Eurocup	Fortec Motorsports	22	0	0	0	0	8	18th
2017	Formula Renault NEC	Fortec Motorsports	3	0	0	0	0	0	NC†
2018	Blancpain GT Series Sprint Cup	SMP Racing by AKKA ASP	10	0	0	0	0	4	22nd
2018	Blancpain GT Series Sprint Cup - Silver Cup	SMP Racing by AKKA ASP	10	0	0	1	6	80.5	**2nd**
2018	Blancpain GT Series Endurance Cup	SMP Racing by AKKA ASP	1	0	0	0	0	0	NC

^{†} As Korneev was a guest driver, he was ineligible for points.

=== Complete Eurocup Formula Renault 2.0 results ===
(key) (Races in bold indicate pole position; races in italics indicate fastest lap)

Year	Entrant	1	2	3	4	5	6	7	8	9	10	11	12	13	14	15	16	17	18	19	20	21	22	23	DC	Points
2016	JD Motorsport	ALC; 1; 9	ALC; 2; 15	ALC; 3; 8	MON; 1; 18	MNZ; 1; 9	MNZ; 2 Ret	MNZ; 3; 9	RBR; 1; 8	RBR; 2; 9	LEC; 1; 11	LEC; 2; 13	SPA; 1; 12	SPA; 2; 13	EST; 1; 13	EST; 2; 19									15th	22
2017	Fortec Motorsports	MNZ; 1; 20	MNZ; 2; 14	SIL; 1; 14	SIL; 2; 9	PAU; 1; 17	PAU; 2; 14	MON; 1; 9	MON; 2; 10	HUN; 1; 15	HUN; 2; 10	HUN; 3; 11	NÜR; 1; 17	NÜR; 2; 19	RBR; 1; 10	RBR; 2; 14	LEC; 1 DNS	LEC; 2; 23	SPA; 1; 19	SPA; 2; 15	SPA; 3; 21	CAT; 1; 17	CAT; 2; 16	CAT; 3; 10	18th	8

=== Complete Formula Renault 2.0 NEC results ===
(key) (Races in bold indicate pole position) (Races in italics indicate fastest lap)

Year	Entrant	1	2	3	4	5	6	7	8	9	10	11	12	13	14	15	DC	Points
2016	JD Motorsport	MNZ; 1 Ret	MNZ; 2; 15	SIL; 1	SIL; 2	HUN; 1; 7	HUN; 2; 9	SPA; 1 Ret	SPA; 2; 14	ASS; 1	ASS; 2	NÜR; 1; 17	NÜR; 2; 10	HOC; 1 Ret	HOC; 2; 8	HOC; 3; 14	19th	74
2017	Fortec Motorsports	MNZ; 1	MNZ; 2	ASS; 1	ASS; 2	NÜR; 1	NÜR; 2	SPA; 1; 19	SPA; 2; 15	SPA; 3; 21	HOC; 1	HOC; 2					NC†	0

† As Korneev was a guest driver, he was ineligible for points

=== Complete Blancpain GT Series Sprint Cup results ===
Year	Team	Car	Class	1	2	3	4	5	6	7	8	9	10	Pos.	Points
2018	SMP Racing by AKKA ASP	Mercedes-AMG GT3	Silver	ZOL; 1; 16	ZOL; 2; 8	BRH; 1; 18	BRH; 2 Ret	MIS; 1; 12	MIS; 2; 17	HUN; 1; 8	HUN; 2; 18	NÜR; 1; 14	NÜR; 2; 11	2nd	80.5
