= 2018 Blancpain GT Series Sprint Cup =

Car racing competition

The 2018 Blancpain GT Series Sprint Cup was the sixth season of the Blancpain GT Series Sprint Cup following on from the demise of the SRO Motorsports Group's FIA GT1 World Championship (an auto racing series for grand tourer cars), the fifth with the seasons sponsored by Blancpain. The season began on 7 April at Zolder and ended on 16 September at the Nürburgring.

== Calendar ==
At the annual press conference during the 2017 24 Hours of Spa on 28 July, the Stéphane Ratel Organisation announced the first draft of the 2018 calendar. Zolder became the season opener instead of Misano. On 9 October 2017, the finalised calendar was announced, confirming the dates of the races at the Hungaroring.

Race format

In previous years a race weekend consisted of one Qualifying session, one Qualifying Race - of which the results set up the grid for the Main Race - and one Main Race. On 2 October 2017, changes to the format of race weekends were announced. In 2018 a race weekend consisted of two races scoring equal points and featuring separate Qualifying sessions for each race.

Round	Circuit	Date
1	Circuit Zolder, Heusden-Zolder, Belgium	8 April
2	(United Kingdom) Brands Hatch, Kent, Great Britain	6 May
3	Misano World Circuit Marco Simoncelli, Misano Adriatico, Italy	24 June
4	Hungaroring, Mogyoród, Hungary	2 September
5	Nürburgring, Nürburg, Germany	16 September

== Entry list ==
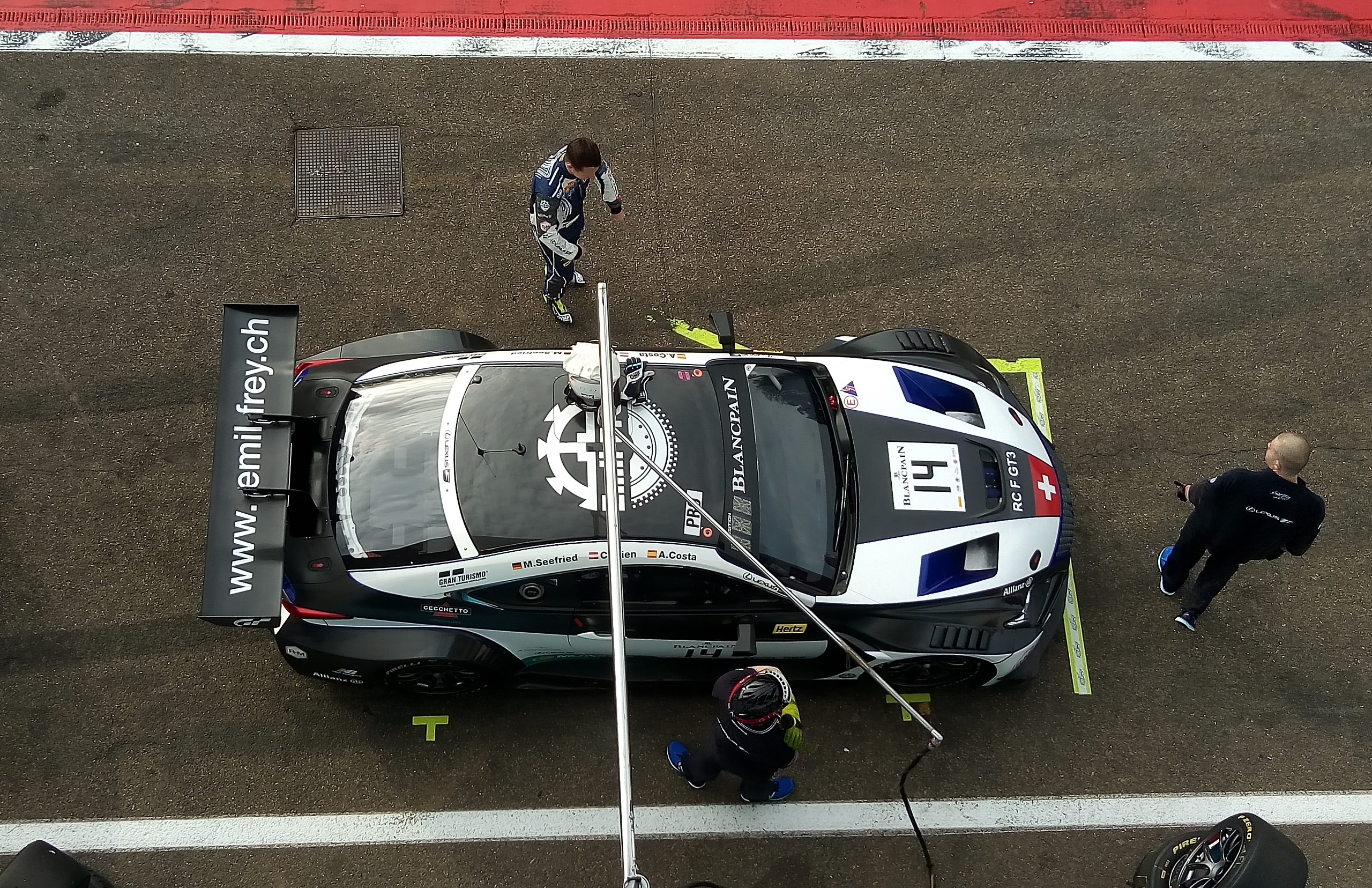
Christian Klien in the pits at Circuit Zolder.

Team	Car	No.	Drivers	Class	Rounds
(Belgium) Belgian Audi Club Team WRT	Audi R8 LMS	1	(Germany) Christopher Mies	P	All
(Belgium) Belgian Audi Club Team WRT	Audi R8 LMS	1	(Spain) Alex Riberas	P	All
(Belgium) Belgian Audi Club Team WRT	Audi R8 LMS	2	(United Kingdom) Will Stevens	P	All
(Belgium) Belgian Audi Club Team WRT	Audi R8 LMS	2	(Belgium) Dries Vanthoor	P	All
(Belgium) Belgian Audi Club Team WRT	Audi R8 LMS	3	(Belgium) Gilles Magnus	S	1
(Belgium) Belgian Audi Club Team WRT	Audi R8 LMS	3	(Belgium) Alessio Picariello	S	1
(Belgium) Belgian Audi Club Team WRT	Audi R8 LMS	3	(Switzerland) Ricardo Feller	S	3–5
(Belgium) Belgian Audi Club Team WRT	Audi R8 LMS	3	(Belgium) Adrien De Leener	S	3–5
(Belgium) Belgian Audi Club Team WRT	Audi R8 LMS	17	(United Kingdom) Stuart Leonard	P	1–2, 4–5
(Belgium) Belgian Audi Club Team WRT	Audi R8 LMS	17	(Netherlands) Robin Frijns	P	1, 4–5
(Belgium) Belgian Audi Club Team WRT	Audi R8 LMS	17	(Belgium) Frédéric Vervisch	P	2
(Belgium) Belgian Audi Club Team WRT	Audi R8 LMS	17	(United Kingdom) Stuart Leonard	S	3
(Belgium) Belgian Audi Club Team WRT	Audi R8 LMS	17	(South Africa) Sheldon van der Linde	S	3
(Germany) Black Falcon	Mercedes-AMG GT3	6	(Germany) Hubert Haupt	S	4–5
(Germany) Black Falcon	Mercedes-AMG GT3	6	(Germany) Luca Stolz	S	4–5
(Switzerland) Kessel Racing (Note: Car No. 11 entered as Kessel Racing under Swiss licence and car No. 39 entered as TP 12 - Kessel Racing under Thai licence.) (Thailand) TP 12 - Kessel Racing	Ferrari 488 GT3	11	(Poland) Michał Broniszewski	PA	1
(Switzerland) Kessel Racing (Thailand) TP 12 - Kessel Racing	Ferrari 488 GT3	11	(Italy) Giacomo Piccini	PA	1
(Switzerland) Kessel Racing (Thailand) TP 12 - Kessel Racing	Ferrari 488 GT3	39	(Thailand) Piti Bhirombhakdi	PA	All
(Switzerland) Kessel Racing (Thailand) TP 12 - Kessel Racing	Ferrari 488 GT3	39	(Netherlands) Carlo van Dam	PA	All
(Switzerland) / Emil Frey Lexus Racing (Note: Cars No. 14 and 114 entered as Emil Frey Lexus Racing and car No. TBA entered as Emil Frey Jaguar Racing.); (Switzerland) / Emil Frey Jaguar Racing	Lexus RC F GT3	14	(Spain) Albert Costa	P	All
(Switzerland) / Emil Frey Lexus Racing; (Switzerland) / Emil Frey Jaguar Racing	Lexus RC F GT3	14	(Austria) Christian Klien	P	All
(Switzerland) / Emil Frey Lexus Racing; (Switzerland) / Emil Frey Jaguar Racing	Emil Frey GT3 Jaguar	54	(Switzerland) Alex Fontana	S	3
(Switzerland) / Emil Frey Lexus Racing; (Switzerland) / Emil Frey Jaguar Racing	Emil Frey GT3 Jaguar	54	(Canada) Mikaël Grenier	S	3
(Switzerland) / Emil Frey Lexus Racing; (Switzerland) / Emil Frey Jaguar Racing	Lexus RC F GT3	114	(Austria) Norbert Siedler	P	All
(Switzerland) / Emil Frey Lexus Racing; (Switzerland) / Emil Frey Jaguar Racing	Lexus RC F GT3	114	(Monaco) Stéphane Ortelli	P	1–3
(Switzerland) / Emil Frey Lexus Racing; (Switzerland) / Emil Frey Jaguar Racing	Lexus RC F GT3	114	(Finland) Markus Palttala	P	4–5
(Belgium) Boutsen Ginion Racing	Lamborghini Gallardo R-EX	15	(France) Pierre Feligioni	Am	1
(Belgium) Boutsen Ginion Racing	Lamborghini Gallardo R-EX	15	(France) Claude-Yves Gosselin	Am	1
(Austria) GRT Grasser Racing Team	Lamborghini Huracán GT3	19	(Italy) Andrea Caldarelli	P	All
(Austria) GRT Grasser Racing Team	Lamborghini Huracán GT3	19	(Argentina) Ezequiel Pérez Companc	P	All
(Austria) GRT Grasser Racing Team	Lamborghini Huracán GT3	63	(Italy) Mirko Bortolotti	P	All
(Austria) GRT Grasser Racing Team	Lamborghini Huracán GT3	63	(Germany) Christian Engelhart	P	All
(Austria) GRT Grasser Racing Team	Lamborghini Huracán GT3	82	(Netherlands) Loris Hezemans	P	1–4
(Austria) GRT Grasser Racing Team	Lamborghini Huracán GT3	82	(France) Franck Perera	P	1–4
Audi Sport Slovakia	Audi R8 LMS	21	(Slovakia) Christian Malchárek	PA	3–4
Audi Sport Slovakia	Audi R8 LMS	21	(Slovakia) Jirko Malchárek	PA	3–4
(France) Saintéloc Racing	Audi R8 LMS	25	(France) Simon Gachet	P	All
(France) Saintéloc Racing	Audi R8 LMS	25	(Germany) Christopher Haase	P	All
(France) Saintéloc Racing	Audi R8 LMS	26	(France) Nyls Stievenart	PA	All
(France) Saintéloc Racing	Audi R8 LMS	26	(Germany) Markus Winkelhock	PA	All
(United Kingdom) Team Parker Racing	Bentley Continental GT3	31	(United Kingdom) Josh Caygill	S	1–3
(United Kingdom) Team Parker Racing	Bentley Continental GT3	31	(Republic of Ireland) Árón Taylor-Smith	S	1–3
(United Kingdom) Team Parker Racing	Bentley Continental GT3	32	(United Kingdom) Ian Loggie	PA	2
(United Kingdom) Team Parker Racing	Bentley Continental GT3	32	(United Kingdom) Callum MacLeod	PA	2
(Russia) SMP Racing by AKKA ASP (Note: Car No. 35 entered as SMP Racing by AKKA ASP under Russian licence. Cars No. 87, 88 and 90 entered as AKKA ASP Team and car No. 751 entered as SunEnergy1 Racing, both under French licence.) (France) AKKA ASP Team (France) SunEnergy1 Racing	Mercedes-AMG GT3	35	(Russia) Vladimir Atoev	S	All
(Russia) SMP Racing by AKKA ASP (France) AKKA ASP Team (France) SunEnergy1 Racing	Mercedes-AMG GT3	35	(Russia) Aleksey Korneev	S	All
(Russia) SMP Racing by AKKA ASP (France) AKKA ASP Team (France) SunEnergy1 Racing	Mercedes-AMG GT3	87	(France) Nico Jamin	P	1–2, 5
(Russia) SMP Racing by AKKA ASP (France) AKKA ASP Team (France) SunEnergy1 Racing	Mercedes-AMG GT3	87	(Puerto Rico) Félix Serrallés	P	1–2
(Russia) SMP Racing by AKKA ASP (France) AKKA ASP Team (France) SunEnergy1 Racing	Mercedes-AMG GT3	87	(United Kingdom) Adam Christodoulou	P	5
(Russia) SMP Racing by AKKA ASP (France) AKKA ASP Team (France) SunEnergy1 Racing	Mercedes-AMG GT3	87	(Russia) Denis Bulatov	S	3–4
(Russia) SMP Racing by AKKA ASP (France) AKKA ASP Team (France) SunEnergy1 Racing	Mercedes-AMG GT3	87	(France) Nico Jamin	S	3–4
(Russia) SMP Racing by AKKA ASP (France) AKKA ASP Team (France) SunEnergy1 Racing	Mercedes-AMG GT3	88	(Italy) Raffaele Marciello	P	All
(Russia) SMP Racing by AKKA ASP (France) AKKA ASP Team (France) SunEnergy1 Racing	Mercedes-AMG GT3	88	(United Kingdom) Michael Meadows	P	All
(Russia) SMP Racing by AKKA ASP (France) AKKA ASP Team (France) SunEnergy1 Racing	Mercedes-AMG GT3	90	(Germany) Nico Bastian	S	All
(Russia) SMP Racing by AKKA ASP (France) AKKA ASP Team (France) SunEnergy1 Racing	Mercedes-AMG GT3	90	(United Kingdom) Jack Manchester	S	All
(Russia) SMP Racing by AKKA ASP (France) AKKA ASP Team (France) SunEnergy1 Racing	Mercedes-AMG GT3	751	(Australia) Kenny Habul	PA	4
(Russia) SMP Racing by AKKA ASP (France) AKKA ASP Team (France) SunEnergy1 Racing	Mercedes-AMG GT3	751	(France) Tristan Vautier	PA	4
(France) 3Y Technology	BMW M6 GT3	37	(Brazil) Lukas Moraes	S	All
(France) 3Y Technology	BMW M6 GT3	37	(United Kingdom) Andrew Watson	S	1–4
(France) 3Y Technology	BMW M6 GT3	37	(Belgium) Denis Dupont	S	5
(Germany) Attempto Racing	Audi R8 LMS	55	(Germany) Pierre Kaffer	P	All
(Germany) Attempto Racing	Audi R8 LMS	55	(Netherlands) Pieter Schothorst	P	All
(Germany) Attempto Racing	Audi R8 LMS	66	(South Africa) Kelvin van der Linde	P	All
(Germany) Attempto Racing	Audi R8 LMS	66	(Netherlands) Steijn Schothorst	P	All
(Germany) Rinaldi Racing	Ferrari 488 GT3	333	(South Africa) David Perel	PA	5
(Germany) Rinaldi Racing	Ferrari 488 GT3	333	(Russia) Rinat Salikhov	PA	5

Icon	Class
P	Pro Cup
S	Silver Cup
PA	Pro-Am Cup
Am	Am Cup

== Race results ==
Bold indicates overall winner.

Round		Circuit	Pole position	Pro Winners	Silver Winners	Pro-Am Winners	Am Winners
1	R1	(Belgium) Zolder	(Belgium) No. 2 Belgian Audi Club Team WRT	**(Austria) No. 63 GRT Grasser Racing Team**	(Belgium) No. 3 Belgian Audi Club Team WRT	(Thailand) No. 39 TP 12 - Kessel Racing	(Belgium) No. 15 Boutsen Ginion Racing
1	R1	(Belgium) Zolder	(United Kingdom) Will Stevens (Belgium) Dries Vanthoor	**(Italy) Mirko Bortolotti** **(Germany) Christian Engelhart**	(Belgium) Gilles Magnus (Belgium) Alessio Picariello	(Thailand) Piti Bhirombhakdi (Netherlands) Carlo van Dam	(France) Pierre Feligioni (France) Claude-Yves Gosselin
1	R2	(Belgium) Zolder	(Austria) No. 63 GRT Grasser Racing Team	**(Germany) No. 66 Attempto Racing**	(Belgium) No. 3 Belgian Audi Club Team WRT	(Thailand) No. 39 TP 12 - Kessel Racing	(Belgium) No. 15 Boutsen Ginion Racing
1	R2	(Belgium) Zolder	(Italy) Mirko Bortolotti (Germany) Christian Engelhart	**(South Africa) Kelvin van der Linde** **(Netherlands) Steijn Schothorst**	(Belgium) Gilles Magnus (Belgium) Alessio Picariello	(Thailand) Piti Bhirombhakdi (Netherlands) Carlo van Dam	(France) Pierre Feligioni (France) Claude-Yves Gosselin
2	R1	(United Kingdom) Brands Hatch	(Belgium) No. 2 Belgian Audi Club Team WRT	**(Belgium) No. 2 Belgian Audi Club Team WRT**	(United Kingdom) No. 31 Team Parker Racing	(Thailand) No. 39 TP 12 - Kessel Racing	No entries
2	R1	(United Kingdom) Brands Hatch	(United Kingdom) Will Stevens (Belgium) Dries Vanthoor	**(United Kingdom) Will Stevens** **(Belgium) Dries Vanthoor**	(United Kingdom) Josh Caygill (Republic of Ireland) Árón Taylor-Smith	(Thailand) Piti Bhirombhakdi (Netherlands) Carlo van Dam	No entries
2	R2	(United Kingdom) Brands Hatch	(Belgium) No. 17 Belgian Audi Club Team WRT	**(Belgium) No. 17 Belgian Audi Club Team WRT**	(France) No. 37 3Y Technology	(France) No. 26 Saintéloc Racing	No entries
2	R2	(United Kingdom) Brands Hatch	(United Kingdom) Stuart Leonard (Belgium) Frédéric Vervisch	**(United Kingdom) Stuart Leonard** **(Belgium) Frédéric Vervisch**	(Brazil) Lukas Moraes (United Kingdom) Andrew Watson	(France) Nyls Stievenart (Germany) Markus Winkelhock	No entries
3	R1	(Italy) Misano	(France) No. 87 AKKA ASP Team	**(Belgium) No. 1 Belgian Audi Club Team WRT**	(France) No. 90 AKKA ASP Team	(France) No. 26 Saintéloc Racing	No entries
3	R1	(Italy) Misano	(Russia) Denis Bulatov (France) Nico Jamin	**(Germany) Christopher Mies** **(Spain) Alex Riberas**	(Germany) Nico Bastian (United Kingdom) Jack Manchester	(France) Nyls Stievenart (Germany) Markus Winkelhock	No entries
3	R2	(Italy) Misano	(France) No. 88 AKKA ASP Team	**(Belgium) No. 1 Belgian Audi Club Team WRT**	(France) No. 87 AKKA ASP Team	(France) No. 26 Saintéloc Racing	No entries
3	R2	(Italy) Misano	(Italy) Raffaele Marciello (United Kingdom) Michael Meadows	**(Germany) Christopher Mies** **(Spain) Alex Riberas**	(Russia) Denis Bulatov (France) Nico Jamin	(France) Nyls Stievenart (Germany) Markus Winkelhock	No entries
4	R1	(Hungary) Hungaroring	(France) No. 90 AKKA ASP Team	**(Austria) No. 63 GRT Grasser Racing Team**	(France) No. 87 AKKA ASP Team	(France) No. 751 SunEnergy1 Racing	No entries
4	R1	(Hungary) Hungaroring	(Germany) Nico Bastian (United Kingdom) Jack Manchester	**(Italy) Mirko Bortolotti** **(Germany) Christian Engelhart**	(Russia) Denis Bulatov (France) Nico Jamin	(Australia) Kenny Habul (France) Tristan Vautier	No entries
4	R2	(Hungary) Hungaroring	(France) No. 88 AKKA ASP Team	**(France) No. 88 AKKA ASP Team**	(France) No. 87 AKKA ASP Team	(France) No. 26 Saintéloc Racing	No entries
4	R2	(Hungary) Hungaroring	(Italy) Raffaele Marciello (United Kingdom) Michael Meadows	**(Italy) Raffaele Marciello** **(United Kingdom) Michael Meadows**	(Russia) Denis Bulatov (France) Nico Jamin	(France) Nyls Stievenart (Germany) Markus Winkelhock	No entries
5	R1	(Germany) Nürburgring	(Austria) No. 63 GRT Grasser Racing Team	**(Belgium) No. 1 Belgian Audi Club Team WRT**	(Belgium) No. 3 Belgian Audi Club Team WRT	(France) No. 26 Saintéloc Racing	No entries
5	R1	(Germany) Nürburgring	(Italy) Mirko Bortolotti (Germany) Christian Engelhart	**(Germany) Christopher Mies** **(Spain) Alex Riberas**	(Switzerland) Ricardo Feller (Belgium) Adrien De Leener	(France) Nyls Stievenart (Germany) Markus Winkelhock	No entries
5	R2	(Germany) Nürburgring	(Germany) No. 6 Black Falcon	**(France) No. 88 AKKA ASP Team**	(Germany) No. 6 Black Falcon	(Germany) No. 333 Rinaldi Racing	No entries
5	R2	(Germany) Nürburgring	(Germany) Hubert Haupt (Germany) Luca Stolz	**(Italy) Raffaele Marciello** **(United Kingdom) Michael Meadows**	(Germany) Hubert Haupt (Germany) Luca Stolz	(South Africa) David Perel (Russia) Rinat Salikhov	No entries

== Championship standings ==
Scoring system

Championship points were awarded for the first ten positions in each race. The pole-sitter also received one point and entries were required to complete 75% of the winning car's race distance in order to be classified and earn points. Individual drivers were required to participate for a minimum of 25 minutes in order to earn championship points in any race. A new points system was introduced this season. It takes the maximum points an entry could earn in the old 'Qualifying Race + Main Race'-format divided by two.

Position	**1st**	**2nd**	**3rd**	**4th**	**5th**	**6th**	**7th**	**8th**	**9th**	**10th**	**Pole**
Points	16.5	12	9.5	7.5	6	4.5	3	2	1	0.5	1

=== Drivers' championships ===
==== Overall ====
Pos.	Driver	Team	ZOL (Belgium)		BRH (United Kingdom)		MIS (Italy)		HUN (Hungary)		NÜR (Germany)		Points
1	(Italy) Raffaele Marciello (United Kingdom) Michael Meadows	(France) AKKA ASP Team	8	2	3	4	2	**10**	2	**1**	4	1	98
2	(Germany) Christopher Mies (Spain) Alex Riberas	(Belgium) Belgian Audi Club Team WRT	3	Ret	2	2	1	1	Ret	4	1	16	90.5
3	(South Africa) Kelvin van der Linde (Netherlands) Steijn Schothorst	(Germany) Attempto Racing	4	1	8	3	Ret	4	10	3	6	4	65
4	(United Kingdom) Will Stevens (Belgium) Dries Vanthoor	(Belgium) Belgian Audi Club Team WRT	**2**	11	**1**	Ret	Ret	2	5	7	2	Ret	63.5
5	(Italy) Mirko Bortolotti (Germany) Christian Engelhart	(Austria) GRT Grasser Racing Team	1	**7**	10	5	3	18	1	6	**DSQ**	EX	57.5
6	(France) Nico Jamin	(France) AKKA ASP Team	9	4	5	6	**Ret**	5	3	8	7	6	45
7	(United Kingdom) Stuart Leonard	(Belgium) Belgian Audi Club Team WRT	5	5	4	**1**	8	6	Ret	16	11	9	44.5
8	(France) Simon Gachet (Germany) Christopher Haase	(France) Saintéloc Racing	10	12	7	8	Ret	3	4	2	10	3	44.5
9	(Italy) Andrea Caldarelli (Argentina) Ezequiel Pérez Companc	(Austria) GRT Grasser Racing Team	6	3	12	Ret	4	20	16	11	3	5	37
10	(Belgium) Frédéric Vervisch	(Belgium) Belgian Audi Club Team WRT			4	**1**							25
11	(Puerto Rico) Félix Serrallés	(France) AKKA ASP Team	9	4	5	6							19
12	(Russia) Denis Bulatov	(France) AKKA ASP Team					**Ret**	5	3	8			18.5
13	(Spain) Albert Costa (Austria) Christian Klien	(Switzerland) Emil Frey Lexus Racing	Ret	20	11	14	9	Ret	6	13	5	7	15.5
14	(Germany) Hubert Haupt (Germany) Luca Stolz	(Germany) Black Falcon							9	12	15	**2**	14
15	(Netherlands) Robin Frijns	(Belgium) Belgian Audi Club Team WRT	5	5					Ret	16	11	9	13
16	(Austria) Norbert Siedler	(Switzerland) Emil Frey Lexus Racing	14	13	9	9	5	8	11	14	9	8	13
17	(Netherlands) Loris Hezemans (France) Franck Perera	(Austria) GRT Grasser Racing Team	20	Ret	13	7	17	7	13	5			12
18	(Germany) Nico Bastian (United Kingdom) Jack Manchester	(France) AKKA ASP Team	11	9	19	15	6	15	**7**	9	16	17	10.5
19	(Monaco) Stéphane Ortelli	(Switzerland) Emil Frey Lexus Racing	14	13	9	9	5	8					10
20	(Belgium) Gilles Magnus (Belgium) Alessio Picariello	(Belgium) Belgian Audi Club Team WRT	7	6									7.5
20	(United Kingdom) Adam Christodoulou	(France) AKKA ASP Team									7	6	7.5
21	(Germany) Pierre Kaffer (Netherlands) Pieter Schothorst	(Germany) Attempto Racing	Ret	14	6	12	Ret	12	12	17	8	12	6.5
21	(South Africa) Sheldon van der Linde	(Belgium) Belgian Audi Club Team WRT					8	6					6.5
22	(Russia) Vladimir Atoev (Russia) Aleksey Korneev	(Russia) SMP Racing by AKKA ASP	16	8	18	Ret	12	17	8	18	14	11	4
23	(Switzerland) Alex Fontana (Canada) Mikaël Grenier	(Switzerland) Emil Frey Jaguar Racing					7	11					3
24	(Finland) Markus Palttala	(Switzerland) Emil Frey Lexus Racing							11	14	9	8	3
25	(France) Nyls Stievenart (Germany) Markus Winkelhock	(France) Saintéloc Racing	15	15	17	11	11	9	18	19	12	15	1
26	(Switzerland) Ricardo Feller (Belgium) Adrien De Leener	(Belgium) Belgian Audi Club Team WRT					10	13	14	10	13	Ret	1
27	(Thailand) Piti Bhirombhakdi (Netherlands) Carlo van Dam	(Thailand) TP 12 - Kessel Racing	12	10	14	13	13	14	17	21	Ret	13	0.5
27	(Brazil) Lukas Moraes	(France) 3Y Technology	17	17	DSQ	10	14	16	20	15	Ret	14	0.5
27	(United Kingdom) Andrew Watson	(France) 3Y Technology	17	17	DSQ	10	14	16	20	15			0.5
27	(South Africa) David Perel (Russia) Rinat Salikhov	(Germany) Rinaldi Racing									Ret	10	0.5
	(Poland) Michał Broniszewski (Italy) Giacomo Piccini	(Switzerland) Kessel Racing	13	18									0
	(Belgium) Denis Dupont	(France) 3Y Technology									Ret	14	0
	(United Kingdom) Josh Caygill (Republic of Ireland) Árón Taylor-Smith	(United Kingdom) Team Parker Racing	18	16	15	Ret	15	Ret					0
	(Australia) Kenny Habul (France) Tristan Vautier	(France) SunEnergy1 Racing							15	DNS			0
	(Slovakia) Christian Malchárek (Slovakia) Jirko Malchárek	Audi Sport Slovakia					16	19	19	20			0
	(United Kingdom) Ian Loggie (United Kingdom) Callum MacLeod	(United Kingdom) Team Parker Racing			16	Ret							0
	(France) Pierre Feligioni (France) Claude-Yves Gosselin	(Belgium) Boutsen Ginion Racing	19	19									0
Pos.	Driver	Team	ZOL (Belgium)		BRH (United Kingdom)		MIS (Italy)		HUN (Hungary)		NÜR (Germany)		Points

Key
Colour	Result
Gold	Race winner
Silver	2nd place
Bronze	3rd place
Green	Points finish
Blue	Non-points finish
Blue	Non-classified finish (NC)
Purple	Did not finish (Ret)
Black	Disqualified (DSQ)
Black	Excluded (EX)
White	Did not start (DNS)
White	Race cancelled (C)
White	Withdrew (WD)
Blank	Did not participate

**Bold** – Pole
Italics – Fastest Lap

==== Silver Cup ====
Pos.	Driver	Team	ZOL (Belgium)		BRH (United Kingdom)		MIS (Italy)		HUN (Hungary)		NÜR (Germany)		Points
1	(Germany) Nico Bastian (United Kingdom) Jack Manchester	(France) AKKA ASP Team	11	9	**19**	**15**	6	15	**7**	9	**16**	17	108.5
2	(Russia) Vladimir Atoev (Russia) Aleksey Korneev	(Russia) SMP Racing by AKKA ASP	16	8	18	Ret	12	17	8	18	14	11	80.5
3	(Brazil) Lukas Moraes	(France) 3Y Technology	17	17	DSQ	10	14	16	20	15	Ret	14	59
4	(Russia) Denis Bulatov (France) Nico Jamin	(France) AKKA ASP Team					**Ret**	5	3	8			50.5
5	(United Kingdom) Andrew Watson	(France) 3Y Technology	17	17	DSQ	10	14	16	20	15			49.5
6	(Switzerland) Ricardo Feller (Belgium) Adrien De Leener	(Belgium) Belgian Audi Club Team WRT					10	13	14	10	13	Ret	47
7	(Germany) Hubert Haupt (Germany) Luca Stolz	(Germany) Black Falcon							9	**12**	15	**2**	43
8	(Belgium) Gilles Magnus (Belgium) Alessio Picariello	(Belgium) Belgian Audi Club Team WRT	**7**	**6**									35
9	(United Kingdom) Josh Caygill (Republic of Ireland) Árón Taylor-Smith	(United Kingdom) Team Parker Racing	18	16	15	Ret	15	Ret					33
10	(United Kingdom) Stuart Leonard (South Africa) Sheldon van der Linde	(Belgium) Belgian Audi Club Team WRT					8	**6**					22.5
11	(Switzerland) Alex Fontana (Canada) Mikaël Grenier	(Switzerland) Emil Frey Jaguar Racing					7	11					21.5
12	(Belgium) Denis Dupont	(France) 3Y Technology									Ret	14	9.5
Pos.	Driver	Team	ZOL (Belgium)		BRH (United Kingdom)		MIS (Italy)		HUN (Hungary)		NÜR (Germany)		Points

==== Pro-Am Cup ====
Pos.	Driver	Team	ZOL (Belgium)		BRH (United Kingdom)		MIS (Italy)		HUN (Hungary)		NÜR (Germany)		Points
1	(France) Nyls Stievenart (Germany) Markus Winkelhock	(France) Saintéloc Racing	15	15	17	**11**	11	**9**	18	19	12	15	134.5
2	(Thailand) Piti Bhirombhakdi (Netherlands) Carlo van Dam	(Thailand) TP 12 - Kessel Racing	**12**	**10**	**14**	13	13	14	**17**	**21**	**Ret**	**13**	126
3	(Slovakia) Christian Malchárek (Slovakia) Jirko Malchárek	Audi Sport Slovakia					**16**	19	19	20			39.5
4	(Poland) Michał Broniszewski (Italy) Giacomo Piccini	(Switzerland) Kessel Racing	13	18									21.5
5	(South Africa) David Perel (Russia) Rinat Salikhov	(Germany) Rinaldi Racing									Ret	10	16.5
5	(Australia) Kenny Habul (France) Tristan Vautier	(France) SunEnergy1 Racing							15	DNS			16.5
6	(United Kingdom) Ian Loggie (United Kingdom) Callum MacLeod	(United Kingdom) Team Parker Racing			16	Ret							12
Pos.	Driver	Team	ZOL (Belgium)		BRH (United Kingdom)		MIS (Italy)		HUN (Hungary)		NÜR (Germany)		Points

==== Am Cup ====
Pos.	Driver	Team	ZOL (Belgium)		BRH (United Kingdom)	MIS (Italy)	HUN (Hungary)	NÜR (Germany)	Points
1	(France) Pierre Feligioni (France) Claude-Yves Gosselin	(Belgium) Boutsen Ginion Racing	**19**	**19**					35
Pos.	Driver	Team	ZOL (Belgium)		BRH (United Kingdom)	MIS (Italy)	HUN (Hungary)	NÜR (Germany)	Points

=== Teams' championships ===
==== Overall ====
Pos.	Team	Manufacturer	ZOL (Belgium)		BRH (United Kingdom)		MIS (Italy)		HUN (Hungary)		NÜR (Germany)		Points
1	(Belgium) Belgian Audi Club Team WRT	Audi	**2**	5	**1**	**1**	1	1	5	4	1	9	123
2	(France) AKKA ASP Team (Russia) SMP Racing by AKKA ASP (France) SunEnergy1 Racing	Mercedes-AMG	8	2	3	4	**2**	**5**	**2**	**1**	4	1	119
3	(Austria) GRT Grasser Racing Team	Lamborghini	1	**3**	10	5	3	7	1	5	**3**	5	95
4	(Germany) Attempto Racing	Audi	4	1	6	3	Ret	4	10	3	6	4	83
5	(France) Saintéloc Racing	Audi	10	12	7	8	11	3	4	2	10	3	77.5
6	(Switzerland) Emil Frey Jaguar/Lexus Racing	Jaguar; Lexus	14	13	9	9	5	8	6	13	5	7	50.5
7	(Switzerland) (Thailand) (TP 12 -) Kessel Racing	Ferrari	12	10	14	13	13	14	17	21	Ret	13	26.5
8	(Germany) Black Falcon	Mercedes-AMG							9	12	15	**2**	25
9	(France) 3Y Technology	BMW	17	17	DSQ	10	14	16	20	15	Ret	14	14
10	(United Kingdom) Team Parker Racing	Bentley	18	16	15	Ret	16	Ret					7
11	Audi Sport Slovakia	Audi					16	19	19	20			4
12	(Germany) Rinaldi Racing	Ferrari									Ret	10	2
13	(Belgium) Boutsen Ginion Racing	Lamborghini	19	19									1
Pos.	Team	Manufacturer	ZOL (Belgium)		BRH (United Kingdom)		MIS (Italy)		HUN (Hungary)		NÜR (Germany)		Points

==== Pro-Am Cup ====
Pos.	Team	Manufacturer	ZOL (Belgium)		BRH (United Kingdom)		MIS (Italy)		HUN (Hungary)		NÜR (Germany)		Points
1	(France) Saintéloc Racing	Audi	15	15	17	**11**	11	**9**	18	19	12	15	137
2	(Switzerland) (Thailand) (TP 12 -) Kessel Racing	Ferrari	**12**	**10**	**14**	13	13	14	**17**	**21**	**Ret**	**13**	126
3	Audi Sport Slovakia	Audi					**16**	19	19	20			39.5
4	(Germany) Rinaldi Racing	Ferrari									Ret	10	16.5
4	(France) SunEnergy1 Racing	Mercedes-AMG							15	DNS			16.5
5	(United Kingdom) Team Parker Racing	Bentley			16	Ret							12
Pos.	Team	Manufacturer	ZOL (Belgium)		BRH (United Kingdom)		MIS (Italy)		HUN (Hungary)		NÜR (Germany)		Points

==== Am Cup ====
Pos.	Team	Manufacturer	ZOL (Belgium)		BRH (United Kingdom)	MIS (Italy)	HUN (Hungary)	NÜR (Germany)	Points
1	(Belgium) Boutsen Ginion Racing	Lamborghini	**19**	**19**					35
Pos.	Team	Manufacturer	ZOL (Belgium)		BRH (United Kingdom)	MIS (Italy)	HUN (Hungary)	NÜR (Germany)	Points

== See also ==
- 2018 GT Series
- 2018 GT Series Endurance Cup
- 2018 GT Series Asia
