= 2019 Japanese Formula 3 Championship =

The Japanese Formula 3 Championship is the 41st Japanese Formula 3 Championship season.

In August 2019, Japan Race Promotion, the series promoter, surrendered the right to organise a Japanese Formula 3 championship at the end of the season by choosing to deviate from the Formula Regional class and go to a Euroformula Open Championship-based formula, which will require the renaming of the series as Super Formula Lights from 2020 season onwards. The FIA responded on 26 December 2019 by awarding the rights to organise a Formula Regional championship (as it will be renamed) to rival promoter K2, which promotes the F4 Japanese Championship. Their series, the Formula Regional Japanese Championship, is the legal successor series under FIA standards and be the FIA-approved and JAF-sanctioned regional Formula 3 championship in 2020.

== Teams and drivers ==
For the 2019 season, the National class was replaced by the Master class, aimed at older drivers not on the FIA Single Seater Pyramid.

Team	Chassis	Engine	No.	Driver	Status	Rounds
Toda Racing	Dallara F319	Toda TR-F301	2	(Japan) Toshiki Oyu		All
Hanashima Racing	Dallara F315	Toyota TOM's TAZ31	5	(Japan) Katsuaki Kubota	M	1–4, 7
Hanashima Racing	Dallara F315	Toyota TOM's TAZ31	5	(Japan) Hiroki Kokuzawa		5
OIRC team YTB	Dallara F317	Volkswagen A41	7	(France) Charles Milesi		1–5, 7–8
OIRC team YTB	Dallara F317	Volkswagen A41	7	(Belgium) Esteban Muth		6
OIRC team YTB	Dallara F315	Volkswagen A41	8	(Japan) Yoshiaki Katayama		All
B-Max Racing with Motopark	Dallara F314	Volkswagen A41	11	(France) Sacha Fenestraz		All
B-Max Racing with Motopark	Dallara F312	Volkswagen A41	28	(United Kingdom) Harrison Newey		6
B-Max Racing with Motopark	Dallara F314	Volkswagen A41	30	(Japan) "Dragon"	M	All
B-Max Racing with Motopark	Dallara F316	Volkswagen A41	50	(Japan) Ukyo Sasahara		7
B-Max Racing with Motopark	Dallara F316	Volkswagen A41	50	(Japan) Takashi Hata		8
B-Max Racing with Motopark	Dallara F315	Volkswagen A41	51	(India) Ameya Vaidyanathan		All
B-Max Racing with Motopark	Dallara F312	Volkswagen A41	65	(United Kingdom) Enaam Ahmed		All
ThreeBond Racing	Dallara F318	ThreeBond Tomei TB14F3	12	(Japan) Hiroki Otsu		All
ThreeBond Racing	Dallara F314	ThreeBond Tomei TB14F3	13	(Japan) Ai Miura		All
Tairoku Racing	Dallara F315	Volkswagen A41	28	(Japan) Tairoku Yamaguchi	M	1–5
RS Fine	Dallara F318	Mercedes 414	35	(Japan) Shunsuke Kohno		All
Corolla Chukyo Kuo TOM'S	Dallara F317	Toyota TOM's TAZ31	36	(Japan) Ritomo Miyata		All
Corolla Chukyo Kuo TOM'S	Dallara F317	Toyota TOM's TAZ31	37	(Japan) Kazuto Kotaka		1–2, 4–7
Corolla Chukyo Kuo TOM'S	Dallara F317	Toyota TOM's TAZ31	37	(Japan) Sena Sakaguchi		3, 8

Icon	Class
M	Masters' Cup.

== Race calendar and results ==
Calendar for the 2019 season. All races are scheduled to be held in Japan.

Round		Circuit	Date	Pole position	Fastest lap	Winning driver	Winning team	Masters winner	Supporting
1	R1	Suzuka Circuit	21 April	(Japan) Ritomo Miyata	(Japan) Ritomo Miyata	(France) Sacha Fenestraz	B-Max Racing with Motopark	(Japan) Tairoku Yamaguchi	Super Formula
1	R2	Suzuka Circuit	21 April	(Japan) Ritomo Miyata	(Japan) Ritomo Miyata	(Japan) Ritomo Miyata	Corolla Chukyo Kuo TOM'S	(Japan) Tairoku Yamaguchi	Super Formula
2	R1	Autopolis	18 May	(France) Sacha Fenestraz	(France) Sacha Fenestraz	(France) Sacha Fenestraz	B-Max Racing with Motopark	(Japan) Tairoku Yamaguchi	Super Formula
2	R2	Autopolis	19 May	(France) Sacha Fenestraz	(France) Sacha Fenestraz	(France) Sacha Fenestraz	B-Max Racing with Motopark	No finishers	Super Formula
2	R3	Autopolis	19 May		(France) Sacha Fenestraz	(France) Sacha Fenestraz	B-Max Racing with Motopark	(Japan) Tairoku Yamaguchi	Super Formula
3	R1	Okayama International Circuit	8 June	(France) Sacha Fenestraz	(Japan) Ritomo Miyata	(France) Sacha Fenestraz	B-Max Racing with Motopark	(Japan) "Dragon"	
3	R2	Okayama International Circuit	9 June	(France) Sacha Fenestraz	(France) Sacha Fenestraz	(Japan) Ritomo Miyata	Corolla Chukyo Kuo TOM'S	(Japan) Tairoku Yamaguchi	
3	R3	Okayama International Circuit	9 June		(France) Sacha Fenestraz	(Japan) Yoshiaki Katayama	OIRC team YTB	(Japan) "Dragon"	
4	R1	Sportsland SUGO	22 June	(Japan) Ritomo Miyata	(Japan) Ritomo Miyata	(Japan) Ritomo Miyata	Corolla Chukyo Kuo TOM'S	(Japan) Katsuaki Kubota	Super Formula
4	R2	Sportsland SUGO	23 June	(Japan) Ritomo Miyata	(France) Sacha Fenestraz	(Japan) Toshiki Oyu	Toda Racing	(Japan) Katsuaki Kubota	Super Formula
5	R1	Fuji Speedway	13 July	(Japan) Ritomo Miyata	(United Kingdom) Enaam Ahmed	(United Kingdom) Enaam Ahmed	B-Max Racing with Motopark	(Japan) "Dragon"	Super Formula
5	R2	Fuji Speedway	14 July	(Japan) Ritomo Miyata	(France) Sacha Fenestraz	(France) Sacha Fenestraz	B-Max Racing with Motopark	(Japan) "Dragon"	Super Formula
6	R1	Sportsland SUGO	27 July	(Japan) Ritomo Miyata	(Japan) Ritomo Miyata	(Japan) Ritomo Miyata	Corolla Chukyo Kuo TOM'S	(Japan) "Dragon"	
6	R2	Sportsland SUGO	28 July	(United Kingdom) Enaam Ahmed	(France) Sacha Fenestraz	(United Kingdom) Enaam Ahmed	B-Max Racing with Motopark	No finishers	
6	R3	Sportsland SUGO	28 July		(Japan) Ritomo Miyata	(Japan) Ritomo Miyata	Corolla Chukyo Kuo TOM'S	(Japan) "Dragon"	
7	R1	Twin Ring Motegi	17 August	(France) Sacha Fenestraz	(France) Sacha Fenestraz	(France) Sacha Fenestraz	B-Max Racing with Motopark	(Japan) "Dragon"	Super Formula
7	R2	Twin Ring Motegi	18 August	(Japan) Ritomo Miyata	(Japan) Ritomo Miyata	(Japan) Ritomo Miyata	Corolla Chukyo Kuo TOM'S	(Japan) "Dragon"	Super Formula
7	R3	Twin Ring Motegi	18 August		(Japan) Ritomo Miyata	(France) Sacha Fenestraz	B-Max Racing with Motopark	(Japan) "Dragon"	Super Formula
8	R1	Okayama International Circuit	28 September	(Japan) Ritomo Miyata	(Japan) Ritomo Miyata	(Japan) Ritomo Miyata	Corolla Chukyo Kuo TOM'S	(Japan) "Dragon"	Super Formula
8	R2	Okayama International Circuit	29 September	(Japan) Ritomo Miyata	(Japan) Ritomo Miyata	(Japan) Ritomo Miyata	Corolla Chukyo Kuo TOM'S	(Japan) "Dragon"	Super Formula

== Championship standings ==
- Points are awarded as follows:

1	2	3	4	5	6	PP	FL
10	7	5	3	2	1	1	1

=== Drivers' Championships ===
==== Overall ====
Pos	Driver	SUZ		AUT			OKA1			SUG1		FUJ		SUG2			MOT			OKA2		Points
1	(France) Sacha Fenestraz	1	14	1	1	1	1	2	2	3	2	7	1	2	2	2	1	2	1	2	2	162
2	(Japan) Ritomo Miyata	2	1	7	8	6	3	1	3	1	DSQ	DSQ	3	1	3	1	2	1	2	1	1	142
3	(United Kingdom) Enaam Ahmed	3	2	3	3	Ret	10	7	Ret	6	3	1	2	4	1	4	Ret	13	11	Ret	7	63
4	(Japan) Toshiki Oyu	5	4	2	2	2	6	6	6	5	1	3	6	6	7	6	3	5	7	5	5	60
5	(Japan) Kazuto Kotaka	4	3	6	6	5				2	4	4	5	3	4	3	Ret	3	4			48
6	(Japan) Hiroki Otsu	6	7	5	5	3	9	Ret	9	4	6	2	4	9	10	8	4	8	3	4	6	36
7	(Japan) Yoshiaki Katayama	8	8	8	9	4	2	4	1	7	5	5	7	7	5	7	6	7	9	6	4	34
8	(Japan) Sena Sakaguchi						5	3	4											3	3	20
9	(France) Charles Milesi	9	6	10	7	7	4	5	5	Ret	DNS	WD	WD				11	4	5	7	9	13
10	(Japan) Shunsuke Kohno	7	5	4	4	8	7	8	7	8	7	6	Ret	8	9	9	7	6	Ret	8	11	10
11	(United Kingdom) Harrison Newey													5	6	5						5
12	(Japan) Ukyo Sasahara																5	9	6			3
13	(India) Ameya Vaidyanathan	Ret	11	9	10	9	8	12	8	9	8	9	8	10	11	11	8	10	12	9	8	0
14	(Japan) "Dragon"	12	12	13	Ret	DNS	11	10	10	Ret	Ret	10	9	12	Ret	12	9	11	8	11	12	0
15	(Belgium) Esteban Muth													11	8	10						0
16	(Japan) Hiroki Kokuzawa											8	Ret									0
17	(Japan) Ai Miura	10	9	12	11	10	13	11	12	10	9	Ret	DNS	WD	WD	WD	WD	WD	WD	10	10	0
18	(Japan) Tairoku Yamaguchi	11	10	11	Ret	11	12	9	11	Ret	Ret	WD	WD									0
19	(Japan) Katsuaki Kubota	13	13	14	Ret	Ret	14	13	Ret	11	10						10	12	10			0
20	(Japan) Takashi Hata																			12	13	0
Pos	Driver	SUZ		AUT			OKA1			SUG1		FUJ		SUG2			MOT			OKA2		Points

==== Masters Class ====
Pos	Driver	SUZ		AUT			OKA1			SUG1		FUJ		SUG2			MOT			OKA2		Points
1	(Japan) "Dragon"	12	12	13	Ret	DNS	11	10	10	Ret	Ret	10	9	12	Ret	12	9	11	8	11	12	162
2	(Japan) Tairoku Yamaguchi	11	10	11	Ret	11	12	9	11	Ret	Ret	WD	WD									76
3	(Japan) Katsuaki Kubota	13	13	14	Ret	Ret	14	13	Ret	11	10						10	12	10			66
4	(Japan) Takashi Hata																			12	13	14
Pos	Driver	SUZ		AUT			OKA1			SUG1		FUJ		SUG2			MOT			OKA2		Points

=== Teams Championship ===
Pos.	Team	Points
1	B-Max Racing with Motopark	168
2	Corolla Chukyo Kuo TOM'S	131
3	Toda Racing	60
4	OIRC by team YTB	40
5	ThreeBond Racing	36
6	RS Fine	10
NC	Tairoku Racing	0
NC	Hanashima Racing	0
Ref:

=== Engine tuner standings ===
Pos.	Engine tuner	Points
1	Siegfried Spiess Motorenbau GmbH	162
2	TOM'S	76
3	Toda Racing	60
4	Tomei Engine	36
5	HWA	10
