= 2015 French F4 Championship =

French motorsport season

Seasons
- ← 2014 2016 →

The 2015 French F4 Championship season is the 23rd season of the series for 1600cc Formula Renault machinery, and the fifth season to run under the guise of the French F4 Championship. The series began on April 18 at Lédenon and ended on October 25 at Le Castellet, after seven rounds and twenty-one races.

== Driver lineup ==
No.	Driver	Class	Rounds
1	(France) Julien Darras	I	All
2	(France) Théophile Senegas	I	1–4
3	(Russia) Nikita Troitskiy	I	1–2, 4
4	(China) Yifei Ye	J	All
5	(France) Julien Andlauer	J	All
6	(United Kingdom) Louis Gachot	J	All
7	(France) Valentin Moineault	I	All
8	(France) Gabriel Aubry	I	All
9	(Sweden) Reuben Kressner	I	All
10	(United States) Michael Benyahia	J	1–5, 7
11	(France) Sacha Fenestraz	J	All
12	(Russia) Nikita Sitnikov	I	1
13	(Canada) Kami Moreira-Laliberté	J	1–6
14	(Finland) Simo Laaksonen	I	All
15	(Mexico) Axel Matus	I	All
16	(France) Hugo Sugnot-Darniche	J	All
17	(Russia) Nerses Isaakyan	I	1–2, 4, 6–7
19	(Mexico) José Sierra	I	1–4, 6–7
21	(Russia) Aleksey Korneev	I	1–2, 4, 7
27	(France) Giuliano Alesi	J	All
Guest drivers
12	(United Kingdom) Alex Sedgwick	G	5
12	(France) Théo Coicaud	G	7
18	(France) Antoine Robert	G	5
18	(France) Hugo Chevalier	G	7
18	(France) Olivier Malo (Note: Participated in practice of Round 1–3.)		3
28	(France) Olivier Malo		1
20	(France) Olivier Malo		2
20	(France) Jean-Baptiste Mela	G	5
25	(France) Jim Pla (Note: Participated in practice of Round 2.)		2

Icon	Status
I	Drivers that compete for the International Championship
J	Drivers that compete for the Junior Championship
G	Guest drivers that are ineligible to score points

== Race calendar and results ==
A seven-round calendar was published on 4 December 2014. The championship will drop Val de Vienne, Nogaro and Jerez events, while Lédenon, Hungaroring and Navarra will take their place in the series' schedule.

Round		Circuit	Date	Pole position	Fastest lap	Winning driver	Junior winner	International winner
1	R1	(France) Circuit de Lédenon	18 April	(France) Giuliano Alesi	(France) Giuliano Alesi	(France) Giuliano Alesi	(France) Giuliano Alesi	(France) Valentin Moineault
1	R2	(France) Circuit de Lédenon	18 April		(Mexico) Axel Matus	(France) Sacha Fenestraz	(France) Sacha Fenestraz	(France) Gabriel Aubry
1	R3	(France) Circuit de Lédenon	19 April	(France) Giuliano Alesi	(France) Giuliano Alesi	(France) Giuliano Alesi	(France) Giuliano Alesi	(Russia) Nerses Isaakyan
2	R1	(France) Bugatti Circuit, Le Mans	2 May	(France) Valentin Moineault	(Russia) Aleksey Korneev	(Russia) Aleksey Korneev	(France) Sacha Fenestraz	(Russia) Aleksey Korneev
2	R2	(France) Bugatti Circuit, Le Mans	2 May		(Russia) Aleksey Korneev	(France) Julien Darras	(France) Sacha Fenestraz	(France) Julien Darras
2	R3	(France) Bugatti Circuit, Le Mans	3 May	(Mexico) Axel Matus	(Russia) Aleksey Korneev	(France) Valentin Moineault	(France) Giuliano Alesi	(France) Valentin Moineault
3	R1	(France) Circuit de Pau, Pau	16 May	(France) Sacha Fenestraz	(Finland) Simo Laaksonen	(France) Sacha Fenestraz	(France) Sacha Fenestraz	(France) Valentin Moineault
3	R2	(France) Circuit de Pau, Pau	16 May		(France) Valentin Moineault	(Mexico) Axel Matus	(France) Giuliano Alesi	(Mexico) Axel Matus
3	R3	(France) Circuit de Pau, Pau	17 May	(France) Sacha Fenestraz	(France) Sacha Fenestraz	(France) Sacha Fenestraz	(France) Sacha Fenestraz	(France) Valentin Moineault
4	R1	(Hungary) Hungaroring	13 June	(France) Valentin Moineault	(France) Valentin Moineault	(France) Valentin Moineault	(France) Sacha Fenestraz	(France) Valentin Moineault
4	R2	(Hungary) Hungaroring	14 June		(France) Gabriel Aubry	(France) Gabriel Aubry	(France) Julien Andlauer	(France) Gabriel Aubry
4	R3	(Hungary) Hungaroring	14 June	(France) Valentin Moineault	(France) Valentin Moineault	(France) Valentin Moineault	(France) Sacha Fenestraz	(France) Valentin Moineault
5	R1	(France) Circuit de Nevers Magny-Cours	29 August	(France) Valentin Moineault	(Canada) Kami Moreira-Laliberté	(France) Valentin Moineault	(France) Sacha Fenestraz	(France) Valentin Moineault
5	R2	(France) Circuit de Nevers Magny-Cours	29 August		(France) Julien Andlauer	(Finland) Simo Laaksonen	(Canada) Kami Moreira-Laliberté	(Finland) Simo Laaksonen
5	R3	(France) Circuit de Nevers Magny-Cours	30 August	(France) Valentin Moineault	(France) Julien Darras	(France) Valentin Moineault	(France) Sacha Fenestraz	(France) Valentin Moineault
6	R1	(Spain) Circuito de Navarra, Los Arcos	26 September	(France) Valentin Moineault	(France) Gabriel Aubry	(France) Giuliano Alesi	(France) Giuliano Alesi	(France) Valentin Moineault
6	R2	(Spain) Circuito de Navarra, Los Arcos	26 September		(France) Julien Andlauer	(China) Yifei Ye	(China) Yifei Ye	(Russia) Nerses Isaakyan
6	R3	(Spain) Circuito de Navarra, Los Arcos	27 September	(France) Valentin Moineault	(France) Gabriel Aubry	(France) Valentin Moineault	(France) Julien Andlauer	(France) Valentin Moineault
7	R1	(France) Circuit Paul Ricard, Le Castellet	24 October	(France) Valentin Moineault	(France) Sacha Fenestraz	(France) Valentin Moineault	(France) Sacha Fenestraz	(France) Valentin Moineault
7	R2	(France) Circuit Paul Ricard, Le Castellet	24 October		(France) Gabriel Aubry	(China) Yifei Ye	(China) Yifei Ye	(France) Julien Darras
7	R3	(France) Circuit Paul Ricard, Le Castellet	25 October	(France) Valentin Moineault	(France) Valentin Moineault	(France) Valentin Moineault	(France) Sacha Fenestraz	(France) Valentin Moineault

== Championship standings ==
Points system

Points were awarded as follows:

Position	**1st**	**2nd**	**3rd**	**4th**	**5th**	**6th**	**7th**	**8th**	**9th**	**10th**	PP	FL
Points	25	18	15	12	10	8	6	4	2	1	**1**	1

=== French F4 Championship ===
The third race at Lédenon was red-flagged after less than half of the distance had been completed due to torrential rain. As a result, series organisers awarded half points to each of the classified finishers eligible to score points.

Pos	Driver	LÉD (France)			LMS (France)			PAU (France)			HUN (Hungary)			MAG (France)			NAV (Spain)			LEC (France)			Points
1	(France) Valentin Moineault	2	7	7	**4**	6	1	2	10	2	**1**	7	**1**	**1**	Ret	**1**	**2**	11	**1**	**1**	6	**1**	329
2	(France) Sacha Fenestraz	8	1	8	2	4	8	**1**	Ret	**1**	3	9	3	2	Ret	4	5	3	8	2	5	3	253
3	(France) Gabriel Aubry	4	3	6	16	16	14†	3	4	3	10	1	2	3	Ret	2	3	5	3	3	7	4	227
4	(France) Giuliano Alesi	**1**	Ret	**1**	7	5	12	5	2	4	8	Ret	6	12	5	Ret	1	8	5	6	10	Ret	168.5
5	(France) Julien Darras	7	6	15	10	1	3	14	3	Ret	7	2	10	Ret	6	3	6	7	7	10	2	6	166
6	(Finland) Simo Laaksonen	13	9	9	5	3	Ret	4	Ret	6	6	4	7	6	1	6	11	12	9	4	9	2	150
7	(Mexico) Axel Matus	3	4	5	3	9	**13**	8	1	8	Ret	10	13	7	8	12	Ret	13	11	7	4	5	125
8	(France) Julien Andlauer	9	2	18†	11	15	6	7	11	Ret	4	5	4	14	4	7	Ret	9	2	8	Ret	8	116
9	(Canada) Kami Moreira-Laliberté	6	5	4	8	8	Ret	Ret	9	9	15	12	17	4	2	5	4	10	4				102
10	(Sweden) Reuben Kressner	12	Ret	3	18	14	5	6	Ret	5	12	Ret	9	5	3	8	7	6	10	Ret	11	7	87.5
11	(Russia) Aleksey Korneev	10	12	14	1	7	4				5	3	5							17	12	11	83
12	(China) Yifei Ye	18	11	11	13	10	7	10	5	Ret	14	14	11	13	Ret	11	9	1	12	9	1	12	73
13	(Russia) Nikita Troitskiy	14	8	19†	6	2	2				2	Ret	8										70
14	(United Kingdom) Louis Gachot	11	Ret	10	9	12	Ret	9	12	Ret	9	6	14	8	9	13	10	4	15	5	3	Ret	60.5
15	(Russia) Nerses Isaakyan	5	Ret	2	15	11	9				11	11	12				8	2	6	11	8	10	57
16	(France) Hugo Sugnot-Darniche	15	Ret	16	17	13	Ret	11	6	7	13	8	19†	15	Ret	14†	13	15	14	12	16	14	18
17	(United States) Michaël Benyahia	17	13	17	14	17	10	13	8	10	16	13	16	10	12	9				15	14	15	12
18	(France) Théophile Senegas	16	10	13	12	18	Ret	12	7	12	Ret	Ret	15										7
19	(Mexico) José Sierra	19	14	12	19†	19	11	Ret	Ret	11	17	15	18				12	14	13	14	15	13	0
	(Russia) Nikita Sitnikov	WD	WD	WD																			0
Guest drivers ineligible for points
	(France) Jean-Baptiste Mela													9	7	Ret							0
	(France) Hugo Chevalier																			13	13	9	0
	(United Kingdom) Alex Sedgwick													11	11	10							0
	(France) Antoine Robert													16	10	Ret							0
	(France) Théo Coicaud																			16	17†	Ret	0
Pos	Driver	LÉD (France)			LMS (France)			PAU (France)			HUN (Hungary)			MAG (France)			NAV (Spain)			LEC (France)			Points

Colour	Result
Gold	Winner
Silver	Second place
Bronze	Third place
Green	Points classification
Blue	Non-points classification
Blue	Non-classified finish (NC)
Purple	Retired, not classified (Ret)
Red	Did not qualify (DNQ)
Red	Did not pre-qualify (DNPQ)
Black	Disqualified (DSQ)
White	Did not start (DNS)
White	Withdrew (WD)
White	Race cancelled (C)
Blank	Did not practice (DNP)
Blank	Did not arrive (DNA)
Blank	Excluded (EX)

**Bold** – Pole
Italics – Fastest Lap

† — Drivers did not finish the race, but were classified as they completed over 75% of the race distance.

=== International F4 Championship ===
Pos	Driver	LÉD (France)			LMS (France)			PAU (France)			HUN (Hungary)			MAG (France)			NAV (Spain)			LEC (France)			Pts
1	(France) Valentin Moineault	2	7	7	4	6	1	2	10	2	1	7	1	1	Ret	1	2	11	1	1	6	1	389
2	(France) Gabriel Aubry	4	3	6	16	16	14†	3	4	3	10	1	2	3	Ret	2	3	5	3	3	7	4	287
3	(France) Julien Darras	7	6	15	10	1	3	14	3	Ret	7	2	10	Ret	6	3	6	7	7	10	2	6	245.5
4	(Finland) Simo Laaksonen	13	9	9	5	3	Ret	4	Ret	6	6	4	7	6	1	6	11	12	9	4	9	2	222
5	(Mexico) Axel Matus	3	4	5	3	9	13	8	1	8	Ret	10	13	7	8	12	Ret	13	11	7	4	5	212.5
6	(Sweden) Reuben Kressner	12	Ret	3	18	14	5	6	Ret	5	12	Ret	9	5	3	8	7	6	10	Ret	11	7	161
7	(Russia) Nerses Isaakyan	5	Ret	2	15	11	9				11	11	12				8	2	6	11	8	10	132.5
8	(Russia) Aleksey Korneev	10	12	14	1	7	4				5	3	5							17	12	11	117
9	(Russia) Nikita Troitskiy	14	8	19†	6	2	2				2	Ret	8										86
10	(Mexico) José Sierra	19	14	12	19†	19	11	Ret	Ret	11	17	15	18				12	14	13	14	15	13	49
11	(France) Théophile Senegas	16	10	13	12	18	Ret	12	7	12	Ret	Ret	15										43
	(Russia) Nikita Sitnikov	WD	WD	WD																			0
Pos	Driver	LÉD (France)			LMS (France)			PAU (France)			HUN (Hungary)			MAG (France)			NAV (Spain)			LEC (France)			Pts

=== Junior F4 Championship ===
Pos	Driver	LÉD (France)			LMS (France)			PAU (France)			HUN (Hungary)			MAG (France)			NAV (Spain)			LEC (France)			Pts
1	(France) Sacha Fenestraz	8	1	8	2	4	8	1	Ret	1	3	9	3	2	Ret	4	5	3	8	2	5	3	384,5
2	(France) Giuliano Alesi	1	Ret	1	7	5	12	5	2	4	8	Ret	6	12	5	Ret	1	8	5	6	10	Ret	278.5
3	(France) Julien Andlauer	9	2	18†	11	15	6	7	11	Ret	4	5	4	14	4	7	Ret	9	2	8	Ret	8	259
4	(China) Yifei Ye	18	11	11	13	10	7	10	5	Ret	14	14	11	13	Ret	11	9	1	12	9	1	12	221
5	(Canada) Kami Moreira-Laliberté	6	5	4	8	8	Ret	Ret	9	9	15	12	17	4	2	5	4	10	4				228
6	(United Kingdom) Louis Gachot	11	Ret	10	9	12	Ret	9	12	Ret	9	6	14	8	9	13	10	4	15	5	3	Ret	198
7	(United States) Michaël Benyahia	17	13	17	14	17	10	13	8	10	16	13	16	10	12	9				15	14	15	149
8	(France) Hugo Sugnot-Darniche	15	Ret	16	17	13	Ret	11	6	7	13	8	19†	15	Ret	14†	13	15	14	12	16	14	141
Pos	Driver	LÉD (France)			LMS (France)			PAU (France)			HUN (Hungary)			MAG (France)			NAV (Spain)			LEC (France)			Pts
