= 2016 Formula Renault 2.0 Northern European Cup =

Formula racing season

2016 Formula Renault 2.0 NEC

Seasons
- ← 2015 2017 →

The 2016 Formula Renault 2.0 Northern European Cup was the eleventh Formula Renault 2.0 Northern European Cup season, an open-wheel motor racing series for emerging young racing drivers based in Europe.

== Drivers and teams ==
Team	No.	Driver name	Status	Rounds
(Germany) Josef Kaufmann Racing	1	(India) Jehan Daruvala		All
(Germany) Josef Kaufmann Racing	2	(United Kingdom) Lando Norris	R	All
(Germany) Josef Kaufmann Racing	3	(Russia) Robert Shwartzman	R	All
(United Kingdom) Fortec Motorsports	5	(Russia) Vasily Romanov		1–5
(United Kingdom) Fortec Motorsports	6	(Brazil) Bruno Baptista		All
(United Kingdom) Fortec Motorsports	7	(Russia) Nikita Troitskiy	R	1–6
(United Kingdom) Fortec Motorsports	30	(Russia) Aleksandr Vartanyan	R	6–7
(United Kingdom) Fortec Motorsports	62	(Austria) Ferdinand Habsburg		2–6
(France) Tech 1 Racing	9	(France) Dorian Boccolacci		All
(France) Tech 1 Racing	10	(Switzerland) Hugo de Sadeleer		All
(France) Tech 1 Racing	11	(France) Sacha Fenestraz	R	All
(France) Tech 1 Racing	12	(France) Gabriel Aubry	R	1, 4, 6–7
(France) R-ace GP	14	(United Kingdom) Will Palmer		1–5, 7
(France) R-ace GP	15	(New Zealand) Marcus Armstrong	R	6
(France) R-ace GP	16	(France) Julien Falchero		All
(France) R-ace GP	33	(Belgium) Max Defourny		All
(Italy) JD Motorsport	17	(Russia) Aleksey Korneev	R	1, 3–4, 6–7
(Italy) JD Motorsport	18	(Australia) James Allen		All
(Italy) JD Motorsport	19	(South Africa) Callan O'Keeffe		2
(Italy) JD Motorsport	35	(Belgium) Ghislain Cordeel	R	4–5
(Spain) AVF by Adrián Vallés	21	(Portugal) Henrique Chaves		All
(Spain) AVF by Adrián Vallés	24	(Russia) Nerses Isaakyan	R	All
(Spain) AVF by Adrián Vallés	42	(Poland) Julia Pankiewicz	R	All
(United Kingdom) Mark Burdett Motorsport	27	(United Kingdom) Alex Gill		All
(United Kingdom) Mark Burdett Motorsport	28	(United Kingdom) Finlay Hutchison	R	All
(Denmark) KEO Racing	32	(Denmark) Kasper Larsen		1–2, 4–6
(France) Formula Motorsport	36	(France) Thomas Neubauer	R	4
(France) Formula Motorsport	37	(France) Nicolas Melin	R	4
(France) Formula Motorsport	94	(France) Philippe Haezebrouck		4–5
(United Kingdom) Mark Godwin Racing	38	(United States) David Porcelli		2
(Italy) Cram Motorsport	40	(Poland) Antoni Ptak Jr.		4–5
(Italy) TS Corse	73	(Italy) Pietro Peccenini		4
(Germany) Dutt Motorsport	77	(Germany) Laurents Hörr		1–2, 4–7
(Poland) Inter Europol Competition	94	(France) Philippe Haezebrouck		7
(Poland) BM Racing Team	96	(Poland) Bartłomiej Mirecki		All

== Race calendar and results ==
The seven-event provisional calendar for the 2016 season was released on 8 October 2015. The calendar was set to remain unchanged and feature all the circuits that were in the previous season, but a further update replaced the event at Red Bull Ring with a stand-alone event at Hungaroring.

Round		Circuit	Date	Pole position	Fastest lap	Winning driver	Winning team	Rookie winner	Event
1	R1	(Italy) Autodromo Nazionale Monza	23 April	(India) Jehan Daruvala	(Russia) Robert Shwartzman	(France) Dorian Boccolacci	(France) Tech 1 Racing	(Russia) Nikita Troitskiy	Blancpain GT Series Endurance Cup
1	R2	(Italy) Autodromo Nazionale Monza	24 April	(Belgium) Max Defourny	(India) Jehan Daruvala	(Belgium) Max Defourny	(France) R-ace GP	(United Kingdom) Lando Norris	Blancpain GT Series Endurance Cup
2	R1	(United Kingdom) Silverstone Circuit	14 May	(Belgium) Max Defourny	(Belgium) Max Defourny	(Belgium) Max Defourny	(France) R-ace GP	(Russia) Robert Shwartzman	Blancpain GT Series Endurance Cup
2	R2	(United Kingdom) Silverstone Circuit	15 May	(United Kingdom) Lando Norris	(United Kingdom) Lando Norris	(United Kingdom) Lando Norris	(Germany) Josef Kaufmann Racing	(United Kingdom) Lando Norris	Blancpain GT Series Endurance Cup
3	R1	(Hungary) Hungaroring	19 June	(United Kingdom) Lando Norris	(Switzerland) Hugo de Sadeleer	(United Kingdom) Lando Norris	(Germany) Josef Kaufmann Racing	(United Kingdom) Lando Norris	stand-alone event
3	R2	(Hungary) Hungaroring	19 June	(United Kingdom) Lando Norris	(India) Jehan Daruvala	(India) Jehan Daruvala	(Germany) Josef Kaufmann Racing	(Russia) Robert Shwartzman	stand-alone event
4	R1	(Belgium) Circuit de Spa-Francorchamps	29 July	(United Kingdom) Lando Norris	(United Kingdom) Lando Norris	(United Kingdom) Lando Norris	(Germany) Josef Kaufmann Racing	(United Kingdom) Lando Norris	Spa 24 Hours; Blancpain GT Series Endurance Cup
4	R2	(Belgium) Circuit de Spa-Francorchamps	30 July	(United Kingdom) Lando Norris	(United Kingdom) Lando Norris	(United Kingdom) Lando Norris	(Germany) Josef Kaufmann Racing	(United Kingdom) Lando Norris	Spa 24 Hours; Blancpain GT Series Endurance Cup
5	R1	(Netherlands) TT Circuit Assen	6 August	(United Kingdom) Lando Norris	(Belgium) Max Defourny	(United Kingdom) Lando Norris	(Germany) Josef Kaufmann Racing	(United Kingdom) Lando Norris	Gamma Racing Day
5	R2	(Netherlands) TT Circuit Assen	7 August	(United Kingdom) Lando Norris	(Belgium) Max Defourny	(Belgium) Max Defourny	(France) R-ace GP	(United Kingdom) Lando Norris	Gamma Racing Day
6	R1	(Germany) Nürburgring	17 September	(United Kingdom) Lando Norris	(United Kingdom) Lando Norris	(Russia) Robert Shwartzman	(Germany) Josef Kaufmann Racing	(Russia) Robert Shwartzman	Blancpain GT Series Endurance Cup
6	R2	(Germany) Nürburgring	18 September	(United Kingdom) Lando Norris	(Belgium) Max Defourny	(United Kingdom) Lando Norris	(Germany) Josef Kaufmann Racing	(United Kingdom) Lando Norris	Blancpain GT Series Endurance Cup
7	R1	(Germany) Hockenheimring	1 October	(United Kingdom) Lando Norris	(Switzerland) Hugo de Sadeleer	(France) Sacha Fenestraz	(France) Tech 1 Racing	(France) Sacha Fenestraz	ADAC GT Masters
7	R2	(Germany) Hockenheimring	2 October	(Russia) Robert Shwartzman	(Belgium) Max Defourny	(Russia) Robert Shwartzman	(Germany) Josef Kaufmann Racing	(Russia) Robert Shwartzman	ADAC GT Masters
7	R3	(Germany) Hockenheimring	2 October	(France) Sacha Fenestraz	(Russia) Robert Shwartzman	(Australia) James Allen	(Italy) JD Motorsport	(United Kingdom) Lando Norris	ADAC GT Masters

== Championship standings ==
Points system

Points were awarded to the top 20 classified finishers.

Position	**1st**	**2nd**	**3rd**	**4th**	**5th**	**6th**	**7th**	**8th**	**9th**	**10th**	**11th**	**12th**	**13th**	**14th**	**15th**	**16th**	**17th**	**18th**	**19th**	**20th**
Points	30	24	20	17	16	15	14	13	12	11	10	9	8	7	6	5	4	3	2	1

=== Drivers' championship ===
Pos.	Driver	MNZ (Italy)		SIL (United Kingdom)		HUN (Hungary)		SPA (Belgium)		ASS (Netherlands)		NÜR (Germany)		HOC (Germany)			Points
Pos.	Driver	1	2	3	4	5	6	7	8	9	10	11	12	13	14	15	Points
1	(United Kingdom) Lando Norris	3	4	Ret	**1**	**1**	**Ret**	**1**	**1**	**1**	**2**	**2**	**1**	**2**	4	3	326
2	(Belgium) Max Defourny	19	**1**	**1**	5	10	7	Ret	2	5	1	3	2	3	2	2	285
3	(France) Dorian Boccolacci	1	5	2	3	17	8	2	6	2	4	5	Ret	11	22	8	226
4	(India) Jehan Daruvala	**4**	2	5	4	13	1	7	Ret	3	3	4	3	Ret	13	9	223
5	(France) Sacha Fenestraz	7	14	13	13	16	5	10	3	4	5	6	6	1	3	**16**	207
6	(Russia) Robert Shwartzman	5	22	11	Ret	5	2	6	8	7	7	1	Ret	5	**1**	13	206
7	(Australia) James Allen	14	16	6	12	12	12	3	4	17	11	14	9	8	11	1	177
8	(United Kingdom) Alex Gill	9	8	7	8	6	17	4	5	12	9	7	15	Ret	6	5	176
9	(Switzerland) Hugo de Sadeleer	10	12	9	14	19	4	16	10	9	12	8	5	14	5	6	162
10	(Poland) Bartłomiej Mirecki	15	17	16	16	4	6	14	17	15	19	12	12	4	7	4	137
11	(Austria) Ferdinand Habsburg			4	10	3	3	12	7	6	8	10	Ret				130
12	(United Kingdom) Will Palmer	13	3	3	2	9	18	DNS	Ret	11	6			16	12	21	126
13	(France) Julien Falchero	Ret	11	8	6	Ret	16	8	12	16	16	11	7	7	16	10	124
14	(Russia) Nikita Troitskiy	2	6	14	11	14	13	17	13	10	10	18	13				116
15	(Portugal) Henrique Chaves	11	10	22	Ret	8	10	5	9	Ret	14	16	17	10	15	DNS	106
16	(Russia) Vasily Romanov	8	9	10	9	2	14	13	11	13	Ret						105
17	(Brazil) Bruno Baptista	Ret	Ret	12	15	11	Ret	DNS	19	8	15	9	8	9	21	7	97
18	(France) Gabriel Aubry	6	7					11	16			13	11	Ret	9	19	76
19	(Russia) Aleksey Korneev	Ret	15			7	9	Ret	14			17	10	Ret	8	14	74
20	(Germany) Laurents Hörr	12	19	17	21			15	15	14	18	19	16	12	14	12	69
21	(Russia) Nerses Isaakyan	Ret	13	15	17	15	11	Ret	21	16	17	Ret	14	15	17	15	66
22	(Russia) Aleksandr Vartanyan											20	18	6	10	11	40
23	(United Kingdom) Finlay Hutchison	16	18	19	18	18	15	19	22	19	22	21	20	18	18	17	37
24	(New Zealand) Marcus Armstrong											15	4				23
25	(Poland) Antoni Ptak Jr.							9	18	22	13						23
26	(Denmark) Kasper Larsen	17	20	18	19			18	20	20	20	22	19				18
27	(Poland) Julia Pankiewicz	18	21	21	Ret	20	Ret	22	26	21	21	Ret	21	13	19	18	17
28	(South Africa) Callan O'Keeffe			23	7												14
29	(France) Philippe Haezebrouck							23	27	23	24			17	20	20	6
30	(Belgium) Ghislain Cordeel							Ret	28	18	23						3
31	(United States) David Porcelli			20	20												2
32	(France) Thomas Neubauer							20	23								1
33	(France) Nicolas Melin							21	24								0
34	(Italy) Pietro Peccenini							DNS	25								0
Pos.	Driver	MNZ (Italy)		SIL (United Kingdom)		HUN (Hungary)		SPA (Belgium)		ASS (Netherlands)		NÜR (Germany)		HOC (Germany)			Points

Colour	Result
Gold	Winner
Silver	Second place
Bronze	Third place
Green	Points classification
Blue	Non-points classification
Blue	Non-classified finish (NC)
Purple	Retired, not classified (Ret)
Red	Did not qualify (DNQ)
Red	Did not pre-qualify (DNPQ)
Black	Disqualified (DSQ)
White	Did not start (DNS)
White	Withdrew (WD)
White	Race cancelled (C)
Blank	Did not practice (DNP)
Blank	Did not arrive (DNA)
Blank	Excluded (EX)

**Bold** – Pole
Italics – Fastest Lap

Rookie

† — Drivers did not finish the race, but were classified as they completed over 75% of the race distance.

=== Teams' championship ===
Pos.	Driver	MNZ (Italy)		SIL (United Kingdom)		HUN (Hungary)		SPA (Belgium)		ASS (Netherlands)		NÜR (Germany)		HOC (Germany)			Points
1	(Germany) Josef Kaufmann Racing	3	4	5	1	1	1	1	1	1	2	1	1	2	1	3	398
2	(France) R-ace GP	13	**1**	**1**	2	9	7	8	2	5	1	3	2	3	2	2	313
3	(France) Tech 1 Racing	1	5	2	3	16	4	2	3	2	4	5	5	1	3	6	294
4	(United Kingdom) Fortec Motorsports	2	6	4	9	2	3	12	7	6	8	9	8	6	10	7	228
5	(Italy) JD Motorsport	14	15	6	7	7	9	3	4	17	11	14	9	8	8	1	194
6	(United Kingdom) Mark Burdett Motorsport	9	8	7	8	6	15	4	5	12	9	7	15	18	6	5	181
7	(Poland) BM Racing Team	15	17	16	16	4	6	14	17	15	19	12	12	4	7	4	137
8	(Spain) AVF by Adrián Vallés	11	10	15	17	8	10	5	9	16	14	16	14	10	15	10	130
9	(Germany) Dutt Motorsport	12	19	17	21			15	15	14	18	19	16	12	14	12	69
10	(Italy) Cram Motorsport							9	18	22	13						23
11	(Denmark) KEO Racing	17	20	18	19			18	20	20	20	22	19				18
12	(Poland) Inter Europol Competition													17	20	20	6
13	(United Kingdom) MGR Motorsport			20	20												2
14	(France) Formula Motorsport							20	23								1
15	(Italy) TS Corse							DNS	25								0
Pos.	Driver	MNZ (Italy)		SIL (United Kingdom)		HUN (Hungary)		SPA (Belgium)		ASS (Netherlands)		NÜR (Germany)		HOC (Germany)			Points

Colour	Result
Gold	Winner
Silver	Second place
Bronze	Third place
Green	Points classification
Blue	Non-points classification
Blue	Non-classified finish (NC)
Purple	Retired, not classified (Ret)
Red	Did not qualify (DNQ)
Red	Did not pre-qualify (DNPQ)
Black	Disqualified (DSQ)
White	Did not start (DNS)
White	Withdrew (WD)
White	Race cancelled (C)
Blank	Did not practice (DNP)
Blank	Did not arrive (DNA)
Blank	Excluded (EX)

**Bold** – Pole
Italics – Fastest Lap

† — Drivers did not finish the race, but were classified as they completed over 75% of the race distance.
