= Sacha Fenestraz =

French and Argentine racing driver

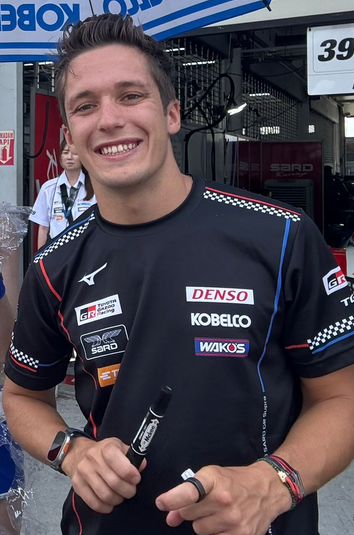
- Fenestraz at the 2025 Super GT Malaysia Festival
- Nationality: (France) French (Argentina) Argentine (Note: Fenestraz, a dual citizen, competed under a French racing licence earlier in his career. Since 2025, he represents Argentina.)
- Born: Sacha Fenestraz Jules; 28 July 1999 (age 27) Annecy, France

Super Formula Championship career
- Debut season: 2020
- Current team: Vantelin Team TOM'S
- Car number: 37
- Former teams: Kondo Racing
- Starts: 41
- Wins: 3
- Podiums: 8
- Poles: 2
- Fastest laps: 0
- Best finish: 2nd in 2022

Super GT - GT500 career
- Debut season: 2020
- Current team: TGR Team SARD
- Car number: 39
- Former teams: TOM'S
- Starts: 35
- Wins: 1
- Podiums: 10
- Poles: 1
- Fastest laps: 2
- Best finish: 4th in 2020

Previous series
- 2022–24 2019 2018 2017–18 2016–17 2016–17 2015: Formula E Japanese F3 Championship; GP3 Series; FIA European F3; Eurocup Formula Renault 2.0; Formula Renault 2.0 NEC; French F4 Championship

Championship titles
- 2019 2017 2015: Japanese F3 Championship; Formula Renault Eurocup; French F4 Junior Champion

Sacha Fenestraz Jules (born 28 July 1999) is a French and Argentine racing driver who competes in Super Formula for TOM'S. Fenestraz was the 2017 Formula Renault Eurocup champion, and raced in Formula 3 under the Renault Sport Academy before shifting his career to Japan. He finished runner-up in Super Formula in 2022 behind Tomoki Nojiri. Fenestraz has also competed in Formula E for Dragon / Penske and Nissan.

== Early career ==
=== Karting ===
Born in Annecy, France to a French-Argentine family, and raised in Cordoba, Argentina, Fenestraz began karting in 2006 at the age of seven, partaking in events across France and Argentina.

=== Formula 4 ===
In 2015, Fenestraz graduated to single-seaters. He partook in the French F4 Championship, where he claimed three victories and eleven junior victories. As a result, he finished as Junior F4 champion and vice-champion in the overall standings.

=== Formula Renault 2.0 ===
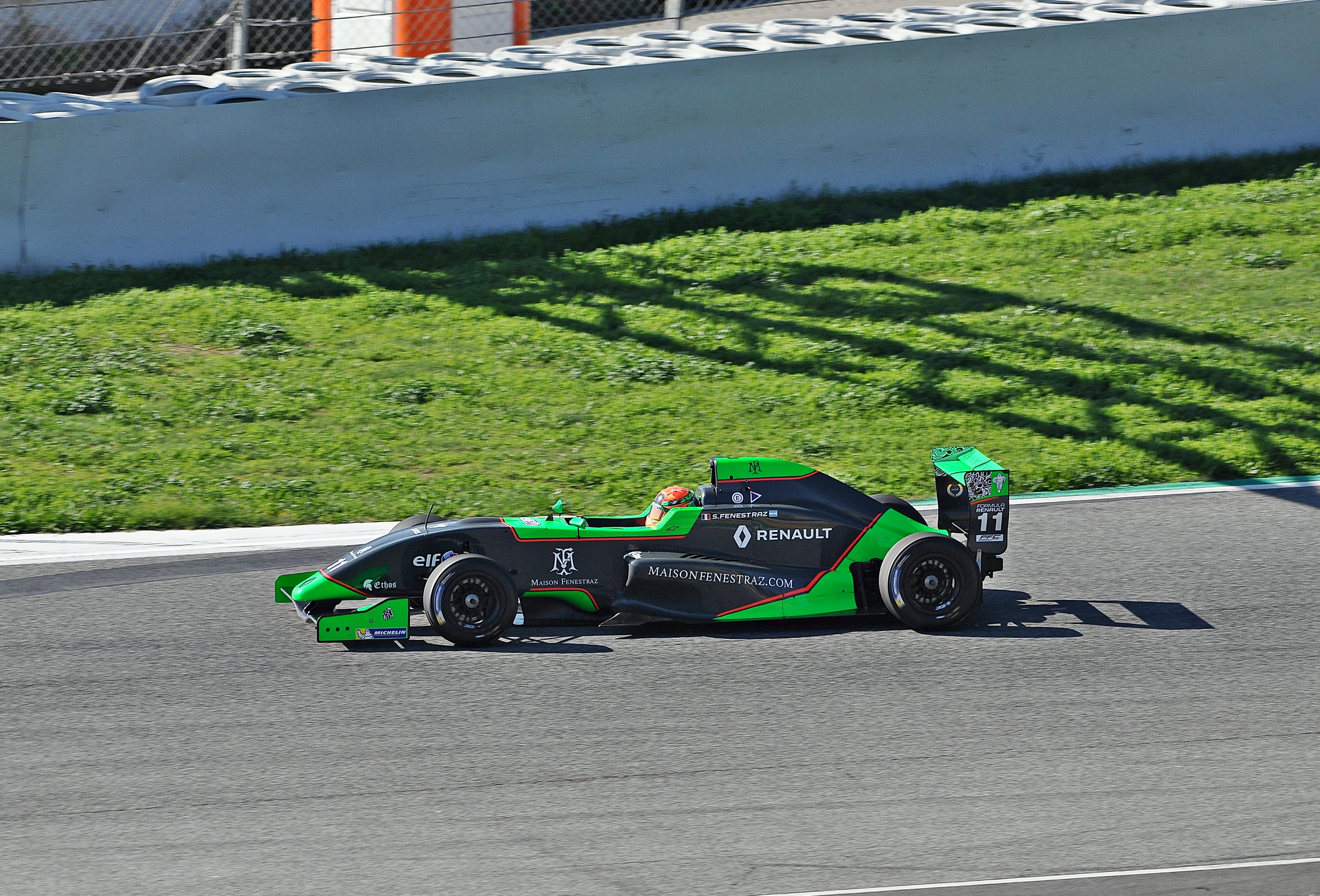
Fenestraz driving in Formula Renault in 2016

In 2016, Fenestraz switched to Formula Renault 2.0 with Tech 1 Racing. He claimed his first pole position at the Monaco round, following the exclusion of former pole sitter Lando Norris, and subsequently took his first victory in the race. He followed that up with a second pole and victory at the final race at Estoril to finish fifth in the overall standings. He also claimed a victory and finished fifth in the Northern European Cup.

After testing with them in the post-season test at Estoril, Fenestraz signed with team champions Josef Kaufmann Racing for 2017. Fenestraz won the championship with a race to spare. He won seven races and had finished another eleven races on the podium position. After he won the championship, he was included into the Renault Sport Academy.

=== FIA European Formula 3 Championship ===
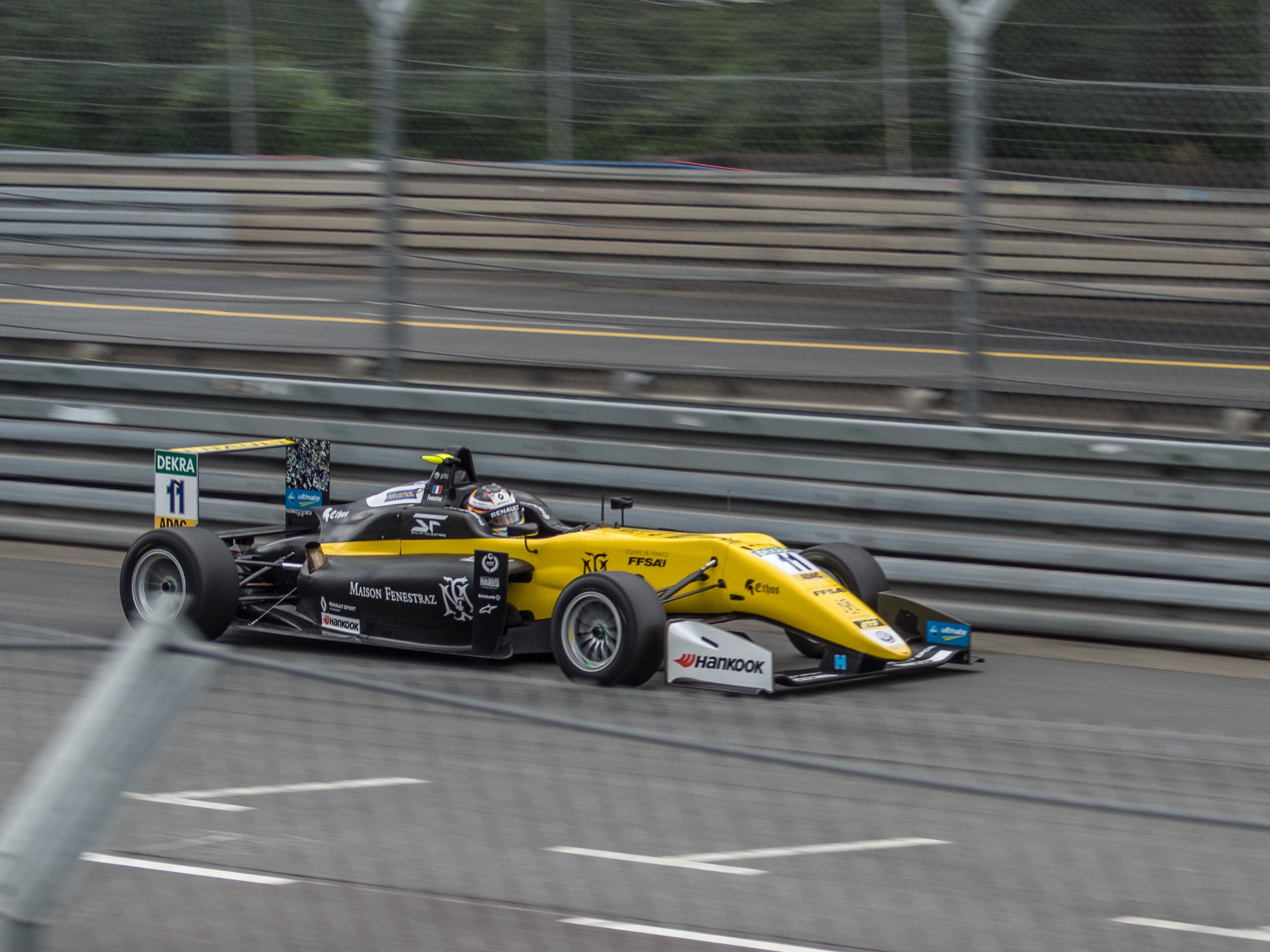
Sacha Fenestraz during the FIA European Formula 3 round at Norisring in 2018.

In September 2017, Fenestraz joined Carlin for the eighth round at the Nürburgring. In 2018, he contested with the team full-time. He scored his first podium and victory of the season during the second race in Pau. He started this race from pole position and also managed to set the fastest lap of the race, but could only manage eleventh in the championship. At the Macau Grand Prix, Fenestraz came away with third in the race.

=== GP3 Series ===
Fenestraz partook in the final two rounds of the 2018 GP3 Series with Arden International.

=== Japanese Formula 3 ===
After losing his backing from Renault, Fenestraz moved to Japan to contest the Japanese Formula 3 Championship with B-Max Racing with Motopark. Fighting throughout the season with TOM'S racer Ritomo Miyata, Fenestraz claimed eight wins and secured the title at Motegi with a round to spare, thus becoming the first rookie driver to win the title since Nick Cassidy in 2015.

== Super Formula ==
=== 2020–2022 ===
In 2020, Fenestraz moved up to Super Formula with Kondo Racing. He continued to compete with Kondo Racing, but could only drive in the last three rounds given that Fenestraz had been unable to enter Japan because the government had closed its borders due to the pandemic. Fenestraz continued racing with the same team, but this time he had his best season in Super Formula, where he clinched his maiden win in Sportsland SUGO, and adding a couple of podiums to his name.

=== 2025–present ===
Fenestraz returned to Super Formula for 2025 after being dropped by Nissan Formula E. He joined TOM'S alongside reigning champion Sho Tsuboi. At the October Fuji Speedway race, Fenestraz scored pole position and victory under torrential rain – his first under the flag of Argentina.

== Super GT ==
=== GT300 ===
In addition to his 2019 Japanese Formula 3 campaign, Fenestraz also partook in the GT300 class of the Super GT championship with Kondo Racing, finishing sixth overall with couple of podiums.

=== GT500 ===
The following year, Fenestraz graduated to the GT500 class with Lexus rebranded Toyota Gazoo Racing replacing Kazuki Nakajima at TGR TOM'S au and partnering Yuhi Sekiguchi. Four podiums to his name alongside Sekiguchi placed fourth in the standings. Fenestraz stayed with the same team, but moved to the KeePer car pairing up with Ryo Hirakawa. Unfortunately, he was denied entry to Japan due to border restriction caused by the pandemic. He raced in the fifth round of the series, and by end of season clinched one podium. He continued to compete same team, but with new teammate of Ritomo Miyata. In that season, Fenestraz and Miyata clinched their GT500 maiden win in Fuji Speedway.

Fenestraz returned to GT500 in 2025 for his return to Japan. He would join SARD alongside his 2020 teammate Yuhi Sekiguchi.

== Formula E ==
In February 2020, Fenestraz was named as one of Panasonic Jaguar Racing's entrants into the rookie test in Marrakesh. In the test, Fenestraz set the fourth fastest time of the morning session and finish tenth overall in the afternoon session and overall classification. The following year, Fenestraz was named as Jaguar's reserve driver for the 2021 season opener at Riyadh.

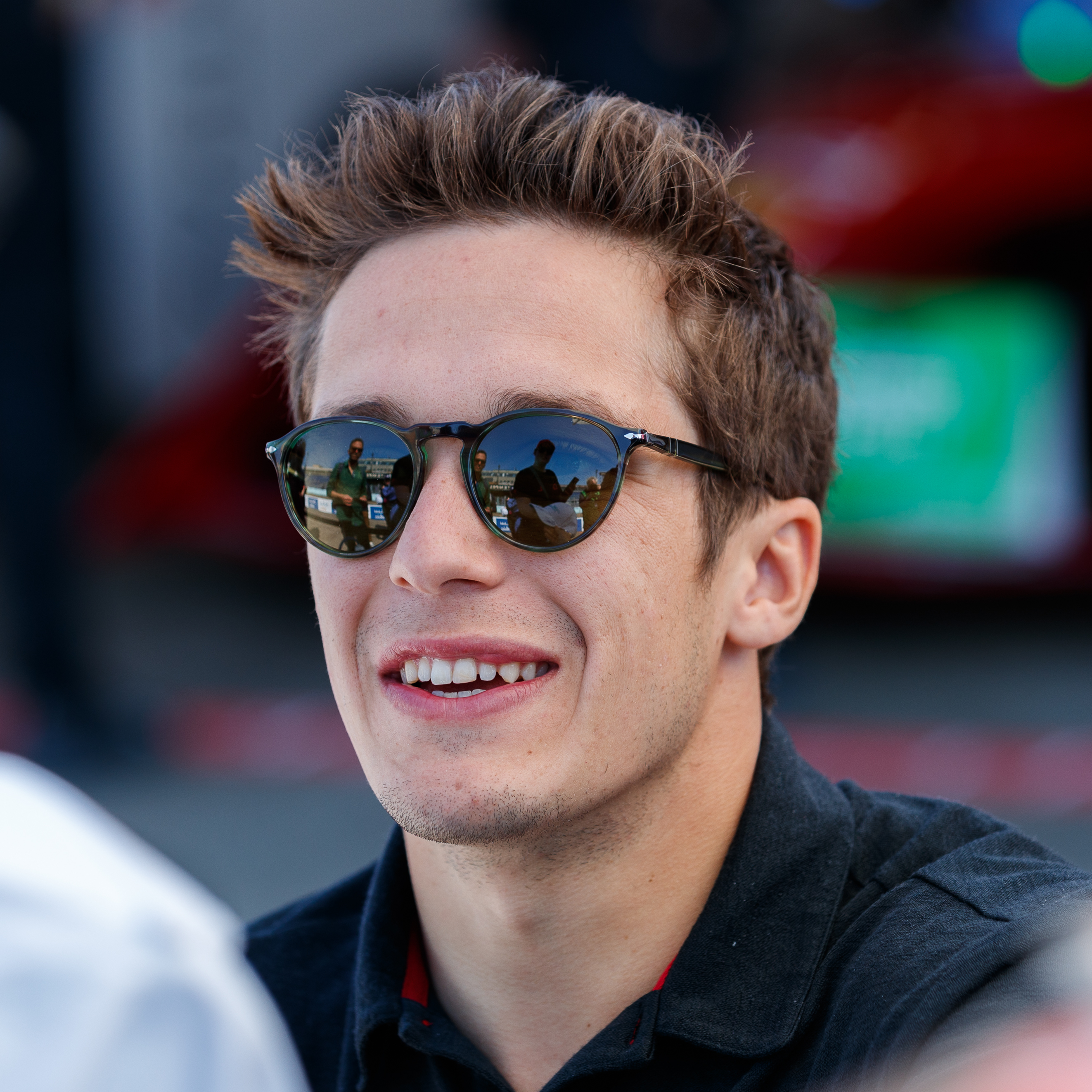
Fenestraz in 2023

=== Dragon / Penske Autosport (2022) ===
==== 2021–22 season ====
In August 2022, Fenestraz made his Formula E debut in the second Seoul ePrix, replacing Antonio Giovinazzi who suffered a hand injury in the previous race.

=== Nissan Formula E Team (2023–2024) ===
==== 2022–23 season ====
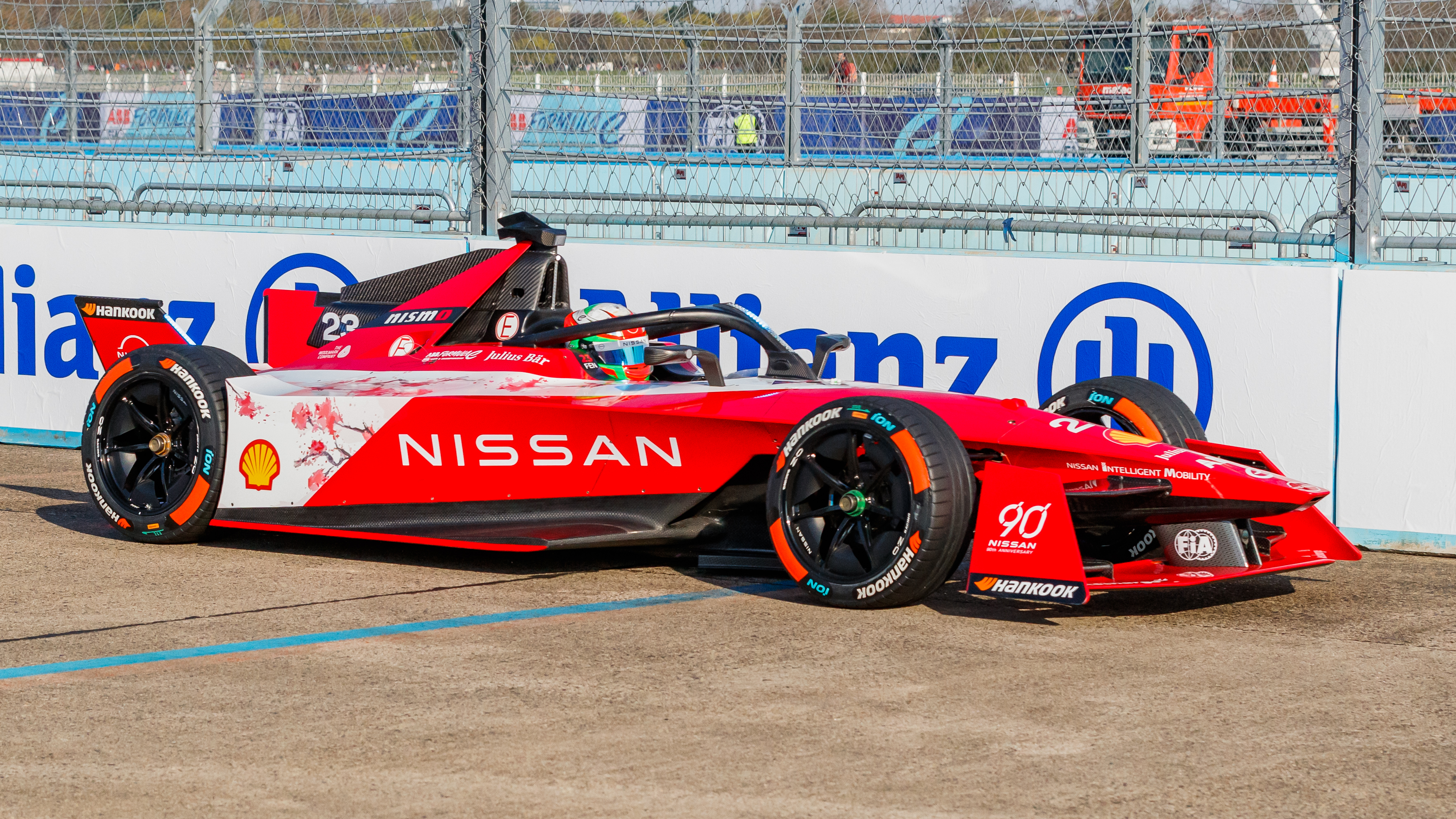
Fenestraz at the 2023 Berlin ePrix.

Fenestraz entered Formula E on a full-time basis in the 2022–23 season, partnering Norman Nato at Nissan. The year began promisingly, with the Frenchman getting into the knockout stage of qualifying for the season-opening Mexico City ePrix, although he would fall back during the race. At the next event in Diriyah, Fenestraz scored his first points in the series with an eighth place in the second race, which he stated he was "pleased" about. The French driver qualified in fourth for the Hyderabad ePrix two weeks later, but would miss out on a chance at points after becoming stuck between the two Jaguar Racing cars, which had crashed just in front of Fenestraz. During the following round in Cape Town, Fenestraz took his maiden pole position in the series, beating Maximilian Günther in the final stage and setting the fastest ever Formula E lap in the process. During the race however, Fenestraz fell down to third before being collided into by Nick Cassidy on the final lap, hitting the barriers which would result in a 14th-placed finish. At the Monaco ePrix, Fenestraz initially took pole position but was later demoted to second position for exceeding his power limit in his final run. Fenestraz ended the season 16th in the standings, six spots behind teammate Nato.

==== 2023–24 season ====
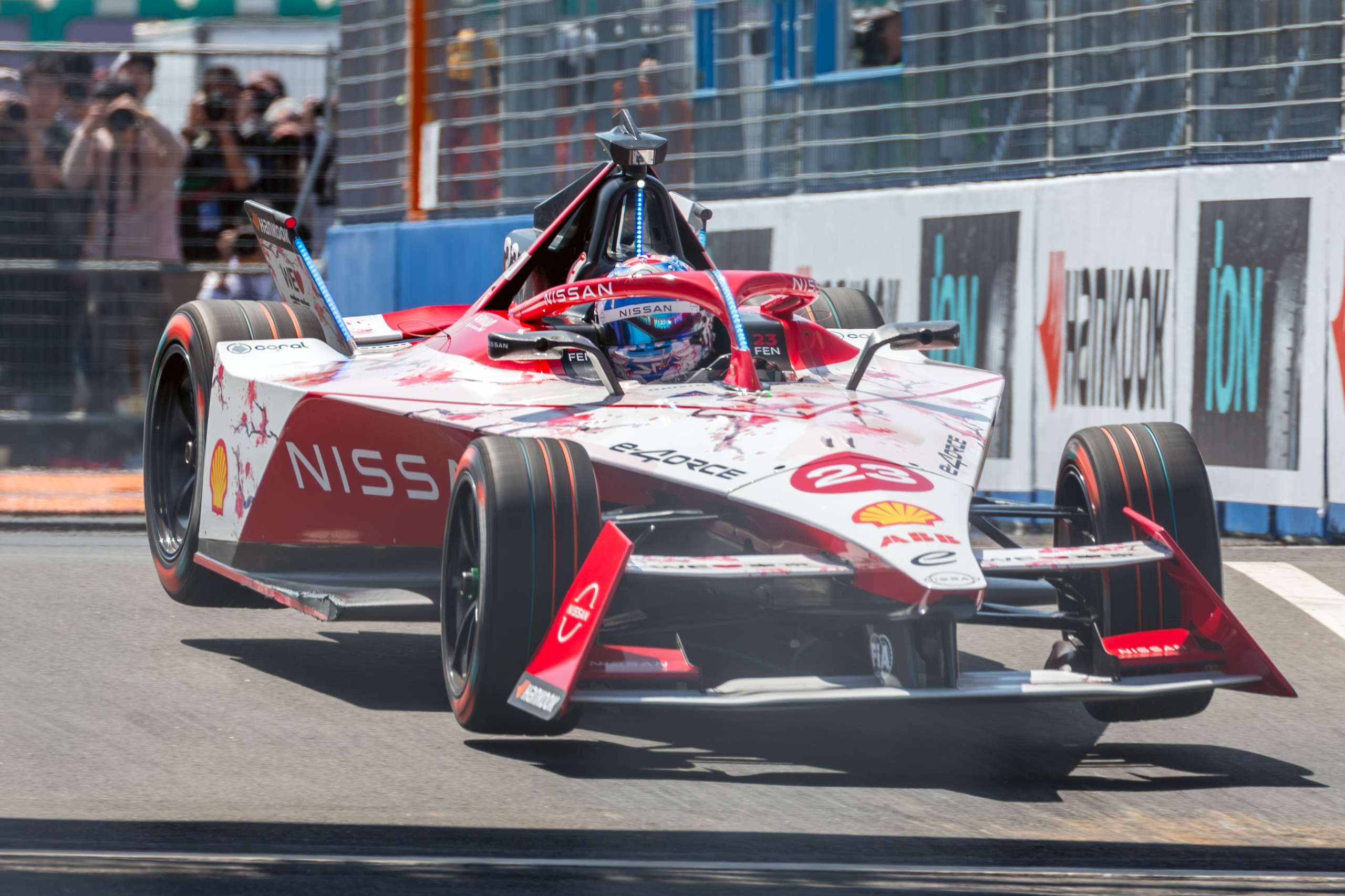
Fenestraz at the 2024 Tokyo ePrix

Fenestraz was kept by Nissan for the 2023–24 season to partner Oliver Rowland. After acquiring an Argentine racing licence in early 2023, Fenestraz intended to compete under its flag, but it then emerged that FIA World Championship regulations stipulate that the flag displayed shall be that of the driver's passport, and not the racing licence. As Fenestraz was "still in the process of obtaining [his] Argentine passport", he continued to represent France. Fenestraz was 17th in the championship, while teammate Rowland won twice and finished 4th. At the end of the season, Nissan announced that it had dropped Fenestraz.

== Other racing ==
=== FIA World Endurance Championship ===
In November 2025, Fenestraz participated in the FIA World Endurance Championship rookie test with Toyota Gazoo Racing held at the Bahrain International Circuit, testing their Hypercar, the Toyota GR010 Hybrid.

== Personal life ==
Fenestraz shared a flat in Guildford with fellow racing driver Lando Norris.

== Racing record ==
=== Career summary ===
Season	Series	Team	Races	Wins	Poles	F/Laps	Podiums	Points	Position
2015	French F4 Championship	Auto Sport Academy	21	3	2	2	10	253	**2nd**
2016	Eurocup Formula Renault 2.0	Tech 1 Racing	15	2	2	1	3	119.5	5th
2016	Formula Renault 2.0 NEC	Tech 1 Racing	15	1	1	0	2	207	5th
2017	Formula Renault Eurocup	Josef Kaufmann Racing	23	7	9	5	17	367.5	**1st**
2017	Formula Renault NEC	Josef Kaufmann Racing	4	2	2	2	4	108	6th
2017	FIA Formula 3 European Championship	Carlin	3	0	0	0	0	1	20th
2017	Macau Grand Prix	Carlin	1	0	0	0	0	N/A	7th
2018	FIA Formula 3 European Championship	Carlin	30	1	2	1	3	121	11th
2018	Macau Grand Prix	Carlin	1	0	0	0	1	N/A	**3rd**
2018	GP3 Series	Arden International	4	0	0	0	0	0	24th
2019	Japanese Formula 3 Championship	B-Max Racing with Motopark	20	8	5	8	18	162	**1st**
2019	Super GT - GT300	Kondo Racing	8	0	1	0	1	46	6th
2019–20	Formula E	Panasonic Jaguar Racing	Test driver						
2020	Super GT	TGR Team au TOM'S	8	0	0	0	4	56	4th
2020	Super Formula	Kondo Racing	7	0	0	0	1	19	13th
2020–21	Formula E	Jaguar Racing	Reserve driver						
2021	Super GT	TGR Team KeePer TOM'S	3	0	0	0	1	18	17th
2021	Super Formula	Kondo Racing	2	0	0	0	0	4	17th
2021	Michelin Pilot Challenge - GS	TGR Riley Motorsports	1	0	0	0	0	260	44th
2021	Súper TC 2000	TGR YPF Infinia	1	0	0	0	0	0	NC†
2021–22	Formula E	Dragon / Penske Autosport	1	0	0	0	0	0	24th
2021–22	Formula E	Jaguar TCS Racing	Reserve driver						
2022	Super Formula	Kondo Racing	10	1	0	0	4	89	**2nd**
2022	Super GT	TGR Team KeePer TOM'S	8	1	0	1	2	43	6th
2022–23	Formula E	Nissan Formula E Team	16	0	1	0	0	32	16th
2023–24	Formula E	Nissan Formula E Team	16	0	0	0	0	26	17th
2025	Super GT - GT500	TGR Team SARD	8	0	0	1	2	52	5th
2025	Super Formula	Vantelin Team TOM'S	12	1	1	0	2	50	8th
2026	Super GT - GT500	TGR Team SARD	8	0	0	0	1	44	8th
2026	Super Formula	Vantelin Team TOM'S	10	1	0	0	1	40.5	9th*

^{†} As Fenestraz was a guest driver, he was ineligible to score points.
^{*} Season still in progress.

=== Complete French F4 Championship results ===
(key) (Races in bold indicate pole position) (Races in italics indicate fastest lap)

Year	1	2	3	4	5	6	7	8	9	10	11	12	13	14	15	16	17	18	19	20	21	Pos	Points
2015	LÉD; 1; 8	LÉD; 2; 1	LÉD; 3; 8	LMS; 1; 2	LMS; 2; 4	LMS; 3; 8	**PAU**; **1**; 1	PAU; 2 Ret	**PAU**; **3**; 1	HUN; 1; 3	HUN; 2; 9	HUN; 3; 3	MAG; 1; 2	MAG; 2 Ret	MAG; 3; 4	NAV; 1; 5	NAV; 2; 3	NAV; 3; 8	LEC; 1; 2	LEC; 2; 5	LEC; 3; 3	2nd	253

=== Complete Formula Renault Eurocup results ===
(key) (Races in bold indicate pole position) (Races in italics indicate fastest lap)

Year	Team	1	2	3	4	5	6	7	8	9	10	11	12	13	14	15	16	17	18	19	20	21	22	23	Pos	Points
2016	Tech 1 Racing	ALC; 1 Ret	ALC; 2; 14	ALC; 3; 15	**MON**; **1**; 1	MNZ; 1; 4	MNZ; 2; 3	MNZ; 1; 8	RBR; 1; 13	RBR; 2; 10	LEC; 1; 6	LEC; 2; 5	SPA; 1; 4	SPA; 2; 4	EST; 1; 7	**EST**; **2**; 1									5th	119.5
2017	Josef Kaufmann Racing	MNZ; 1; 2	MNZ; 2; 2	SIL; 1; 5	SIL; 2 Ret	PAU; 1; 6	PAU; 2; 2	MON; 1; 2	**MON**; **2**; 1	HUN; 1; 2	**HUN**; **2**; 3	HUN; 3; 8	NÜR; 1; 3	**NÜR**; **2**; 1	RBR; 1; 2	**RBR**; **2**; 1	**LEC**; **1** Ret	LEC; 2; 1	**SPA**; **1**; 1	**SPA**; **2**; 3	**SPA**; **3**; 1	CAT; 1; 4	CAT; 2; 2	**CAT**; **3**; 1	1st	367.5

=== Complete Formula Renault 2.0 NEC results ===
(key) (Races in bold indicate pole position) (Races in italics indicate fastest lap)

Year	Entrant	1	2	3	4	5	6	7	8	9	10	11	12	13	14	15	DC	Points
2016	Tech 1 Racing	MNZ; 1; 7	MNZ; 2; 14	SIL; 1; 13	SIL; 2; 13	HUN; 1; 16	HUN; 2; 5	SPA; 1; 10	SPA; 2; 3	ASS; 1; 4	ASS; 2; 5	NÜR; 1; 6	NÜR; 2; 6	HOC; 1; 1	HOC; 2; 3	**HOC**; **3**; 16	5th	207
2017	Josef Kaufmann Racing	MNZ; 1	MNZ; 2	ASS; 1	ASS; 2	**NÜR**; **1**; 1	**NÜR**; **2**; 1	**SPA**; **1**; 1	**SPA**; **2**; 3	**SPA**; **3**; 1	HOC; 1; 2	HOC; 2; 2					6th	108

=== Complete FIA Formula 3 European Championship results ===
(key) (Races in bold indicate pole position) (Races in italics indicate fastest lap)

Year	Entrant	Engine	1	2	3	4	5	6	7	8	9	10	11	12	13	14	15	16	17	18	19	20	21	22	23	24	25	26	27	28	29	30	DC	Points
2017	Carlin	Volkswagen	SIL; 1	SIL; 2	SIL; 3	MNZ; 1	MNZ; 2	MNZ; 3	PAU; 1	PAU; 2	PAU; 3	HUN; 1	HUN; 2	HUN; 3	NOR; 1	NOR; 2	NOR; 3	SPA; 1	SPA; 2	SPA; 3	ZAN; 1	ZAN; 2	ZAN; 3	NÜR; 1; 15	NÜR; 2; 13	NÜR; 3; 10	RBR; 1	RBR; 2	RBR; 3	HOC; 1	HOC; 2	HOC; 3	20th	1
2018	Carlin	Volkswagen	PAU; 1; 4	**PAU**; **2**; 1	PAU; 3; 20	HUN; 1; 8	HUN; 2; 9	HUN; 3; 6	NOR; 1 Ret	NOR; 2; 8	NOR; 3 Ret	ZAN; 1; 17	ZAN; 2; 12	ZAN; 3; 18	SPA; 1; 11	SPA; 2; 7	SPA; 3; 15	**SIL**; **1**; 2	SIL; 2; 7	SIL; 3; 2	MIS; 1; 11	MIS; 2; 8	MIS; 3; 12	NÜR; 1; 12	NÜR; 2; 9	NÜR; 3; 7	RBR; 1; 11	RBR; 2; 16†	RBR; 3 Ret	HOC; 1; 7	HOC; 2 Ret	HOC; 3 Ret	11th	121

^{†} Driver did not finish the race, but was classified as he completed over 90% of the race distance.

=== Complete Macau Grand Prix results ===
Year	Team	Car	Qualifying	Quali Race	Main race
2017	(United Kingdom) Carlin	Dallara F317	11th	12th	7th
2018	(United Kingdom) Carlin	Dallara F317	**3rd**	4th	**3rd**

=== Complete GP3 Series results ===
(key) (Races in bold indicate pole position) (Races in italics indicate fastest lap)

Year	Entrant	1	2	3	4	5	6	7	8	9	10	11	12	13	14	15	16	17	18	Pos	Points
2018	Arden International	CAT; FEA	CAT; SPR	LEC; FEA	LEC; SPR	RBR; FEA	RBR; SPR	SIL; FEA	SIL; SPR	HUN; FEA	HUN; SPR	SPA; FEA	SPA; SPR	MNZ; FEA	MNZ; SPR	SOC; FEA; 16	SOC; SPR; 13	YMC; FEA; 16	YMC; SPR; 15	24th	0

=== Complete Japanese Formula 3 Championship results ===
(key) (Races in bold indicate pole position) (Races in italics indicate fastest lap)

Year	Entrant	Engine	1	2	3	4	5	6	7	8	9	10	11	12	13	14	15	16	17	18	19	20	Pos	Points
2019	B-Max Racing with Motopark	Volkswagen	SUZ; 1; 1	SUZ; 2; 14	**AUT**; **1**; 1	**AUT**; **2**; 1	AUT; 3; 1	**OKA**; **1**; 1	**OKA**; **2**; 2	OKA; 3; 2	SUG; 1; 3	SUG; 2; 2	FUJ; 1; 7	FUJ; 2; 1	SUG; 1; 2	SUG; 2; 2	SUG; 3; 2	**MOT**; **1**; 1	MOT; 2; 2	MOT; 3; 1	OKA; 1; 2	OKA; 2; 2	1st	162

=== Complete Super GT results ===
(key) (Races in bold indicate pole position; races in italics indicate fastest lap)

Year	Team	Car	Class	1	2	3	4	5	6	7	8	9	DC	Points
2019	Kondo Racing	Nissan GT-R Nismo GT3 (2018)	GT300	OKA; 5‡	**FUJ**; 4	SUZ; 18	CHA; 2	FUJ; 7	AUT; 8	SUG; 5	MOT; 6		6th	46
2020	TGR Team au TOM'S	Toyota GR Supra GT500	GT500	FUJ; 2	FUJ; 2	SUZ; 3	MOT; 11	FUJ; 12	SUZ; 7	MOT; 13	FUJ; 3		4th	56
2021	TGR Team KeePer TOM'S	Toyota GR Supra GT500	GT500	OKA	FUJ	SUZ	MOT	SUG	AUT; 9	MOT; 10	FUJ; 2		17th	18
2022	TGR Team KeePer TOM'S	Toyota GR Supra GT500	GT500	OKA; 11	FUJ; 14	SUZ; 3	FUJ; 1	SUZ; 8	SUG; 9	AUT; 9	MOT; 6		6th	43
2025	TGR Team SARD	Toyota GR Supra GT500	GT500	OKA; 3	FUJ; 5	SEP; 14	FS1; 5	FS2 (4)	SUZ; 6	SUG; 2	AUT; 12	MOT; 4	5th	52
2026	TGR Team SARD	Toyota GR Supra GT500	GT500	OKA; 5	FUJ; 4	FUJ; 8	SUZ; Ret	SUG; 2	AUT; 7	MOT; 4	MOT; DSQ		8th	44

^{‡} Half points awarded as less than 75% of race distance was completed.
^{(Number)} Driver did not take part in this sprint race, points are still awarded for the teammate's result.

=== Complete Super Formula results ===
(key) (Races in bold indicate pole position) (Races in italics indicate fastest lap)

Year	Team	Engine	1	2	3	4	5	6	7	8	9	10	11	12	DC	Points
2020	Kondo Racing	Toyota	MOT; 3^{2}	OKA; Ret^{3}	SUG; Ret^{3}	AUT; Ret	SUZ; 10	SUZ; Ret	FUJ; 8						13th	19
2021	Kondo Racing	Toyota	FUJ	SUZ	AUT	SUG	MOT	MOT; 13	SUZ; 7						17th	4
2022	Kondo Racing	Toyota	FUJ; 3	FUJ; 20	SUZ; 4^{3}	AUT; 2	SUG; 1^{2}	FUJ; Ret	MOT; 2^{2}	MOT; 6^{2}	SUZ; 16	SUZ; 4			2nd	89
2025	Vantelin Team TOM'S	Toyota	SUZ; 11	SUZ; 16	MOT; 8	MOT; 4	AUT; 17	FUJ; 13	FUJ; 5	SUG; 2^{2}	**FUJ**; 1‡^{1}	SUZ; 8	SUZ; 17	SUZ; 12	8th	50
2026	Vantelin Team TOM'S	Toyota	MOT; 6‡	MOT; Ret	SUZ; 1	SUZ; 7	FUJ; 11	FUJ; 5	FUJ; 13	SUG; 8	FUJ; 13	FUJ; 5	SUZ	SUZ	9th*	40.5*

^{‡} Half points awarded as less than 75% of race distance was completed.
^{*} Season still in progress.

=== Complete Formula E results ===
(key) (Races in bold indicate pole position; races in italics indicate fastest lap)

Year	Team	Chassis	Powertrain	1	2	3	4	5	6	7	8	9	10	11	12	13	14	15	16	Pos	Points
2021–22	Dragon / Penske Autosport	Spark SRT05e	Penske EV-5	DRH	DRH	MEX	RME	RME	MCO	BER	BER	JAK	MRK	NYC	NYC	LDN	LDN	SEO	SEO; 16	24th	0
2022–23	Nissan Formula E Team	Formula E Gen3	Nissan e-4ORCE 04	MEX; 15	DRH; 17	DRH; 8	HYD; 12	**CAP**; 14	SAP; Ret	BER; 12	BER; 11	MCO; 4	JAK; 19	JAK; 4	POR; 15	RME; 10	RME; Ret	LDN; Ret	LDN; 15	16th	32
2023–24	Nissan Formula E Team	Formula E Gen3	Nissan e-4ORCE 04	MEX; 12	DRH; Ret	DRH; 6	SAP; 11	TOK; 11	MIS; 9	MIS; 5	MCO; 8	BER; 9	BER; Ret	SIC; 11	SIC; 14	POR; 15	POR; 18	LDN; 14	LDN; 15	17th	26

== Notes ==
Sporting positions
Preceded by Lando Norris	Formula Renault Eurocup; Champion; 2017	Succeeded by Max Fewtrell
Preceded by Sho Tsuboi	Japanese Formula 3 Championship; Champion; 2019	Succeeded by Ritomo Miyata (Super Formula Lights)
