= Yifei Ye =

Chinese racing driver (born 2000)

- 叶一飞
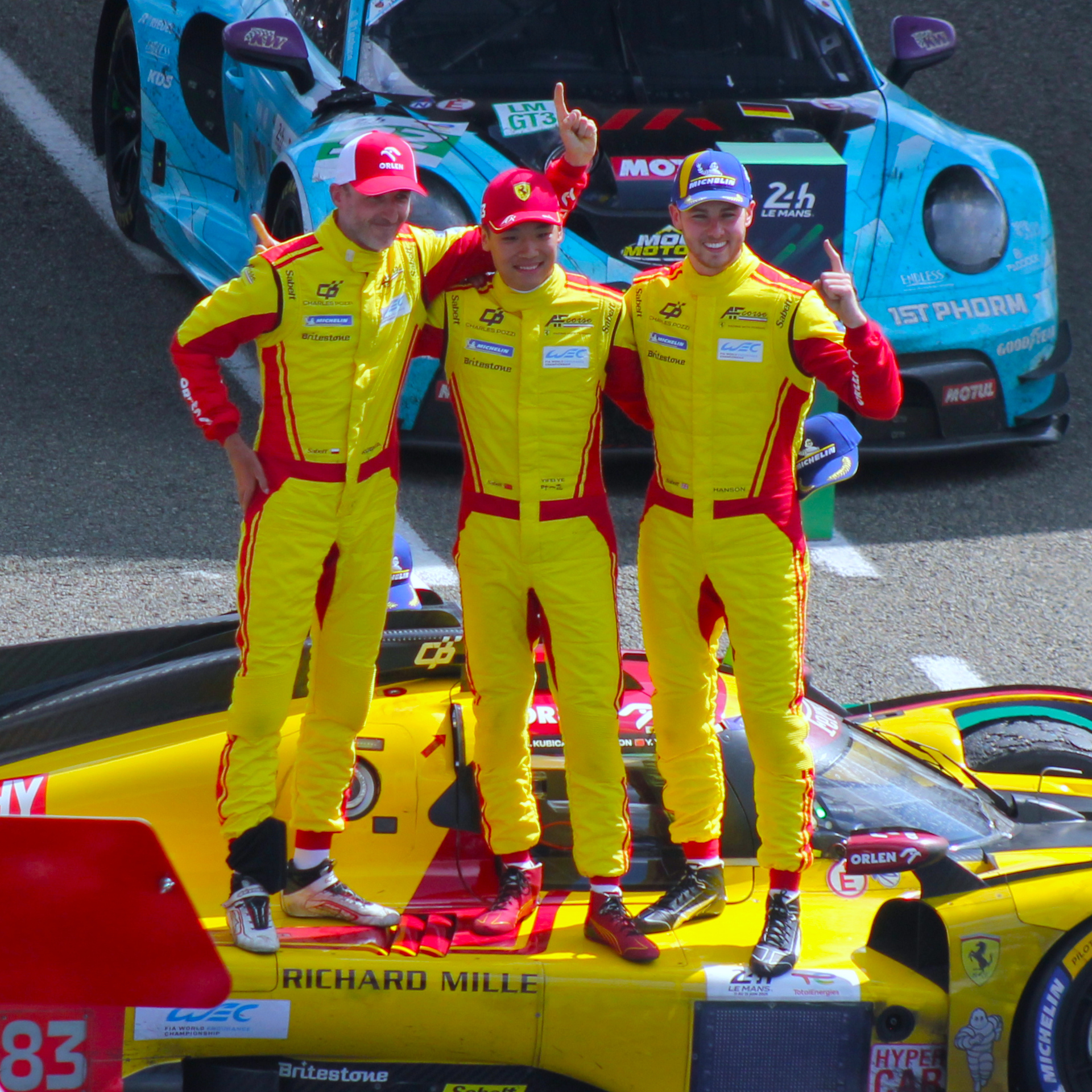
- Ye (middle) celebrating after winning the 2025 24 Hours of Le Mans
- Nationality: (China) Chinese
- Born: 16 June 2000 (age 26) Xi'an, Shaanxi, China

FIA World Endurance Championship career
- Debut season: 2023
- Current team: AF Corse
- Categorisation: FIA Silver (2021); FIA Gold (2022–2026); FIA Platinum (2027–)
- Car number: 83
- Former teams: Hertz Team Jota
- Starts: 31
- Wins: 2
- Podiums: 3
- Poles: 1
- Fastest laps: 0
- Best finish: 2nd in 2025 (LMH)

24 Hours of Le Mans career
- Years: 2021–2025
- Teams: Team WRT, Cool Racing, Hertz Team Jota, AF Corse
- Best finish: 1st (2025)
- Class wins: 1 (2025)

Previous series
- 2021–2022; 2021–2022; 2020; 2019; 2019; 2017–2018; 2017–2018; 2015–2016; 2015–2016: ELMS; ALMS; Euroformula Open; FIA Formula 3; F3 Asian Winter; Formula Renault Eurocup; Formula Renault NEC; Italian F4; French F4

Championship titles
- 2021; 2021; 2020; 2016: ELMS - LMP2; ALMS - LMP2; Euroformula Open; French F4

Chinese name
- Simplified Chinese: 叶一飞
- Traditional Chinese: 葉一飛
- Hanyu Pinyin: Yè Yīfēi
- IPA: [jê í.féɪ]

Yifei Ye (Chinese: 叶一飞; born 16 June 2000) is a Chinese racing driver who competes in the FIA World Endurance Championship for AF Corse as a Ferrari factory driver.

Ye began his career in single-seater racing. He won French F4 in 2016, reached FIA Formula 3 as a Renault junior, and won Euroformula Open in 2020. He then moved to sports car racing for 2021, and was picked by Porsche Motorsport Asia Pacific as a Selected Driver. Ye was also crowned European Le Mans Series champion for Team WRT in 2021. After two seasons in LMP2, Ye graduated to Hypercar with Hertz Team Jota in 2023.

Ye signed for Ferrari as factory driver in 2024, and was placed in AF Corse's No. 83 car in the FIA World Endurance Championship. Ye won the 2025 24 Hours of Le Mans alongside Robert Kubica and Phil Hanson, becoming the first Chinese driver to take an overall victory in the event.

== Early career ==
Born on 16 June 2000 in Xi'an City in the Shaanxi Province of China, Ye began his professional racing career in karting in 2010 at the age of ten, and would go on to win the China Karting Championship in 2011 and 2012. Ye would make his European racing debut in 2013 at the ROK Cup final in Lonato, finishing fourth overall in the Junior ROK class. His karting career concluded in early 2015 with a second-place finish in the Vega International Winter Trophy, in preparation for his step up to Formula 4.

== Single-seater career ==
=== Formula 4 ===
In 2015, Ye graduated to single-seaters in the French F4 Championship, where two wins near the end of the campaign brought him to twelfth in the standings.

The following year would see Ye return to French F4. He would go on to dominate the season, taking pole position in nearly every qualifying session and winning fourteen races. His final points tally saw him take the championship title by 142 points over runner-up Gilles Magnus - marking the largest winning margin in championship history, and the first title for a Chinese driver in Formula 4.

=== Formula Renault Eurocup ===
In December 2016, it was announced that Ye would graduate to the Formula Renault Eurocup with reigning teams' champions Josef Kaufmann Racing. He would go on to take three podium finishes on his way to the eighth place in the drivers' standings. Ye reunited with Josef Kaufmann the following season, claiming two wins at Monza and the Hungaroring to finish the championship in third overall.

=== Formula One ===
Following his performance in the Formula Renault Eurocup, Ye was signed to the Renault Sport Academy in April 2019.

=== FIA Formula 3 Championship ===
In October 2018, Ye joined the final round of the F3 Asian Championship with Absolute Racing, where he claimed two podiums out of three races. Ye rejoined the outfit for the following year's Winter Series, where he claimed four wins to finish second in the championship.

2019 saw Ye enter the inaugural season of the FIA Formula 3 Championship with Hitech Grand Prix alongside Leonardo Pulcini and Red Bull junior Jüri Vips. In the final race in Sochi, he scored his best result of sixth place.

=== Euroformula Open Championship ===
In May 2020, Ye joined CryptoTower Racing in the Euroformula Open championship. He would go on to dominate the championship, taking clean sweeps at the Hungaroring, Red Bull Ring, and Catalunya rounds for a total of 11 wins, 13 poles and 12 fastest laps.

=== Formula E ===
In April 2023, Ye was announced to participate in the official rookie test at Berlin for the TAG Heuer Porsche Formula E Team in the Porsche 99X Electric. Ye was able to find a good rhythm and managed to provide a valuable feedback to the engineers on the setup of the Porsche 99X Electric. Additionally, following his successful Berlin rookie test, Ye was set to return to the cockpit of the Porsche 99X Electric for the Rome E-Prix Rookie Free Practice.

== Sportscar career ==
=== 2021: Rookie season ===
At the start of 2021, Ye made his sportscar racing debut with G-Drive Racing, partnering René Binder and Ferdinand Habsburg in the LMP2 category of the Asian Le Mans Series. Having taken a pair of victories at the opening round and consolidated their championship gap during the final two races, the trio claimed the ALMS title.

For his main campaign, Ye would drive for Team WRT alongside Louis Delétraz and Robert Kubica in the European Le Mans Series. The team started off in controlling fashion, winning the opening pair of races at Barcelona and Spielberg and gaining an early lead in the standings. After two finishes inside the top-five, Ye and his teammates took victory at Spa-Francorchamps, thus clinching the ELMS championship with a round to go.

==== 24 Hours of Le Mans ====
In August 2021, Ye joined his ELMS teammates Delétraz and Kubica at Team WRT to compete in the 24 Hours of Le Mans. Ye completed the most overtakes in the LMP2 class, with a total of 315 passes, and led the race for much of its concluding phase. However, the car would experience an electrical failure on the very last lap of the race, forcing Ye to retire from the lead and leading to the squad being unclassified in the final results.

==== Promotion to Porsche Motorsport ====
In October 2021, Ye signed with Porsche as Porsche Motorsport Asian Pacific Selected Driver, becoming Porsche's first-ever official Chinese driver in preparation for a potential role in the upcoming Porsche LMDh program.

=== 2022 ===
==== GT debut in Asian Le Mans Series ====
Ye returned to the Asian Le Mans Series in the GT3 class for 2022, making his debut in GT racing and fulfilling his duties as a newly signed driver for Porsche Motorsport Asia Pacific. A pole position and a second-place finish in the final round was enough to elevate the team to eighth in the standings.

==== Cool Racing (European Le Mans Series) ====
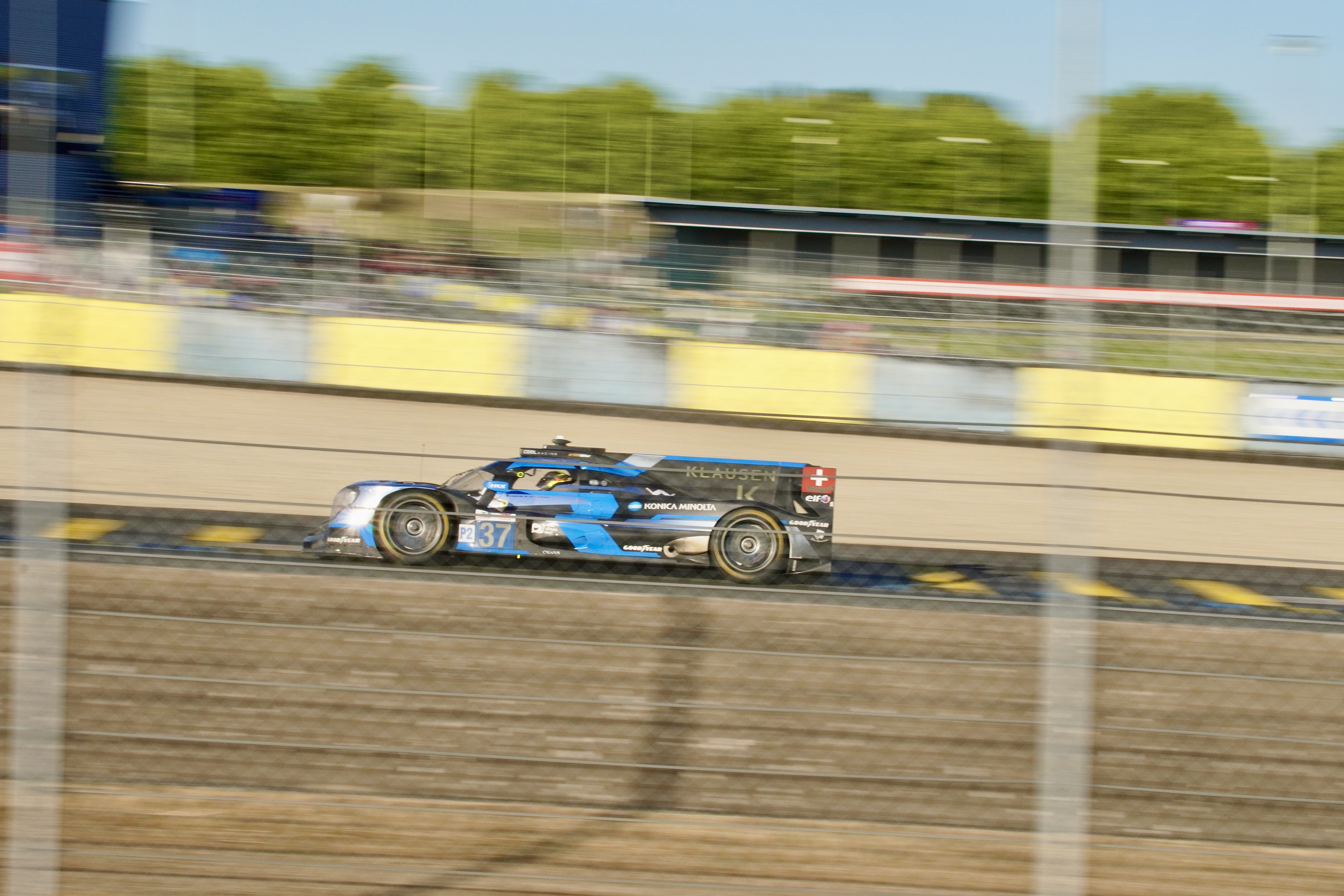
The Oreca 07 entered by Cool Racing driven by Ye, Ricky Taylor and Niklas Krütten

In February 2022, Cool Racing announced its driver line-up for 2022. Reigning European Le Mans Series LMP2 Champion Ye along with the four-time winner in Le Mans Nicolas Lapierre and 2021 European Le Mans Series LMP3 runner up Niklas Krütten. The team also entered the car in the 2022 24 Hours of Le Mans with a revised line-up due to Lapierre's commitments with Alpine in the FIA WEC. He was replaced by double IMSA champion Ricky Taylor. Ye took the pole position at Spa-Francorchamps and three podiums throughout the championship.

=== 2023: First full WEC campaign in the top class ===
==== FIA World Endurance Championship ====
In 2023, Ye was announced to be making his debut in the top-flight Hypercar class of the FIA World Endurance Championship as the youngest driver in the Hypercar class, partnering António Félix da Costa and Will Stevens in the customer Porsche 963 of Hertz Team Jota. The team would make an impressive debut at the third championship round at Spa-Francorchamps, finishing sixth. At the 100th running of the 24 Hours of Le Mans, Ye and his teammates would complete an impressive run from last to first during the first half of the race, though this would end after Ye crashed at the Porsche curves. Following repairs, Ye and Jota managed to end up completing the race. In the final three races, the team would amass a trio of top-ten finishes, with a highlight coming in Bahrain, where the trio finished in fourth place.

=== 2024: Switch to Ferrari ===
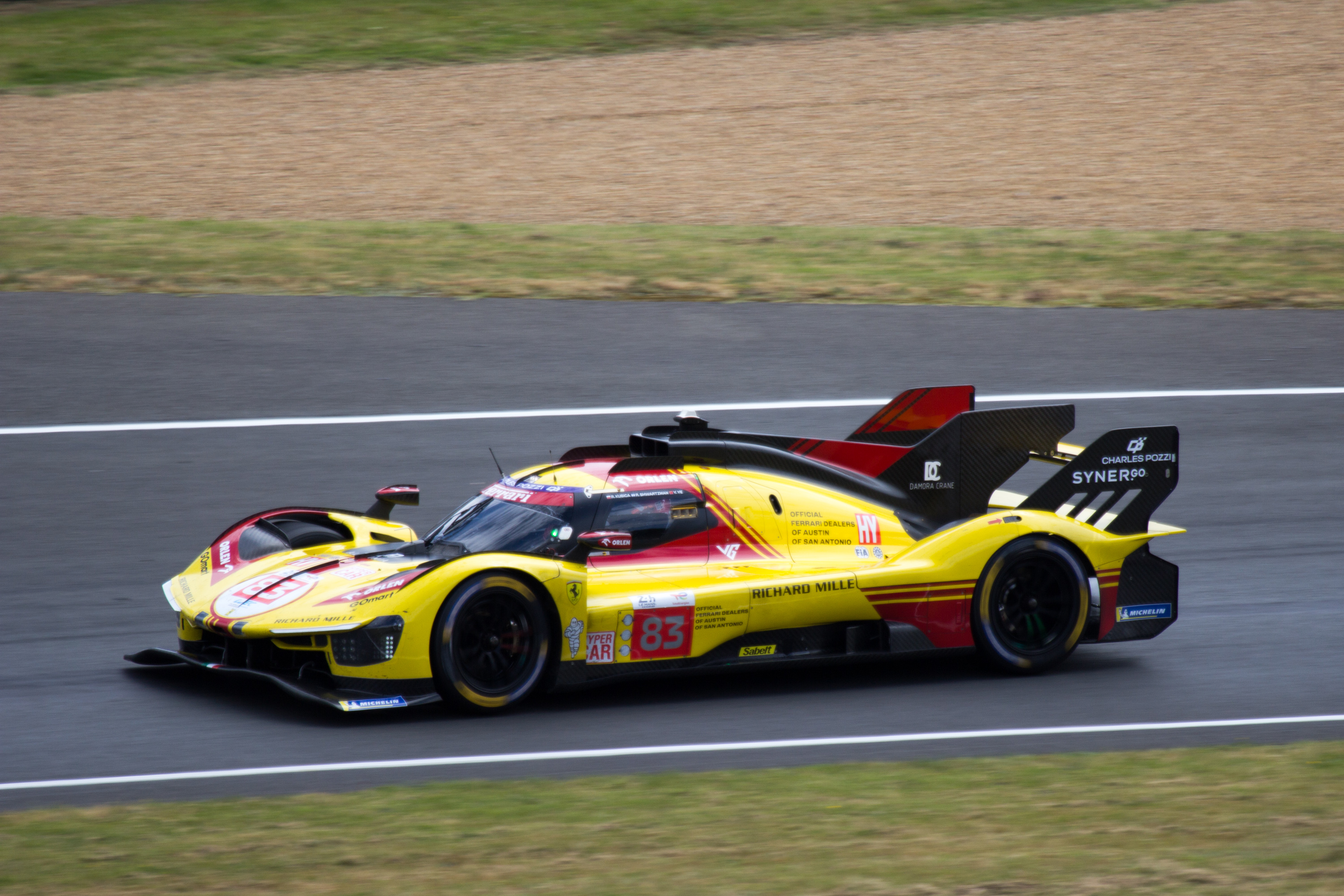
Ye driving the No. 83 Ferrari 499P at the 2024 24 Hours of Le Mans

In lieu of the 2024 season, Ye announced that he would be leaving the Porsche stable, soon revealing that he had signed a factory contract with Ferrari.

Ye and his No. 83 teammates Robert Shwartzman and Robert Kubica took the overall victory of the 2024 Lone Star Le Mans.

== Karting record ==
=== Karting career summary ===
Season	Series	Team	Position
2013	ROK Cup International Final — Junior ROK		28th
2014	South Garda Winter Cup — KF3		17th
2014	WSK Champions Cup — KFJ	ART Grand Prix	19th
2014	CIK-FIA European Championship — KFJ	ART Grand Prix	48th
2014	ROK Cup International Final — Junior ROK	International Kartronix	4th
2015	WSK Champions Cup — KFJ	Kartonix International	25th
2015	South Garda Winter Cup — KFJ	Kartonix International	NC
2015	Vega International Winter Trophy — KFJ	Kartonix International	2nd
2015	WSK Super Master Series — KFJ	RB Racing	12th
2015	CIK-FIA European Championship — KFJ	RB Racing	46th

== Racing record ==
=== Racing career summary ===
Season	Series	Team	Races	Wins	Poles	F. Laps	Podiums	Points	Position
2015	French F4 Championship	Auto Sport Academy	21	2	0	0	2	73	12th
2015	Italian F4 Championship	RB Racing	15	0	0	0	0	10	21st
2016	French F4 Championship	FFSA Academy	23	14	10	17	15	420	**1st**
2016	Italian F4 Championship	Kfzteile24 Mücke Motorsport	18	0	0	2	2	79	10th
2017	Formula Renault Eurocup	Josef Kaufmann Racing	23	0	0	1	3	106.5	8th
2017	Formula Renault NEC	Josef Kaufmann Racing	7	2	2	2	4	104	8th
2018	Formula Renault Eurocup	Josef Kaufmann Racing	20	2	1	3	10	239	**3rd**
2018	Formula Renault NEC	Josef Kaufmann Racing	8	0	0	0	0	0	NC†
2018	F3 Asian Championship	Absolute Racing	3	0	0	0	2	37	11th
2019	FIA Formula 3 Championship	Hitech Grand Prix	16	0	0	0	0	4	21st
2019	F3 Asian Winter Series	Absolute Racing	9	4	2	5	7	154	**2nd**
2020	Euroformula Open Championship	CryptoTower Racing	18	11	12	12	16	369	**1st**
2021	European Le Mans Series - LMP2	Team WRT	6	3	0	1	4	118	**1st**
2021	24 Hours of Le Mans - LMP2	Team WRT	1	0	0	0	0	N/A	NC
2021	Asian Le Mans Series - LMP2	G-Drive Racing	4	2	1	0	3	81	**1st**
2022	European Le Mans Series - LMP2	Cool Racing	6	0	1	0	3	70	5th
2022	24 Hours of Le Mans - LMP2	Cool Racing	1	0	0	0	0	N/A	7th
2022	Asian Le Mans Series - GT	Herberth Motorsport	4	0	1	1	1	21.5	8th
2023	FIA World Endurance Championship - Hypercar	Hertz Team Jota	5	0	0	0	0	38	9th
2023	24 Hours of Le Mans - Hypercar	Hertz Team Jota	1	0	0	0	0	N/A	13th
2023	FIA World Endurance Championship - LMP2	Hertz Team Jota	2	1	0	0	1	0	NC†
2024	FIA World Endurance Championship - Hypercar	AF Corse	8	1	0	0	1	57	9th
2024	24 Hours of Le Mans - Hypercar	AF Corse	1	0	0	0	0	N/A	DNF
2024	GT World Challenge Europe Endurance Cup	AF Corse - Francorchamps Motors	1	0	0	0	0	0	NC
2024	FIA GT World Cup	Harmony Racing	1	0	0	0	0	N/A	11th
2025	FIA World Endurance Championship - Hypercar	AF Corse	8	1	1	0	2	117	**2nd**
2025	24 Hours of Le Mans - Hypercar	AF Corse	1	1	0	0	1	N/A	**1st**
2025	GT World Challenge Europe Endurance Cup	AF Corse - Francorchamps Motors	1	0	0	0	0	0	NC
2025	GT World Challenge Asia	Winhere Harmony Racing	4	1	0	0	1	25	23th
2025	FIA GT World Cup	Harmony Racing	1	0	0	0	0	N/A	5th
2026	IMSA SportsCar Championship - GTD	Triarsi Competizione	1	0	0	0	0	260	65th
2026	FIA World Endurance Championship - Hypercar	AF Corse	8	0	0	0	0	49	14th
2026	International GT Open	AF Corse	1	0	0	0	0	0	75th
2026	FIA GT World Cup	Winhere Harmony Racing							
2026–27	Asian Le Mans Series - Hypercar	AF Corse							

^{†} As Ye was a guest driver, he was ineligible for points.
^{*} Season still in progress.

=== Complete French F4 Championship results ===
(key) (Races in bold indicate pole position) (Races in italics indicate fastest lap)

Year	1	2	3	4	5	6	7	8	9	10	11	12	13	14	15	16	17	18	19	20	21	22	23	Pos	Points
2015	LÉD; 1; 18	LÉD; 2; 11	LÉD; 3; 11	LMS; 1; 13	LMS; 2; 10	LMS; 3; 7	PAU; 1; 10	PAU; 2; 5	PAU; 3 Ret	HUN; 1; 14	HUN; 2; 14	HUN; 3; 11	MAG; 1; 13	MAG; 2 Ret	MAG; 3; 11	NAV; 1; 9	NAV; 2; 1	NAV; 3; 12	LEC; 1; 9	LEC; 2; 1	LEC; 3; 12			12th	73
2016	**LEC**; **1**; 1	LEC; 2; 1	**LEC**; **3**; 1	LEC; 4; 1	**PAU**; **1**; 3	PAU; 2; 4	**PAU**; **3**; 1	PAU; 4; 1	**LÉD**; **1**; 1	LÉD; 2; 1	**LÉD**; **3**; 1	LÉD; 4; 1	**MAG**; **1**; 1	MAG; 2; 7	**MAG**; **3**; 1	MAG; 4; 1	**LMS**; **1**; 1	LMS; 2; 15	**LMS**; **3** Ret	LMS; 4; 11	CAT; 1; 4	CAT; 2; 12	CAT; 3; 15	1st	420

=== Complete Italian F4 Championship results ===
(key) (Races in bold indicate pole position) (Races in italics indicate fastest lap)

Year	Team	1	2	3	4	5	6	7	8	9	10	11	12	13	14	15	16	17	18	19	20	21	22	23	Pos	Points
2015	RB Racing	VAL; 1	VAL; 2	VAL; 3	MNZ; 1	MNZ; 2	MNZ; 3	IMO1; 1; 15	IMO1; 2 Ret	IMO1; 3; 11	MUG; 1; 19	MUG; 2; 17	MUG; 3 Ret	ADR; 1; 14	ADR; 2 Ret	ADR; 3; 19	IMO2; 1; 7	IMO2; 2; 18	IMO2; 3; 11	MIS; 1; 12	MIS; 2; 9	MIS; 3; 8			21st	10
2016	Kfzteile24 Mücke Motorsport	MIS; 1	MIS; 2; 20	MIS; 3 Ret	MIS; 4 DNQ	ADR; 1	ADR; 2; 2	ADR; 3 DSQ	ADR; 4; 2	IMO1; 1; 7	IMO1; 2; 4	IMO1; 3; 7	MUG; 1; 28	MUG; 2; 7	MUG; 3; 7	VAL; 1	VAL; 2	VAL; 3	IMO2; 1; 8	IMO2; 2; 22	IMO2; 3; 17	MNZ; 1; 5	MNZ; 2; 9	MNZ; 3 Ret	10th	79

=== Complete Formula Renault NEC results ===
(key) (Races in bold indicate pole position) (Races in italics indicate fastest lap)

Year	Entrant	1	2	3	4	5	6	7	8	9	10	11	12	DC	Points
2017	Josef Kaufmann Racing	MNZ; 1	MNZ; 2	ASS; 1	ASS; 2	NÜR; 1; 2	NÜR; 2; 3	SPA; 1; 3	SPA; 2; 7	SPA; 3; 8	**HOC**; **1**; 1	**HOC**; **2**; 1		8th	104
2018	Josef Kaufmann Racing	PAU; 1	PAU; 2	MNZ; 1	MNZ; 2	SPA; 1; 2	SPA; 2; 3	HUN; 1; 1	HUN; 2; 11	NÜR; 1; 6	NÜR; 2; 6	HOC; 1; 2	HOC; 2; 3	NC†	0

† As Ye was a guest driver, he was ineligible points

=== Complete Formula Renault Eurocup results ===
(key) (Races in bold indicate pole position) (Races in italics indicate fastest lap)

Year	Team	1	2	3	4	5	6	7	8	9	10	11	12	13	14	15	16	17	18	19	20	21	22	23	Pos	Points
2017	Josef Kaufmann Racing	MNZ; 1; 9	MNZ; 2; 6	SIL; 1; 9	SIL; 2; 14	PAU; 1; 8	PAU; 2; 10	MON; 1; 11	MON; 2; 19	HUN; 1; 24	HUN; 2; 7	HUN; 3; 5	NÜR; 1; 7	NÜR; 2; 3	RBR; 1; 8	RBR; 2; 7	LEC; 1; 2	LEC; 2; 8	SPA; 1; 3	SPA; 2; 7	SPA; 3; 8	CAT; 1; 12	CAT; 2; 10	CAT; 3; 11	8th	106.5
2018	Josef Kaufmann Racing	LEC; 1; 3	LEC; 2; 2	**MNZ**; **1**; 1	MNZ; 2; 15	SIL; 1; 3	SIL; 2; 3	MON; 1; 4	MON; 2; 4	RBR; 1; 8	RBR; 2; 5	SPA; 1; 2	SPA; 2; 3	HUN; 1; 1	HUN; 2; 11	NÜR; 1; 6	NÜR; 2; 6	HOC; 1; 2	HOC; 2; 3	CAT; 1; 8	CAT; 2; 8				3rd	239

=== Complete F3 Asian Winter Series results ===
(key) (Races in bold indicate pole position) (Races in italics indicate fastest lap)

Year	Team	1	2	3	4	5	6	7	8	9	Pos	Points
2019	Absolute Racing	CHA; 1 Ret	CHA; 2; 2	CHA; 3; 1	SEP1; 1; 2	SEP1; 2; 2	SEP1; 3; 1	**SEP2**; **1**; 1	SEP2; 2; 1	**SEP2**; **3**; 13†	2nd	155

=== Complete FIA Formula 3 Championship results ===
(key) (Races in bold indicate pole position; races in italics indicate points for the fastest lap of top ten finishers)

Year	Entrant	1	2	3	4	5	6	7	8	9	10	11	12	13	14	15	16	DC	Points
2019	Hitech Grand Prix	CAT; FEA; 22	CAT; SPR; Ret	LEC; FEA; 13	LEC; SPR; 22	RBR; FEA; 20	RBR; SPR; Ret	SIL; FEA; 12	SIL; SPR; 11	HUN; FEA; 18	HUN; SPR; 22	SPA; FEA; 15	SPA; SPR; 10	MNZ; FEA; Ret	MNZ; SPR; 19	SOC; FEA; 13	SOC; SPR; 6	21st	4

=== Complete Euroformula Open Championship results ===
(key) (Races in bold indicate pole position) (Races in italics indicate fastest lap)

Year	Team	1	2	3	4	5	6	7	8	9	10	11	12	13	14	15	16	17	18	Pos	Points
2020	CryptoTower Racing	**HUN**; **1**; 1	**HUN**; **2**; 1	LEC; 1; 2	**LEC**; **2**; 1	**RBR**; **1**; 1	**RBR**; **2**; 1	**MNZ**; **1**; 1	MNZ; 2; 2	**MNZ**; **3**; 2	MUG; 1; 5	MUG; 2; 3	SPA; 1; 1	SPA; 2; 11	**SPA**; **3**; 3	**CAT**; **1**; 1	**CAT**; **2**; 1	**CAT**; **3**; 1	**CAT**; **4**; 1	1st	369

=== Complete Asian Le Mans Series results ===
(key) (Races in bold indicate pole position) (Races in italics indicate fastest lap)

Year	Team	Class	Car	Engine	1	2	3	4	5	6	Pos.	Points
2021	G-Drive Racing	LMP2	Aurus 01	Gibson GK428 4.2 L V8	DUB; 1; 1	DUB; 2; 1	ABU; 1; 2	**ABU**; **2**; 4			1st	81
2022	Herberth Motorsport	GT	Porsche 911 GT3 R	Porsche 4.0 L Flat-6	DUB; 1; 12	DUB; 2 Ret	ABU; 1; 17	**ABU**; **2**; 2			8th	20
2026–27	AF Corse	Hypercar	Ferrari 499P	Ferrari F163CG 3.0 L Turbo V6	LEC; 1; 1	**LEC**; **2**; 1	JER; 1	JER; 2	ALG; 1	ALG; 2	1st*	51*

=== Complete European Le Mans Series results ===
(key) (Races in bold indicate pole position; results in italics indicate fastest lap)

Year	Entrant	Class	Chassis	Engine	1	2	3	4	5	6	Rank	Points
2021	Team WRT	LMP2	Oreca 07	Gibson GK428 4.2 L V8	CAT; 1	RBR; 1	LEC; 5	MNZ; 4	SPA; 1	ALG; 2	1st	118
2022	Cool Racing	LMP2	Oreca 07	Gibson GK428 4.2 L V8	LEC; 5	IMO; 3	MNZ; 8	CAT; 3	**SPA**; 5	ALG; 3	5th	70

=== Complete 24 Hours of Le Mans results ===
Year	Team	Co-Drivers	Car	Class	Laps	Pos.	Class Pos.
2021	(Belgium) Team WRT	(Switzerland) Louis Delétraz (Poland) Robert Kubica	Oreca 07-Gibson	LMP2	362	NC	NC
2022	(Switzerland) Cool Racing	(Germany) Niklas Krütten (United States) Ricky Taylor	Oreca 07-Gibson	LMP2	367	11th	7th
2023	(United Kingdom) Hertz Team Jota	(Portugal) António Félix da Costa (United Kingdom) Will Stevens	Porsche 963	Hypercar	244	40th	13th
2024	(Italy) AF Corse	(Poland) Robert Kubica (Israel) Robert Shwartzman	Ferrari 499P	Hypercar	248	DNF	DNF
2025	(Italy) AF Corse	(United Kingdom) Phil Hanson (Poland) Robert Kubica	Ferrari 499P	Hypercar	387	**1st**	**1st**
2026	(Italy) AF Corse	(United Kingdom) Phil Hanson (Poland) Robert Kubica	Ferrari 499P	Hypercar	381	7th	7th

=== Complete FIA World Endurance Championship results ===
(key) (Races in bold indicate pole position; races in italics indicate fastest lap)

Year	Entrant	Class	Chassis	Engine	1	2	3	4	5	6	7	8	Rank	Points
2023	Hertz Team Jota	LMP2	Oreca 07	Gibson GK428 4.2 L V8	SEB; 1	ALG; 5							NC	0‡
2023	Hertz Team Jota	Hypercar	Porsche 963	Porsche 9RD 4.6 L Turbo V8			SPA; 6	LMS; 10	MNZ; 9	FUJ; 6	BHR; 4		9th	38
2024	AF Corse	Hypercar	Ferrari 499P	Ferrari F163CG 3.0 L Turbo V6	QAT; 4	IMO; 8	SPA; 8	LMS; Ret	SÃO; 11	COA; 1	FUJ; 12	BHR; 8	9th	57
2025	AF Corse	Hypercar	Ferrari 499P	Ferrari F163CG 3.0 L Turbo V6	QAT; 2	IMO; 4	SPA; 15	LMS; 1	SÃO; 8	**COA**; 7	FUJ; 9	BHR; 5	2nd	117
2026	AF Corse	Hypercar	Ferrari 499P	Ferrari F163CG 3.0 L Turbo V6	IMO; 10	SPA; 6	LMS; 7	SÃO; 5	COA; 13	FUJ; 12	CAT; 5	MNZ; 6	14th	49

^{‡} As Ye was a guest driver, he was ineligible for points.

=== Complete GT World Challenge results ===
==== GT World Challenge Europe Endurance Cup ====
(Races in bold indicate pole position) (Races in italics indicate fastest lap)

Year	Team	Car	Class	1	2	3	4	5	6	7	Pos.	Points
2024	AF Corse - Francorchamps Motors	Ferrari 296 GT3	Pro	LEC	SPA; 6H	SPA; 12H	SPA; 24H	NÜR	MNZ; 34	JED	NC	0
2025	AF Corse - Francorchamps Motors	Ferrari 296 GT3	Pro	LEC	MNZ	SPA; 6H	SPA; 12H	SPA; 24H	NÜR	CAT; 33	NC	0

=== Complete IMSA SportsCar Championship results ===
(key) (Races in bold indicate pole position; races in italics indicate fastest lap)

Year	Entrant	Class	Make	Engine	1	2	3	4	5	6	7	8	9	10	Rank	Points
2026	Triarsi Competizione	GTD	Ferrari 296 GT3 Evo	Ferrari F163CE 3.0 L Turbo V6	DAY; 7	SEB	LBH	LGA	WGL	MOS	ELK	VIR	IMS	PET	65th	260

Sporting positions
Preceded by Valentin Moineault	French F4 Championship; Champion; 2016	Succeeded by Arthur Rougier
Preceded by Marino Sato	Euroformula Open Championship; Champion; 2020	Succeeded by Cameron Das
Preceded by Roman Rusinov; James French; Leonard Hoogenboom	Asian Le Mans Series; LMP2 Champion; 2021; With: René Binder & Ferdinand von Habsburg	Succeeded by Ben Hanley; Matt Bell; Rodrigo Sales
Preceded by Phil Hanson; Filipe Albuquerque	European Le Mans Series; LMP2 Champion; 2021; With: Robert Kubica & Louis Delétraz	Succeeded by Louis Delétraz; Ferdinand Habsburg
Preceded by Antonio Fuoco; Miguel Molina; Nicklas Nielsen	Winner of the 24 Hours of Le Mans; 2025; With: Phil Hanson & Robert Kubica	Succeeded by Incumbent
