= 2017 V de V Challenge Monoplace =

The 2017 V de V Challenge Monoplace was a multi-event motor racing championship for open wheel, formula racing cars held across Europe. The championship features drivers competing mainly in 2 litre Formula Renault single seat race cars that conform to the technical regulations for the championship. The season began at Circuit de Barcelona-Catalunya on 17 March and will finish on 5 November at Estoril after seven triple-header rounds.

Drivers compete in two classes depending on the type of car they drive. Those competing in the current Tatuus FR 2.0 2013 car, as well as the previous Barazi-Epsilon FR2.0–10 car, which are in use since 2010, are included in Class A. Old Formula Renault 2.0 machinery along with other cars such as Formula BMW and Formula Abarth encompass Class B.

== Teams and drivers ==
Entry list
Team	No.	Driver	Class		Rounds
(Italy) TS Corse	1	(Italy) Diego Bertonelli	A		2–3, 5–7
(Italy) TS Corse	27	(United States) Howard Sklar	A	GD	All
(Italy) TS Corse	73	(Italy) Pietro Peccenini	A	GD	All
(France) Formula Motorsport	2	(France) Erwin Creed	A		All
(France) Formula Motorsport	3	(France) "Lebreton"	A	GD	All
(France) Formula Motorsport	4	(France) Michel Piroird	A	GD	3–4
(France) Formula Motorsport	5	(France) Xavier Benecchi	A	GD	3–4
(France) Formula Motorsport	6	(France) Erik Attias	A	GD	1
(France) Formula Motorsport	9	(France) Vincent Iogna	A	GD	3–4
(France) Formula Motorsport	10	(France) Nicolas Melin	A		1, 3–4, 7
(France) Formula Motorsport	17	(France) Nicolas Pironneau	A	GD	5, 7
(France) Formula Motorsport	37	(France) Gilles Heriau	A		All
(France) Formula Motorsport	45	(France) Sébastien Perrot	A		4
(Poland) Inter Europol Competition	5	(Germany) Richard Wagner	A		7
(Poland) Inter Europol Competition	20	(United States) Robert Siska	A	GD	7
(Poland) Inter Europol Competition	33	(United States) Robert Siska	A	GD	2
(France) Lamo Racing Car	7	(Switzerland) Caryl Fritsche	B	GD	4
(France) Lamo Racing Car	15	(France) Thierry Aimard	A	GD	All
(France) Lamo Racing Car	31	(France) Alexis Carmes	A		All
(France) Lamo Racing Car	41	(France) François Destandau	B	GD	5, 7
(France) Lamo Racing Car	53	(France) Grégory Choukroun	A	GD	1–3, 5–7
(France) Lamo Racing Car	68	(France) Alain Bucher	A	GD	2, 4–6
(France) Lamo Racing Car	88	(France) Eric Meriel	A	GD	3, 6
(Luxembourg) RC Formula	8	(Belgium) Simon Mirguet	A		1
(Luxembourg) RC Formula	8	(France) Amaury Richard	A		2
(Luxembourg) RC Formula	74	(France) Karl Pedraza	A	GD	1, 3–4
(Luxembourg) RC Formula	74	(France) Pierre-Alexandre Jean	A		5–6
(Luxembourg) RC Formula	74	(France) Jordan Perroy	A		7
(Luxembourg) RC Formula	82	(France) Pierre-Alexandre Jean	A		7
(France) R-ace GP	13	(France) Théo Coicaud	A		2–3
(France) R-ace GP	16	(Belgium) Gilles Magnus	A		3
(France) R-ace GP	23	(United States) Logan Sargeant	A		3
(France) R-ace GP	51	(Morocco) Michael Benyahia	A		2–3
(France) Zig Zag	14	(Monaco) Christian Carlesi Sorasio	A	GD	1
(France) Zig Zag	54	(Madagascar) Jean-Christophe Peyre	A	GD	1–2, 7
(France) Zig Zag	66	(Monaco) Nicolas Matile	A	GD	1–2, 7
(France) Hervé David Racing	18	(France) Pierre Lemasson	B	GD	4
(France) Hervé David Racing	75	(France) Hugo Carini	A		3–4, 6
(Switzerland) Heuri Rennwagen	32	(Switzerland) Moritz Müller-Crepon	A		All
(Switzerland) Heuri Rennwagen	46	(Switzerland) Walter Rykart	A	GD	All
(France) Lycée Pro D'Artagnan	34	(France) Daniel Harout	A	GD	1
(France) Monster Racing	39	(France) Arnaud Choquet	A		1, 3–4, 6
(France) Monster Racing	44	(France) "Mathieu Mopar"	B		1, 3–4, 6
(Germany) Dutt Motorsport	77	(Germany) Laurents Hörr	A		All
(France) LSP Racing Team	87	(France) Baptiste Leonard	B		3–4, 6

Icon	Class
A	Class A
B	Class B
GD	Gentleman Driver

== Race calendar and results ==
Round		Circuit	Date	Pole position	Fastest lap	Winning driver	Winning team	Gentleman winner
1	R1	(Spain) Circuit de Barcelona-Catalunya, Montmeló	18 March	(Germany) Laurents Hörr	(Germany) Laurents Hörr	(Germany) Laurents Hörr	(Germany) Dutt Motorsport	(Italy) Pietro Peccenini
1	R2	(Spain) Circuit de Barcelona-Catalunya, Montmeló	18 March	(Germany) Laurents Hörr	(Germany) Laurents Hörr	(Germany) Laurents Hörr	(Germany) Dutt Motorsport	(Italy) Pietro Peccenini
1	R3	(Spain) Circuit de Barcelona-Catalunya, Montmeló	19 March	(Germany) Laurents Hörr	(Germany) Laurents Hörr	(Germany) Laurents Hörr	(Germany) Dutt Motorsport	(France) "Lebreton"
2	R1	(Portugal) Algarve International Circuit, Portimão	29 April	(Morocco) Michael Benyahia	(Morocco) Michael Benyahia	(Morocco) Michael Benyahia	(France) R-ace GP	(Italy) Pietro Peccenini
2	R2	(Portugal) Algarve International Circuit, Portimão	29 April	(Morocco) Michael Benyahia	(Morocco) Michael Benyahia	(Morocco) Michael Benyahia	(France) R-ace GP	(France) "Lebreton"
2	R3	(Portugal) Algarve International Circuit, Portimão	30 April	(Morocco) Michael Benyahia	(Morocco) Michael Benyahia	(France) Gilles Heriau	(France) Formula Motorsport	(France) "Lebreton"
3	R1	(France) Circuit Paul Ricard, Le Castellet	27 May	(United States) Logan Sargeant	(Belgium) Gilles Magnus	(Belgium) Gilles Magnus	(France) R-ace GP	(Italy) Pietro Peccenini
3	R2	(France) Circuit Paul Ricard, Le Castellet	28 May	(Belgium) Gilles Magnus	(Belgium) Gilles Magnus	(Belgium) Gilles Magnus	(France) R-ace GP	(Italy) Pietro Peccenini
3	R3	(France) Circuit Paul Ricard, Le Castellet	28 May	(Belgium) Gilles Magnus	(Belgium) Gilles Magnus	(United States) Logan Sargeant	(France) R-ace GP	(France) Xavier Benecchi
4	R1	(France) Dijon-Prenois, Prenois	24 June	(France) Gilles Heriau	(France) Gilles Heriau	(France) Gilles Heriau	(France) Formula Motorsport	(France) Xavier Benecchi
4	R2	(France) Dijon-Prenois, Prenois	24 June	(Switzerland) Moritz Müller-Crepon	(Switzerland) Moritz Müller-Crepon	(Switzerland) Moritz Müller-Crepon	(Switzerland) Heuri Rennwagen	(France) Xavier Benecchi
4	R3	(France) Dijon-Prenois, Prenois	24 June	(France) Gilles Heriau	(France) Gilles Heriau	(France) Gilles Heriau	(France) Formula Motorsport	(France) Xavier Benecchi
5	R1	(Spain) Circuito del Jarama, Madrid	2 September	(Switzerland) Moritz Müller-Crepon	(Germany) Laurents Hörr	(Switzerland) Moritz Müller-Crepon	(Switzerland) Heuri Rennwagen	(Italy) Pietro Peccenini
5	R2	(Spain) Circuito del Jarama, Madrid	2 September	(Italy) Diego Bertonelli	(Switzerland) Moritz Müller-Crepon	(Switzerland) Moritz Müller-Crepon	(Switzerland) Heuri Rennwagen	(France) Nicolas Pironneau
5	R3	(Spain) Circuito del Jarama, Madrid	3 September	(Switzerland) Moritz Müller-Crepon	(Switzerland) Moritz Müller-Crepon	(Switzerland) Moritz Müller-Crepon	(Switzerland) Heuri Rennwagen	(Italy) Pietro Peccenini
6	R1	(France) Circuit de Nevers Magny-Cours, Magny-Cours	7 October	(Germany) Laurents Hörr	(Germany) Laurents Hörr	(Germany) Laurents Hörr	(Germany) Dutt Motorsport	(France) "Lebreton"
6	R2	(France) Circuit de Nevers Magny-Cours, Magny-Cours	7 October	(Germany) Laurents Hörr	(Germany) Laurents Hörr	(Switzerland) Moritz Müller-Crepon	(Switzerland) Heuri Rennwagen	(France) "Lebreton"
6	R3	(France) Circuit de Nevers Magny-Cours, Magny-Cours	8 October	(Switzerland) Moritz Müller-Crepon	(Italy) Diego Bertonelli	(Switzerland) Moritz Müller-Crepon	(Switzerland) Heuri Rennwagen	(France) "Lebreton"
7	R1	(Portugal) Autódromo Fernanda Pires da Silva, Estoril	4 November	(France) Pierre-Alexandre Jean	(France) Pierre-Alexandre Jean	(France) Pierre-Alexandre Jean	(Luxembourg) RC Formula	(France) "Lebreton"
7	R2	(Portugal) Autódromo Fernanda Pires da Silva, Estoril	4 November	(France) Pierre-Alexandre Jean	(Germany) Laurents Hörr	(France) Pierre-Alexandre Jean	(Luxembourg) RC Formula	(France) "Lebreton"
7	R3	(Portugal) Autódromo Fernanda Pires da Silva, Estoril	5 November	(France) Pierre-Alexandre Jean	(France) Pierre-Alexandre Jean	(France) Pierre-Alexandre Jean	(Luxembourg) RC Formula	(Italy) Pietro Peccenini

== Standings ==
=== Points system ===
Points are awarded following a complex system. Drivers receive a set of points according to their overall position in each race, as well as an additional set of points according to their position within the class their car belongs to. No separated standings for classes A and B are issued. The points distribution is as follows:

Position		**1st**	**2nd**	**3rd**	**4th**	**5th**	**6th**	**7th**	**8th**	**9th**	**10th**	**11th**	**12th**	**13th**	**14th**	**15th**	**16th**	**17th**	**18th**	**19th**	**20th**	**21st**	**22nd**	**23rd+**
Points	Overall	25	23	21	20	19	18	17	16	15	14	13	12	11	10	9	8	7	6	5	4	3	2	1
Points	Per class (≥4 starters)	10	9	8	7	6	5	4	3	2	1													
Points	Per class (<4 starters)	3	2	1																				

The total number of points scored in each round is multiplied by a coefficient, depending on the round. Only the best 19 results are counted towards the overall standings, whereas all results are valid towards the Gentlemen Drivers standings.

Round	Coefficient
(France) Rounds 3–4, 6	**x1**
(Spain) Rounds 1, 5	**x1.5**
(Portugal) Rounds 2, 7	**x2**

=== Drivers' standings ===
Pos	Driver	CAT (Spain)			POR (Portugal)			LEC (France)			DIJ (France)			JAR (Spain)			MAG (France)			EST (Portugal)			Points		
Pos	Driver	CAT (Spain)			POR (Portugal)			LEC (France)			DIJ (France)			JAR (Spain)			MAG (France)			EST (Portugal)			Total	Drop	Final
1	(France) Gilles Heriau	2	3	2	2	4	1	3	Ret	5	**1**	2	**1**	3	3	3	4	3	3	12	6	7	811	24	787
2	(Germany) Laurents Hörr	**1**	**1**	**1**	5	5	3	5	Ret	6	Ret	5	3	6	9	DSQ	**1**	**14**	5	2	2	3	733.5		733.5
3	(Switzerland) Moritz Müller-Crepon	3	2	3	6	Ret	19	6	Ret	Ret	2	**1**	2	**1**	1	**1**	3	1	**1**	3	13	4	703.5		703.5
4	(Italy) Diego Bertonelli				3	3	2	9	3	4				2	**2**	2	5	2	2	4	3	2	662		662
5	(France) Alexis Carmes	19	8	8	7	9	6	13	8	12	7	4	11	7	5	5	7	5	7	8	7	6	589	18.5	571.5
6	(France) Erwin Creed	5	5	5	10	7	5	10	13	9	11	12	17	4	DSQ	13	6	4	DNS	6	4	8	554.5	7	547.5
7	(France) "Lebreton"	7	9	7	9	8	8	16	15	15	4	6	5	9	8	7	8	6	8	10	8	21	520	14	506
8	(Italy) Pietro Peccenini	6	6	9	8	10	9	12	9	13	6	7	10	8	7	6	9	7	9	13	16	10	513	23	490
9	(France) Pierre-Alexandre Jean													5	4	4	2	9	4	**1**	**1**	**1**	404.5		404.5
10	(France) Nicolas Melin	4	4	4				8	6	8	10	8	6							7	11	9	341.5		341.5
11	(France) Grégory Choukroun	11	11	12	14	11	11	17	16	18				11	10	8	12	10	11	14	12	13	326.5		326.5
12	(Morocco) Michaël Benyahia				**1**	**1**	**7**	7	5	3													257		257
13	(France) Thierry Aimard	13	15	Ret	18	12	16	18	17	23	15	15	DNS	12	11	9	14	12	12	18	17	14	257		257
14	(France) Théo Coicaud				4	2	10	4	4	2													234		234
15	(Switzerland) Walter Rykart	20	16	18	13	13	15	19	18	22	14	14	13	16	DNS	14	16	18	Ret	11	20	16	224		224
16	(United States) Howard Sklar	17	18	17	17	15	18	21	23	24	19	19	18	15	14	12	18	16	14	19	15	19	203.5	2	201.5
17	(France) Arnaud Choquet	8	7	10				Ret	14	16	9	11	7				10	8	10				200.5		200.5
18	(Monaco) Nicolas Matile	12	13	13	11	17	12													17	18	15	159		159
19	(Madagascar) Jean-Christophe Peyre	15	14	14	15	14	14													16	14	17	151.5		151.5
20	(France) Jordan Perroy																			5	5	5	150		150
21	(France) Nicolas Pironneau													10	6	11				Ret	10	11	134		134
22	(France) Xavier Benecchi							14	10	10	3	3	4										125		125
23	(France) Alain Bucher				16	16	17				17	16	14	13	12	Ret	15	17	Ret				121.5		121.5
24	(France) Mathieu Mopar **(B)**	18	19	19				22	22	25	20	20	19				19	15	16				117.5		117.5
25	(France) Amaury Richard				19	6	4																110		110
26	(France) Baptiste Leonard **(B)**							Ret	21	20	16	17	16				13	11	13				110		110
27	(France) Hugo Carini							11	7	11	8	Ret	DNS				11	Ret	6				102		102
28	(United States) Logan Sargeant							**2**	2	1													99		99
29	(France) François Destandau **(B)**													14	13	10				20	Ret	18	98		98
30	(United States) Robert Siska				12	18	13													15	19	20	94		94
31	(France) Vincent Iogna							15	11	14	5	9	8										93		93
32	(Germany) Richard Wagner																			9	9	12	92		92
33	(Belgium) Gilles Magnus							1	**1**	**7**													91		91
34	(Belgium) Simon Mirguet	9	10	6																			82.5		82.5
35	(France) Karl Pedraza	10	Ret	16				Ret	19	19	18	18	15										65.5		65.5
36	(France) Michel Piroird							DNS	12	17	12	10	9										63		63
37	(France) Daniel Harout	14	12	11																			52.5		52.5
38	(France) Eric Meriel							20	20	21							17	13	15				38		38
39	(Monaco) Christian Carlesi Sorasio	16	17	15																			36		36
40	(France) Sébastien Perrot										13	13	12										34		34
41	(France) Erik Attias	Ret	DNS	DNS																			0		0
42	(Switzerland) Caryl Fritsche **(B)**										Ret	DNS	WD										0		0
43	(France) Pierre Lemasson **(B)**										DNS	DNS	WD										0		0
Pos	Driver	CAT (Spain)			POR (Portugal)			LEC (France)			DIJ (France)			JAR (Spain)			MAG (France)			EST (Portugal)			Total	Drop	Final
Pos	Driver	CAT (Spain)			POR (Portugal)			LEC (France)			DIJ (France)			JAR (Spain)			MAG (France)			EST (Portugal)			Points		

Colour	Result
Gold	Winner
Silver	Second place
Bronze	Third place
Green	Points classification
Blue	Non-points classification
Blue	Non-classified finish (NC)
Purple	Retired, not classified (Ret)
Red	Did not qualify (DNQ)
Red	Did not pre-qualify (DNPQ)
Black	Disqualified (DSQ)
White	Did not start (DNS)
White	Withdrew (WD)
White	Race cancelled (C)
Blank	Did not practice (DNP)
Blank	Did not arrive (DNA)
Blank	Excluded (EX)

**Bold** – Pole
Italics – Fastest Lap
