= 2017 Formula Renault Northern European Cup =

Motor racing competition

The 2017 Formula Renault Northern European Cup is the twelfth Formula Renault Northern European Cup season, an open-wheel motor racing series for emerging young racing drivers based in Europe.

== Drivers and teams ==
- For the Spa event, some drivers used different numbers in line with Eurocup Formula Renault 2.0 regulations; each driver's Spa race number is displayed in tooltips.

Team	No.	Driver name	Rounds
(France) R-ace GP	1	(France) Charles Milesi	All
(France) R-ace GP	2	(France) Théo Coicaud	All
(France) R-ace GP	3	(Morocco) Michaël Benyahia	All
(France) R-ace GP	4	(Belgium) Gilles Magnus	All
(France) R-ace GP	8	(United Kingdom) Will Palmer	4
(France) R-ace GP	9	(Belgium) Max Defourny	4
(France) R-ace GP	10	(Russia) Robert Shwartzman	4
(France) R-ace GP	12	(Mexico) Raúl Guzmán	4
(France) R-ace GP	43	(United States) Logan Sargeant	5
(France) Tech 1 Racing	5	(Australia) Thomas Maxwell	1, 3–4
(France) Tech 1 Racing	6	(France) Thomas Neubauer	1, 3–5
(France) Tech 1 Racing	7	(United Kingdom) Max Fewtrell	1, 4
(France) Tech 1 Racing	14	(France) Gabriel Aubry	1, 3–5
(Germany) Josef Kaufmann Racing	11	(France) Sacha Fenestraz	3–5
(Germany) Josef Kaufmann Racing	41	(China) Yifei Ye	3–5
(Germany) Josef Kaufmann Racing	42	(Australia) Luis Leeds	3–4
(Germany) Josef Kaufmann Racing	42	(United Kingdom) James Pull	5
(Spain) AVF by Adrián Vallés	13	(Portugal) Henrique Chaves	4
(Spain) AVF by Adrián Vallés	14	(Spain) Xavier Lloveras	4
(Spain) AVF by Adrián Vallés	15	(Mexico) Axel Matus	4
(Spain) AVF by Adrián Vallés	16	(Australia) Thomas Randle	4
(United Kingdom) Arden Motorsport	15	(United Kingdom) James Pull	3
(United Kingdom) Arden Motorsport	33	(United Kingdom) Dan Ticktum	3–4
(United Kingdom) Arden Motorsport	34	(Belgium) Ghislain Cordeel	4
(United Kingdom) Arden Motorsport	34	(Russia) Aleksandr Vartanyan	5
(United Kingdom) Arden Motorsport	81	(Australia) Oscar Piastri	5
(United Kingdom) Arden Motorsport	93	(Australia) Zane Goddard	4
(United Kingdom) Fortec Motorsport	17	(Australia) Alex Peroni	4
(United Kingdom) Fortec Motorsport	18	(Russia) Aleksey Korneev	4
(United Kingdom) Fortec Motorsport	19	(United Kingdom) Frank Bird	1, 4
(United Kingdom) Fortec Motorsport	20	(Malaysia) Najiy Razak	4
(United Kingdom) Fortec Motorsport	51	(Malaysia) Chia Wing Hoong	1
(Italy) JD Motorsport	21	(China) Sun Yueyang	1, 3–4
(Italy) JD Motorsport	22	(France) Jean-Baptiste Simmenauer	1, 3–4
(Italy) JD Motorsport	23	(Russia) Aleksandr Vartanyan	4
(United Kingdom) Burdett Motorsport	25	(Poland) Julia Pankiewicz	1, 4
(United Kingdom) Burdett Motorsport	26	(Indonesia) Presley Martono	1, 4
(Netherlands) MP Motorsport	29	(Netherlands) Richard Verschoor	2, 4–5
(Netherlands) MP Motorsport	30	(Netherlands) Jarno Opmeer	2, 4–5
(Netherlands) MP Motorsport	31	(United States) Neil Verhagen	2, 4
(Germany) Anders Motorsport	48	(Germany) Andreas Estner	5
(Poland) BM Racing Team	96	(Poland) Bartłomiej Mirecki	All

== Calendar ==
The provisional calendar for the 2017 season was announced on 2 December 2016. On 28 December 2016 was confirmed that Circuit Paul Ricard will host the seventh venue for the season.

A revision of the calendar reduced the number of rounds to five and amended the clashes between the series and the Eurocup series. At Spa NEC drivers joined Eurocup drivers on the grid, but the Eurocup drivers were ineligible to score points, and despite that on track races 1 & 3 were won by Sacha Fenestraz and race 2 by Gabriel Aubry they didn't receive NEC trophies.

Round		Circuit	Date	Pole position	Fastest lap	Winning driver	Winning team	Supporting
1	R1	(Italy) Autodromo Nazionale Monza	24 June	(France) Gabriel Aubry	(France) Gabriel Aubry	(France) Gabriel Aubry	(France) Tech 1 Racing	Clio Cup Italia
1	R2	(Italy) Autodromo Nazionale Monza	25 June	(France) Gabriel Aubry	(United Kingdom) Max Fewtrell	(France) Gabriel Aubry	(France) Tech 1 Racing	Clio Cup Italia
2	R1	(Netherlands) TT Circuit Assen	5 August	(Belgium) Gilles Magnus	(Belgium) Gilles Magnus	(United States) Neil Verhagen	(Netherlands) MP Motorsport	Gamma Racing Days
2	R2	(Netherlands) TT Circuit Assen	6 August	(Belgium) Gilles Magnus	(Belgium) Gilles Magnus	(Netherlands) Richard Verschoor	(Netherlands) MP Motorsport	Gamma Racing Days
3	R1	(Germany) Nürburgring, Nürburg	16 September	(France) Sacha Fenestraz	(France) Sacha Fenestraz	(France) Sacha Fenestraz	(Germany) Josef Kaufmann Racing	Blancpain GT Series Sprint Cup
3	R2	(Germany) Nürburgring, Nürburg	17 September	(France) Sacha Fenestraz	(France) Sacha Fenestraz	(France) Sacha Fenestraz	(Germany) Josef Kaufmann Racing	Blancpain GT Series Sprint Cup
4	R1	(Belgium) Circuit de Spa-Francorchamps, Spa	23 September	(France) Sacha Fenestraz	(Morocco) Michaël Benyahia	(Belgium) Gilles Magnus (Note: Sacha Fenestraz won the race, but he wasn't eligible to claim winning trophy at Spa because he wasn't a Northern European Cup regular.)	(France) R-ace GP	European Le Mans Series; Eurocup Formula Renault 2.0
4	R2	(Belgium) Circuit de Spa-Francorchamps, Spa	23 September	(France) Sacha Fenestraz	(Belgium) Max Defourny	(France) Charles Milesi (Note: Gabriel Aubry won the race, but he wasn't eligible to claim winning trophy at Spa because he wasn't a Northern European Cup regular.)	(France) R-ace GP	European Le Mans Series; Eurocup Formula Renault 2.0
4	R3	(Belgium) Circuit de Spa-Francorchamps, Spa	24 September	(France) Sacha Fenestraz	(France) Sacha Fenestraz	(Belgium) Gilles Magnus	(France) R-ace GP	European Le Mans Series; Eurocup Formula Renault 2.0
5	R1	(Germany) Hockenheimring, Hockenheim	7 October	(China) Yifei Ye	(China) Yifei Ye	(China) Yifei Ye	(Germany) Josef Kaufmann Racing	Deutsche Tourenwagen Classics
5	R2	(Germany) Hockenheimring, Hockenheim	7 October	(China) Yifei Ye	(China) Yifei Ye	(China) Yifei Ye	(Germany) Josef Kaufmann Racing	Deutsche Tourenwagen Classics

== Championship standings ==
Points system

Points were awarded to the top 20 classified finishers.

Position	**1st**	**2nd**	**3rd**	**4th**	**5th**	**6th**	**7th**	**8th**	**9th**	**10th**	**11th**	**12th**	**13th**	**14th**	**15th**	**16th**	**17th**	**18th**	**19th**	**20th**
Points	30	24	20	17	16	15	14	13	12	11	10	9	8	7	6	5	4	3	2	1

=== Drivers' championship ===
Pos.	Driver	MNZ (Italy)		ASS (Netherlands)		NÜR (Germany)		SPA (Belgium)			HOC (Germany)		Points
Pos.	Driver	1	2	3	4	5	6	7	8	9	10	11	Points
1	(Morocco) Michaël Benyahia	Ret	3	5	6	7	5	27	24	23	9	9	163
2	(Belgium) Gilles Magnus	5	4	**7**	**2**	8	6	14	Ret	18	15	10	161
3	(Poland) Bartłomiej Mirecki	3	11	6	5	11	11	30	30	26	11	6	151
4	(France) Théo Coicaud	10	9	8	7	13	12	28	31	25	12	13	129.5
5	(France) Gabriel Aubry	**1**	**1**			5	2	6	1	4	6	Ret	115
6	(France) Sacha Fenestraz					**1**	**1**	**1**	**3**	**1**	2	2	108
7	(France) Charles Milesi	Ret	8	3	Ret	DSQ	7	23	20	Ret	13	12	106
8	(China) Yifei Ye					2	3	3	7	8	**1**	**1**	104
9	(Netherlands) Richard Verschoor			2	1			7	12	Ret	3	5	90
10	(Netherlands) Jarno Opmeer			4	3			11	10	6	7	4	68
11	(France) Thomas Neubauer	6	Ret			9	Ret	25	33	29	14	11	52
12	(United Kingdom) Max Fewtrell	2	2					5	4	9			48
13	(United Kingdom) James Pull					10	9				10	7	48
14	(United States) Neil Verhagen			1	4			8	8	5			47
15	(France) Jean-Baptiste Simmenauer	Ret	6			6	4	26	22	24			47
16	(Russia) Aleksandr Vartanyan							22	19	10	5	3	36
17	(Australia) Thomas Maxwell	Ret	5			14	8	13	13	12			36
18	(China) Sun Yueyang	4	Ret			12	14	34	26	Ret			33
19	(Australia) Luis Leeds					4	10	29	23	Ret			28
20	(United Kingdom) Frank Bird	9	7					32	27	20			26
21	(Australia) Oscar Piastri										8	8	26
22	(Poland) Julia Pankiewicz	7	10					31	29	28			25
23	(United States) Logan Sargeant										4	14	24
24	(Malaysia) Chia Wing Hoong	8	12										22
25	(Indonesia) Presley Martono	Ret	Ret					20	17	17			0
	(Germany) Andreas Estner										WD	WD	0
Guest drivers ineligible to score points
	(Belgium) Max Defourny							4	2	3			
	(United Kingdom) Will Palmer							9	6	2			
	(Russia) Robert Shwartzman							2	25	Ret			
	(United Kingdom) Dan Ticktum					3	13	18	11	7			
	(Australia) Thomas Randle							10	5	11			
	(Portugal) Henrique Chaves							12	9	14			
	(Australia) Zane Goddard							24	18	13			
	(Mexico) Axel Matus							17	14	19			
	(Australia) Alex Peroni							15	16	15			
	(Russia) Aleksey Korneev							19	15	21			
	(Mexico) Raúl Guzmán							16	32	16			
	(Spain) Xavier Lloveras							21	21	22			
	(Malaysia) Najiy Razak							33	28	27			
Pos.	Driver	MNZ (Italy)		ASS (Netherlands)		NÜR (Germany)		SPA (Belgium)			HOC (Germany)		Points

Colour	Result
Gold	Winner
Silver	Second place
Bronze	Third place
Green	Points classification
Blue	Non-points classification
Blue	Non-classified finish (NC)
Purple	Retired, not classified (Ret)
Red	Did not qualify (DNQ)
Red	Did not pre-qualify (DNPQ)
Black	Disqualified (DSQ)
White	Did not start (DNS)
White	Withdrew (WD)
White	Race cancelled (C)
Blank	Did not practice (DNP)
Blank	Did not arrive (DNA)
Blank	Excluded (EX)

**Bold** – Pole
Italics – Fastest Lap
† — Drivers did not finish the race, but were classified as they completed over 75% of the race distance.

=== Teams' championship ===
Pos	Team	Points
1	(France) R-ace GP	348
2	(Germany) Josef Kaufmann Racing	204
3	(Netherlands) MP Motorsport	174
4	(France) Tech 1 Racing	170
5	(Poland) BM Racing Team	87
6	(Italy) JD Motorsport	40
7	(United Kingdom) Arden Motorsport	80
8	(United Kingdom) Fortec Motorsports	12
9	(United Kingdom) Burdett Motorsport	7
NC	(Germany) Anders Motorsport	0
Teams ineligible for points
NC	(Spain) AVF by Adrián Vallés	0
