= 2019 GT4 European Series =

The 2019 GT4 European Series was the twelfth season of the GT4 European Series, a sports car championship created and organised by the Stéphane Ratel Organisation (SRO). The season began on 13 April at Monza and ended on 1 September at the Nürburgring.

== Calendar ==
At the annual press conference during the 2018 24 Hours of Spa on 27 July, the Stéphane Ratel Organisation announced the first draft of the 2019 calendar, in which Barcelona-Catalunya initially made an appearance. It was dropped from the schedule and replaced by Zandvoort, when the finalised calendar was announced on 22 October.

Round	Circuit	Date	Supporting
1	Autodromo Nazionale Monza, Monza, Italy	13–14 April	Blancpain GT Series Endurance Cup
2	(United Kingdom) Brands Hatch, Kent, Great Britain	4–5 May	Blancpain GT World Challenge Europe
3	Circuit Paul Ricard, Le Castellet, France	1–2 June	Blancpain GT Series Endurance Cup
4	Misano World Circuit Marco Simoncelli, Misano Adriatico, Italy	29–30 June	Blancpain GT World Challenge Europe
5	Circuit Zandvoort, Zandvoort, Netherlands	13–14 July	Blancpain GT World Challenge Europe
6	Nürburgring, Nürburg, Germany	31 August–1 September	Blancpain GT World Challenge Europe

== Partners ==
The GT4 European Series is supported by 5 sponsors. These are the tire manufacturer Pirelli, the lubricant specialist RAVENOL, the watch manufacturer CERTINA, Elf and Gullwing Racing Insurance.

== Entry list ==
Team	Car	No.	Drivers	Class	Rounds
(Belgium) Street Art Racing	Aston Martin Vantage AMR GT4	007	(France) Julien Darras	S	All
(Belgium) Street Art Racing	Aston Martin Vantage AMR GT4	007	(Belgium) Jamie Vandenbalck	S	All
(Belgium) Street Art Racing	Aston Martin Vantage AMR GT4	17	(Switzerland) Pascal Bachmann	Am	All
(Belgium) Street Art Racing	Aston Martin Vantage AMR GT4	17	(Luxembourg) Clément Seyler	Am	All
(Germany) Phoenix Racing	Audi R8 LMS GT4	1	(Switzerland) Cédric Freiburghaus	S	All
(Germany) Phoenix Racing	Audi R8 LMS GT4	1	(Denmark) Nicolaj Møller Madsen	S	All
(Germany) Leipert Motorsport	Mercedes-AMG GT4	2	(Norway) Marcus Påverud	PA	All
(Germany) Leipert Motorsport	Mercedes-AMG GT4	2	(Germany) Luca Trefz	PA	All
(Germany) Leipert Motorsport	Mercedes-AMG GT4	4	(Poland) Jan Kisiel	S	All
(Germany) Leipert Motorsport	Mercedes-AMG GT4	4	(Netherlands) Max Koebolt	S	All
(Netherlands) Ekris Motorsport	BMW M4 GT4	8	(Netherlands) Ricardo van der Ende	S	All
(Netherlands) Ekris Motorsport	BMW M4 GT4	8	(United Kingdom) Euan McKay	S	All
(France) CMR	Alpine A110 GT4	9	(France) Soheil Ayari	PA	1–3
(France) CMR	Alpine A110 GT4	9	(France) Guillaume Roman	PA	1–3
(France) CMR	Alpine A110 GT4	9	(France) Pierre-Alexandre Jean	S	4
(France) CMR	Alpine A110 GT4	9	(France) Stéphane Lémeret	S	4
(France) CMR	Alpine A110 GT4	36	(France) Pierre-Alexandre Jean	S	1–3
(France) CMR	Alpine A110 GT4	36	(France) Pierre Sancinéna	S	1–3
(France) CMR	Alpine A110 GT4	48	(France) David Loger	Am	All
(France) CMR	Alpine A110 GT4	48	(Monaco) Eric Mouez	Am	All
(Netherlands) / Las Moras by Equipe Verschuur (Note: Car No. 11 entered as Las Moras by Equipe Verschuur and car No. 14 entered as Equipe Verschuur.); (Netherlands) / Equipe Verschuur	McLaren 570S GT4	11	(Netherlands) Liesette Braams	Am	1–5
(Netherlands) / Las Moras by Equipe Verschuur; (Netherlands) / Equipe Verschuur	McLaren 570S GT4	11	(Netherlands) Luc Braams	Am	1
(Netherlands) / Las Moras by Equipe Verschuur; (Netherlands) / Equipe Verschuur	McLaren 570S GT4	11	(Netherlands) Gaby Uljee	Am	2–5
(Netherlands) / Las Moras by Equipe Verschuur; (Netherlands) / Equipe Verschuur	McLaren 570S GT4	14	(Belgium) Benjamin Lessennes	S	All
(Netherlands) / Las Moras by Equipe Verschuur; (Netherlands) / Equipe Verschuur	McLaren 570S GT4	14	(United Kingdom) Daniel McKay	S	All
(Turkey) Borusan Otomotiv Motorsport	BMW M4 GT4	12	(Turkey) Ibrahim Okyay	PA	1–5
(Turkey) Borusan Otomotiv Motorsport	BMW M4 GT4	12	(Turkey) Fatih Ayhan	PA	1
(Turkey) Borusan Otomotiv Motorsport	BMW M4 GT4	12	(Turkey) Levent Kocabıyık	PA	2, 5
(Turkey) Borusan Otomotiv Motorsport	BMW M4 GT4	12	(Turkey) Cem Bölükbaşı	PA	3–4
(Germany) Schwede Motorsport	Mercedes-AMG GT4	13	(Germany) Marc Basseng	PA	1–5
(Germany) Schwede Motorsport	Mercedes-AMG GT4	13	(Germany) Phillip Bethke	PA	1–5
(Germany) Schwede Motorsport	Mercedes-AMG GT4	777	(Germany) Jan Rehnig	PA	All
(Germany) Schwede Motorsport	Mercedes-AMG GT4	777	(Germany) Dominik Schraml	PA	All
(Spain) NM Racing Team	Ginetta G55 GT4	15	(Spain) Max Llobet	S	1–3
(Spain) NM Racing Team	Ginetta G55 GT4	15	(Spain) Lluc Ibáñez	S	1–3
(Spain) NM Racing Team	Ginetta G55 GT4	15	(Spain) Lluc Ibáñez	PA	4–6
(Spain) NM Racing Team	Ginetta G55 GT4	15	(Spain) Jorge Cabezas Catalan	PA	4–6
(Austria) / True Racing (Note: Car No. 16 entered as True Racing and car No. 24 entered as Valvoline - True Racing.); (Austria) / Valvoline - True Racing	KTM X-Bow GT4	16	(Austria) Reinhard Kofler	S	All
(Austria) / True Racing; (Austria) / Valvoline - True Racing	KTM X-Bow GT4	16	(Switzerland) Patric Niederhauser	S	All
(Austria) / True Racing; (Austria) / Valvoline - True Racing	KTM X-Bow GT4	24	(Norway) Mads Siljehaug	S	All
(Austria) / True Racing; (Austria) / Valvoline - True Racing	KTM X-Bow GT4	24	(Germany) Phil Hill	S	1–4
(Austria) / True Racing; (Austria) / Valvoline - True Racing	KTM X-Bow GT4	24	(United States) Nicolai Elghanayan	S	5
(Austria) / True Racing; (Austria) / Valvoline - True Racing	KTM X-Bow GT4	24	(Austria) Eike Angermayer	S	6
(Germany) PROsport Performance	Aston Martin Vantage AMR GT4	18	(India) Akhil Rabindra	S	1–3, 6
(Germany) PROsport Performance	Aston Martin Vantage AMR GT4	18	(Switzerland) Florian Thoma	S	1–3
(Germany) PROsport Performance	Aston Martin Vantage AMR GT4	18	(Austria) David Griessner	S	6
(Germany) PROsport Performance	Aston Martin Vantage AMR GT4	19	(Austria) David Griessner	S	1–4
(Germany) PROsport Performance	Aston Martin Vantage AMR GT4	19	(France) Jérémy Sarhy	S	1–3
(Germany) PROsport Performance	Aston Martin Vantage AMR GT4	19	(India) Akhil Rabindra	S	4
(Germany) PROsport Performance	Aston Martin Vantage AMR GT4	19	(Germany) Alex Mies	S	6
(Germany) PROsport Performance	Aston Martin Vantage AMR GT4	19	(Germany) Mike David Ortmann	S	6
(Germany) Allied-Racing	Porsche 718 Cayman GT4 Clubsport	21	(Germany) Benjamin Mazatis	PA	All
(Germany) Allied-Racing	Porsche 718 Cayman GT4 Clubsport	21	(Switzerland) Niki Leutwiler	PA	1–3
(Germany) Allied-Racing	Porsche 718 Cayman GT4 Clubsport	21	(Austria) Constantin Schöll	PA	4–6
(Germany) Allied-Racing	Porsche 718 Cayman GT4 Clubsport	22	(Germany) Jan Kasperlik	PA	1, 3–6
(Germany) Allied-Racing	Porsche 718 Cayman GT4 Clubsport	22	(Austria) Nicolas Schöll	PA	1, 3–6
(Germany) Allied-Racing	Porsche 718 Cayman GT4 Clubsport	22	(Belgium) Glenn Van Parijs	S	2
(Germany) Allied-Racing	Porsche 718 Cayman GT4 Clubsport	22	(Austria) Constantin Schöll	S	2
(Netherlands) MDM Motorsport	BMW M4 GT4	25	(Netherlands) Simon Knap	S	All
(Netherlands) MDM Motorsport	BMW M4 GT4	25	(United States) Alec Udell	S	All
(Netherlands) MDM Motorsport	BMW M4 GT4	26	(Netherlands) Mark van der Aa	S	All
(Netherlands) MDM Motorsport	BMW M4 GT4	26	(Netherlands) Koen Bogaerts	S	All
(France) IMSA Performance	Audi R8 LMS GT4	27	(France) Michael Blanchemain	Am	3
(France) IMSA Performance	Audi R8 LMS GT4	27	(France) Franck Leherpeur	Am	3
(Belgium) Selleslagh Racing Team	Mercedes-AMG GT4	30	(Belgium) Guillaume Dumarey	S	1–3
(Belgium) Selleslagh Racing Team	Mercedes-AMG GT4	30	(Belgium) Jean Glorieux	S	1–3
(Belgium) Selleslagh Racing Team	Mercedes-AMG GT4	30	(Belgium) Jean Glorieux	PA	4
(Belgium) Selleslagh Racing Team	Mercedes-AMG GT4	30	(Belgium) Guillaume Dumarey	PA	4
(Belgium) Selleslagh Racing Team	Mercedes-AMG GT4	30	(Netherlands) Kay van Berlo	PA	5
(Belgium) Selleslagh Racing Team	Mercedes-AMG GT4	30	(Belgium) Angélique Detavernier	PA	5
(Belgium) Selleslagh Racing Team	Mercedes-AMG GT4	30	(Belgium) Angélique Detavernier	Am	6
(Belgium) Selleslagh Racing Team	Mercedes-AMG GT4	30	(Belgium) David Dermont	Am	6
(Belgium) Selleslagh Racing Team	Mercedes-AMG GT4	31	(Netherlands) Bas Schouten	S	1–2
(Belgium) Selleslagh Racing Team	Mercedes-AMG GT4	31	(Netherlands) Junior Strous	S	1
(Belgium) Selleslagh Racing Team	Mercedes-AMG GT4	31	(Netherlands) Meindert van Buuren	S	2
(Belgium) Selleslagh Racing Team	Mercedes-AMG GT4	31	(Belgium) Stéphane Lémeret	S	3
(Belgium) Selleslagh Racing Team	Mercedes-AMG GT4	31	(France) Aurélien Panis	S	3
(Belgium) Selleslagh Racing Team	Mercedes-AMG GT4	31	(Venezuela) Jonathan Cecotto	PA	4
(Belgium) Selleslagh Racing Team	Mercedes-AMG GT4	31	(Italy) Alessandro Giovanelli	PA	4
(Belgium) Selleslagh Racing Team	Mercedes-AMG GT4	31	(Italy) Alessandro Giovanelli	Am	5–6
(Belgium) Selleslagh Racing Team	Mercedes-AMG GT4	31	(Netherlands) Bob Herber	Am	5–6
(Belgium) Selleslagh Racing Team	Mercedes-AMG GT4	32	(Belgium) Jean-Luc Behets	Am	1, 3–4, 6
(Belgium) Selleslagh Racing Team	Mercedes-AMG GT4	32	(Belgium) Johan Vannerum	Am	1, 3–4, 6
(Spain) Bullitt Racing	Mercedes-AMG GT4	33	(United Kingdom) Andy Meyrick	PA	All
(Spain) Bullitt Racing	Mercedes-AMG GT4	33	(United Kingdom) Stephen Pattrick	PA	All
(Spain) Bullitt Racing	Mercedes-AMG GT4	66	(Russia) Oleg Kharuk	PA	2–3
(Spain) Bullitt Racing	Mercedes-AMG GT4	66	(Russia) Ivan Lukashevich	PA	2–3
(Spain) Bullitt Racing	Mercedes-AMG GT4	66	(Germany) Alex Lambertz	S	4–6
(Spain) Bullitt Racing	Mercedes-AMG GT4	66	(France) Romain Monti	S	4–6
(France) Rédélé Compétition	Alpine A110 GT4	35	(France) Grégoire Demoustier	PA	1–5
(France) Rédélé Compétition	Alpine A110 GT4	35	(France) Alain Ferté	PA	1–5
(France) Rédélé Compétition	Alpine A110 GT4	76	(France) Laurent Coubard	Am	4
(France) Rédélé Compétition	Alpine A110 GT4	76	(France) Jean Charles Rédélé	Am	4
(United Kingdom) Generation AMR SuperRacing	Aston Martin Vantage GT4	44	(United Kingdom) Matthew George	PA	1–2
(United Kingdom) Generation AMR SuperRacing	Aston Martin Vantage GT4	44	(United Kingdom) James Holder	PA	1–2
(United Kingdom) Generation AMR SuperRacing	Aston Martin Vantage AMR GT4	44	(United Kingdom) James Holder	PA	3
(United Kingdom) Generation AMR SuperRacing	Aston Martin Vantage AMR GT4	44	(United Kingdom) Matthew George	PA	3
(Germany) Team GT	McLaren 570S GT4	55	(Morocco) Michaël Benyahia	S	1, 3
(Germany) Team GT	McLaren 570S GT4	55	(United Kingdom) Charlie Fagg	S	1, 3
(Germany) Team GT	McLaren 570S GT4	56	(Germany) Christian Danner	Am	3
(Germany) Team GT	McLaren 570S GT4	56	(Germany) Bernhard Laber	Am	3
(United Kingdom) Academy Motorsport	Aston Martin Vantage AMR GT4	61	(United Kingdom) Fiona James	PA	1–3, 5
(United Kingdom) Academy Motorsport	Aston Martin Vantage AMR GT4	61	(United Kingdom) Tom Wood	PA	1–3, 5
(United Kingdom) Academy Motorsport	Aston Martin Vantage AMR GT4	61	(United Kingdom) Tom Wood	S	4, 6
(United Kingdom) Academy Motorsport	Aston Martin Vantage AMR GT4	61	(Monaco) Micah Stanley	S	4, 6
(United Kingdom) Academy Motorsport	Aston Martin Vantage AMR GT4	62	(United Kingdom) Matt Cowley	S	All
(United Kingdom) Academy Motorsport	Aston Martin Vantage AMR GT4	62	(United Kingdom) Will Moore	S	1–5
(United Kingdom) Academy Motorsport	Aston Martin Vantage AMR GT4	62	(United Kingdom) Finlay Hutchison	S	6
(Netherlands) V8 Racing	Chevrolet Camaro GT4.R	68	(Netherlands) Oliver Hart	S	5
(Netherlands) V8 Racing	Chevrolet Camaro GT4.R	68	(United Kingdom) Finlay Hutchison	S	5
(Netherlands) V8 Racing	Chevrolet Camaro GT4.R	69	(Netherlands) Duncan Huisman	S	1, 3–4
(Netherlands) V8 Racing	Chevrolet Camaro GT4.R	69	(Netherlands) Olivier Hart	S	1
(Netherlands) V8 Racing	Chevrolet Camaro GT4.R	69	(Netherlands) Francesco Pastorelli	S	3–4
(Netherlands) V8 Racing	Chevrolet Camaro GT4.R	69	(Netherlands) Duncan Huisman	PA	5
(Netherlands) V8 Racing	Chevrolet Camaro GT4.R	69	(Netherlands) Luc Braams	PA	5
(San Marino) W & D Racing Team	BMW M4 GT4	71	(San Marino) Paolo Meloni	PA	All
(San Marino) W & D Racing Team	BMW M4 GT4	71	(Italy) Massimiliano Tresoldi	PA	All
(Poland) eSky WP Racing	Maserati GranTurismo MC GT4	77	(Poland) Łukasz Kręski	Am	3
(Poland) eSky WP Racing	Maserati GranTurismo MC GT4	77	(Poland) Maciej Marcinkiewicz	Am	3
(France) Team Speedcar	Alpine A110 GT4	88	(France) Robert Consani	S	3
(France) Team Speedcar	Alpine A110 GT4	88	(France) Benjamin Lariche	S	3
(Austria) razoon - more than racing	KTM X-Bow GT4	99	(Austria) Dominik Olbert	PA	1–2
(Austria) razoon - more than racing	KTM X-Bow GT4	99	(Austria) Constantin Schöll	PA	1
(Austria) razoon - more than racing	KTM X-Bow GT4	99	(Austria) Laura Kraihamer	PA	2
(Austria) razoon - more than racing	KTM X-Bow GT4	99	(Turkey) Önder Erdem	Am	3–4, 6
(Austria) razoon - more than racing	KTM X-Bow GT4	99	(Austria) Dominik Olbert	Am	3–4, 6
(Germany) RN Vision STS	BMW M4 GT4	111	(Italy) Gabriele Piana	PA	All
(Germany) RN Vision STS	BMW M4 GT4	111	(Germany) Marius Zug	PA	All
(Switzerland) Centri Porsche Ticino	Porsche 718 Cayman GT4 Clubsport	718	(Switzerland) Max Busnelli	Am	3
(Switzerland) Centri Porsche Ticino	Porsche 718 Cayman GT4 Clubsport	718	(Switzerland) Ivan Jacoma	Am	3
(Switzerland) Centri Porsche Ticino	Porsche 718 Cayman GT4 Clubsport	718	(Switzerland) Ivan Jacoma	PA	6
(Switzerland) Centri Porsche Ticino	Porsche 718 Cayman GT4 Clubsport	718	(Italy) Kevin Gilardoni	PA	6

Icon	Class
S	Silver Cup
PA	Pro-Am Cup
Am	Am Cup

== Race results ==
Bold indicates overall winner.

Round		Circuit	Pole position	Silver Winners	Pro-Am Winners	Am Winners
1	R1	(Italy) Monza	(Germany) No. 55 Team GT	**(Netherlands) No. 14 Equipe Verschuur**	(Germany) No. 111 RN Vision STS	(Belgium) No. 32 Selleslagh Racing Team
1	R1	(Italy) Monza	(Morocco) Michaël Benyahia (United Kingdom) Charlie Fagg	**(Belgium) Benjamin Lessennes** **(United Kingdom) Daniel McKay**	(Italy) Gabriele Piana (Germany) Marius Zug	(Belgium) Jean-Luc Behets (Belgium) Johan Vannerum
1	R2	(Italy) Monza	(Netherlands) No. 69 V8 Racing	**(Netherlands) No. 14 Equipe Verschuur**	(Germany) No. 2 Leipert Motorsport	(Belgium) No. 32 Selleslagh Racing Team
1	R2	(Italy) Monza	(Netherlands) Olivier Hart (Netherlands) Duncan Huisman	**(Belgium) Benjamin Lessennes** **(United Kingdom) Daniel McKay**	(Norway) Marcus Påverud (Germany) Luca Trefz	(Belgium) Jean-Luc Behets (Belgium) Johan Vannerum
2	R1	(United Kingdom) Brands Hatch	(Germany) No. 18 PROsport Performance	**(Austria) No. 16 True Racing**	(Germany) No. 2 Leipert Motorsport	(France) No. 48 CMR
2	R1	(United Kingdom) Brands Hatch	(India) Akhil Rabindra (Switzerland) Florian Thoma	**(Austria) Reinhard Kofler** **(Switzerland) Patric Niederhauser**	(Norway) Marcus Påverud (Germany) Luca Trefz	(France) David Loger (Monaco) Eric Mouez
2	R2	(United Kingdom) Brands Hatch	(Netherlands) No. 14 Equipe Verschuur	**(Germany) No. 4 Leipert Motorsport**	(France) No. 35 Rédélé Compétition	(Belgium) No. 17 Street Art Racing
2	R2	(United Kingdom) Brands Hatch	(Belgium) Benjamin Lessennes (United Kingdom) Daniel McKay	**(Poland) Jan Kisiel** **(Netherlands) Max Koebolt**	(France) Grégoire Demoustier (France) Alain Ferté	(Switzerland) Pascal Bachmann (Luxembourg) Clément Seyler
3	R1	(France) Paul Ricard	(United Kingdom) No. 44 Generation AMR SuperRacing	**(Netherlands) No. 25 MDM Motorsport**	(France) No. 35 Rédélé Compétition	(Germany) No. 56 Team GT
3	R1	(France) Paul Ricard	(United Kingdom) Matthew George (United Kingdom) James Holder	**(Netherlands) Simon Knap** **(United States) Alec Udell**	(France) Grégoire Demoustier (France) Alain Ferté	(Germany) Christian Danner (Germany) Bernhard Laber
3	R2	(France) Paul Ricard	(Netherlands) No. 25 MDM Motorsport	**(Netherlands) No. 25 MDM Motorsport**	(San Marino) No. 71 W & D Racing Team	(France) No. 48 CMR
3	R2	(France) Paul Ricard	(Netherlands) Simon Knap (United States) Alec Udell	**(Netherlands) Simon Knap** **(United States) Alec Udell**	(San Marino) Paolo Meloni (Italy) Massimiliano Tresoldi	(France) David Loger (Monaco) Eric Mouez
4	R1	(Italy) Misano	(Austria) No. 24 Valvoline - True Racing	**(Spain) No. 66 Bullitt Racing**	(Germany) No. 111 RN Vision STS	(Belgium) No. 32 Selleslagh Racing Team
4	R1	(Italy) Misano	(Germany) Phil Hill (Norway) Mads Siljehaug	**(Germany) Alex Lambertz** **(France) Romain Monti**	(Italy) Gabriele Piana (Germany) Marius Zug	(Belgium) Jean-Luc Behets (Belgium) Johan Vannerum
4	R2	(Italy) Misano	(Germany) No. 4 Leipert Motorsport	**(Germany) No. 4 Leipert Motorsport**	(Germany) No. 777 Schwede Motorsport	(Belgium) No. 17 Street Art Racing
4	R2	(Italy) Misano	(Poland) Jan Kisiel (Netherlands) Max Koebolt	**(Poland) Jan Kisiel** **(Netherlands) Max Koebolt**	(Germany) Jan Rehnig (Germany) Dominik Schraml	(Switzerland) Pascal Bachmann (Luxembourg) Clément Seyler
5	R1	(Netherlands) Zandvoort	(Austria) No. 24 Valvoline - True Racing	**(Germany) No. 1 Phoenix Racing**	(Germany) No. 111 RN Vision STS	(Belgium) No. 31 Selleslagh Racing Team
5	R1	(Netherlands) Zandvoort	(United States) Nicolai Elghanayan (Norway) Mads Siljehaug	**(Switzerland) Cédric Freiburghaus** **(Denmark) Nicolaj Møller Madsen**	(Italy) Gabriele Piana (Germany) Marius Zug	(Italy) Alessandro Giovanelli (Netherlands) Bob Herber
5	R2	(Netherlands) Zandvoort	(Netherlands) No. 14 Equipe Verschuur	**(Netherlands) No. 25 MDM Motorsport**	(Germany) No. 2 Leipert Motorsport	(France) No. 48 CMR
5	R2	(Netherlands) Zandvoort	(Belgium) Benjamin Lessennes (United Kingdom) Daniel McKay	**(Netherlands) Simon Knap** **(United States) Alec Udell**	(Norway) Marcus Påverud (Germany) Luca Trefz	(France) David Loger (Monaco) Eric Mouez
6	R1	(Germany) Nürburgring	(Netherlands) No. 8 Ekris Motorsport	**(Spain) No. 66 Bullitt Racing**	(Germany) No. 111 RN Vision STS	(Belgium) No. 32 Selleslagh Racing Team
6	R1	(Germany) Nürburgring	(Netherlands) Ricardo van der Ende (United Kingdom) Euan McKay	**(Germany) Alex Lambertz** **(France) Romain Monti**	(Italy) Gabriele Piana (Germany) Marius Zug	(Belgium) Jean-Luc Behets (Belgium) Johan Vannerum
6	R2	(Germany) Nürburgring	(Netherlands) No. 8 Ekris Motorsport	**(Netherlands) No. 8 Ekris Motorsport**	(Germany) No. 111 RN Vision STS	(Belgium) No. 32 Selleslagh Racing Team
6	R2	(Germany) Nürburgring	(Netherlands) Ricardo van der Ende (United Kingdom) Euan McKay	**(Netherlands) Ricardo van der Ende** **(United Kingdom) Euan McKay**	(Italy) Gabriele Piana (Germany) Marius Zug	(Belgium) Jean-Luc Behets (Belgium) Johan Vannerum

== Championship standings ==
Scoring system

Championship points were awarded for the first ten positions in each race. Entries were required to complete 75% of the winning car's race distance in order to be classified and earn points. Individual drivers were required to participate for a minimum of 25 minutes in order to earn championship points in any race.

Position	**1st**	**2nd**	**3rd**	**4th**	**5th**	**6th**	**7th**	**8th**	**9th**	**10th**
Points	25	18	15	12	10	8	6	4	2	1

=== Drivers' championship ===
Pos.	Driver	Team	MNZ (Italy)		BRH (United Kingdom)		LEC (France)		MIS (Italy)		ZAN (Netherlands)		NÜR (Germany)		Points
Silver Cup
1	(Netherlands) Simon Knap (United States) Alec Udell	(Netherlands) MDM Motorsport	3	Ret	6	11	1	**1**	3	5	6	1	5	6	156
2	(Poland) Jan Kisiel (Netherlands) Max Koebolt	(Germany) Leipert Motorsport	5	7	4	1	8	3	4	**1**	5	4	9	7	156
3	(Belgium) Benjamin Lessennes (United Kingdom) Daniel McKay	(Netherlands) Equipe Verschuur	1	1	3	**6**	Ret	2	27	11	4	**3**	7	3	143
4	(Netherlands) Ricardo van der Ende (United Kingdom) Euan McKay	(Netherlands) Ekris Motorsport	DNS	10	10	5	**2**	6	6	2	10	2	**2**	**1**	141
5	(Austria) Reinhard Kofler (Switzerland) Patric Niederhauser	(Austria) True Racing	Ret	4	1	3	5	4	8	17	Ret	6	3	2	121
6	(Switzerland) Cédric Freiburghaus (Denmark) Nicolaj Møller Madsen	(Germany) Phoenix Racing	4	3	Ret	2	Ret	Ret	5	10	1	5	4	30	108
7	(Germany) Alex Lambertz (France) Romain Monti	(Spain) Bullitt Racing							1	3	11	Ret	1	18	68
8	(India) Akhil Rabindra	(Germany) PROsport Performance	13	11	**2**	9	14	5	Ret	13			10	10	57
9	(Switzerland) Florian Thoma	(Germany) PROsport Performance	13	11	**2**	9	14	5							46
10	(Netherlands) Mark van der Aa (Netherlands) Koen Bogaerts	(Netherlands) MDM Motorsport	8	20	Ret	7	3	10	13	19	9	Ret	16	14	46
11	(France) Julien Darras (Belgium) Jamie Vandenbalck	(Belgium) Street Art Racing	Ret	DNS	9	4	4	14	16	8	18	14	17	16	42
12	(Norway) Mads Siljehaug	(Austria) Valvoline - True Racing	Ret	Ret	23	18	31	Ret	**15**	Ret	**3**	Ret	11	5	30
13	(Netherlands) Olivier Hart	(Netherlands) V8 Racing	20	**13**							2	7			26
14	(Austria) David Griessner	(Germany) PROsport Performance	Ret	25	5	17	Ret	12	Ret	13			10	10	23
15	(Netherlands) Duncan Huisman	(Netherlands) V8 Racing	20	**13**			30	23	7	4					22
16	(Morocco) Michaël Benyahia (United Kingdom) Charlie Fagg	(Germany) Team GT	**2**	Ret			16	21							20
17	(Netherlands) Francesco Pastorelli	(Netherlands) V8 Racing					30	23	7	4					20
18	(Netherlands) Bas Schouten	(Belgium) Selleslagh Racing Team	27	2	19	28									18
18	(Netherlands) Junior Strous	(Belgium) Selleslagh Racing Team	27	2											18
19	(Spain) Lluc Ibáñez (Spain) Max Llobet	(Spain) NM Racing Team	16	12	20	12	17	7							13
20	(France) Jérémy Sarhy	(Germany) PROsport Performance	Ret	25	5	17	Ret	12							12
21	(Belgium) Stéphane Lémeret	(Belgium) Selleslagh Racing Team					9	13							11
21	(Belgium) Stéphane Lémeret	(France) CMR							10	28					11
22	(France) Pierre-Alexandre Jean	(France) CMR	11	19	Ret	DNS	Ret	Ret	10	28					10
23	(Monaco) Micah Stanley (United Kingdom) Tom Wood	(United Kingdom) Academy Motorsport							Ret	7			Ret	23	8
24	(France) Aurélien Panis	(Belgium) Selleslagh Racing Team					9	13							7
25	(France) Pierre Sancinéna	(France) CMR	11	19	Ret	DNS	Ret	Ret							6
26	(United Kingdom) Matt Cowley	(United Kingdom) Academy Motorsport	15	18	18	25	Ret	32			12	18	Ret	19	3
26	(United Kingdom) Will Moore	(United Kingdom) Academy Motorsport	15	18	18	25	Ret	32			12	18			3
27	(Belgium) Glenn Van Parijs (Austria) Constantin Schöll	(Germany) Allied-Racing			14	19									2
28	(Belgium) Guillaume Dumarey (Belgium) Jean Glorieux	(Belgium) Selleslagh Racing Team	17	16	22	13	20	Ret							1
29	(Germany) Phil Hill	(Austria) Valvoline - True Racing	Ret	Ret	23	18	31	Ret	**15**	Ret					1
	(Netherlands) Meindert van Buuren	(Belgium) Selleslagh Racing Team			19	28									0
	(France) Robert Consani (France) Benjamin Lariche	(France) Team Speedcar					DNS	Ret							
Drivers ineligible to score points
	(United Kingdom) Finlay Hutchison	(Netherlands) V8 Racing									2	7			
	(United Kingdom) Finlay Hutchison	(United Kingdom) Academy Motorsport											Ret	19	
	(United States) Nicolai Elghanayan	(Austria) Valvoline - True Racing									**3**	Ret			
	(Germany) Alex Mies (Germany) Mike David Ortmann	(Germany) PROsport Performance											8	4	
	(Austria) Eike Angermayer	(Austria) Valvoline - True Racing											11	5	
Pro-Am Cup
1	(Norway) Marcus Påverud (Germany) Luca Trefz	(Germany) Leipert Motorsport	10	5	**7**	10	13	9	18	9	13	8	12	11	207
2	(Italy) Gabriele Piana (Germany) Marius Zug	(Germany) RN Vision STS	6	6	8	Ret	10	17	**2**	DNS	7	11	**6**	**8**	199
3	(Germany) Jan Rehnig (Germany) Dominik Schraml	(Germany) Schwede Motorsport	22	8	17	20	12	Ret	19	**6**	16	Ret	13	13	103
4	(Germany) Jan Kasperlik (Austria) Nicolas Schöll	(Germany) Allied-Racing	**7**	**9**			32	11	26	12	14	Ret	28	9	95
5	(France) Grégoire Demoustier (France) Alain Ferté	(France) Rédélé Compétition	14	17	16	8	6	33	20	22	Ret	12			94
6	(San Marino) Paolo Meloni (Italy) Massimiliano Tresoldi	(San Marino) W & D Racing Team	9	23	13	Ret	11	**8**	Ret	Ret			20	22	76
7	(Germany) Marc Basseng (Germany) Phillip Bethke	(Germany) Schwede Motorsport	Ret	Ret	27	**24**	12	15	11	16	16	13			69
8	(Germany) Benjamin Mazatis	(Germany) Allied-Racing	18	15	Ret	15	23	26	Ret	24	19	Ret	18	12	59
9	(Turkey) Ibrahim Okyay	(Turkey) Borusan Otomotiv Motorsport	12	24	24	22	Ret	24	9	20	23	Ret			51
10	(United Kingdom) Fiona James (United Kingdom) Tom Wood	(United Kingdom) Academy Motorsport	25	21	11	14	29	16			Ret	Ret			47
11	(Switzerland) Ivan Jacoma	(Switzerland) Centri Porsche Ticino					7	31					15	17	20
12	(Switzerland) Niki Leutwiler	(Germany) Allied-Racing	18	15	Ret	15	23	26							31
13	(Spain) Jorge Cabezas Catalan (Spain) Lluc Ibáñez	(Spain) NM Racing Team							Ret	Ret	**8**	**Ret**	19	27	30
14	(Netherlands) Duncan Huisman (Netherlands) Luc Braams	(Netherlands) V8 Racing									15	10			28
15	(Austria) Constantin Schöll	(Austria) razoon - more than racing	Ret	DSQ											28
15	(Austria) Constantin Schöll	(Germany) Allied-Racing							Ret	24	19	Ret	18	12	28
16	(United Kingdom) Andy Meyrick (United Kingdom) Stephen Pattrick	(Spain) Bullitt Racing	28	Ret	12	26	Ret	20	24	Ret			Ret	Ret	27
17	(Turkey) Cem Bölükbaşı	(Turkey) Borusan Otomotiv Motorsport					Ret	24	9	20					26
18	(Venezuela) Jonathan Cecotto (Italy) Alessandro Giovanelli	(Belgium) Selleslagh Racing Team							12	15					22
19	(Switzerland) Max Busnelli	(Switzerland) Centri Porsche Ticino					7	31							18
20	(Belgium) Guillaume Dumarey (Belgium) Jean Glorieux	(Belgium) Selleslagh Racing Team							25	14					14
21	(Turkey) Levent Kocabıyık	(Turkey) Borusan Otomotiv Motorsport			24	22					23	Ret			14
22	(Turkey) Fatih Ayhan	(Turkey) Borusan Otomotiv Motorsport	12	24											11
23	(France) Soheil Ayari (France) Guillaume Roman	(France) CMR	Ret	14	Ret	Ret	Ret	Ret							10
24	(United Kingdom) Matthew George (Note: Matthew George and James Holder were ineligible to score points at Monza and Brands Hatch, because they entered an older generation Aston Martin Vantage GT4, which was no longer homologated.) (United Kingdom) James Holder	(United Kingdom) Generation AMR SuperRacing	23	DNS	15	16	**15**	22							10
	(Russia) Oleg Kharuk (Russia) Ivan Lukashevich	(Spain) Bullitt Racing			Ret	DNS	Ret	Ret							
	(Austria) Dominik Olbert	(Austria) razoon - more than racing	Ret	DSQ	DNS	DNS									
	(Austria) Laura Kraihamer	(Austria) razoon - more than racing			DNS	DNS									
Drivers ineligible to score points
	(Netherlands) Kay van Berlo (Belgium) Angelique Detavernier	(Belgium) Selleslagh Racing Team									DSQ	9			
	(Italy) Kevin Gilardoni	(Switzerland) Centri Porsche Ticino											15	17	
Am Cup
1	(Switzerland) Pascal Bachmann (Luxembourg) Clément Seyler	(Belgium) Street Art Racing	24	26	25	21	19	**29**	17	18	24	19	22	**29**	202
2	(France) David Loger (Monaco) Eric Mouez	(France) CMR	**26**	Ret	21	**27**	**25**	18	23	23	**22**	15	23	28	183
3	(Belgium) Jean-Luc Behets (Belgium) Johan Vannerum	(Belgium) Selleslagh Racing Team	19	**22**			24	27	**14**	21			21	20	165
4	(Netherlands) Liesette Braams	(Netherlands) Las Moras by Equipe Verschuur	21	27	**26**	23	27	28	21	26	25	17			134
5	(Netherlands) Gaby Uljee	(Netherlands) Las Moras by Equipe Verschuur			**26**	23	27	28	21	26	25	17			101
6	(Italy) Alessandro Giovanelli	(Belgium) Selleslagh Racing Team									21	**16**	27	21	71
7	(Germany) Christian Danner (Germany) Bernhard Laber	(Germany) Team GT					18	19							43
8	(Netherlands) Luc Braams	(Netherlands) Las Moras by Equipe Verschuur	21	27											33
9	(Turkey) Önder Erdem (Austria) Dominik Olbert	(Austria) razoon - more than racing					28	Ret	28	**27**			**25**	Ret	32
10	(Poland) Łukasz Kręski (Poland) Maciej Marcinkiewicz	(Poland) eSky WP Racing					22	25							27
11	(France) Laurent Coubard (France) Jean Charles Rédélé	(France) Rédélé Competition							22	25					24
12	(France) Michael Blanchemain (France) Franck Leherpeur	(France) IMSA Performance					21	30							21
Drivers ineligible to score points
	(Netherlands) Bob Herber	(Belgium) Selleslagh Racing Team									21	**16**	27	21	
	(Belgium) David Dermont (Belgium) Angélique Detavernier	(Belgium) Selleslagh Racing Team											Ret	24	
Pos.	Driver	Team	MNZ (Italy)		BRH (United Kingdom)		LEC (France)		MIS (Italy)		ZAN (Netherlands)		NÜR (Germany)		Points

Key
Colour	Result
Gold	Race winner
Silver	2nd place
Bronze	3rd place
Green	Points finish
Blue	Non-points finish
Blue	Non-classified finish (NC)
Purple	Did not finish (Ret)
Black	Disqualified (DSQ)
Black	Excluded (EX)
White	Did not start (DNS)
White	Race cancelled (C)
White	Withdrew (WD)
Blank	Did not participate

**Bold** – Pole
Italics – Fastest Lap

=== Teams' championship ===
Only the highest finishing car per team scored points and all other cars entered by that team were invisible as far as scoring points concerned. Only the highest ranked car in its respective category counted towards the championship. Parentheses indicate results that did not count towards the championship. Only two cars can be considered as forming the same team for the Teams' championship. If more than two cars are entered under the same competitor license, the competitor has to nominate the car numbers eligible to score points. Failure to do so will default the eligibility to score points to the two cars with the lowest car numbers. In several occasions full points were not awarded, because it is dependent on the number of teams participating per class.

Pos.	Team	Manufacturer	Points
1	(Germany) Leipert Motorsport	Mercedes-AMG	230
2	(Germany) RN Vision STS	BMW	196
3	(Belgium) Street Art Racing	Aston Martin	189
4	(Netherlands) (Las Moras by) Equipe Verschuur	McLaren	185
5	(Netherlands) MDM Motorsport	BMW	170
6	(Netherlands) Ekris Motorsport	BMW	155
7	(Austria) (Valvoline -) True Racing	KTM	148
8	(Germany) Schwede Motorsport	Mercedes-AMG	146
9	(Germany) Allied-Racing	Porsche	142
10	(Belgium) Selleslagh Racing Team	Mercedes-AMG	132
11	(Germany) Phoenix Racing	Audi	116
12	(France) Rédélé Compétition	Alpine	114
13	(Spain) Bullitt Racing	Mercedes-AMG	109
14	(France) CMR	Alpine	107
15	(United Kingdom) Academy Motorsport	Aston Martin	85
16	(Germany) PROsport Performance	Aston Martin	82
17	(San Marino) W & D Racing Team	BMW	80
18	(Germany) Team GT	McLaren	68
19	(Netherlands) V8 Racing	Chevrolet	66
20	(Turkey) Borusan Otomotiv Motorsport	BMW	66
21	(Spain) NM Racing Team	Ginetta	64
22	(Switzerland) Centri Porsche Ticino	Porsche	41
23	(Austria) razoon - more than racing	KTM	40
24	(Poland) eSky WP Racing	Maserati	30
25	(France) IMSA Performance	Audi	27
26	(United Kingdom) Generation AMR SuperRacing (Note: Generation AMR SuperRacing were ineligible to score points at Monza and Brands Hatch, because they entered an older generation Aston Martin Vantage GT4, which was no longer homologated.)	Aston Martin	12
	(France) Team SpeedCar	Alpine	
Pos.	Team	Manufacturer	Points

== See also ==
- 2019 ADAC GT4 Germany season
- 2019 French GT4 Cup
- 2019 GT4 South European Series
