= Michaël Benyahia =

Moroccan racing driver

Michael Benyahia
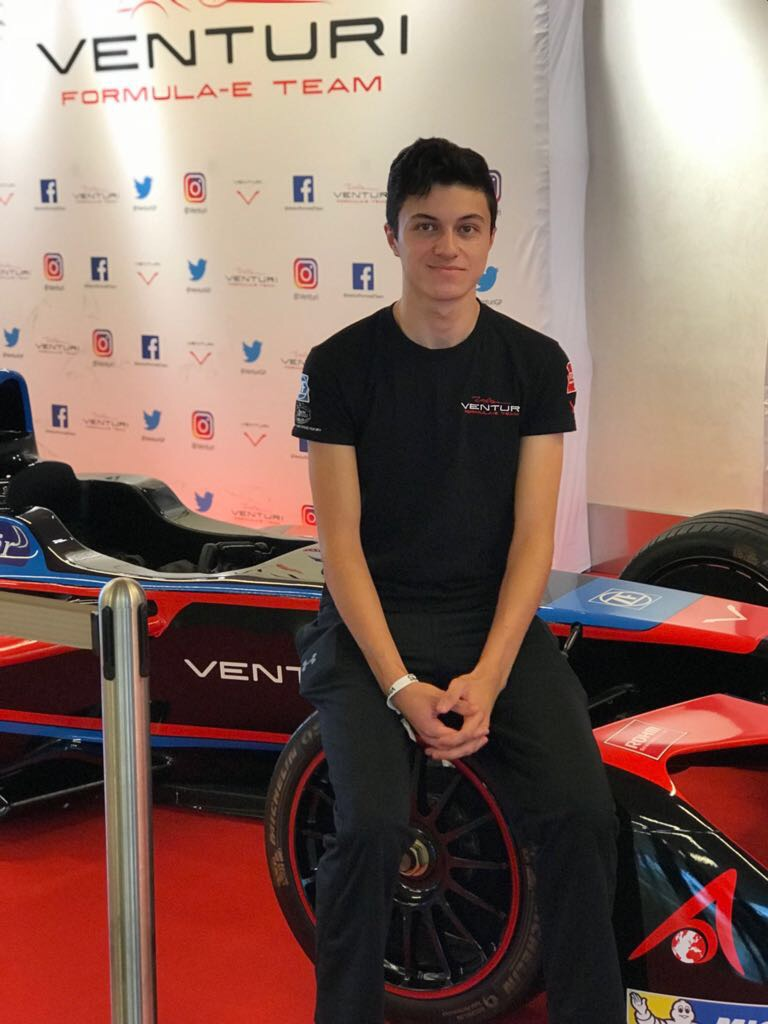
- Benyahia at a Venturi presentation in Monaco in 2017
- Nationality: (Morocco) Moroccan (United States) American via dual nationality
- Born: July 21, 2000 (age 26) Miami, United States

FIA Motorsport Games career
- Debut season: 2022
- Current team: Optimum Motorsport
- Categorisation: FIA Silver
- Car number: 10

Previous series
- 2017 2016–15: Formula Renault 2.0 NEC; French F4 Championship

Championship titles
- 2017: Formula Renault 2.0 NEC

Awards
- 2017 2017: SISL Trophée Espoir; Mars d'Or 2M Challenge

Michaël Benyahia (born July 21, 2000, in Miami) is a Moroccan racing driver.

== Career ==
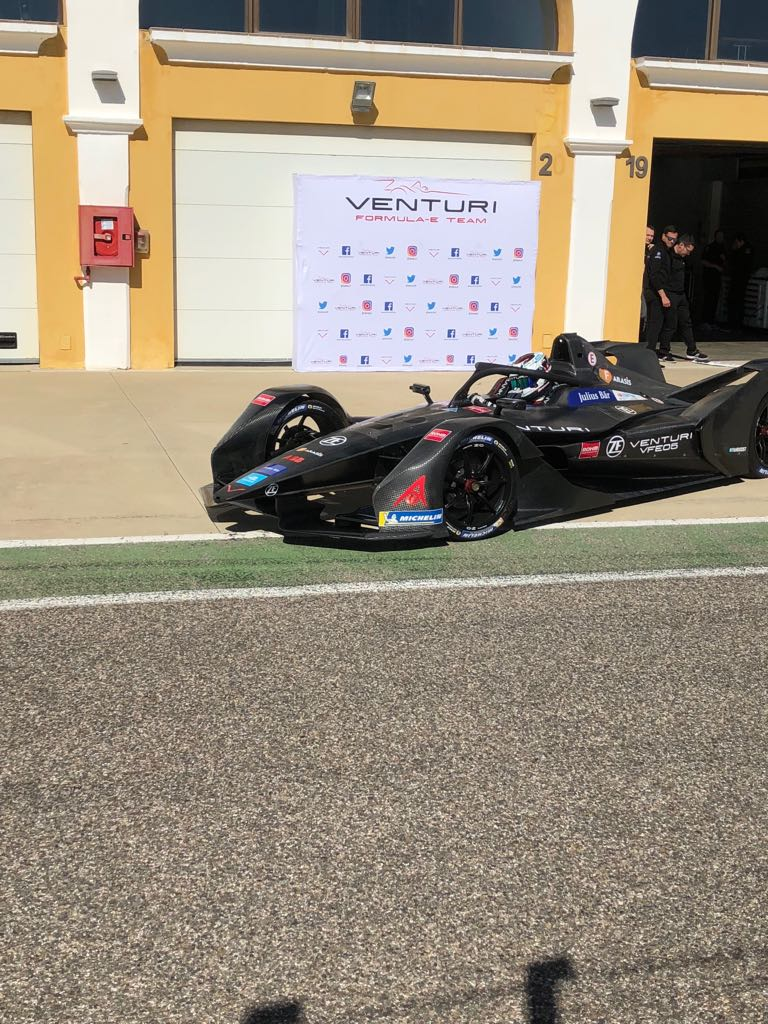
Benyahia testing a GEN2 car, March 2018.

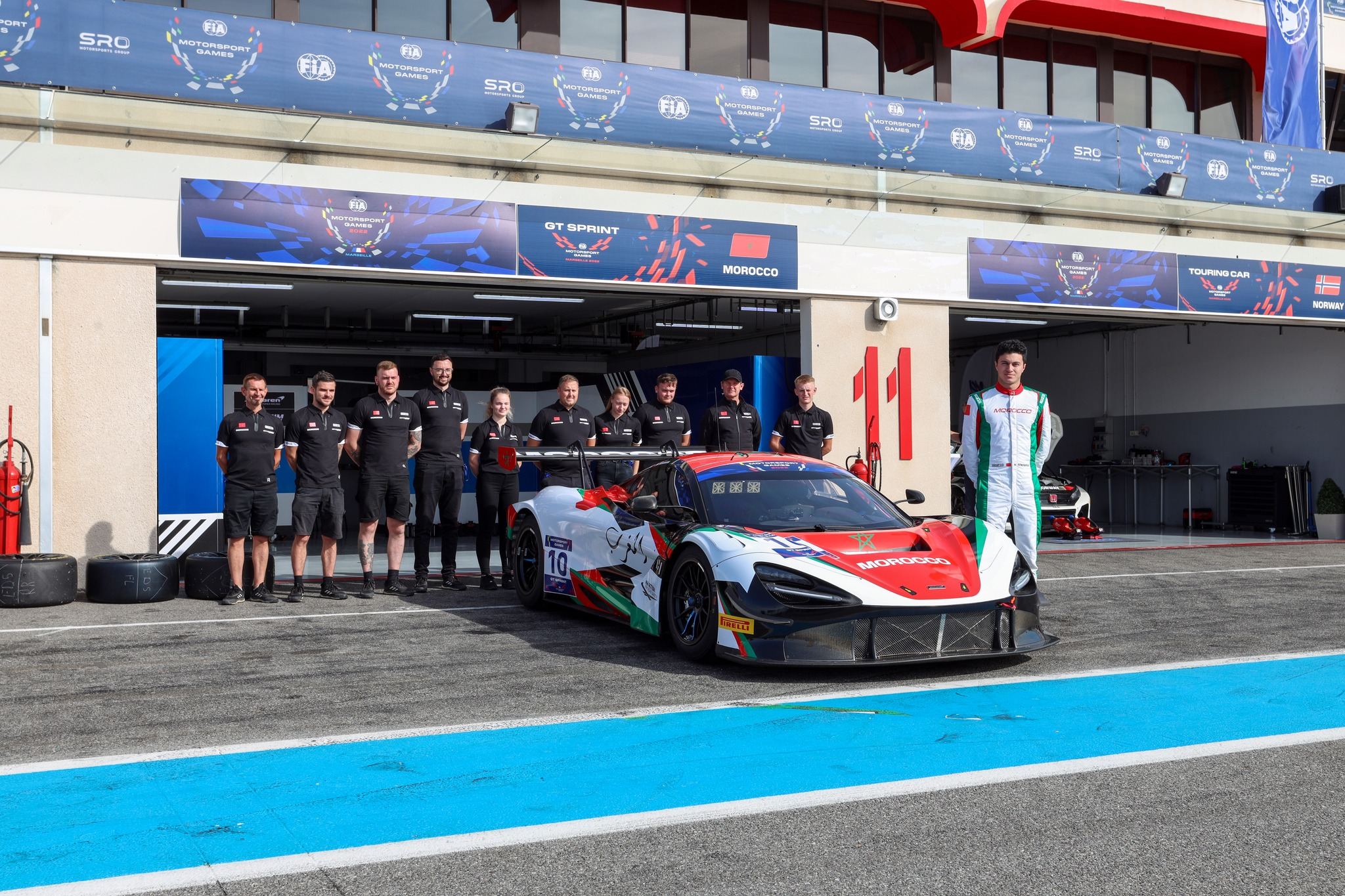
Benyahia representing Morocco at the FIA Motorsport Games, October 2022.

=== Early career ===
Benyahia was born in Miami of a Moroccan father and a Belgian mother. His father, Karim Benyahia, is a businessman in hands-free technologies. His mother, Pascale Van Cleemput, was Honorary consul of Belgium in Miami between 2002 and 2005.

Benyahia began karting in 2007 at the age of seven, claiming numerous titles in his career.

In November 2013, Benyahia took part in the Rotax Max Challenge Grand Finals held in New Orleans, where he finished sixth of the Mini Max category.

=== Lower formulae ===
In 2015, Benyahia graduated to single-seaters in the French F4 Championship, where he earned nine points and finished 17th. The following year he repeated this series, finishing 3rd and claiming a victory and six podiums.

=== Formula Renault ===
Benyahia signed with the R-ace GP Team and became 2017 Formula Renault FR 2.0 NEC Champion. As part of his prize for becoming the 2017 champion at Hockenheim, Benyahia paid a visit to Renault Sport's F1 facility at Enstone.

=== Formula 3 ===
Between June and October 2019, Benyahia joined the development program of the British team Carlin Motorsport to prepare for a series in F3.

=== Formula E ===
In September 2017, Benyahia joined Venturi Formula E Team as Development Driver, one month later he took part in the pre-season test session in Valencia, then in January 2018 at the Rookie Test of the Marrakesh ePrix where he was the youngest among the twenty participants, in which he finished 19th in the first session and 18th in the second.

=== British GT ===
Benyahia was one of four confirmed McLaren DDP drivers that would drive two McLaren 570S GT4s for Tolman Motorsport for the 2020 season, after he, Katie Milner, Harry Hayek and Alain Valente were the top-four drivers in an 18-driver selection at Snetterton.

=== FIA Motorsport Games ===
Benyahia would represent Morocco in the FIA Motorsport Games that would be hosted from October 26 to 30 at Circuit Paul Ricard in the GT Sprint discipline.

== Racing record ==
=== Career summary ===
Season	Series	Team	Races	Wins	Poles	F. Laps	Podiums	Points	Position
2015	French F4 Championship	Auto Sport Academy	18	0	0	0	0	12	17th
2016	French F4 Championship	FFSA Academy	23	1	0	0	6	218	**3rd**
2017	V de V Challenge Monoplace	R-ace GP	6	2	3	3	3	257	12th
2017	Formula Renault 2.0 NEC	R-ace GP	11	0	0	1	1	163	**1st**
2017	Eurocup Formula Renault 2.0	R-ace GP	3	0	0	1	0	0	NC†
2017–18	Formula E	Venturi Formula E Team	Test driver						
2018	Euroformula Open Championship	RP Motorsport	6	0	0	0	0	9	19th
2018	Spanish Formula 3 Championship	RP Motorsport	2	0	0	0	0	4	16th
2019	GT4 European Series	Team GT	4	0	0	0	1	20	16th
2019	ADAC GT4 Germany	Team GT	12	1	0	0	2	105	6th
2021	British GT Championship - GT4	Jenson Team Rocket RJN	9	0	1	0	2	67	8th
2022	International GT Open	Optimum Motorsport	2	0	0	0	0	0	NC†
2022	FIA Motorsport Games GT Sprint	Team Morocco	1	0	0	0	0	N/A	13th

^{†} As Benyahia was a guest driver, he was ineligible for points.

=== Complete French F4 Championship results ===
(key) (Races in bold indicate pole position) (Races in italics indicate fastest lap)

Year	1	2	3	4	5	6	7	8	9	10	11	12	13	14	15	16	17	18	19	20	21	22	23	Pos	Points
2015	LÉD; 1; 17	LÉD; 2; 13	LÉD; 3; 17	LMS; 1; 14	LMS; 2; 17	LMS; 3; 10	PAU; 1; 13	PAU; 2; 8	PAU; 3; 10	HUN; 1; 16	HUN; 2; 13	HUN; 3; 16	MAG; 1; 10	MAG; 2; 12	MAG; 3; 9	NAV; 1	NAV; 2	NAV; 3	LEC; 1; 15	LEC; 2; 14	LEC; 3; 15			17th	12
2016	LEC; 1; 3	LEC; 2; 3	LEC; 3; 11	LEC; 4; 15	PAU; 1; 2	PAU; 2 Ret	PAU; 3 Ret	PAU; 4; 12	LÉD; 1; 5	LÉD; 2; 2	LÉD; 3; 5	LÉD; 4; 4	MAG; 1; 4	MAG; 2; 11	MAG; 3; 4	MAG; 4; 4	LMS; 1; 7	LMS; 2; 3	LMS; 3; 6	LMS; 4; 5	CAT; 1; 8	CAT; 2; 1	CAT; 3; 5	3rd	218

=== Complete V de V Challenge Monoplace results ===
(key) (Races in bold indicate pole position) (Races in italics indicate fastest lap)

Year	Team	1	2	3	4	5	6	7	8	9	10	11	12	13	14	15	16	17	18	19	20	21	Pos	Points
2017	R-ace GP	CAT; 1	CAT; 2	CAT; 3	**POR**; **1**; 1	**POR**; **2**; 1	**POR**; **3**; 7	LEC; 1; 7	LEC; 2; 5	LEC; 3; 3	DIJ; 1	DIJ; 2	DIJ; 3	JAR; 1	JAR; 2	JAR; 3	MAG; 1	MAG; 2	MAG; 3	EST; 1	EST; 2	EST; 3	12th	257

=== Complete Formula Renault NEC results ===
(key) (Races in bold indicate pole position) (Races in italics indicate fastest lap)

Year	Entrant	1	2	3	4	5	6	7	8	9	10	11	DC	Points
2017	R-ace GP	MNZ; 1 Ret	MNZ; 2; 3	ASS; 1; 5	ASS; 2; 6	NÜR; 1; 7	NÜR; 2; 5	SPA; 1; 27	SPA; 2; 24	SPA; 3; 23	HOC; 1; 9	HOC; 2; 9	1st	163

=== Complete Formula Renault Eurocup results ===
(key) (Races in bold indicate pole position) (Races in italics indicate fastest lap)

Year	Entrant	1	2	3	4	5	6	7	8	9	10	11	12	13	14	15	16	17	18	19	20	21	22	23	Pos	Points
2017	R-ace GP	MNZ; 1	MNZ; 2	SIL; 1	SIL; 2	PAU; 1	PAU; 2	MON; 1	MON; 2	HUN; 1	HUN; 2	HUN; 3	NÜR; 1	NÜR; 2	RBR; 1	RBR; 2	LEC; 1	LEC; 2; 14	SPA; 1; 15	SPA; 2; 27	SPA; 3; 24	CAT; 1; 23	CAT; 2	CAT; 3	NC†	0

† As Benyahia was a guest driver, he was ineligible for points

=== Complete Euroformula Open Championship results ===
(key) (Races in bold indicate pole position) (Races in italics indicate fastest lap)

Year	Entrant	1	2	3	4	5	6	7	8	9	10	11	12	13	14	15	16	Pos	Points
2018	RP Motorsport	EST; 1; 10	EST; 2; 13	LEC; 1 Ret	LEC; 2; 8	SPA; 1; 8	SPA; 2; 11	HUN; 1	HUN; 2	SIL; 1	SIL; 2	MNZ; 1	MNZ; 2	JER; 1	JER; 2	CAT; 1	CAT; 2	19th	9

=== Complete British GT Championship results ===
(key) (Races in bold indicate pole position in class) (Races in italics indicate fastest lap in class)

Year	Entrant	Chassis	Class	1	2	3	4	5	6	7	8	9	DC	Points
2021	Jenson Team Rocket RJN	McLaren 570S GT4	GT4	BRH; 1 Ret	SIL; 1; 21	DON; 1 Ret	SPA; 1 Ret	**SNE**; **1**; 19	SNE; 2; 12	OUL; 1; 16	OUL; 2; 13	DON; 1; 14	8th	67

Sporting positions
Preceded by Lando Norris	Formula Renault 2.0 NEC; Champion; 2017	Succeeded by Doureid Ghattas
