= 2016 French F4 Championship =

French auto racing season

Seasons
- ← 2015 2017 →

The 2016 French F4 Championship season was the 24th season of the series for 1600cc Formula Renault machinery, and the sixth season to run under the guise of the French F4 Championship. The series began on 1 April at Le Castellet and ended on 6 November at Montmeló, after six rounds and twenty-four races.

== Driver lineup ==
No.	Driver	Class	Rounds
1	(France) Marvin Klein	I	All
2	(France) Hugo Chevalier	J	All
3	(Denmark) Casper Røes Andersen	J	All
4	(Spain) Javier Cobián	I	All
5	(France) Pierre-Alexandre Jean	J	All
6	(Canada) Kami Moreira-Laliberté	G	2
6	(France) Victor Martins	J G	5
6	(France) Adrien Renaudin	I	6
7	(Poland) Alex Karkosik	J	All
8	(Mexico) José Sierra	I	2–6
11	(France) Tristan Charpentier	J	All
12	(France) Enzo Samon	J	1–4
13	(United Kingdom) Aaron di Comberti	J	1
16	(Belgium) Gilles Magnus	I	All
20	(China) Yifei Ye	J	All
21	(France) Jean-Baptiste Mela	I	All
24	(France) Pierre-Paul Baradat	I	1, 3–4, 6
27	(France) Théo Coicaud	I	All
51	(Morocco) Michael Benyahia	J	All
87	(France) Arthur Rougier	I	All

Icon	Status
I	Drivers that compete for the International Championship
J	Drivers that compete for the Junior Championship
G	Guest drivers that are ineligible to score points

== Driver Changes ==
=== Graduating from French F4 ===
- Giuliano Alesi, son of former F1 driver Jean Alesi, was signed by the Ferrari Driver Academy and promoted to GP3 with Trident.
- Sacha Fenestraz and Gabriel Aubrey were promoted to the Formula Renault 2.0 championship with Tech 1 Racing.
- Simo Laaksonen will compete in Germany's ADAC F4 after running French F4 and SMP F4 campaigns in 2015.
- Alternatively Nerses Isaakyan, Nikita Troitskiy and Aleksey Korneev will move to Formula Renault 2.0 for 2016 after partial French F4 seasons.
- Axel Matus returned to his home country to participate in the inaugural NACAM F4 championship.
- Louis Gachot, son of former F1 driver Bertrand Gachot, switched to ADAC F4 for 2016.

== Race calendar and results ==
A six-round calendar was published in December 2015. This was however revised in January 2016, with now four races per round being held, as opposed to the triple-header rounds that were run on previous years.

Race format

- Race 1 grid will be set by second fastest qualifying lap.
- Race 2 will be an inversion of the top 10 from race 1.
- Race 3 grid will be set by fastest qualifying lap.
- Race 4 will be set by the finishing order of race 3.

Round		Circuit	Date	Pole Position	Fastest Lap	Winning Driver	Junior Winner	International Winner
1	R1	(France) Circuit Paul Ricard, Le Castellet	2 April	(China) Yifei Ye	(China) Yifei Ye	(China) Yifei Ye	(China) Yifei Ye	(Spain) Javier Cobián
1	R2	(France) Circuit Paul Ricard, Le Castellet	2 April		(China) Yifei Ye	(China) Yifei Ye	(China) Yifei Ye	(France) Jean-Baptiste Mela
1	R3	(France) Circuit Paul Ricard, Le Castellet	3 April	(China) Yifei Ye	(China) Yifei Ye	(China) Yifei Ye	(China) Yifei Ye	(France) Théo Coicaud
1	R4	(France) Circuit Paul Ricard, Le Castellet	3 April		(China) Yifei Ye	(China) Yifei Ye	(China) Yifei Ye	(Spain) Javier Cobián
2	R1	(France) Circuit de Pau, Pau	14 May	(China) Yifei Ye	(Spain) Javier Cobián	(Spain) Javier Cobián	(Morocco) Michael Benyahia	(Spain) Javier Cobián
2	R2	(France) Circuit de Pau, Pau	14 May		(France) Hugo Chevalier	(France) Théo Coicaud	(France) Pierre-Alexandre Jean	(France) Théo Coicaud
2	R3	(France) Circuit de Pau, Pau	15 May	(China) Yifei Ye	(China) Yifei Ye	(China) Yifei Ye	(China) Yifei Ye	(Belgium) Gilles Magnus
2	R4	(France) Circuit de Pau, Pau	15 May		(China) Yifei Ye	(China) Yifei Ye	(China) Yifei Ye	(Belgium) Gilles Magnus
3	R1	(France) Circuit de Lédenon, Lédenon	4 June	(China) Yifei Ye	(China) Yifei Ye	(China) Yifei Ye	(China) Yifei Ye	(Belgium) Gilles Magnus
3	R2	(France) Circuit de Lédenon, Lédenon	4 June		(China) Yifei Ye	(China) Yifei Ye	(China) Yifei Ye	(Belgium) Gilles Magnus
3	R3	(France) Circuit de Lédenon, Lédenon	5 June	(China) Yifei Ye	(China) Yifei Ye	(China) Yifei Ye	(China) Yifei Ye	(France) Jean-Baptiste Mela
3	R4	(France) Circuit de Lédenon, Lédenon	5 June		(China) Yifei Ye	(China) Yifei Ye	(China) Yifei Ye	(Belgium) Gilles Magnus
4	R1	(France) Circuit de Nevers Magny-Cours, Magny-Cours	9 July		(China) Yifei Ye	(China) Yifei Ye	(China) Yifei Ye	(Spain) Javier Cobián
4	R2	(France) Circuit de Nevers Magny-Cours, Magny-Cours	9 July		(Spain) Javier Cobián	(France) Pierre-Alexandre Jean	(France) Pierre-Alexandre Jean	(Belgium) Gilles Magnus
4	R3	(France) Circuit de Nevers Magny-Cours, Magny-Cours	10 July	(China) Yifei Ye	(China) Yifei Ye	(China) Yifei Ye	(China) Yifei Ye	(Spain) Javier Cobián
4	R4	(France) Circuit de Nevers Magny-Cours, Magny-Cours	10 July		(China) Yifei Ye	(China) Yifei Ye	(China) Yifei Ye	(Belgium) Gilles Magnus
5	R1	(France) Bugatti Circuit, Le Mans	10 September	(China) Yifei Ye	(China) Yifei Ye	(China) Yifei Ye	(China) Yifei Ye	(Belgium) Gilles Magnus
5	R2	(France) Bugatti Circuit, Le Mans	10 September		(France) Tristan Charpentier	(France) Marvin Klein	(Denmark) Casper Røes Andersen	(France) Marvin Klein
5	R3	(France) Bugatti Circuit, Le Mans	11 September	(China) Yifei Ye	(Belgium) Gilles Magnus	(Belgium) Gilles Magnus	(France) Tristan Charpentier	(Belgium) Gilles Magnus
5	R4	(France) Bugatti Circuit, Le Mans	11 September		(Denmark) Casper Røes Andersen	(France) Tristan Charpentier	(France) Tristan Charpentier	(Belgium) Gilles Magnus
6	R1	(Spain) Circuit de Barcelona-Catalunya, Montmeló	5 November	(Spain) Javier Cobián	(France) Arthur Rougier	(Spain) Javier Cobián	(France) Hugo Chevalier	(Spain) Javier Cobián
6	R2	(Spain) Circuit de Barcelona-Catalunya, Montmeló	6 November		(China) Yifei Ye	(Morocco) Michael Benyahia	(Morocco) Michael Benyahia	(France) Jean-Baptiste Mela
6	R3	(Spain) Circuit de Barcelona-Catalunya, Montmeló	6 November	(Spain) Javier Cobián (Note: Pierre-Alexandre Jean originally scored pole, but he was issued a 5-place grid penalty after race 2.)	(France) Arthur Rougier	(France) Arthur Rougier	(France) Tristan Charpentier	(France) Arthur Rougier

== Championship standings ==
Points system

Points are awarded as follows:

Position	**1st**	**2nd**	**3rd**	**4th**	**5th**	**6th**	**7th**	**8th**	**9th**	**10th**	PP	FL
Points	25	18	15	12	10	8	6	4	2	1	**1**	1

=== French F4 Championship ===
Pos	Driver	LEC (France)				PAU (France)				LÉD (France)				MAG (France)				LMS (France)				CAT (Spain)			Points
1	(China) Yifei Ye	**1**	1	**1**	1	**3**	4	**1**	1	**1**	1	**1**	1	**1**	7	**1**	1	**1**	15	**Ret**	11	4	12	15	420
2	(Belgium) Gilles Magnus	16	6	6	7	5	2	2	3	2	4	3	3	3	2	3	2	2	8	1	2				278
3	(Morocco) Michael Benyahia	3	3	11	15	2	Ret	Ret	12	5	2	5	4	4	11	4	4	7	3	6	5	8	1	5	218
4	(Spain) Javier Cobián	4	13	Ret	4	1	Ret	Ret	9	6	9	7	15	2	3	2	3	10	7	7	8	**1**	6	**2**	211
5	(France) Tristan Charpentier	5	9	3	3	8	Ret	5	7	9	3	14	7	13	9	7	7	3	4	2	1	5	5	4	204
6	(France) Hugo Chevalier	2	2	2	2	6	8	10	Ret		6	9	5	8	5	5	5	15	11	8	6	2	4	14	188
7	(France) Théo Coicaud	7	Ret	5	16	Ret	1	7	4	14	7	6	Ret	5	6	14	8	5	5	4	4	15	7	3	173
8	(France) Pierre-Alexandre Jean	10	10	4	5	4	3	3	5	12	Ret	4	2	7	1	15	15	14	14	Ret	12	6	14	9	162
9	(France) Jean-Baptiste Mela	9	4	9	8	10	Ret	9	10	3	8	2	8	6	4	6	9	11	12	10	EX	7	3	7	129
10	(France) Arthur Rougier	11	7	8	6	7	6	4	6	8	10	13	11	11	8	13	12	8	6	Ret	Ret	3	15	1	119
11	(Denmark) Casper Røes Andersen	6	Ret	12	10	12	5	13	14	16	12	12	9	12	12	10	6	9	2	5	7	10	2	10	93
12	(France) Marvin Klein	12	8	10	14	Ret	Ret	12	8	15	11	10	13	9	14	9	10	6	1	11	13	13	9	11	55
13	(Mexico) José Sierra					11	Ret	14	11	11	5	8	6	15	15	12	13	12	9	9	10	12	8	8	40
14	(France) Enzo Samon	8	5	7	9	Ret	Ret	8	Ret	7	Ret	DNS	10	Ret	DNS	DNS	DNS								35
15	(Poland) Alex Karkosik	13	14	13	11	13	7	11	13	10	14	11	12	10	10	8	11	13	13	12	9	9	13	6	29
16	(France) Pierre-Paul Baradat	14	11	14	12					13	13	Ret	14	14	13	11	13					14	10	12	1
17	(United Kingdom) Aaron di Comberti	15	12	15	13																				0
18	(France) Adrien Renaudin																					11	11	13	0
Guest drivers ineligible for championship points
	(Canada) Kami Moreira-Laliberté					9	Ret	6	2																0
	(France) Victor Martins																	4	10	3	3				0
Pos	Driver	LEC (France)				PAU (France)				LÉD (France)				MAG (France)				LMS (France)				CAT (Spain)			Points

Colour	Result
Gold	Winner
Silver	Second place
Bronze	Third place
Green	Points classification
Blue	Non-points classification
Blue	Non-classified finish (NC)
Purple	Retired, not classified (Ret)
Red	Did not qualify (DNQ)
Red	Did not pre-qualify (DNPQ)
Black	Disqualified (DSQ)
White	Did not start (DNS)
White	Withdrew (WD)
White	Race cancelled (C)
Blank	Did not practice (DNP)
Blank	Did not arrive (DNA)
Blank	Excluded (EX)

**Bold** – Pole
Italics – Fastest Lap
