= Pierre-Alexandre Jean =

French racing driver (born 2001)

- Jean (left) in 2022
- Nationality: (France) French
- Born: 8 March 2001 (age 25) Lyon, France
- Categorisation: FIA Silver (2018–2022); FIA Gold (2023–)

Championship titles
- 2022: GT World Challenge Europe Sprint Cup – Silver

Pierre-Alexandre Jean (born 8 March 2001) is a French racing driver who last competed for AF Corse in the GT World Challenge Europe Sprint Cup.

== Career ==
Jean made his single-seater debut in 2016, racing in the FFSA Academy-centrally run French F4 Championship. After taking his maiden podiums at Pau and Lédenon, Jean scored his first series win and only one of the season at Magny-Cours en route to an eighth-place points finish. Returning to the series for 2017, Jean started the season with a double podium at Nogaro, followed up by his only win of the season in race two at Monza. In the following five rounds, Jean only finished on the overall podium in race one at Spa, to end the season fourth in points. Towards the end of 2017, Jean raced in the final three rounds of the V de V Challenge Monoplace for RC Formula, in which he won all three races at Estoril.

The following year, Jean joined Ginetta-fielding CMR to race in both the French GT4 Cup and GT4 European Series. After scoring one podium in the first two rounds, Jean switched to an Alpine A110 for the rest of the year, scoring wins at Magny-Cours and Le Castellet to end the year third in the Pro-Am standings. It was a similar case in the latter, in which the switch happened ahead of the Spa round, in which he won race two en route to an eighth-place points finish in the Silver class standings. At the end of the year, Jean raced in the GT4 International Cup for the same team, winning the only edition of the event alongside Pierre Sancinéna.

Continuing in GT4 competition for 2019, Jean remained with CMR for his sophomore year in both the GT4 European Series and the French GT4 Cup. Taking only two points finishes in the former, Jean found more success in the latter, winning both Nogaro races and taking further wins at Lédenon and Spa to secure runner-up honors. During 2019, Jean made a one-off appearance in the Blancpain GT Series Endurance Cup round at Barcelona for Saintéloc Racing, in which he took the Pro-Am spoils on debut.

Moving up to GT3 racing full-time the following year, Jean remained with CMR to race in both the GT World Challenge Europe Endurance and Sprint Cups, as a member of the Bentley Motorsport Academy. Enduring a scoreless season in the former, Jean scored a Silver Cup win and overall podium in the latter's Zandvoort round, as well as two other class podiums to finish the season sixth in the Silver standings. In 2021, Jean returned to CMR to race in the Sprint Cup full-time, scoring three Silver class podiums and a class pole at Zandvoort to once again end the season sixth in the class points. During 2021, Jean also raced in the last three rounds of the Endurance Cup for the same team, also in the Silver class.

Jean's AF Corse Ferrari 488 GT3 Evo at Magny-Cours in 2022.

Jean remained in the Sprint Cup for 2022, as he joined Ferrari-affiliated AF Corse for this third season in the series. Driving alongside Ulysse de Pauw, the pair scored outright wins at Brands Hatch and Valencia, as well as taking four other class wins to seal the Silver class title with a round to spare. During 2022, Jean also raced in the 24 Hours of Spa for Audi-fielding Tresor by Car Collection.

== Karting record ==
=== Karting career summary ===
Season	Series	Team	Position
2015	Championnat de France — Nationale	Action Karting	61st
2015	National Series Karting — Nationale		32nd
2015	Coupe de France — Nationale	Action Karting	NC

== Racing record ==
=== Racing career summary ===
Season	Series	Team	Races	Wins	Poles	F/Laps	Podiums	Points	Position
2016	French F4 Championship	FFSA Academy	23	1	0	0	4	162	8th
2017	French F4 Championship	FFSA Academy	21	1	0	0	4	150	4th
2017	V de V Challenge Monoplace	RC Formula	9	3	3	2	4	404.5	9th
2018	French GT4 Cup – Pro-Am	CMR	12	2	1	0	5	136	**3rd**
2018	GT4 European Series – Silver	CMR	12	1	1	0	4	96	8th
2018	GT4 International Cup	CMR	1	1	0	0	1	—N/a	**1st**
2019	French GT4 Cup – Pro-Am	CMR	12	4	1	2	4	116	**2nd**
2019	GT4 European Series – Silver	CMR	7	0	0	0	0	10	22nd
2019	Blancpain GT Series Endurance Cup	Saintéloc Racing	1	0	0	0	0	0	NC
2019	Blancpain GT Series Endurance Cup – Pro-Am	Saintéloc Racing	1	1	0	0	1	25	14th
2020	GT World Challenge Europe Endurance Cup	CMR	5	0	0	0	0	0	NC
2020	GT World Challenge Europe Sprint Cup	CMR	10	0	0	0	1	15	15th
2020	GT World Challenge Europe Sprint Cup – Silver	CMR	10	1	0	0	3	65.5	6th
2021	GT World Challenge Europe Sprint Cup	CMR	10	0	0	0	1	22.5	13th
2021	GT World Challenge Europe Sprint Cup – Silver	CMR	10	0	2	1	4	66.5	6th
2021	GT World Challenge Europe Endurance Cup	CMR	3	0	0	0	0	0	NC
2021	GT World Challenge Europe Endurance Cup – Silver	CMR	3	0	0	0	0	8	29th
2022	GT World Challenge Europe Sprint Cup	AF Corse	10	2	2	0	2	62.5	4th
2022	GT World Challenge Europe Sprint Cup – Silver	AF Corse	10	6	6	4	9	141.5	**1st**
2022	GT World Challenge Europe Endurance Cup	Tresor by Car Collection	1	0	0	0	0	0	NC
2022	GT World Challenge Europe Endurance Cup – Silver	Tresor by Car Collection	1	0	0	0	0	6	28th

=== Complete French F4 Championship results ===
(key) (Races in bold indicate pole position) (Races in italics indicate fastest lap)

Year	1	2	3	4	5	6	7	8	9	10	11	12	13	14	15	16	17	18	19	20	21	22	23	Pos	Points
2016	LEC; 1; 10	LEC; 2; 10	LEC; 3; 4	LEC; 4; 5	PAU; 1; 4	PAU; 2; 3	PAU; 3; 3	PAU; 4; 5	LÉD; 1; 12	LÉD; 2 Ret	LÉD; 3; 4	LÉD; 4; 2	MAG; 1; 7	MAG; 2; 1	MAG; 3; 15	MAG; 4; 15	LMS; 1; 14	LMS; 2; 14	LMS; 3 Ret	LMS; 4; 12	CAT; 1; 6	CAT; 2; 14	CAT; 3; 9	8th	162
2017	NOG; 1; 2	NOG; 2; 7	NOG; 3; 2	MNZ; 1; 4	MNZ; 2; 1	MNZ; 3; 14	PAU; 1 Ret	PAU; 2; 11	PAU; 3; 4	SPA; 1; 2	SPA; 2; 4	SPA; 3; 9	MAG; 1; 13	MAG; 2; 8	MAG; 3; 8	CAT; 1; 11	CAT; 2; 14	CAT; 3; 13	LEC; 1; 5	LEC; 2; 4	LEC; 3; 5			4th	150

=== Complete French GT4 Cup results ===
(key) (Races in bold indicate pole position) (Races in italics indicate fastest lap)

Year	Team	Car	Class	1	2	3	4	5	6	7	8	9	10	11	12	Pos.	Points
2018	CMR	Ginetta G55 GT4	Pro-Am	NOG; 1; 4	NOG; 2; 3	PAU; 1; 15	PAU; 2 Ret									3rd	136
2018	CMR	Alpine A110 GT4	Pro-Am					DIJ; 1 Ret	DIJ; 2; 5	MAG; 1; 3	MAG; 2; 1	CAT; 1; 4	CAT; 2; 11	**LEC**; **1**; 2	LEC; 2; 1	3rd	136
2019	CMR	Alpine A110 GT4	Pro-Am	NOG; 1; 1	NOG; 2; 1	PAU; 1; 13	PAU; 2; 33	LED; 1 DSQ	LED; 2; 1	**SPA**; **1**; 1	**SPA**; **2**; 30	MAG; 1; 10	MAG; 2; 13	LEC; 1; 9	LEC; 2; 6	2nd	116

=== Complete GT4 European Series results ===
(key) (Races in bold indicate pole position) (Races in italics indicate fastest lap)

Year	Team	Car	Class	1	2	3	4	5	6	7	8	9	10	11	12	Pos	Points
2018	CMR	Ginetta G55 GT4	Silver	ZOL; 1; 3	ZOL; 2; 4	BRH; 1; 7	BRH; 2; 7	MIS; 1; 7	MIS; 2 Ret							8th	96
2018	CMR	Alpine A110 GT4	Silver							SPA; 1; 3	**SPA**; **2**; 1	HUN; 1; 32	HUN; 2; 38	NÜR; 1; 9	NÜR; 2 Ret	8th	96
2019	CMR	Alpine A110 GT4	Silver	MNZ; 1; 11	MNZ; 2; 19	BRH; 1 Ret	BRH; 2 DNS	LEC; 1 Ret	LEC; 2 Ret	MIS; 1; 10	MIS; 2; 28	ZAN; 1	ZAN; 2	NÜR; 1	NÜR; 2	22nd	10

=== Complete GT World Challenge results ===
==== GT World Challenge Europe Endurance Cup ====
(Races in bold indicate pole position) (Races in italics indicate fastest lap)

Year	Team	Car	Class	1	2	3	4	5	6	7	Pos.	Points
2019	Saintéloc Racing	Audi R8 LMS Evo	Pro-Am	MNZ	SIL	LEC	SPA; 6H	SPA; 12H	SPA; 24H	CAT; 11	14th	25
2020	CMR	Bentley Continental GT3	Pro	IMO; Ret	NÜR; 15	SPA; 6H; 49	SPA; 12H; 41	SPA; 24H; 33	LEC; Ret		NC	0
2021	CMR	Bentley Continental GT3	Silver	MON	LEC	SPA; 6H; 20	SPA; 12H; 29	SPA; 24H; Ret	NÜR; 28	CAT; 32	29th	8
2022	Tresor by Car Collection	Audi R8 LMS Evo II	Silver	IMO	LEC	SPA; 6H; 21	SPA; 12H; Ret	SPA; 24H; Ret	HOC	CAT	28th	6

==== GT World Challenge Europe Sprint Cup ====
(key) (Races in bold indicate pole position) (Races in italics indicate fastest lap)

Year	Team	Car	Class	1	2	3	4	5	6	7	8	9	10	Pos.	Points
2020	CMR	Bentley Continental GT3	Silver	MIS; 1 Ret	MIS; 2; 11	MIS; 3; 15	MAG; 1; 14	MAG; 2 Ret	ZAN; 1; 2	ZAN; 2; 8	CAT; 1; 13	CAT; 2; 10	CAT; 3; 10	6th	65.5
2021	CMR	Bentley Continental GT3	Silver	MAG; 1; 9	MAG; 2; 7	ZAN; 1; 3	**ZAN**; **2**; 5	**MIS**; **1** Ret	MIS; 2; 16	BRH; 1; 7	BRH; 2; 12	VAL; 1 Ret	VAL; 2; 15	6th	66.5
2022	AF Corse	Ferrari 488 GT3 Evo 2020	Silver	**BRH**; **1**; 1	**BRH**; **2**; 5	MAG; 1; 7	**MAG**; **2**; 5	**ZAN**; **1**; 4	ZAN; 2; 9	MIS; 1; 8	**MIS**; **2**; 8	**VAL**; **1**; 1	VAL; 2; 17	1st	141.5
