= Charlie Fagg =

British racing driver (born 1999)

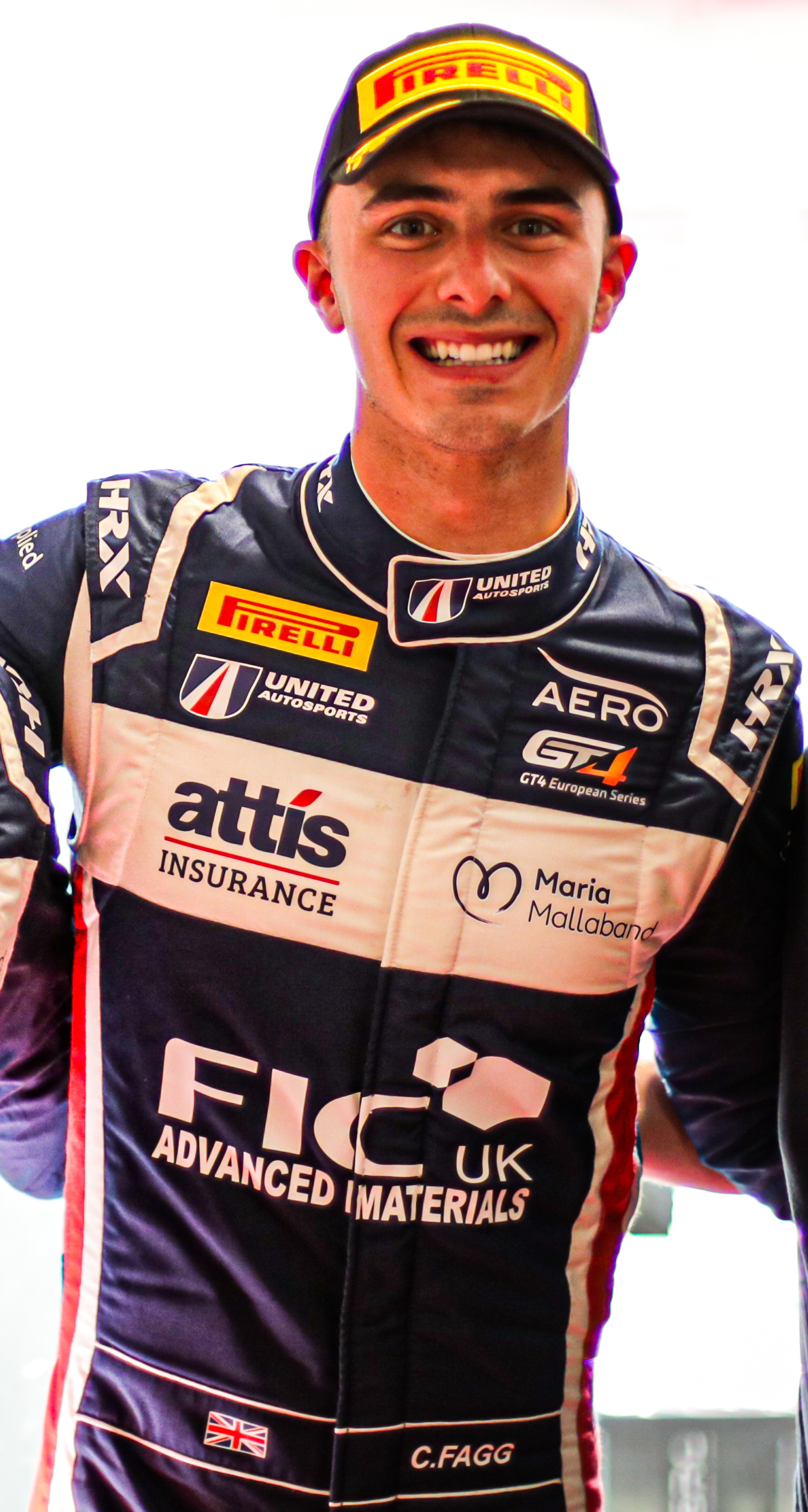
- Nationality: (United Kingdom) British
- Born: 18 August 1999 (age 27) Durham, United Kingdom

Super GT career
- Debut season: 2024
- Current team: D'station Racing
- Categorisation: FIA Silver (until 2022); FIA Gold (2023–)
- Car number: 777
- Starts: 15
- Wins: 2
- Podiums: 4
- Poles: 2
- Fastest laps: 2
- Best finish: 5th in 2024

Previous series
- 2023 2023 2023 2022 2021 2018 2018: Intercontinental GT Challenge; International GT Open; Asian Le Mans Series; FIA World Endurance Championship; GT4 European Series; ADAC GT4 Germany; British GT Championship

Championship titles
- 2023 2021: International GT Open; GT4 European Series - Silver Cup

Charles Fagg (born 18 August 1999) is a British racing driver who currently competes in Super GT for D'station Racing. He is the 2023 International GT Open champion.

== Career ==
=== GT4 European Series ===
In 2021, Fagg competed in GT4 European Series. with United Autosports alongside Bailey Voisin. Fagg and Voisin won the title.

=== FIA World Endurance Championship ===
Fagg joined D'station Racing for the 2022 FIA World Endurance Championship LMGTE Am class alongside the team's owner Satoshi Hoshino, and team manager Tomonobu Fujii.

=== International GT Open ===
For 2023, Fagg moved to International GT Open with Optimum Motorsport's McLaren 720S GT3 alongside Samuel De Haan. The pair won the title in the series.

=== Super GT ===
Fagg competed in Super GT in 2024 with his old team in the WEC, D'station Racing as the third driver in the team. He was joined by his former teammate Fujii, and Denmark's Marco Sørensen. Fagg also replaced Sørensen for couple of rounds after Sørensen prioritized his WEC campaign. Fagg made his debut in Fuji Speedway round 2. He set the fastest time in his qualiflying group, and also the fastest lap in the race.

== Racing record ==
=== Career summary ===
Season	Series	Team	Races	Wins	Poles	F/Laps	Podiums	Points	Position
2014	Ginetta Junior Winter Series	HHC	4	0	0	0	0	31	14th
2015	Ginetta Junior Championship	HHC Motorsport	12	0	0	0	0	99	19th
2015	Ginetta Junior Winter Series	HHC Motorsport	4	0	0	0	1	?	?
2016	Ginetta Junior Championship	HHC Motorsport	25	0	0	0	2	342	9th
2016	Ginetta Junior Winter Series	HHC Motorsport	4	0	0	0	1	84	4th
2017	GT4 European Series Northern Cup - Silver	Sean Walkinshaw Racing	4	0	0	0	0	71	7th
2017	GT4 European Series Northern Cup - Silver	Ebor GT Motorsport	2	2	1	2	2	71	7th
2017	British GT Championship - GT4	Ebor GT	2	2	0	0	2	0	NC†
2017	British GT Championship - GT3	JRM Racing	1	0	0	0	0	15	15th
2018	British GT Championship - GT4	Tolman Motorsport	9	0	1	1	4	122	**3rd**
2019	ADAC GT4 Germany	Team GT	12	1	1	4	2	105	6th
2019	GT4 European Series - Silver Cup	Team GT	4	0	1	0	1	20	16th
2019	China GT Championship - GT4		6	0	0	0	1	75	14th
2021	GT4 European Series - Silver	United Autosports	12	3	2	1	6	191	**1st**
2021	Pure McLaren GT Series		1	0	0	0	0	0	NC†
2022	FIA World Endurance Championship - LMGTE Am	D'station Racing	6	0	0	0	1	35	14th
2022	GT World Challenge Europe Endurance Cup	Beechdean AMR	1	0	0	0	0	0	NC
2022	GT World Challenge Europe Endurance Cup - Silver Cup	Beechdean AMR	1	0	0	0	0	0	NC
2023	International GT Open	Optimum Motorsport	13	2	1	1	5	119	**1st**
2023	GT World Challenge Europe Endurance Cup	Optimum Motorsport	5	0	0	0	0	7	21st
2023	GT World Challenge Europe Endurance Cup - Gold Cup	Optimum Motorsport	5	1	1	0	2	70	6th
2023	Asian Le Mans Series - GT	D'station Racing	4	0	0	0	0	16	9th
2024	Super GT - GT300	D'station Racing	7	1	1	1	2	59	4th
2025	Super GT - GT300	D'station Racing	8	1	1	1	2	60.5	12th
2026	Super GT - GT300	D'station Racing	8	1	1	1	1	59	8th
2026	International GT Open	Norik Racing	7	0	0	0	0	0	58th
2026	Le Mans Cup - GT3	AF Corse	1	0	0	0	0	0	NC†
2026	Nürburgring Langstrecken-Serie - VT2-RWD	SRS Team Sorg Rennsport							

* Season still in progress.

=== Complete GT4 European Series results ===
(key) (Races in bold indicate pole position) (Races in italics indicate fastest lap)

Year	Team	Car	Class	1	2	3	4	5	6	7	8	9	10	11	12	Pos	Points
2019	Team GT	McLaren 570S GT4	Silver	**IMO**; **1**; 2	IMO; 2 Ret	BRH; 1	BRH; 2	LEC; 1; 16	LEC; 2; 21	MIS; 1	MIS; 2	ZAN; 1	ZAN; 2	NÜR; 1	NÜR; 2	16th	20
2021	United Autosports	McLaren 570S GT4	Silver	MNZ; 1; 1	MNZ; 2; 1	LEC; 1; 3	LEC; 2; 6	ZAN; 1; 10	**ZAN**; **2**; 7	**SPA**; **1**; 1	SPA; 2; 4	**NÜR**; **1**; 2	NÜR; 2; 2	CAT; 1; 10	CAT; 2; 10	1st	193

=== Complete FIA World Endurance Championship results ===
(key) (Races in bold indicate pole position; races in italics indicate fastest lap)

Year	Entrant	Class	Chassis	Engine	1	2	3	4	5	6	Rank	Points
2022	D'station Racing	LMGTE Am	Aston Martin Vantage AMR	Aston Martin 4.0 L Turbo V8	SEB; 6	SPA; 7	LMS; Ret	MNZ; 11	FUJ; 3	BHR; 10	14th	35

=== Complete International GT Open results ===
(key) (Races in bold indicate pole position; races in italics indicate fastest lap)

Year	Team	Car	Class	1	2	3	4	5	6	7	8	9	10	11	12	13	14	Pos.	Points
2023	Optimum Motorsport	McLaren 720S GT3	Pro	ALG; 1; 2	ALG; 2; 4	SPA; 1	HUN; 1; 4	HUN; 2; 4	LEC; 1; 1	LEC; 2; 6	RBR; 1; 24†	**RBR**; **2**; 2	MNZ; 1; 10	MNZ; 2; 4	CAT; 1 Ret	CAT; 2; 2		1st	119
2026	Norik Racing	Ferrari 296 GT3	Pro-Am	ALG; 1 WD	ALG; 2 WD	SPA	MIS; 1; 7	MIS; 2; 4	HUN; 1	HUN; 2								16th	17
2026	Norik Racing	Ferrari 296 GT3 Evo	Pro-Am								LEC; 1; 7	LEC; 2; 9	HOC; 1	HOC; 2	MNZ; 11	CAT; 1; 7	CAT; 2; 4	16th	17

=== Complete Super GT results ===
(key) (Races in bold indicate pole position; races in italics indicate fastest lap)

Year	Team	Car	Class	1	2	3	4	5	6	7	8	9	DC	Points
2024	D'station Racing	Aston Martin Vantage AMR GT3 Evo	GT300	OKA	FUJ; 16	**SUZ**; 1^{1}	FUJ; 4	SUG; 3^{3}	AUT; 5^{3}	MOT; 6	SUZ; 6		4th	59
2025	D'station Racing	Aston Martin Vantage AMR GT3 Evo	GT300	OKA; 24	**FUJ**; 2	SEP; 6	FS1; 1	FS2 (1)	SUZ; 24	SUG; Ret	AUT; 21	MOT; 12	12th	60.5
2026	D'station Racing	Aston Martin Vantage AMR GT3 Evo	GT300	**OKA**; 1	FUJ; 7	FUJ; 24	SUZ; 4	SUG; 21	AUT; 20	MOT; Ret	MOT; 5		8th	59

^{‡} Half points awarded as less than 75% of race distance was completed.
^{(Number)} Driver did not take part in this sprint race, points are still awarded for the teammate's result.
^{*} Season still in progress.
