= 2019 ADAC GT4 Germany =

Motorsport season

The 2019 ADAC GT4 Germany season was the inaugural season of the ADAC GT4 Germany, a sports car championship created and organised by the ADAC. The season began on 27 April at Oschersleben and ended on 29 September at the Sachsenring after six double-header meetings.

== Entry list ==
Team	Car	No.	Drivers	Class	Rounds
(Switzerland) Hofor Racing by Bonk Motorsport	BMW M4 GT4	2	(Austria) Thomas Jäger		1–3
(Switzerland) Hofor Racing by Bonk Motorsport	BMW M4 GT4	2	(Germany) Michael Schrey		1–3
(Switzerland) Hofor Racing by Bonk Motorsport	BMW M4 GT4	3	(Austria) Michael Fischer		1–3
(Switzerland) Hofor Racing by Bonk Motorsport	BMW M4 GT4	3	(Germany) Claudia Hürtgen		1–3
(Germany) Racing One	Audi R8 LMS GT4	5	(Switzerland) Nico Rindlisbacher		1–3
(Germany) Racing One	Audi R8 LMS GT4	5	(Latvia) Patricija Stalidzane	J	1–3
(Germany) Racing One	Audi R8 LMS GT4	6	(Germany) Mike Beckhusen	J	1–3
(Germany) Racing One	Audi R8 LMS GT4	6	(Germany) Markus Lungstrass (Note: Markus Lungstrass only drove in Race 1 at Oschersleben, while Jules Szymkowiak only drove in Race 2. They both shared the car with Mike Beckhusen.)		1–3
(Germany) Racing One	Audi R8 LMS GT4	6	(Netherlands) Jules Szymkowiak		1
(Germany) RN Vision STS	BMW M4 GT4	7	(Italy) Gabriele Piana		1–3
(Germany) RN Vision STS	BMW M4 GT4	7	(Germany) Marius Zug	J	1–3
(Germany) Bremotion	Mercedes-AMG GT4	11	(Germany) Oliver Mayer	T	1–3
(Germany) Bremotion	Mercedes-AMG GT4	11	(Germany) Jan Philipp Springob	J	1–3
(Germany) MRS Besagroup Racing	BMW M4 GT4	14	(Germany) Georg Braun	T	1–3
(Germany) MRS Besagroup Racing	BMW M4 GT4	14	(Germany) Stephan Grotstollen	T	1–3
(Germany) MRS Besagroup Racing	BMW M4 GT4	15	(Croatia) Franjo Kovac	T	1–3
(Germany) MRS Besagroup Racing	BMW M4 GT4	15	(Germany) Thomas Tekaat		1–3
(Germany) KÜS Team75 Bernhard	Porsche 718 Cayman GT4 Clubsport	17	(Germany) Horst Hadergasser	T	1–3
(Germany) KÜS Team75 Bernhard	Porsche 718 Cayman GT4 Clubsport	17	(Germany) Hendrik Still		1–3
(Germany) PROpeak Performance	Aston Martin Vantage AMR GT4	18	(France) Jérémie Lesoudier		1–2
(Germany) PROpeak Performance	Aston Martin Vantage AMR GT4	18	(Switzerland) Florian Thoma		1–2
(Germany) PROpeak Performance	Aston Martin Vantage AMR GT4	18	(Austria) David Griessner		3
(Germany) PROpeak Performance	Aston Martin Vantage AMR GT4	18	(India) Akhil Rabindra		3
(Germany) PROpeak Performance	Aston Martin Vantage AMR GT4	19	(Finland) Joonas Lappalainen		1–3
(Germany) PROpeak Performance	Aston Martin Vantage AMR GT4	19	(Germany) Jörg Viebahn	T	1–3
(Germany) Team Allied-Racing	Porsche 718 Cayman GT4 Clubsport	21	(Belgium) Glenn Van Parijs		1–3
(Germany) Team Allied-Racing	Porsche 718 Cayman GT4 Clubsport	21	(Austria) Nicolas Schöll		1
(Germany) Team Allied-Racing	Porsche 718 Cayman GT4 Clubsport	21	(Austria) Constantin Schöll		2–3
(Germany) Team Allied-Racing	Porsche 718 Cayman GT4 Clubsport	22	(Germany) Jan Kasperlik	T	1–2
(Germany) Team Allied-Racing	Porsche 718 Cayman GT4 Clubsport	22	(Germany) Lars Kern		1–2
(Germany) Team GT	McLaren 570S GT4	33	(Morocco) Michaël Benyahia	J	1–3
(Germany) Team GT	McLaren 570S GT4	33	(United Kingdom) Charlie Fagg	J	1–3
(Germany) Team GT	McLaren 570S GT4	94	(Germany) Felix von der Laden		1–3
(Germany) Team GT	McLaren 570S GT4	94	(Switzerland) Alain Valente		1–3
(Germany) Schütz Motorsport	Mercedes-AMG GT4	36	(Germany) Markus Suabo	T	1–3
(Germany) Schütz Motorsport	Mercedes-AMG GT4	36	(Germany) Alexander Woller		1–2
(Germany) Schütz Motorsport	Mercedes-AMG GT4	36	(Germany) Marcus Suabo	T	3
(Germany) Leipert Motorsport	Mercedes-AMG GT4	48	(Australia) Morgan Haber		1–3
(Germany) Leipert Motorsport	Mercedes-AMG GT4	48	(Germany) Luca Trefz	J	1–3
(Germany) Dörr Motorsport	McLaren 570S GT4	59	(Denmark) Thomas Krebs		1–3
(Germany) Dörr Motorsport	McLaren 570S GT4	59	(United Kingdom) Fred Martin-Dye		1–3
(Germany) Dörr Motorsport	McLaren 570S GT4	69	(Germany) Phil Dörr	J	1–3
(Germany) Dörr Motorsport	McLaren 570S GT4	69	(United States) Dennis Trebing		1–3
(Austria) HP Racing International	Porsche Cayman GT4 Clubsport MR	66	(Germany) Daniel Davidovac	T	1–2
(Austria) HP Racing International	Porsche Cayman GT4 Clubsport MR	66	(Poland) Franz Dziwok	T	1–3
(Austria) HP Racing International	Porsche Cayman GT4 Clubsport MR	66	(Germany) Fidel Leib	T	3
(Austria) HP Racing International	Mercedes-AMG GT4	77	(Germany) Tim Heinemann		1–2
(Austria) HP Racing International	Mercedes-AMG GT4	77	(Germany) Luke Wankmüller	J	1–2
(Germany) GetSpeed Performance	Mercedes-AMG GT4	99	(Germany) Hamza Owega		1–3
(Germany) GetSpeed Performance	Mercedes-AMG GT4	99	(Germany) Jusuf Owega	J	1–3
(Germany) Felbermayr - Reiter	KTM X-Bow GT4	24	(Norway) Mads Siljehaug	J	3
(Germany) Felbermayr - Reiter	KTM X-Bow GT4	24	(Austria) Eike Angermayr	J	3

Icon	Legend
J	Junior
T	Trophy

== Race calendar and results ==
On 23 September 2018, the ADAC announced the 2019 calendar.

Round		Circuit	Date	Pole position	Race winner
1	R1	(Germany) Motorsport Arena Oschersleben	27 April	(Germany) No. 18 PROpeak Performance	(Germany) No. 7 RN Vision STS
1	R1	(Germany) Motorsport Arena Oschersleben	27 April	(France) Jérémie Lesoudier (Switzerland) Florian Thoma	(Italy) Gabriele Piana (Germany) Marius Zug
1	R2	(Germany) Motorsport Arena Oschersleben	28 April	(Germany) No. 22 Team Allied-Racing	(Austria) No. 23 True Racing
1	R2	(Germany) Motorsport Arena Oschersleben	28 April	(Germany) Jan Kasperlik (Germany) Lars Kern	(Austria) Reinhard Kofler (Austria) Laura Kraihamer
2	R1	(Austria) Red Bull Ring	7 June	(Germany) No. 15 MRS Besagroup Racing	(Switzerland) No. 2 Hofor Racing by Bonk Motorsport
2	R1	(Austria) Red Bull Ring	7 June	(Germany) Thomas Tekaat (Croatia) Franjo Kovac	(Germany) Michael Schrey (Austria) Thomas Jäger
2	R2	(Austria) Red Bull Ring	8 June	(Germany) No. 94 Team GT	(Germany) No. 94 Team GT
2	R2	(Austria) Red Bull Ring	8 June	(Germany) Felix von der Laden (Switzerland) Alain Valente	(Germany) Felix von der Laden (Switzerland) Alain Valente
3	R1	(Netherlands) Circuit Zandvoort	9 August	(Germany) No. 7 RN Vision STS	(Germany) No. 7 RN Vision STS
3	R1	(Netherlands) Circuit Zandvoort	9 August	(Germany) Marius Zug (Italy) Gabriele Piana	(Germany) Marius Zug (Italy) Gabriele Piana
3	R2	(Netherlands) Circuit Zandvoort	10 August	(Germany) GetSpeed Performance	
3	R2	(Netherlands) Circuit Zandvoort	10 August	(Germany) Hamza Owega (Germany) Jusuf Owega	
4	R1	(Germany) Nürburgring	17 August		
4	R2	(Germany) Nürburgring	18 August		
5	R1	(Germany) Hockenheimring	14 September		
5	R2	(Germany) Hockenheimring	15 September		
6	R1	(Germany) Sachsenring	28 September		
6	R2	(Germany) Sachsenring	29 September		

== Championship standings ==
Scoring system

Championship points are awarded for the first fifteen positions in each race. Entries are required to complete 75% of the winning car's race distance in order to be classified and earn points. Individual drivers are required to participate for a minimum of 25 minutes in order to earn championship points in any race.

Position	**1st**	**2nd**	**3rd**	**4th**	**5th**	**6th**	**7th**	**8th**	**9th**	**10th**	**11th**	**12th**	**13th**	**14th**	**15th**
Points	25	20	16	13	11	10	9	8	7	6	5	4	3	2	1

=== Drivers' championships ===
==== Overall ====
Pos.	Driver	Team	OSC (Germany)		RBR (Austria)	ZAN (Netherlands)	NÜR (Germany)	HOC (Germany)	SAC (Germany)	Points
1	(Italy) Gabriele Piana (Germany) Marius Zug	(Germany) RN Vision STS	1	9						32
1	(Austria) Reinhard Kofler (Austria) Laura Kraihamer	(Austria) True Racing	9	1						32
2	(Germany) Jan Kasperlik (Germany) Lars Kern	(Germany) Team Allied-Racing	3	**3**						32
3	(Austria) Eike Angermayr (Norway) Mads Siljehaug	(Germany) Felbermayr - Reiter	5	2						31
4	(Germany) Hamza Owega (Germany) Jusuf Owega	(Germany) GetSpeed Performance	2	6						30
5	(Austria) Michael Fischer (Germany) Claudia Hürtgen	(Switzerland) Hofor Racing by Bonk Motorsport	10	5						17
6	(Australia) Morgan Haber (Germany) Luca Trefz	(Germany) Leipert Motorsport	8	7						17
7	(Austria) Thomas Jäger (Germany) Michael Schrey	(Switzerland) Hofor Racing by Bonk Motorsport	19	4						13
7	(Germany) Tim Heinemann (Germany) Luke Wankmüller	(Germany) HP Racing International	4	Ret						13
8	(Germany) Felix von der Laden (Switzerland) Alain Valente	(Germany) Team GT	6	Ret						10
9	(Germany) Phil Dörr (United States) Dennis Trebing	(Germany) Dörr Motorsport	11	11						10
10	(Germany) Horst Hadergasser (Germany) Hendrik Still	(Germany) KÜS Team75 Bernhard	7	16						9
11	(Finland) Joonas Lappalainen (Germany) Jörg Viebahn	(Germany) PROpeak Performance	Ret	8						8
12	(Belgium) Glenn van Parijs (Austria) Nicolas Schöll	(Germany) Team Allied-Racing	16	10						6
13	(Germany) Georg Braun (Germany) Stephan Grotstollen	(Germany) MRS Besagroup Racing	13	13						6
14	(Germany) Oliver Mayer (Germany) Jan Philipp Springob	(Germany) Bremotion	12	15						5
14	(Denmark) Thomas Krebs (United Kingdom) Fred Martin-Dye	(Germany) Dörr Motorsport	15	12						5
15	(Germany) Daniel Davidovac (Poland) Franz Dziwok	(Germany) HP Racing International	18	14						2
15	(Switzerland) Nico Rindlisbacher (Latvia) Patricija Stalidzane	(Germany) Racing One	14	DSQ						2
	(Germany) Markus Suabo (Germany) Alexander Woller	(Germany) Schütz Motorsport	17	18						0
	(Croatia) Franjo Kovac (Germany) Thomas Tekaat	(Germany) MRS Besagroup Racing	21	17						0
	(Germany) Mike Beckhusen	(Germany) Racing One	20	19						0
	(Netherlands) Jules Szymkowiak	(Germany) Racing One		19						0
	(Germany) Markus Lungstrass	(Germany) Racing One	20							0
	(Morocco) Michaël Benyahia (United Kingdom) Charlie Fagg	(Germany) Team GT	Ret	Ret						
	(France) Jérémie Lesoudier (Switzerland) Florian Thoma	(Germany) PROpeak Performance	**Ret**	DNS						
Pos.	Driver	Team	OSC (Germany)		RBR (Austria)	ZAN (Netherlands)	NÜR (Germany)	HOC (Germany)	SAC (Germany)	Points

Key
Colour	Result
Gold	Race winner
Silver	2nd place
Bronze	3rd place
Green	Points finish
Blue	Non-points finish
Blue	Non-classified finish (NC)
Purple	Did not finish (Ret)
Black	Disqualified (DSQ)
Black	Excluded (EX)
White	Did not start (DNS)
White	Race cancelled (C)
White	Withdrew (WD)
Blank	Did not participate

**Bold** – Pole
Italics – Fastest Lap

==== Junior Cup ====
Pos.	Driver	Team	Points
1	(Germany) Marius Zug	(Germany) RN Vision STS	57
2	(Germany) Luca Trefz	(Germany) Leipert Motorsport	40.5
3	(Germany) Jusuf Owega	(Germany) GetSpeed Performance	40
4	(Austria) Eike Angermayr	(Germany) Felbermayr - Reiter	38
5	(Germany) Jan Philipp Springob	(Germany) Bremotion	38
6	(Germany) Phil Dörr	(Germany) Dörr Motorsport	31.5
7	(Germany) Luke Wankmüller	(Germany) HP Racing International	16
8	(Germany) Mike Beckhusen	(Germany) Racing One	16
9	(Latvia) Patricija Stalidzane	(Germany) Racing One	8
	(Morocco) Michaël Benyahia (United Kingdom) Charlie Fagg	(Germany) Team GT	

==== Trophy Cup ====
Pos.	Driver	Team	Points
1	(Germany) Jan Kasperlik	(Germany) Team Allied-Racing	75
2	(Germany) Georg Braun (Germany) Stephan Grotstollen	(Germany) MRS Besagroup Racing	58
3	(Germany) Oliver Mayer	(Germany) Bremotion	54
4	(Germany) Daniel Davidovac (Poland) Franz Dziwok	(Germany) HP Racing International	46
5	(Germany) Horst Hadergasser	(Germany) KÜS Team75 Bernhard	45
6	(Croatia) Franjo Kovac	(Germany) MRS Besagroup Racing	36
7	(Germany) Jörg Viebahn	(Germany) PROpeak Performance	30
8	(Germany) Markus Suabo	(Germany) Schütz Motorsport	28.5

=== Teams' championship ===
Pos.	Team	Manufacturer	OSC (Germany)		RBR (Austria)	ZAN (Netherlands)	NÜR (Germany)	HOC (Germany)	SAC (Germany)	Points
1	(Germany) RN Vision STS	BMW	1	9						33
2	(Austria) True Racing	KTM	9	1						32
3	(Germany) Team Allied-Racing	Porsche	3	**3**						32
4	(Germany) GetSpeed Performance	Mercedes-AMG	2	6						31
4	(Germany) Felbermayr - Reiter	KTM	5	2						31
5	(Switzerland) Hofor Racing by Bonk Motorsport	BMW	10	4						19
6	(Germany) HP Racing International	Mercedes-AMG; Porsche	4	14						18
7	(Germany) Leipert Motorsport	Mercedes-AMG	8	7						18
8	(Germany) KÜS Team75 Bernhard	Porsche	7	16						12
9	(Germany) Dörr Motorsport	McLaren	11	11						12
10	(Germany) Team GT	McLaren	6	Ret						10
11	(Germany) PROpeak Performance	Aston Martin	**Ret**	8						9
12	(Germany) MRS Besagroup Racing	BMW	13	13						9
13	(Germany) Bremotion	Mercedes-AMG	12	15						8
14	(Germany) Racing One	Audi	14	19						3
14	(Germany) Schütz Motorsport	Mercedes-AMG	17	18						3
Pos.	Team	Manufacturer	OSC (Germany)		RBR (Austria)	ZAN (Netherlands)	NÜR (Germany)	HOC (Germany)	SAC (Germany)	Points

== See also ==
- 2019 French GT4 Cup
- 2019 GT4 European Series
- 2019 GT4 South European Series
