= Marius Zug =

German racing driver

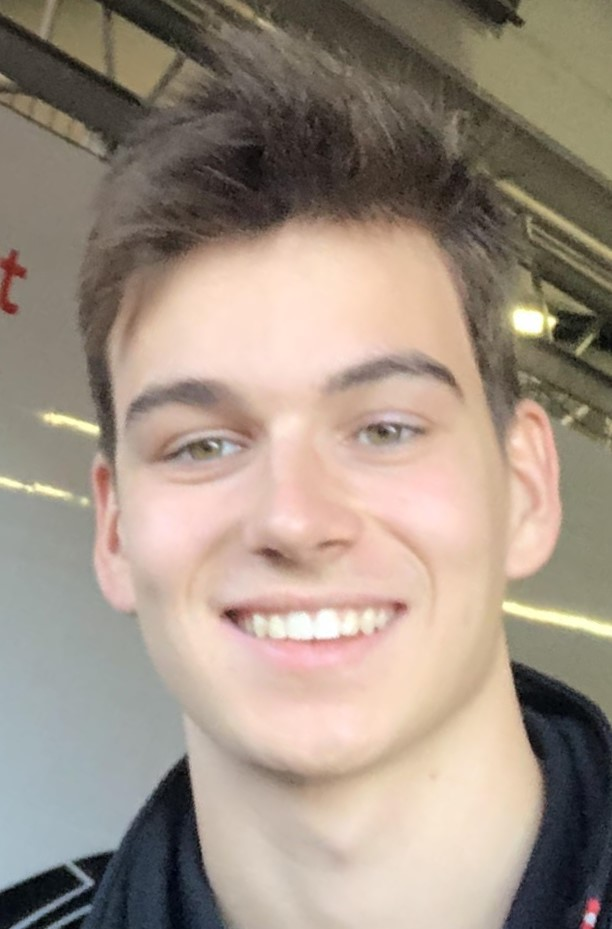
- Zug in 2022
- Nationality: (Germany) German
- Born: 6 February 2003 (age 23) Munich, Germany

Deutsche Tourenwagen Masters career
- Debut season: 2022
- Current team: Attempto Racing
- Categorisation: FIA Bronze (2019); FIA Silver (2020–2022, 2027–); FIA Gold (2023–2026)
- Car number: 66
- Starts: 16
- Wins: 0
- Podiums: 0
- Poles: 0
- Fastest laps: 0

Previous series
- 2021 2019–2021 2019 2019: European Le Mans Series; Italian GT Championship; GT4 European Series; ADAC GT4 Germany

Marius Zug (born 6 February 2003) is a German racing driver who currently competes in the GT World Challenge Europe Endurance Cup for Winward Racing.

== Career ==
=== Karting ===
Zug began karting in 2013. In 2017, he became Junior champion in the ADAC Kart Masters. In the fall of 2017, he tested Formula 4 cars but decided to stay in karting for 2018.

=== Sports car racing ===
In 2019, Zug made his debut in GT racing. He joined RN Vision STS in the GT4 European Series, driving a BMW M4 GT4. He won in the Pro-Am Cup in the first race of the season at Monza together with his teammate Gabriele Piana. This win was followed by a win at Misano, a win at Zandvoort and two wins at the Nürburgring. Zug and Piana became vice-champions of the Pro-Am Cup. Zug also became the Junior champion.

In addition to the GT4 European Series, the duo also drove in the ADAC GT4 Germany. They won the first race of the season at Oschersleben and the first race at Zandvoort. Zug and Piana became vice-champions once more.

In October 2019, Zug also completed his first race in a GT3 car. He competed in the final round of the Italian GT Championship for MRS GT Racing driving a BMW M6 GT3.

In 2020, Zug stayed in the Italian GT Championship driving for BMW Team Italia. At the sixth round at Monza, he claimed his first pole position and his first victory in the Italian GT Championship together with his teammate Stefano Comandini. For 2021 he stayed with the same team, which had rebranded to Ceccato Racing. For the Sprint races, he once again shared the car with Stefano Comabdini. For the Endurance races, the pair were joined by Bruno Spengler. His best finish of the season was a third place which he achieved came in the second sprint race at Imola.

In 2022, Zug would drive for Attempto Racing in Audi R8 LMS GT3 Evo II competing in both the Deutsche Tourenwagen Masters and the GT World Challenge Europe Endurance Cup. After finishing runner-up in the Silver Cup class, Zug changed teams for 2023. The new season saw him join Winward Racing, driving alongside Miklas Born and David Schumacher in the Gold Cup class.

== Personal life ==
Zug was born in Munich, Bavaria and currently resides in Pfaffenhofen an der Ilm. He lists Simracing, Golf, Tennis and Cooking as his hobbies and names Juan Manuel Fangio as a rolemodel. His younger sister Lilly is also a racing driver who competed in the Tourenwagen Junior Cup.

== Racing record ==
=== Career summary ===
| Season | Series | Team | Races | Wins | Poles | F/Laps | Podiums | Points | Position |
|---|---|---|---|---|---|---|---|---|---|
| 2019 | ADAC GT4 Germany | RN Vision STS | 12 | 2 | 0 | 0 | 4 | 143 | **2nd** |
| 2019 | GT4 European Series - Pro-Am | RN Vision STS | 11 | 5 | 3 | 4 | 9 | 199 | **2nd** |
| 2019 | Italian GT Sprint Championship - GT3-Am | MRS GT Racing | 2 | 1 | 1 | 0 | 2 | 35 | **2nd** |
| 2020 | Italian GT Endurance Championship - GT3 | BMW Team Italia | 4 | 0 | 1 | 0 | 2 | 34 | 5th |
| 2020 | Italian GT Sprint Championship - GT3 | BMW Team Italia | 8 | 1 | 0 | 0 | 3 | 60 | 6th |
| 2021 | European Le Mans Series - LMP3 | Inter Europol Competition | 1 | 0 | 0 | 0 | 0 | 6 | 30th |
| 2021 | Italian GT Endurance Championship - GT3 | Ceccato Racing | 4 | 0 | 1 | 0 | 0 | 11 | 12th |
| 2021 | Italian GT Sprint Championship - GT3 Pro | Ceccato Racing | 8 | 0 | 0 | 0 | 2 | 31 | 8th |
| 2022 | Deutsche Tourenwagen Masters | Attempto Racing | 16 | 0 | 0 | 0 | 0 | 13 | 21st |
| 2022 | GT World Challenge Europe Endurance Cup | Attempto Racing | 5 | 0 | 0 | 0 | 0 | 4 | 32nd |
| 2023 | GT World Challenge Europe Endurance Cup | Winward Racing | 5 | 0 | 0 | 0 | 0 | 9 | 17th |
| 2023 | GT World Challenge Europe Endurance Cup - Gold Cup | Winward Racing | 5 | 1 | 1 | 1 | 3 | 88 | **3rd** |

=== Complete Deutsche Tourenwagen Masters results ===
(key) (Races in bold indicate pole position) (Races in italics indicate fastest lap)

| Year | Entrant | Chassis | 1 | 2 | 3 | 4 | 5 | 6 | 7 | 8 | 9 | 10 | 11 | 12 | 13 | 14 | 15 | 16 | Rank | Points |
|---|---|---|---|---|---|---|---|---|---|---|---|---|---|---|---|---|---|---|---|---|
| 2022 | Attempto Racing | Audi R8 LMS Evo II | ALG; 1; 18 | ALG; 2; 16 | LAU; 1; 15 | LAU; 2 Ret | IMO; 1; 17 | IMO; 2 Ret | NOR; 1; 11 | NOR; 2 Ret | NÜR; 1; 14 | NÜR; 2; 12 | SPA; 1; 17 | SPA; 2; 16 | RBR; 1; 19 | RBR; 2; 19 | HOC; 1 Ret | HOC; 2; 4^{3} | 21st | 13 |

=== Complete GT World Challenge results ===
==== GT World Challenge Europe Endurance Cup ====
(Races in bold indicate pole position) (Races in italics indicate fastest lap)

| Year | Team | Car | Class | 1 | 2 | 3 | 4 | 5 | 6 | 7 | Pos. | Points |
|---|---|---|---|---|---|---|---|---|---|---|---|---|
| 2022 | Attempto Racing | Audi R8 LMS Evo II | Silver | **IMO**; 16 | LEC; 39 | SPA; 6H; 30 | SPA; 12H; 13 | SPA; 24H; 15 | HOC; 8 | CAT; 17 | 2nd | 76 |
| 2023 | Winward Racing | Mercedes-AMG GT3 Evo | Gold | MNZ; 26 | LEC; 10 | SPA; 6H; 22 | SPA; 12H; 58† | SPA; 24H; Ret | **NÜR**; 6 | CAT; 14 | 3rd | 88 |

^{*}Season still in progress.
