= 2023 GT World Challenge Europe Endurance Cup =

Motorsports event

The 2023 Fanatec GT World Challenge Europe Endurance Cup was the thirteenth season of the GT World Challenge Europe Endurance Cup since its inception in 2011 as the Blancpain Endurance Series. The season began on 22 April at Autodromo Nazionale Monza and ended on 1 October at Circuit de Barcelona-Catalunya.

== Calendar ==
The provisional calendar was released on 29 July 2022 at the SRO's annual 24 Hours of Spa press conference, featuring five rounds. In a change from the 2022 schedule, the opening round at Imola was moved back to Monza. The calendar was further adjusted to alleviate a conflict between the Belgian Grand Prix and the 24 Hours of Spa. The 24-hour event was moved forward to the weekend of 1–2 July, while the Monza round was moved forward one week, and Nürburgring returned to the calendar.

Round	Race	Circuit	Date
1	3 Hours of Monza	Autodromo Nazionale Monza, Monza, Italy	22–23 April
2	Circuit Paul Ricard 1000 km	Circuit Paul Ricard, Le Castellet, France	3–4 June
3	CrowdStrike 24 Hours of Spa	Circuit de Spa-Francorchamps, Stavelot, Belgium	29 June–2 July
4	3 Hours of Nürburgring	Nürburgring, Nürburg, Germany	29–30 July
5	3 Hours of Barcelona	Circuit de Barcelona-Catalunya, Montmeló, Spain	30 September–1 October

== Entry list ==
Team	Car	No.	Drivers	Class	Rounds
(Germany) GetSpeed	Mercedes-AMG GT3 Evo	2	(Poland) Andrzej Lewandowski	PA	All
(Germany) GetSpeed	Mercedes-AMG GT3 Evo	2	(United Kingdom) Aaron Walker	PA	All
(Germany) GetSpeed	Mercedes-AMG GT3 Evo	2	(United States) Lance Bergstein	PA	1–4
(Germany) GetSpeed	Mercedes-AMG GT3 Evo	2	(United Kingdom) Lewis Williamson	PA	3
(Germany) GetSpeed	Mercedes-AMG GT3 Evo	2	(Germany) Adam Osieka	PA	5
(Germany) GetSpeed	Mercedes-AMG GT3 Evo	3	(Germany) Patrick Assenheimer	B	All
(Germany) GetSpeed	Mercedes-AMG GT3 Evo	3	(Germany) Florian Scholze	B	All
(Germany) GetSpeed	Mercedes-AMG GT3 Evo	3	(Australia) Alex Peroni	B	1–4
(Germany) GetSpeed	Mercedes-AMG GT3 Evo	3	(Germany) Kenneth Heyer	B	3
(Germany) GetSpeed	Mercedes-AMG GT3 Evo	3	(Austria) Lucas Auer	B	5
(Oman) Mercedes-AMG Team AlManar	Mercedes-AMG GT3 Evo	777	(Germany) Fabian Schiller	P	All
(Oman) Mercedes-AMG Team AlManar	Mercedes-AMG GT3 Evo	777	(Germany) Luca Stolz	P	All
(Oman) Mercedes-AMG Team AlManar	Mercedes-AMG GT3 Evo	777	(Germany) Maro Engel	P	1–2, 4–5
(Oman) Mercedes-AMG Team AlManar	Mercedes-AMG GT3 Evo	777	(Austria) Lucas Auer	P	3
(United States) CrowdStrike Racing by Riley	Mercedes-AMG GT3 Evo	4	(United States) Colin Braun	PA	3
(United States) CrowdStrike Racing by Riley	Mercedes-AMG GT3 Evo	4	(Brazil) Felipe Fraga	PA	3
(United States) CrowdStrike Racing by Riley	Mercedes-AMG GT3 Evo	4	(United Kingdom) Ian James	PA	3
(United States) CrowdStrike Racing by Riley	Mercedes-AMG GT3 Evo	4	(United States) George Kurtz	PA	3
(United Kingdom) Optimum Motorsport	McLaren 720S GT3 Evo	5	(United Kingdom) Sam De Haan	G	All
(United Kingdom) Optimum Motorsport	McLaren 720S GT3 Evo	5	(United Kingdom) Charlie Fagg	G	All
(United Kingdom) Optimum Motorsport	McLaren 720S GT3 Evo	5	(United Kingdom) Dean MacDonald	G	All
(United Kingdom) Optimum Motorsport	McLaren 720S GT3 Evo	5	(United Kingdom) Tom Gamble	G	3
(United Kingdom) Inception Racing	McLaren 720S GT3 Evo	7	(United States) Brendan Iribe	B	3
(United Kingdom) Inception Racing	McLaren 720S GT3 Evo	7	(United Kingdom) Ollie Millroy	B	3
(United Kingdom) Inception Racing	McLaren 720S GT3 Evo	7	(Spain) Fran Rueda	B	3
(United Kingdom) Inception Racing	McLaren 720S GT3 Evo	7	(Denmark) Frederik Schandorff	B	3
(United States) K-PAX Racing	Lamborghini Huracán GT3 Evo 2	6	(Italy) Marco Mapelli	P	All
(United States) K-PAX Racing	Lamborghini Huracán GT3 Evo 2	6	(United Kingdom) Sandy Mitchell	P	All
(United States) K-PAX Racing	Lamborghini Huracán GT3 Evo 2	6	(France) Franck Perera	P	All
(France) AGS Events	Lamborghini Huracán GT3 Evo 2	8	(Switzerland) Antonin Borga	B	1–4
(France) AGS Events	Lamborghini Huracán GT3 Evo 2	8	(Italy) Leonardo Gorini	B	1–4
(France) AGS Events	Lamborghini Huracán GT3 Evo 2	8	(France) Nico Jamin	B	1–4
(Belgium) Boutsen VDS	Audi R8 LMS Evo II	9	(Italy) Alberto Di Folco	G	All
(Belgium) Boutsen VDS	Audi R8 LMS Evo II	9	(France) Adam Eteki	G	All
(Belgium) Boutsen VDS	Audi R8 LMS Evo II	9	(France) Aurélien Panis	G	All
(Belgium) Boutsen VDS	Audi R8 LMS Evo II	9	(France) Thomas Laurent	G	3
(Belgium) Boutsen VDS	Audi R8 LMS Evo II	10	(Italy) Andrea Cola	S	All
(Belgium) Boutsen VDS	Audi R8 LMS Evo II	10	(France) César Gazeau	S	All
(Belgium) Boutsen VDS	Audi R8 LMS Evo II	10	(United States) Roee Meyuhas	S	All
(Belgium) Boutsen VDS	Audi R8 LMS Evo II	10	(France) Loris Cabirou	S	3
(Belgium) / Audi Sport Team Comtoyou (Note: Car No. 11 entered as Comtoyou Racing at rounds 1–2 and 4–5, and as Audi Sport Team Comtoyou at round 3. Cars No. 12 and No. 21 entered as Comtoyou Racing at all rounds.); (Belgium) / Comtoyou Racing	Audi R8 LMS Evo II	11	(Germany) Christopher Haase	P	All
(Belgium) / Audi Sport Team Comtoyou; (Belgium) / Comtoyou Racing	Audi R8 LMS Evo II	11	(Belgium) Frédéric Vervisch	P	All
(Belgium) / Audi Sport Team Comtoyou; (Belgium) / Comtoyou Racing	Audi R8 LMS Evo II	11	(Belgium) Gilles Magnus	P	1–3, 5
(Belgium) / Audi Sport Team Comtoyou; (Belgium) / Comtoyou Racing	Audi R8 LMS Evo II	11	(Belgium) Kobe Pauwels	P	4
(Belgium) / Audi Sport Team Comtoyou; (Belgium) / Comtoyou Racing	Audi R8 LMS Evo II	12	(Belgium) Sam Dejonghe	S	All
(Belgium) / Audi Sport Team Comtoyou; (Belgium) / Comtoyou Racing	Audi R8 LMS Evo II	12	(Netherlands) Loris Hezemans	S	All
(Belgium) / Audi Sport Team Comtoyou; (Belgium) / Comtoyou Racing	Audi R8 LMS Evo II	12	(United Kingdom) Finlay Hutchison	S	All
(Belgium) / Audi Sport Team Comtoyou; (Belgium) / Comtoyou Racing	Audi R8 LMS Evo II	12	(Switzerland) Lucas Légeret	S	3
(Belgium) / Audi Sport Team Comtoyou; (Belgium) / Comtoyou Racing	Audi R8 LMS Evo II	21	(Belgium) Nicolas Baert	G	All
(Belgium) / Audi Sport Team Comtoyou; (Belgium) / Comtoyou Racing	Audi R8 LMS Evo II	21	(Belgium) Maxime Soulet	G	All
(Belgium) / Audi Sport Team Comtoyou; (Belgium) / Comtoyou Racing	Audi R8 LMS Evo II	21	(Austria) Max Hofer	G	1–3, 5
(Belgium) / Audi Sport Team Comtoyou; (Belgium) / Comtoyou Racing	Audi R8 LMS Evo II	21	(Belgium) Gilles Magnus	G	4
(Italy) BMW Italia Ceccato Racing	BMW M4 GT3	15	(Italy) Marco Cassarà	PA	1
(Italy) BMW Italia Ceccato Racing	BMW M4 GT3	15	(Italy) Stefano Comandini	PA	1
(Italy) BMW Italia Ceccato Racing	BMW M4 GT3	15	(Italy) Francesco Guerra	PA	1
(China) Uno Racing Team	Audi R8 LMS Evo II	16	(Hong Kong) Adderly Fong	PA	3
(China) Uno Racing Team	Audi R8 LMS Evo II	16	(China) Xiaole He	PA	3
(China) Uno Racing Team	Audi R8 LMS Evo II	16	(China) Junlin Pan	PA	3
(China) Uno Racing Team	Audi R8 LMS Evo II	16	(Hong Kong) "Rio"	PA	3
(Germany) Scherer Sport PHX	Audi R8 LMS Evo II	17	(Germany) Luca Engstler	P	3
(Germany) Scherer Sport PHX	Audi R8 LMS Evo II	17	(South Africa) Kelvin van der Linde	P	3
(Germany) Scherer Sport PHX	Audi R8 LMS Evo II	17	(Denmark) Nicki Thiim	P	3
(Italy) Iron Lynx	Lamborghini Huracán GT3 Evo 2	19	(Italy) Michele Beretta	G	All
(Italy) Iron Lynx	Lamborghini Huracán GT3 Evo 2	19	(Italy) Leonardo Pulcini	G	All
(Italy) Iron Lynx	Lamborghini Huracán GT3 Evo 2	19	(Switzerland) Rolf Ineichen	G	1–4
(Italy) Iron Lynx	Lamborghini Huracán GT3 Evo 2	19	(France) Pierre-Louis Chovet	G	5
(Italy) Iron Lynx	Lamborghini Huracán GT3 Evo 2	63	(Italy) Mirko Bortolotti	P	All
(Italy) Iron Lynx	Lamborghini Huracán GT3 Evo 2	63	(Italy) Andrea Caldarelli	P	All
(Italy) Iron Lynx	Lamborghini Huracán GT3 Evo 2	63	(South Africa) Jordan Pepper	P	All
(Italy) Iron Dames	Lamborghini Huracán GT3 Evo 2	83	(Belgium) Sarah Bovy	B	All
(Italy) Iron Dames	Lamborghini Huracán GT3 Evo 2	83	(Switzerland) Rahel Frey	B	All
(Italy) Iron Dames	Lamborghini Huracán GT3 Evo 2	83	(Denmark) Michelle Gatting	B	All
(Italy) Iron Dames	Lamborghini Huracán GT3 Evo 2	83	(France) Doriane Pin	B	3
(Germany) Huber Motorsport	Porsche 911 GT3 R (992)	20	(Hong Kong) Antares Au	B	3
(Germany) Huber Motorsport	Porsche 911 GT3 R (992)	20	(Italy) Matteo Cairoli	B	3
(Germany) Huber Motorsport	Porsche 911 GT3 R (992)	20	(Germany) Jannes Fittje	B	3
(Germany) Huber Motorsport	Porsche 911 GT3 R (992)	20	(Germany) Tim Heinemann	B	3
(France) CLRT	Porsche 911 GT3 R (992)	22	(France) Dorian Boccolacci	PA	2
(France) CLRT	Porsche 911 GT3 R (992)	22	(France) Emil Caumes	PA	2
(France) CLRT	Porsche 911 GT3 R (992)	22	(France) Stéphane Denoual	PA	2
(France) CLRT	Porsche 911 GT3 R (992)	44	(France) Clément Mateu	B	All
(France) CLRT	Porsche 911 GT3 R (992)	44	(France) Steven Palette	B	All
(France) CLRT	Porsche 911 GT3 R (992)	44	(France) Hugo Chevalier	B	1–3
(France) CLRT	Porsche 911 GT3 R (992)	44	(France) Frédéric Makowiecki	B	3–5
(Australia) Grove Racing	Porsche 911 GT3 R (992)	23	(New Zealand) Earl Bamber	B	3
(Australia) Grove Racing	Porsche 911 GT3 R (992)	23	(Australia) Brenton Grove	B	3
(Australia) Grove Racing	Porsche 911 GT3 R (992)	23	(Australia) Stephen Grove	B	3
(Australia) Grove Racing	Porsche 911 GT3 R (992)	23	(Australia) Anton de Pasquale	B	3
(Germany) Car Collection Motorsport	Porsche 911 GT3 R (992)	24	(Switzerland) Alex Fontana	PA	All
(Germany) Car Collection Motorsport	Porsche 911 GT3 R (992)	24	(Switzerland) Ivan Jacoma	PA	All
(Germany) Car Collection Motorsport	Porsche 911 GT3 R (992)	24	(Switzerland) Nicolas Leutwiler	PA	All
(Germany) Car Collection Motorsport	Porsche 911 GT3 R (992)	24	(Germany) Nico Menzel	PA	3
(United States) GMG Racing by Car Collection Motorsport	Porsche 911 GT3 R (992)	132	(Netherlands) Jeroen Bleekemolen	PA	3
(United States) GMG Racing by Car Collection Motorsport	Porsche 911 GT3 R (992)	132	(United States) Patrick Long	PA	3
(United States) GMG Racing by Car Collection Motorsport	Porsche 911 GT3 R (992)	132	(United States) James Sofronas	PA	3
(United States) GMG Racing by Car Collection Motorsport	Porsche 911 GT3 R (992)	132	(United States) Kyle Washington	PA	3
(France) / Audi Sport Team Saintéloc (Note: Car No. 25 entered as Saintéloc Junior Team at rounds 1–2 and 4–5, and as Audi Sport Team Saintéloc at round 3. Car No. 26 entered as Saintéloc Junior Team at all rounds.); (France) / Saintéloc Junior Team	Audi R8 LMS Evo II	25	(France) Simon Gachet	P	All
(France) / Audi Sport Team Saintéloc; (France) / Saintéloc Junior Team	Audi R8 LMS Evo II	25	(Germany) Christopher Mies	P	All
(France) / Audi Sport Team Saintéloc; (France) / Saintéloc Junior Team	Audi R8 LMS Evo II	25	(Switzerland) Patric Niederhauser	P	All
(France) / Audi Sport Team Saintéloc; (France) / Saintéloc Junior Team	Audi R8 LMS Evo II	26	(France) Erwan Bastard	S	All
(France) / Audi Sport Team Saintéloc; (France) / Saintéloc Junior Team	Audi R8 LMS Evo II	26	(France) Grégoire Demoustier	S	All
(France) / Audi Sport Team Saintéloc; (France) / Saintéloc Junior Team	Audi R8 LMS Evo II	26	(France) Paul Evrard	S	All
(France) / Audi Sport Team Saintéloc; (France) / Saintéloc Junior Team	Audi R8 LMS Evo II	26	(France) Antoine Doquin	S	3
(Belgium) Team WRT	BMW M4 GT3	30	(Germany) Niklas Krütten	G	All
(Belgium) Team WRT	BMW M4 GT3	30	(France) Jean-Baptiste Simmenauer	G	All
(Belgium) Team WRT	BMW M4 GT3	30	(Australia) Calan Williams	G	All
(Belgium) Team WRT	BMW M4 GT3	31	(United Kingdom) Lewis Proctor	B	1–2, 4–5
(Belgium) Team WRT	BMW M4 GT3	31	(United Kingdom) Tim Whale	B	1–2, 5
(Belgium) Team WRT	BMW M4 GT3	31	(United Kingdom) Adam Carroll	B	1–2
(Belgium) Team WRT	BMW M4 GT3	31	(Germany) Jens Klingmann	B	4
(Belgium) Team WRT	BMW M4 GT3	31	(United Kingdom) Darren Leung	B	4
(Belgium) Team WRT	BMW M4 GT3	31	(Finland) Jesse Krohn	B	5
(Belgium) Team WRT	BMW M4 GT3	31	(United Kingdom) Adam Carroll	P (Note: The No. 31 Team WRT car initially entered the 24 Hours of Spa in Bronze Cup, but it was reclassified as Pro during the race after Tim Whale withdrew due to back pain.)	3
(Belgium) Team WRT	BMW M4 GT3	31	(United Kingdom) Lewis Proctor	P	3
(Belgium) Team WRT	BMW M4 GT3	31	(United Kingdom) Tim Whale	P	3
(Belgium) Team WRT	BMW M4 GT3	32	(South Africa) Sheldon van der Linde	P	All
(Belgium) Team WRT	BMW M4 GT3	32	(Belgium) Dries Vanthoor	P	All
(Belgium) Team WRT	BMW M4 GT3	32	(Belgium) Charles Weerts	P	All
(Belgium) Team WRT	BMW M4 GT3	46	(Brazil) Augusto Farfus	P	All
(Belgium) Team WRT	BMW M4 GT3	46	(Belgium) Maxime Martin	P	All
(Belgium) Team WRT	BMW M4 GT3	46	(Italy) Valentino Rossi	P	All
(Spain) Bullitt Racing	Aston Martin Vantage AMR GT3	33	(France) Romain Leroux	S	All
(Spain) Bullitt Racing	Aston Martin Vantage AMR GT3	33	(Germany) Jacob Riegel	S	All
(Spain) Bullitt Racing	Aston Martin Vantage AMR GT3	33	(Canada) Jeff Kingsley	S	1–4
(Spain) Bullitt Racing	Aston Martin Vantage AMR GT3	33	(Netherlands) Ruben del Sarte	S	3
(Spain) Bullitt Racing	Aston Martin Vantage AMR GT3	33	(France) Maxime Robin	S	5
(Germany) Walkenhorst Motorsport	BMW M4 GT3	35	(Norway) Anders Buchardt	B	All
(Germany) Walkenhorst Motorsport	BMW M4 GT3	35	(United Kingdom) James Kell	B	All
(Germany) Walkenhorst Motorsport	BMW M4 GT3	35	(France) Thomas Neubauer	B	1–4
(Germany) Walkenhorst Motorsport	BMW M4 GT3	35	(United Kingdom) Bailey Voisin	B	3
(Germany) Walkenhorst Motorsport	BMW M4 GT3	35	(United Kingdom) Ben Green	B	5
(Germany) ST Racing with Rinaldi	Ferrari 488 GT3 Evo 2020 1–2; Ferrari 296 GT3 3–5	38	(Canada) Samantha Tan	PA	All
(Germany) ST Racing with Rinaldi	Ferrari 488 GT3 Evo 2020 1–2; Ferrari 296 GT3 3–5	38	(Spain) Isaac Tutumlu	PA	All
(Germany) ST Racing with Rinaldi	Ferrari 488 GT3 Evo 2020 1–2; Ferrari 296 GT3 3–5	38	(United States) Jon Miller	PA	1–4
(Germany) ST Racing with Rinaldi	Ferrari 488 GT3 Evo 2020 1–2; Ferrari 296 GT3 3–5	38	(Germany) Leonard Weiss	PA	3
(Germany) ST Racing with Rinaldi	Ferrari 488 GT3 Evo 2020 1–2; Ferrari 296 GT3 3–5	38	(United Kingdom) Lorcan Hanafin	PA	5
(Germany) / Audi Sport Tresor Orange1 (Note: Car No. 40 entered as Tresor Orange1 at rounds 1–2 and 4–5, and as Audi Sport Tresor Orange1 at round 3. Car No. 66 entered as Tresor Attempto Racing at all rounds. Car No. 99 entered as Tresor Attempto Racing at rounds 1–2 and 4–5, and as Tresor Orange1 at round 3.); (Germany) / Tresor Orange1; (Germany) / Tresor Attempto Racing	Audi R8 LMS Evo II	40	(San Marino) Mattia Drudi (Note: Drudi is an Italian driver competing under a Sammarinese licence.)	P	All
(Germany) / Audi Sport Tresor Orange1; (Germany) / Tresor Orange1; (Germany) / Tresor Attempto Racing	Audi R8 LMS Evo II	40	(Switzerland) Ricardo Feller	P	All
(Germany) / Audi Sport Tresor Orange1; (Germany) / Tresor Orange1; (Germany) / Tresor Attempto Racing	Audi R8 LMS Evo II	40	(Germany) Dennis Marschall	P	All
(Germany) / Audi Sport Tresor Orange1; (Germany) / Tresor Orange1; (Germany) / Tresor Attempto Racing	Audi R8 LMS Evo II	66	Andrey Mukovoz (Note: Boguslavskiy, Mukovoz and Nesov are Russian, but they compete as neutral competitors as Russian national emblems were banned by the FIA following the Russian invasion of Ukraine. Shwartzman and Petrov, also Russians, compete under an Israeli licence for the same reason.)	B	All
(Germany) / Audi Sport Tresor Orange1; (Germany) / Tresor Orange1; (Germany) / Tresor Attempto Racing	Audi R8 LMS Evo II	66	(Luxembourg) Dylan Pereira	B	All
(Germany) / Audi Sport Tresor Orange1; (Germany) / Tresor Orange1; (Germany) / Tresor Attempto Racing	Audi R8 LMS Evo II	66	(Italy) Kikko Galbiati	B	1–4
(Germany) / Audi Sport Tresor Orange1; (Germany) / Tresor Orange1; (Germany) / Tresor Attempto Racing	Audi R8 LMS Evo II	66	(Singapore) Sean Hudspeth	B	3
(Germany) / Audi Sport Tresor Orange1; (Germany) / Tresor Orange1; (Germany) / Tresor Attempto Racing	Audi R8 LMS Evo II	66	(Austria) Christopher Zöchling	B	5
(Germany) / Audi Sport Tresor Orange1; (Germany) / Tresor Orange1; (Germany) / Tresor Attempto Racing	Audi R8 LMS Evo II	99	(Germany) Alex Aka	S	All
(Germany) / Audi Sport Tresor Orange1; (Germany) / Tresor Orange1; (Germany) / Tresor Attempto Racing	Audi R8 LMS Evo II	99	(Italy) Pietro Delli Guanti	S	All
(Germany) / Audi Sport Tresor Orange1; (Germany) / Tresor Orange1; (Germany) / Tresor Attempto Racing	Audi R8 LMS Evo II	99	(Italy) Lorenzo Patrese	S	All
(Italy) / AF Corse (Note: Cars No. 50, No. 52 and No. 53 entered as AF Corse. Cars No. 51 and No. 71 entered as AF Corse - Francorchamps Motors.); (Italy) / AF Corse - Francorchamps Motors	Ferrari 296 GT3	50	(United Kingdom) Simon Mann	B	3
(Italy) / AF Corse; (Italy) / AF Corse - Francorchamps Motors	Ferrari 296 GT3	50	(Belgium) Ulysse de Pauw	B	3
(Italy) / AF Corse; (Italy) / AF Corse - Francorchamps Motors	Ferrari 296 GT3	50	(France) Julien Piguet	B	3
(Italy) / AF Corse; (Italy) / AF Corse - Francorchamps Motors	Ferrari 296 GT3	50	(Argentina) Nicolás Varrone	B	3
(Italy) / AF Corse; (Italy) / AF Corse - Francorchamps Motors	Ferrari 296 GT3	51	(Denmark) Nicklas Nielsen	P	All
(Italy) / AF Corse; (Italy) / AF Corse - Francorchamps Motors	Ferrari 296 GT3	51	(Italy) Alessio Rovera	P	All
(Italy) / AF Corse; (Italy) / AF Corse - Francorchamps Motors	Ferrari 296 GT3	51	(Israel) Robert Shwartzman	P	All
(Italy) / AF Corse; (Italy) / AF Corse - Francorchamps Motors	Ferrari 296 GT3	53	(United States) Manny Franco	S	5
(Italy) / AF Corse; (Italy) / AF Corse - Francorchamps Motors	Ferrari 296 GT3	53	(Monaco) Cédric Sbirrazzuoli	S	5
(Italy) / AF Corse; (Italy) / AF Corse - Francorchamps Motors	Ferrari 296 GT3	53	(France) Lilou Wadoux	S	5
(Italy) / AF Corse; (Italy) / AF Corse - Francorchamps Motors	Ferrari 296 GT3	71	(Italy) Antonio Fuoco	P	All
(Italy) / AF Corse; (Italy) / AF Corse - Francorchamps Motors	Ferrari 296 GT3	71	(Italy) Davide Rigon	P	All
(Italy) / AF Corse; (Italy) / AF Corse - Francorchamps Motors	Ferrari 296 GT3	71	(Italy) Alessandro Pier Guidi	P	1
(Italy) / AF Corse; (Italy) / AF Corse - Francorchamps Motors	Ferrari 296 GT3	71	(Brazil) Daniel Serra	P	2–5
(Italy) / AF Corse; (Italy) / AF Corse - Francorchamps Motors	Ferrari 488 GT3 Evo 2020 1–3; Ferrari 296 GT3 4–5	52	(Italy) Andrea Bertolini	B	All
(Italy) / AF Corse; (Italy) / AF Corse - Francorchamps Motors	Ferrari 488 GT3 Evo 2020 1–3; Ferrari 296 GT3 4–5	52	(Belgium) Jef Machiels	B	All
(Italy) / AF Corse; (Italy) / AF Corse - Francorchamps Motors	Ferrari 488 GT3 Evo 2020 1–3; Ferrari 296 GT3 4–5	52	(Belgium) Louis Machiels	B	All
(Italy) / AF Corse; (Italy) / AF Corse - Francorchamps Motors	Ferrari 488 GT3 Evo 2020 1–3; Ferrari 296 GT3 4–5	52	(France) Lilou Wadoux	B	3
(Italy) / Dinamic GT Huber Racing (Note: Cars No. 54 and No. 55 entered as Dinamic GT Huber Racing at rounds 1–3, and as Dinamic GT at rounds 4–5. Car No. 56 entered as Dinamic GT Huber Racing at rounds 1–3, and as Dinamic GT with Car Collection at rounds 4–5.); (Italy) / Dinamic GT; (Italy) / Dinamic GT with Car Collection	Porsche 911 GT3 R (992)	54	(Germany) Christian Engelhart	P	All
(Italy) / Dinamic GT Huber Racing; (Italy) / Dinamic GT; (Italy) / Dinamic GT with Car Collection	Porsche 911 GT3 R (992)	54	(Turkey) Ayhancan Güven	P	All
(Italy) / Dinamic GT Huber Racing; (Italy) / Dinamic GT; (Italy) / Dinamic GT with Car Collection	Porsche 911 GT3 R (992)	54	(Germany) Sven Müller	P	All
(Italy) / Dinamic GT Huber Racing; (Italy) / Dinamic GT; (Italy) / Dinamic GT with Car Collection	Porsche 911 GT3 R (992)	55	(United Kingdom) Ben Barker	B	All
(Italy) / Dinamic GT Huber Racing; (Italy) / Dinamic GT; (Italy) / Dinamic GT with Car Collection	Porsche 911 GT3 R (992)	55	(Norway) Marius Nakken	B	All
(Italy) / Dinamic GT Huber Racing; (Italy) / Dinamic GT; (Italy) / Dinamic GT with Car Collection	Porsche 911 GT3 R (992)	55	(Austria) Philipp Sager	B	All
(Italy) / Dinamic GT Huber Racing; (Italy) / Dinamic GT; (Italy) / Dinamic GT with Car Collection	Porsche 911 GT3 R (992)	55	(Austria) Christopher Zöchling	B	3
(Italy) / Dinamic GT Huber Racing; (Italy) / Dinamic GT; (Italy) / Dinamic GT with Car Collection	Porsche 911 GT3 R (992) 1, 3–5; Porsche 911 GT3 R (991) 2	56	(Italy) Daniele Di Amato	S	All
(Italy) / Dinamic GT Huber Racing; (Italy) / Dinamic GT; (Italy) / Dinamic GT with Car Collection	Porsche 911 GT3 R (992) 1, 3–5; Porsche 911 GT3 R (991) 2	56	(Netherlands) Jop Rappange	S	All
(Italy) / Dinamic GT Huber Racing; (Italy) / Dinamic GT; (Italy) / Dinamic GT with Car Collection	Porsche 911 GT3 R (992) 1, 3–5; Porsche 911 GT3 R (991) 2	56	(Thailand) Tanart Sathienthirakul	S	All
(Italy) / Dinamic GT Huber Racing; (Italy) / Dinamic GT; (Italy) / Dinamic GT with Car Collection	Porsche 911 GT3 R (992) 1, 3–5; Porsche 911 GT3 R (991) 2	56	(Belgium) Adrien de Leener	S	3
(United States) Winward Racing	Mercedes-AMG GT3 Evo	57	(Netherlands) Indy Dontje	G	All
(United States) Winward Racing	Mercedes-AMG GT3 Evo	57	(Switzerland) Philip Ellis	G	All
(United States) Winward Racing	Mercedes-AMG GT3 Evo	57	(United States) Russell Ward	G	All
(United States) Winward Racing	Mercedes-AMG GT3 Evo	157	(Switzerland) Miklas Born	G	All
(United States) Winward Racing	Mercedes-AMG GT3 Evo	157	(Germany) David Schumacher	G	All
(United States) Winward Racing	Mercedes-AMG GT3 Evo	157	(Germany) Marius Zug	G	All
(Austria) GRT Grasser Racing Team	Lamborghini Huracán GT3 Evo 2	58	(Italy) Fabrizio Crestani	S	All
(Austria) GRT Grasser Racing Team	Lamborghini Huracán GT3 Evo 2	58	(United Kingdom) Sam Neary	S	All
(Austria) GRT Grasser Racing Team	Lamborghini Huracán GT3 Evo 2	58	(Australia) Ricky Capo	S	1–3
(Austria) GRT Grasser Racing Team	Lamborghini Huracán GT3 Evo 2	58	(Austria) Gerhard Tweraser	S	3–5
(Austria) GRT Grasser Racing Team	Lamborghini Huracán GT3 Evo 2	85	(Chile) Benjamín Hites	S	All
(Austria) GRT Grasser Racing Team	Lamborghini Huracán GT3 Evo 2	85	(Austria) Clemens Schmid	S	All
(Austria) GRT Grasser Racing Team	Lamborghini Huracán GT3 Evo 2	85	(Netherlands) Kay van Berlo	S	1
(Austria) GRT Grasser Racing Team	Lamborghini Huracán GT3 Evo 2	85	(Netherlands) Glenn van Berlo	S	2–5
(Italy) VSR	Lamborghini Huracán GT3 Evo 2	60	(Mexico) Luis Michael Dörrbecker	S	3
(Italy) VSR	Lamborghini Huracán GT3 Evo 2	60	(Belgium) Baptiste Moulin	S	3
(Italy) VSR	Lamborghini Huracán GT3 Evo 2	60	(Norway) Marcus Påverud	S	3
(Italy) VSR	Lamborghini Huracán GT3 Evo 2	60	(Israel) Artem Petrov	S	3
(United Kingdom) Team Parker Racing	Porsche 911 GT3 R (992)	62	(United Kingdom) Kiern Jewiss	B	1–4
(United Kingdom) Team Parker Racing	Porsche 911 GT3 R (992)	62	(United Kingdom) Derek Pierce	B	1–4
(United Kingdom) Team Parker Racing	Porsche 911 GT3 R (992)	62	(New Zealand) Jaxon Evans	B	1
(United Kingdom) Team Parker Racing	Porsche 911 GT3 R (992)	62	(United Kingdom) Andy Meyrick	B	2–4
(United Kingdom) Team Parker Racing	Porsche 911 GT3 R (992)	62	(Netherlands) Xavier Maassen	B	3
(Germany) Haupt Racing Team	Mercedes-AMG GT3 Evo	64	(United Kingdom) Matt Bell	PA	3
(Germany) Haupt Racing Team	Mercedes-AMG GT3 Evo	64	(United Kingdom) Frank Bird	PA	3
(Germany) Haupt Racing Team	Mercedes-AMG GT3 Evo	64	(United Kingdom) James Cottingham	PA	3
(Germany) Haupt Racing Team	Mercedes-AMG GT3 Evo	64	(United States) Naveen Rao	PA	3
(Germany) Haupt Racing Team	Mercedes-AMG GT3 Evo	79	(France) Sébastien Baud	B	All
(Germany) Haupt Racing Team	Mercedes-AMG GT3 Evo	79	(Germany) Hubert Haupt	B	All
(Germany) Haupt Racing Team	Mercedes-AMG GT3 Evo	79	(India) Arjun Maini	B	All
(Germany) Haupt Racing Team	Mercedes-AMG GT3 Evo	79	(Australia) Jordan Love	B	3
(United States) SunEnergy1 Racing	Mercedes-AMG GT3 Evo	75	(Netherlands) Nicky Catsburg	PA	3 (Note: Kenny Habul withdrew from the 24 Hours of Spa following an accident in Thursday's pre-qualifying session. Liam Talbot was originally nominated as his replacement, but could not make it to Belgium in time. The seat was eventually taken by GetSpeed owner Adam Osieka.)
(United States) SunEnergy1 Racing	Mercedes-AMG GT3 Evo	75	(Australia) Kenny Habul	PA	3
(United States) SunEnergy1 Racing	Mercedes-AMG GT3 Evo	75	(Austria) Martin Konrad	PA	3
(United States) SunEnergy1 Racing	Mercedes-AMG GT3 Evo	75	(Australia) Chaz Mostert	PA	3
(United States) SunEnergy1 Racing	Mercedes-AMG GT3 Evo	75	(Germany) Adam Osieka	PA	3
(Germany) / Leipert Motorsport (Note: Car No. 70 entered as Leipert Motorsport at round 2, and as CrowdStrike Racing by Leipert Motorsport at round 3.); (Germany) / CrowdStrike Racing by Leipert Motorsport	Lamborghini Huracán GT3 Evo 2 Lamborghini Huracán GT3 Evo 2 3	70	(United States) Jean-Francois Brunot	S	2
(Germany) / Leipert Motorsport; (Germany) / CrowdStrike Racing by Leipert Motorsport	Lamborghini Huracán GT3 Evo 2 Lamborghini Huracán GT3 Evo 2 3	70	(New Zealand) Brendon Leitch	S	2
(Germany) / Leipert Motorsport; (Germany) / CrowdStrike Racing by Leipert Motorsport	Lamborghini Huracán GT3 Evo 2 Lamborghini Huracán GT3 Evo 2 3	70	(China) Kerong Li	S	2
(Germany) / Leipert Motorsport; (Germany) / CrowdStrike Racing by Leipert Motorsport	Lamborghini Huracán GT3 Evo 2 Lamborghini Huracán GT3 Evo 2 3	70	(United States) Jean-Francois Brunot	PA	3
(Germany) / Leipert Motorsport; (Germany) / CrowdStrike Racing by Leipert Motorsport	Lamborghini Huracán GT3 Evo 2 Lamborghini Huracán GT3 Evo 2 3	70	(New Zealand) Brendon Leitch	PA	3
(Germany) / Leipert Motorsport; (Germany) / CrowdStrike Racing by Leipert Motorsport	Lamborghini Huracán GT3 Evo 2 Lamborghini Huracán GT3 Evo 2 3	70	(China) Kerong Li	PA	3
(Germany) / Leipert Motorsport; (Germany) / CrowdStrike Racing by Leipert Motorsport	Lamborghini Huracán GT3 Evo 2 Lamborghini Huracán GT3 Evo 2 3	70	(United States) Gerhard Watzinger	PA	3
(United Kingdom) Barwell Motorsport	Lamborghini Huracán GT3 Evo 2	78	(United Kingdom) Rob Collard	PA	All
(United Kingdom) Barwell Motorsport	Lamborghini Huracán GT3 Evo 2	78	(Denmark) Dennis Lind	PA	All
(United Kingdom) Barwell Motorsport	Lamborghini Huracán GT3 Evo 2	78	(United Kingdom) Adam Balon	PA	1–2, 5
(United Kingdom) Barwell Motorsport	Lamborghini Huracán GT3 Evo 2	78	(Finland) Patrick Kujala	PA	3
(United Kingdom) Barwell Motorsport	Lamborghini Huracán GT3 Evo 2	78	(United Arab Emirates) Bashar Mardini	PA	3
(Saudi Arabia) Theeba Motorsport	Mercedes-AMG GT3 Evo	81	(Estonia) Ralf Aron	B	All
(Saudi Arabia) Theeba Motorsport	Mercedes-AMG GT3 Evo	81	(Saudi Arabia) Reema Juffali	B	All
(Saudi Arabia) Theeba Motorsport	Mercedes-AMG GT3 Evo	81	(Switzerland) Alain Valente	B	All
(Saudi Arabia) Theeba Motorsport	Mercedes-AMG GT3 Evo	81	(Switzerland) Yannick Mettler	B	3
(France) / Mercedes-AMG Team AKKodis ASP (Note: Car No. 87 entered as Mercedes-AMG Team AKKodis ASP. Cars No. 88 and No. 89 entered as AKKodis ASP Team.); (France) / AKKodis ASP Team	Mercedes-AMG GT3 Evo	87	(France) Thomas Drouet	P	All
(France) / Mercedes-AMG Team AKKodis ASP; (France) / AKKodis ASP Team	Mercedes-AMG GT3 Evo	87	(Italy) Lorenzo Ferrari	P	All
(France) / Mercedes-AMG Team AKKodis ASP; (France) / AKKodis ASP Team	Mercedes-AMG GT3 Evo	87	(Germany) Maximilian Götz	P	All
(France) / Mercedes-AMG Team AKKodis ASP; (France) / AKKodis ASP Team	Mercedes-AMG GT3 Evo	88	Timur Boguslavskiy	P	All
(France) / Mercedes-AMG Team AKKodis ASP; (France) / AKKodis ASP Team	Mercedes-AMG GT3 Evo	88	(Andorra) Jules Gounon	P	All
(France) / Mercedes-AMG Team AKKodis ASP; (France) / AKKodis ASP Team	Mercedes-AMG GT3 Evo	88	(Switzerland) Raffaele Marciello	P	All
(France) / Mercedes-AMG Team AKKodis ASP; (France) / AKKodis ASP Team	Mercedes-AMG GT3 Evo	89	(Brazil) Adalberto Baptista	B	2–3, 5
(France) / Mercedes-AMG Team AKKodis ASP; (France) / AKKodis ASP Team	Mercedes-AMG GT3 Evo	89	(Brazil) Bruno Baptista	B	2–3, 5
(France) / Mercedes-AMG Team AKKodis ASP; (France) / AKKodis ASP Team	Mercedes-AMG GT3 Evo	89	(Brazil) Rodrigo Baptista	B	2–3, 5
(France) / Mercedes-AMG Team AKKodis ASP; (France) / AKKodis ASP Team	Mercedes-AMG GT3 Evo	89	(Brazil) Alan Hellmeister	B	3
(Spain) Madpanda Motorsport	Mercedes-AMG GT3 Evo	90	(Norway) Magnus Gustavsen	S	All
(Spain) Madpanda Motorsport	Mercedes-AMG GT3 Evo	90	Alexey Nesov	S	All
(Spain) Madpanda Motorsport	Mercedes-AMG GT3 Evo	90	(Argentina) Ezequiel Pérez Companc	S	All
(Spain) Madpanda Motorsport	Mercedes-AMG GT3 Evo	90	(Finland) Jesse Salmenautio	S	3
(Germany) Herberth Motorsport (Note: Car No. 91 entered as Herberth Motorsport. Car No. 911 entered as Pure Rxcing.) (Lithuania) Pure Rxcing	Porsche 911 GT3 R (991) 1 Porsche 911 GT3 R (992) 2–5	91	(Germany) Ralf Bohn	B	All
(Germany) Herberth Motorsport (Lithuania) Pure Rxcing	Porsche 911 GT3 R (991) 1 Porsche 911 GT3 R (992) 2–5	91	(Germany) Robert Renauer	B	All
(Germany) Herberth Motorsport (Lithuania) Pure Rxcing	Porsche 911 GT3 R (991) 1 Porsche 911 GT3 R (992) 2–5	91	(Germany) Alfred Renauer	B	1–3, 5
(Germany) Herberth Motorsport (Lithuania) Pure Rxcing	Porsche 911 GT3 R (991) 1 Porsche 911 GT3 R (992) 2–5	91	(Netherlands) Kay van Berlo	B	3
(Germany) Herberth Motorsport (Lithuania) Pure Rxcing	Porsche 911 GT3 R (991) 1 Porsche 911 GT3 R (992) 2–5	91	(Germany) Tim Heinemann	B	4
(Germany) Herberth Motorsport (Lithuania) Pure Rxcing	Porsche 911 GT3 R (992)	911	(Austria) Klaus Bachler	B	All
(Germany) Herberth Motorsport (Lithuania) Pure Rxcing	Porsche 911 GT3 R (992)	911	(United Kingdom) Alex Malykhin (Note: Malykhin is Belarusian, but he competes under a British licence as Belarusian national emblems were banned by the FIA following the Russian invasion of Ukraine.)	B	All
(Germany) Herberth Motorsport (Lithuania) Pure Rxcing	Porsche 911 GT3 R (992)	911	(Germany) Joel Sturm	B	All
(Germany) Herberth Motorsport (Lithuania) Pure Rxcing	Porsche 911 GT3 R (992)	911	(Germany) Marco Seefried	B	3
(Germany) Manthey EMA	Porsche 911 GT3 R (992)	92	(France) Julien Andlauer	P	3
(Germany) Manthey EMA	Porsche 911 GT3 R (992)	92	(France) Kévin Estre	P	3
(Germany) Manthey EMA	Porsche 911 GT3 R (992)	92	(Belgium) Laurens Vanthoor	P	3
(United Kingdom) Sky – Tempesta Racing	McLaren 720S GT3 Evo	93	(Italy) Eddie Cheever III	B	All
(United Kingdom) Sky – Tempesta Racing	McLaren 720S GT3 Evo	93	(United Kingdom) Chris Froggatt	B	All
(United Kingdom) Sky – Tempesta Racing	McLaren 720S GT3 Evo	93	(Hong Kong) Jonathan Hui	B	All
(United Kingdom) Sky – Tempesta Racing	McLaren 720S GT3 Evo	93	(Switzerland) Jeffrey Schmidt	B	3
(United Kingdom) Garage 59	McLaren 720S GT3 Evo	159	(Germany) Benjamin Goethe	P	All
(United Kingdom) Garage 59	McLaren 720S GT3 Evo	159	(Germany) Marvin Kirchhöfer	P	All
(United Kingdom) Garage 59	McLaren 720S GT3 Evo	159	(Denmark) Nicolai Kjærgaard	P	All
(United Kingdom) Garage 59	McLaren 720S GT3 Evo	188	(Portugal) Henrique Chaves	B	All
(United Kingdom) Garage 59	McLaren 720S GT3 Evo	188	(Monaco) Louis Prette	B	All
(United Kingdom) Garage 59	McLaren 720S GT3 Evo	188	(Portugal) Miguel Ramos	B	All
(United Kingdom) Garage 59	McLaren 720S GT3 Evo	188	(United States) Conrad Grunewald	B	3
(Germany) Rutronik Racing	Porsche 911 GT3 R (992)	96	(Germany) Laurin Heinrich	P	All
(Germany) Rutronik Racing	Porsche 911 GT3 R (992)	96	(Norway) Dennis Olsen	P	All
(Germany) Rutronik Racing	Porsche 911 GT3 R (992)	96	(Austria) Thomas Preining	P	All
(Germany) ROWE Racing	BMW M4 GT3	98	(Austria) Philipp Eng	P	All
(Germany) ROWE Racing	BMW M4 GT3	98	(Germany) Marco Wittmann	P	All
(Germany) ROWE Racing	BMW M4 GT3	98	(United Kingdom) Nick Yelloly	P	All
(Germany) ROWE Racing	BMW M4 GT3	998	(United Kingdom) Daniel Harper	P	All
(Germany) ROWE Racing	BMW M4 GT3	998	(Germany) Max Hesse	P	All
(Germany) ROWE Racing	BMW M4 GT3	998	(United States) Neil Verhagen	P	All
(Hong Kong) Modena Motorsports	Porsche 911 GT3 R (992)	216	(Switzerland) Mathias Beche	PA	3
(Hong Kong) Modena Motorsports	Porsche 911 GT3 R (992)	216	(Canada) John Shen	PA	3
(Hong Kong) Modena Motorsports	Porsche 911 GT3 R (992)	216	(Denmark) Benny Simonsen	PA	3
(Hong Kong) Modena Motorsports	Porsche 911 GT3 R (992)	216	(Netherlands) Francis Tjia	PA	3
(France) CSA Racing	Audi R8 LMS Evo II	888	(France) Arthur Rougier	B	1–2, 5
(France) CSA Racing	Audi R8 LMS Evo II	888	(France) Erwin Creed	B	1–2
(France) CSA Racing	Audi R8 LMS Evo II	888	(Poland) Igor Waliłko	B	1
(France) CSA Racing	Audi R8 LMS Evo II	888	(Switzerland) Lucas Légeret	B	2
(France) CSA Racing	Audi R8 LMS Evo II	888	(France) Alexandre Cougnaud	B	5
(France) CSA Racing	Audi R8 LMS Evo II	888	(France) Arnold Robin	B	5
(France) CSA Racing	Audi R8 LMS Evo II	888	(France) Erwin Creed	PA	3–4
(France) CSA Racing	Audi R8 LMS Evo II	888	(France) Arthur Rougier	PA	3–4
(France) CSA Racing	Audi R8 LMS Evo II	888	(Belgium) Jean Glorieux	PA	3
(France) CSA Racing	Audi R8 LMS Evo II	888	(United Kingdom) Casper Stevenson	PA	3
(Hong Kong) Mercedes-AMG Team GruppeM Racing	Mercedes-AMG GT3 Evo	999	(Germany) Maro Engel	P	3
(Hong Kong) Mercedes-AMG Team GruppeM Racing	Mercedes-AMG GT3 Evo	999	(Canada) Mikaël Grenier	P	3
(Hong Kong) Mercedes-AMG Team GruppeM Racing	Mercedes-AMG GT3 Evo	999	(Spain) Daniel Juncadella	P	3

Icon	Class
P	Pro Cup
G	Gold Cup
S	Silver Cup
B	Bronze Cup
PA	Pro-Am Cup

- Zdeněk Chovanec was scheduled to compete for GetSpeed, but withdrew prior to the start of the season.

== Race results ==
Bold indicates the overall winner.

Round	Circuit	Pole position	Overall winners	Gold winners	Silver winners	Bronze winners	Pro/Am winners	Report
1	(Italy) Monza	(Germany) #98 ROWE Racing	**(Germany) #98 ROWE Racing**	(Belgium) #21 Comtoyou Racing	(Belgium) #12 Comtoyou Racing	(Lithuania) #911 Pure Rxcing	(United Kingdom) #78 Barwell Motorsport	report
1	(Italy) Monza	(Austria) Philipp Eng (Germany) Marco Wittmann (United Kingdom) Nick Yelloly	**(Austria) Philipp Eng** **(Germany) Marco Wittmann** **(United Kingdom) Nick Yelloly**	(Belgium) Nicolas Baert (Austria) Max Hofer (Belgium) Maxime Soulet	(Belgium) Sam Dejonghe (Netherlands) Loris Hezemans (United Kingdom) Finlay Hutchison	(Austria) Klaus Bachler (United Kingdom) Alex Malykhin (Germany) Joel Sturm	(United Kingdom) Adam Balon (United Kingdom) Rob Collard (Denmark) Dennis Lind	report
2	(France) Paul Ricard	(France) #88 AKKodis ASP Team	**(France) #88 AKKodis ASP Team**	(Belgium) #21 Comtoyou Racing	(Germany) #99 Tresor Attempto Racing	(Germany) #79 Haupt Racing Team	(Germany) #24 Car Collection Motorsport	report
2	(France) Paul Ricard	(Switzerland) Raffaele Marciello; Timur Boguslavskiy (Andorra) Jules Gounon	**(Switzerland) Raffaele Marciello**; **Timur Boguslavskiy** **(Andorra) Jules Gounon**	(Belgium) Nicolas Baert (Austria) Max Hofer (Belgium) Maxime Soulet	(Germany) Alex Aka (Italy) Pietro Delli Guanti (Italy) Lorenzo Patrese	(France) Sébastien Baud (Germany) Hubert Haupt (India) Arjun Maini	(Switzerland) Alex Fontana (Switzerland) Ivan Jacoma (Switzerland) Nicolas Leutwiler	report
3	(Belgium) Spa-Francorchamps	(Germany) #20 Huber Motorsport	**(Germany) #98 ROWE Racing**	(United Kingdom) #5 Optimum Motorsport	(Austria) #85 GRT Grasser Racing Team	(Germany) #20 Huber Motorsport	(Australia) #75 SunEnergy1 Racing	report
3	(Belgium) Spa-Francorchamps	(Hong Kong) Antares Au (Italy) Matteo Cairoli (Germany) Jannes Fittje (Germany) Tim Heinemann	**(Austria) Philipp Eng** **(Germany) Marco Wittmann** **(United Kingdom) Nick Yelloly**	(United Kingdom) Sam De Haan (United Kingdom) Charlie Fagg (United Kingdom) Tom Gamble (United Kingdom) Dean MacDonald	(Chile) Benjamín Hites (Austria) Clemens Schmid (Netherlands) Glenn van Berlo	(Hong Kong) Antares Au (Italy) Matteo Cairoli (Germany) Jannes Fittje (Germany) Tim Heinemann	(Netherlands) Nicky Catsburg (Austria) Martin Konrad (Australia) Chaz Mostert (Germany) Adam Osieka	report
4	(Germany) Nürburgring	(France) #88 AKKodis ASP Team	**(France) #88 AKKodis ASP Team**	(United States) #157 Winward Racing	(Austria) #85 GRT - Grasser Racing Team	(Germany) #91 Herberth Motorsport	(United Kingdom) #78 Barwell Motorsport	report
4	(Germany) Nürburgring	(Switzerland) Raffaele Marciello; Timur Boguslavskiy (Andorra) Jules Gounon	**(Switzerland) Raffaele Marciello**; **Timur Boguslavskiy** **(Andorra) Jules Gounon**	(Switzerland) Miklas Born (Germany) David Schumacher (Germany) Marius Zug	(Chile) Benjamín Hites (Austria) Clemens Schmid (Netherlands) Glenn van Berlo	(Germany) Ralf Bohn (Germany) Tim Heinemann (Germany) Robert Renauer	(United Kingdom) Rob Collard (Denmark) Dennis Lind	report
5	(Spain) Barcelona	(Italy) #51 AF Corse - Francorchamps Motors	**(Italy) #51 AF Corse - Francorchamps Motors**	(Belgium) #9 Boutsen VDS	(Austria) #58 GRT - Grasser Racing Team	(United Kingdom) #188 Garage 59	(Germany) #38 ST Racing with Rinaldi	report
5	(Spain) Barcelona	(Denmark) Nicklas Nielsen (Italy) Alessio Rovera (Israel) Robert Shwartzman	**(Denmark) Nicklas Nielsen** **(Italy) Alessio Rovera** **(Israel) Robert Shwartzman**	(Italy) Alberto Di Folco (France) Adam Eteki (France) Aurélien Panis	(Italy) Fabrizio Crestani (United Kingdom) Sam Neary (Austria) Gerhard Tweraser	(Portugal) Henrique Chaves (Monaco) Louis Prette (Portugal) Miguel Ramos	(United Kingdom) Lorcan Hanafin (Canada) Samantha Tan (Spain) Isaac Tutumlu	report

== Championship standings ==
Scoring system

Championship points are awarded for the first ten positions in each race. The pole-sitter also receives one point and entries are required to complete 75% of the winning car's race distance in order to be classified and earn points. Individual drivers are required to participate for a minimum of 25 minutes in order to earn championship points in any race.

Monza, Nürburgring & Barcelona points

Position	1st	2nd	3rd	4th	5th	6th	7th	8th	9th	10th	Pole
Points	25	18	15	12	10	8	6	4	2	1	1

Paul Ricard points

Position	1st	2nd	3rd	4th	5th	6th	7th	8th	9th	10th	Pole
Points	33	24	19	15	12	9	6	4	2	1	1

24 Hours of Spa points

Points are awarded after six hours, after twelve hours and at the finish.

Position	1st	2nd	3rd	4th	5th	6th	7th	8th	9th	10th	Pole
Points after 6hrs/12hrs	12	9	7	6	5	4	3	2	1	0	1
Points at the finish	25	18	15	12	10	8	6	4	2	1	1

=== Drivers' Championship ===
==== Overall ====
Pos.	Drivers	Team	MNZ (Italy)	LEC (France)	SPA (Belgium)			NÜR (Germany)	BAR (Spain)	Points
Pos.	Drivers	Team	MNZ (Italy)	LEC (France)	6hrs	12hrs	24hrs	NÜR (Germany)	BAR (Spain)	Points
1	Timur Boguslavskiy (Andorra) Jules Gounon (Switzerland) Raffaele Marciello	(France) AKKodis ASP Team	Ret	1^{P}	3	2	2	1^{PF}	5	104
2	(Austria) Philipp Eng (Germany) Marco Wittmann (United Kingdom) Nick Yelloly	(Germany) ROWE Racing	1^{P}	3	8	6	1	15	10	77
3	(Germany) Maro Engel	(Oman) Mercedes-AMG Team AlManar	Ret	2				2	4	61
3	(Germany) Maro Engel	(Hong Kong) Mercedes-AMG Team GruppeM Racing			19	3	Ret			61
4	(Germany) Fabian Schiller (Germany) Luca Stolz	(Oman) Mercedes-AMG Team AlManar	Ret	2	9	15	9	2	4	57
5	(San Marino) Mattia Drudi (Switzerland) Ricardo Feller (Germany) Dennis Marschall	(Germany) Tresor Orange1 (Germany) Audi Sport Tresor Orange1	5	Ret	6	1	7	3	Ret	47
6	(France) Simon Gachet (Germany) Christopher Mies (Switzerland) Patric Niederhauser	(France) Saintéloc Junior Team (France) Audi Sport Team Saintéloc	4	4	23	24	16	4	9	41
7	(Germany) Laurin Heinrich (Norway) Dennis Olsen (Austria) Thomas Preining	(Germany) Rutronik Racing	10^{F}	Ret	12	8	5	5	3	38
8	(Denmark) Nicklas Nielsen (Italy) Alessio Rovera (Israel) Robert Shwartzman	(Italy) AF Corse - Francorchamps Motors	8	7	29	25	44†	22	1^{P}	36
9	(United Kingdom) Daniel Harper (Germany) Max Hesse (United States) Neil Verhagen	(Germany) ROWE Racing	2	6	4	53†	Ret	11	12	33
10	(Italy) Antonio Fuoco (Italy) Davide Rigon	(Italy) AF Corse - Francorchamps Motors	14	5	7	17	11	14	2	33
10	(Brazil) Daniel Serra	(Italy) AF Corse - Francorchamps Motors		5	7	17	11	14	2	33
11	(South Africa) Sheldon van der Linde (Belgium) Dries Vanthoor (Belgium) Charles Weerts	(Belgium) Team WRT	6	Ret	1	52†	Ret	7	11	26
12	(South Africa) Kelvin van der Linde (Germany) Luca Engstler (Denmark) Nicki Thiim	(Germany) Scherer Sport PHX			2	12	3			24
13	(France) Kévin Estre (France) Julien Andlauer (Belgium) Laurens Vanthoor	(Germany) Manthey EMA			5	7	4			20
14	(Italy) Mirko Bortolotti (Italy) Andrea Caldarelli (South Africa) Jordan Pepper	(Italy) Iron Lynx	3	39†	61	Ret	Ret	Ret	20	15
15	(Brazil) Augusto Farfus (Belgium) Maxime Martin (Italy) Valentino Rossi	(Belgium) Team WRT	Ret	8	13	9	6	49†	Ret	13
16	(Germany) Christian Engelhart (Turkey) Ayhancan Güven (Germany) Sven Müller	(Italy) Dinamic GT Huber Racing (Italy) Dinamic GT	9	Ret	16	13	12	10	6	11
17	(Switzerland) Miklas Born (Germany) David Schumacher (Germany) Marius Zug	(United States) Winward Racing	26	10	22	58†	Ret	6	14	9
18	(Belgium) Nicolas Baert (Belgium) Maxime Soulet	(Belgium) Comtoyou Racing	7	9	34	26	21	21	35	8
18	(Austria) Max Hofer	(Belgium) Comtoyou Racing	7	9	34	26	21		35	8
19	(Germany) Christopher Haase (Belgium) Frédéric Vervisch	(Belgium) Comtoyou Racing (Belgium) Audi Sport Team Comtoyou	Ret	42†	18	16	8	8	49†	8
20	(Spain) Daniel Juncadella (Canada) Mikaël Grenier	(Hong Kong) Mercedes-AMG Team GruppeM Racing			19	3	Ret			7
21	(United Kingdom) Sam De Haan (United Kingdom) Charlie Fagg (United Kingdom) Dean MacDonald	(United Kingdom) Optimum Motorsport	11	Ret	31	4	10	45	Ret	7
21	(United Kingdom) Tom Gamble	(United Kingdom) Optimum Motorsport			31	4	10			7
22	(France) Thomas Drouet (Italy) Lorenzo Ferrari (Germany) Maximilian Götz	(France) Mercedes-AMG Team AKKodis ASP	13	13	15	10	Ret	Ret	7	6
23	(Portugal) Henrique Chaves (Monaco) Louis Prette (Portugal) Miguel Ramos	(United Kingdom) Garage 59	20	33†	11	5	34	25	18	5
23	(United States) Conrad Grunewald	(United Kingdom) Garage 59			11	5	34			5
24	(Belgium) Gilles Magnus	(Belgium) Comtoyou Racing (Belgium) Audi Sport Team Comtoyou	Ret	42†	18	16	8	21	49†	4
24	(Belgium) Kobe Pauwels	(Belgium) Comtoyou Racing						8		4
24	(Germany) Benjamin Goethe (Germany) Marvin Kirchhöfer (Denmark) Nicolai Kjærgaard	(United Kingdom) Garage 59	19	12	10	59†	Ret	13	8^{F}	4
25	(Austria) Lucas Auer	(Oman) Mercedes-AMG Team AlManar			9	15	9			3
25	(Austria) Lucas Auer	(Germany) GetSpeed							45†	3
26	(Italy) Marco Mapelli (United Kingdom) Sandy Mitchell (France) Franck Perera	(United States) K-Pax Racing	Ret	23	17	11	29	9	44	2
27	(Austria) Klaus Bachler (United Kingdom) Alex Malykhin (Germany) Joel Sturm	(Lithuania) Pure Rxcing	15	Ret	25	21	15	26	Ret	1
27	(Germany) Marco Seefried	(Lithuania) Pure Rxcing			25	21	15			1
-	(Germany) Tim Heinemann	(Germany) Huber Motorsport			27	27	13^{PF}			0
-	(Germany) Tim Heinemann	(Germany) Herberth Motorsport						19		0
-	(Hong Kong) Antares Au (Italy) Matteo Cairoli (Germany) Jannes Fittje	(Germany) Huber Motorsport			27	27	13^{PF}			0
-	(Italy) Alberto Di Folco (France) Adam Eteki (France) Aurélien Panis	(Belgium) Boutsen VDS	Ret	11	14	46	32	20	13	0
-	(France) Thomas Laurent	(Belgium) Boutsen VDS			14	46	32			0
-	(Germany) Niklas Krütten (France) Jean-Baptiste Simmenauer (Australia) Calan Williams	(Belgium) Team WRT	12	Ret	20	18	14	16	21	0
-	(France) Sébastien Baud (Germany) Hubert Haupt (India) Arjun Maini	(Germany) Haupt Racing Team	18	14	36	34	24	24	25	0
-	(Australia) Jordan Love	(Germany) Haupt Racing Team			36	34	24			0
-	(Italy) Alessandro Pier Guidi	(Italy) AF Corse - Francorchamps Motors	14							0
-	(Germany) Alex Aka (Italy) Pietro Delli Guanti (Italy) Lorenzo Patrese	(Germany) Tresor Attempto Racing (Germany) Tresor Orange1	Ret	15	21	23	47†	18	28	0
-	(Netherlands) Indy Dontje (Switzerland) Philip Ellis (United States) Russell Ward	(United States) Winward Racing	23	Ret	56	37	38	Ret	15	0
-	(Belgium) Sam Dejonghe (Netherlands) Loris Hezemans (United Kingdom) Finlay Hutchison	(Belgium) Comtoyou Racing	16	19	33	22	19	27	33	0
-	(Italy) Andrea Bertolini (Belgium) Jef Machiels (Belgium) Louis Machiels	(Italy) AF Corse	36	16	57	32	26	36	31	0
-	(France) Lilou Wadoux	(Italy) AF Corse			57	32	26		22	0
-	(Italy) Eddie Cheever III (United Kingdom) Chris Froggatt (Hong Kong) Jonathan Hui	(United Kingdom) Sky – Tempesta Racing	17	18	32	14	18	23	27	0
-	(Switzerland) Jeffrey Schmidt	(United Kingdom) Sky – Tempesta Racing			32	14	18			0
-	(Chile) Benjamín Hites (Austria) Clemens Schmid	(Austria) GRT Grasser Racing Team	Ret	17	24	20	17	17	17	0
-	(Netherlands) Glenn van Berlo	(Austria) GRT Grasser Racing Team		17	24	20	17	17	17	0
-	(Germany) Ralf Bohn (Germany) Robert Renauer	(Germany) Herberth Motorsport	21	20	26	19	27	19	19	0
-	(Germany) Alfred Renauer	(Germany) Herberth Motorsport	21	20	26	19	27		19	0
-	(Switzerland) Lucas Légeret	(France) CSA Racing		38^{F}						0
-	(Switzerland) Lucas Légeret	(Belgium) Comtoyou Racing			33	22	19			0
-	(Netherlands) Kay van Berlo	(Austria) GRT Grasser Racing Team	Ret							0
-	(Netherlands) Kay van Berlo	(Germany) Herberth Motorsport			26	19	27			0
-	(Italy) Andrea Cola (France) César Gazeau (United States) Roee Meyuhas	(Belgium) Boutsen VDS	33	21	41	63†	Ret	38	Ret	0
-	(France) Loris Cabirou	(Belgium) Boutsen VDS			41	63†	Ret			0
-	(Norway) Magnus Gustavsen; Alexey Nesov (Argentina) Ezequiel Pérez Companc	(Spain) Madpanda Motorsport	25	22	39	54	39	48†	46†	0
-	(Finland) Jesse Salmenautio	(Spain) Madpanda Motorsport			39	54	39			0
-	(Norway) Anders Buchardt (United Kingdom) James Kell	(Germany) Walkenhorst Motorsport	22	Ret	45	31	46†	41	30	0
-	(France) Thomas Neubauer	(Germany) Walkenhorst Motorsport	22	Ret	45	31	46†	41		0
-	(United Kingdom) Bailey Voisin	(Germany) Walkenhorst Motorsport			45	31	46†			0
-	(Netherlands) Nicky Catsburg (Austria) Martin Konrad (Australia) Chaz Mostert	(United States) SunEnergy1 Racing			53	39	22			0
-	(Germany) Adam Osieka	(United States) SunEnergy1 Racing			53	39	22			0
-	(Germany) Adam Osieka	(Germany) GetSpeed							40	0
-	(France) Hugo Chevalier	(France) CLRT	24	41†	38	30	20			0
-	(France) Clément Mateu (France) Steven Palette	(France) CLRT	24	41†	38	30	20	33	24	0
-	(France) Frédéric Makowiecki	(France) CLRT			38	30	20	33	24	0
-	(United States) Manny Franco (Monaco) Cédric Sbirrazzuoli	(Italy) AF Corse							22	0
-	(France) Erwan Bastard (France) Grégoire Demoustier (France) Paul Evrard	(France) Saintéloc Junior Team	41	24	47	43	30	35	23	0
-	(France) Antoine Doquin	(France) Saintéloc Junior Team			47	43	30			0
-	(United Kingdom) Tim Whale	(Belgium) Team WRT	29	25	WD	WD	WD		29	0
-	(United Kingdom) Adam Carroll	(Belgium) Team WRT	29	25	62	42	25			0
-	(United Kingdom) Lewis Proctor	(Belgium) Team WRT	29	25	62	42	25	28	29	0
-	(Germany) Jens Klingmann (United Kingdom) Darren Leung	(Belgium) Team WRT						28		0
-	(Switzerland) Antonin Borga (Italy) Leonardo Gorini (France) Nico Jamin	(France) AGS Events	35	26	65	56	Ret	39		0
-	Andrey Mukovoz (Luxembourg) Dylan Pereira	(Germany) Tresor Attempto Racing	31	27	43	29	28	31	42	0
-	(Italy) Kikko Galbiati	(Germany) Tresor Attempto Racing	31	27	43	29	28	31		0
-	(Singapore) Sean Hudspeth	(Germany) Tresor Attempto Racing			43	29	28			0
-	(Australia) Ricky Capo	(Austria) GRT Grasser Racing Team	27	Ret	28	62†	Ret			0
-	(Italy) Fabrizio Crestani (United Kingdom) Sam Neary	(Austria) GRT Grasser Racing Team	27	Ret	28	62†	Ret	47	16	0
-	(Austria) Gerhard Tweraser	(Austria) GRT Grasser Racing Team			28	62†	Ret	47	16	0
-	(Belgium) Sarah Bovy (Switzerland) Rahel Frey (Denmark) Michelle Gatting	(Italy) Iron Dames	28	29	42	Ret	Ret	Ret	34	0
-	(France) Doriane Pin	(Italy) Iron Dames			42	Ret	Ret			0
-	(United Kingdom) Ben Barker (Norway) Marius Nakken (Austria) Philipp Sager	(Italy) Dinamic GT Huber Racing (Italy) Dinamic GT	43†	28	44	38	48†	34	26	0
-	(Austria) Christopher Zöchling	(Italy) Dinamic GT Huber Racing (Italy) Dinamic GT			44	38	48†			0
-	(Austria) Christopher Zöchling	(Germany) Tresor Attempto Racing							42	0
-	(New Zealand) Earl Bamber (Australia) Brenton Grove (Australia) Stephen Grove (Australia) Anton de Pasquale	(Australia) Grove Racing			48	28	45			0
-	(Finland) Jesse Krohn	(Belgium) Team WRT							29	0
-	(United Kingdom) Kiern Jewiss (United Kingdom) Derek Pierce	(United Kingdom) Team Parker Racing	34	30	49	33	33	45		0
-	(United Kingdom) Andy Meyrick	(United Kingdom) Team Parker Racing		30	49	33	33	45		0
-	(Netherlands) Xavier Maassen	(United Kingdom) Team Parker Racing			49	33	33			0
-	(United Kingdom) Rob Collard (Denmark) Dennis Lind	(United Kingdom) Barwell Motorsport	30	Ret	64	Ret	Ret	32	37	0
-	(United Kingdom) Adam Balon	(United Kingdom) Barwell Motorsport	30	Ret					37	0
-	(Switzerland) Alex Fontana (Switzerland) Ivan Jacoma (Switzerland) Nicolas Leutwiler	(Germany) Car Collection Motorsport	Ret	31	35	36	23	42	41	0
-	(Germany) Nico Menzel	(Germany) Car Collection Motorsport			35	36	23			0
-	(Germany) Patrick Assenheimer (Germany) Florian Scholze	(Germany) GetSpeed	Ret	Ret	54	40	32	50†	45†	0
-	(Australia) Alex Peroni	(Germany) GetSpeed	Ret	Ret	54	40	32	50†		0
-	(Germany) Kenneth Heyer	(Germany) GetSpeed			54	40	32			0
-	(Canada) Samantha Tan (Spain) Isaac Tutumlu	(Germany) ST Racing with Rinaldi	Ret	32	63	61†	Ret	43	32	0
-	(United States) Jon Miller	(Germany) ST Racing with Rinaldi	Ret	32	63	61†	Ret	43		0
-	(Germany) Leonard Weiss	(Germany) ST Racing with Rinaldi			63	61†	Ret			0
-	(United Kingdom) Lorcan Hanafin	(Germany) ST Racing with Rinaldi							32	0
-	(Italy) Marco Cassarà (Italy) Stefano Comandini (Italy) Francesco Guerra	(Italy) BMW Italia Ceccato Racing	32							0
-	(Italy) Michele Beretta (Italy) Leonardo Pulcini	(Italy) Iron Lynx	Ret	34	30	48	Ret	12	Ret	0
-	(Switzerland) Rolf Ineichen	(Italy) Iron Lynx	Ret	34	30	48	Ret	12		0
-	(New Zealand) Jaxon Evans	(United Kingdom) Team Parker Racing	34							0
-	(France) Dorian Boccolacci (France) Emil Caumes (France) Stéphane Denoual	(France) CLRT		35						0
-	(United States) Jean-Francois Brunot (New Zealand) Brendon Leitch (China) Kerong Li	(Germany) Leipert Motorsport (Germany) CrowdStrike Racing by Leipert Motorsport		36	68	64†	Ret			0
-	(France) Arthur Rougier	(France) CSA Racing	37	38^{F}	37	35	35	Ret	38	0
-	(France) Erwin Creed	(France) CSA Racing	37	38^{F}	37	35	35	Ret		0
-	(Belgium) Jean Glorieux (United Kingdom) Casper Stevenson	(France) CSA Racing			37	35	35			0
-	(Switzerland) Mathias Beche (Canada) John Shen (Denmark) Benny Simonsen (Netherlands) Francis Tjia	(Hong Kong) Modena Motorsports			66	50	36			0
-	(Poland) Andrzej Lewandowski (United Kingdom) Aaron Walker	(Germany) GetSpeed	42	37	60	Ret	Ret	44	40	0
-	(United States) Lance Bergstein	(Germany) GetSpeed	42	37	60	Ret	Ret	44		0
-	(United Kingdom) Lewis Williamson	(Germany) GetSpeed			60	Ret	Ret			0
-	(Poland) Igor Waliłko	(France) CSA Racing	37							0
-	(Hong Kong) Adderly Fong (China) Xiaole He (China) Junlin Pan (Hong Kong) "Rio"	(China) Uno Racing Team			59	49	37			0
-	(Estonia) Ralf Aron (Saudi Arabia) Reema Juffali (Switzerland) Alain Valente	(Saudi Arabia) Theeba Motorsport	38	43†	52	60†	Ret	29	36	0
-	(Switzerland) Yannick Mettler	(Saudi Arabia) Theeba Motorsport			52	60†	Ret			0
-	(Italy) Daniele Di Amato (Netherlands) Jop Rappange (Thailand) Tanart Sathienthirakul	(Italy) Dinamic GT Huber Racing (Italy) Dinamic GT with Car Collection	39	Ret	51	41	31	40	47†	0
-	(Belgium) Adrien de Leener	(Italy) Dinamic GT Huber Racing (Italy) Dinamic GT with Car Collection			51	41	31			0
-	(France) Romain Leroux (Germany) Jacob Riegel	(Spain) Bullitt Racing	40	Ret	67	51	40	30	39	0
-	(Canada) Jeff Kingsley	(Spain) Bullitt Racing	40	Ret	67	51	40	30		0
-	(Netherlands) Ruben del Sarte	(Spain) Bullitt Racing			67	51	40			0
-	(France) Alexandre Cougnaud (France) Arnold Robin	(France) CSA Racing							38	0
-	(United States) Colin Braun (Brazil) Felipe Fraga (United Kingdom) Ian James (United States) George Kurtz	(United States) CrowdStrike Racing by Riley			40	44	41			0
-	(Brazil) Adalberto Baptista (Brazil) Bruno Baptista (Brazil) Rodrigo Baptista	(France) AKKodis ASP Team		40†	58	45	Ret		43	0
-	(Brazil) Alan Hellmeister	(France) AKKodis ASP Team			58	45	Ret			0
-	(United Kingdom) Simon Mann (Belgium) Ulysse de Pauw (France) Julien Piguet (Argentina) Nicolás Varrone	(Italy) AF Corse			55	55	43			0
-	(Mexico) Luis Michael Dörrbecker (Belgium) Baptiste Moulin (Norway) Marcus Påverud (Israel) Artem Petrov	(Italy) VSR			46	57	49†			0
-	(United Kingdom) Matt Bell (United Kingdom) Frank Bird (United Kingdom) James Cottingham (United States) Naveen Rao	(Germany) Haupt Racing Team			50	47	Ret			0
-	(Finland) Patrick Kujala (United Arab Emirates) Bashar Mardini	(United Kingdom) Barwell Motorsport			64	Ret	Ret			0
-	(United States) Brendan Iribe (United Kingdom) Ollie Millroy (Spain) Fran Rueda (Denmark) Frederik Schandorff	(United States) Inception Racing			Ret	Ret	Ret			0
-	(Netherlands) Jeroen Bleekemolen (United States) Patrick Long (United States) James Sofronas (United States) Kyle Washington	(United States) GMG Racing by Car Collection Motorsport			Ret	Ret	Ret			0
-	(France) Pierre-Louis Chovet	(Italy) Iron Lynx							Ret	0
-	(Australia) Kenny Habul	(United States) SunEnergy1 Racing			WD	WD	WD			-
Pos.	Drivers	Team	MNZ (Italy)	LEC (France)	SPA (Belgium)			NÜR (Germany)	BAR (Spain)	Points
Pos.	Drivers	Team	MNZ (Italy)	LEC (France)	6hrs	12hrs	24hrs	NÜR (Germany)	BAR (Spain)	Points

Key
Colour	Result
Gold	Race winner
Silver	2nd place
Bronze	3rd place
Green	Points finish
Blue	Non-points finish
Blue	Non-classified finish (NC)
Purple	Did not finish (Ret)
Black	Disqualified (DSQ)
Black	Excluded (EX)
White	Did not start (DNS)
White	Race cancelled (C)
White	Withdrew (WD)
Blank	Did not participate

^{P} – Pole
^{F} – Fastest Lap

Notes:

- † – Entry did not finish the race but was classified, as it completed more than 75% of the race distance.

==== Gold Cup ====
Pos.	Drivers	Team	MNZ (Italy)	LEC (France)	SPA (Belgium)			NÜR (Germany)	BAR (Spain)	Points
Pos.	Drivers	Team	MNZ (Italy)	LEC (France)	6hrs	12hrs	24hrs	NÜR (Germany)	BAR (Spain)	Points
1	(Belgium) Nicolas Baert (Belgium) Maxime Soulet	(Belgium) Comtoyou Racing	7^{F}	9	34	26	21	21	35	104
2	(Austria) Max Hofer	(Belgium) Comtoyou Racing	7^{F}	9	34	26	21		35	94
3	(Switzerland) Miklas Born (Germany) David Schumacher (Germany) Marius Zug	(United States) Winward Racing	26	10	22	58†	Ret	6^{PF}	14	88
4	(Italy) Alberto Di Folco (France) Adam Eteki (France) Aurélien Panis	(Belgium) Boutsen VDS	Ret	11^{F}	14	46	42	20	13	83
5	(Germany) Niklas Krütten (France) Jean-Baptiste Simmenauer (Australia) Calan Williams	(Belgium) Team WRT	12	Ret	20	18	14	16	21	78
6	(United Kingdom) Sam De Haan (United Kingdom) Charlie Fagg (United Kingdom) Dean MacDonald	(United Kingdom) Optimum Motorsport	11^{P}	Ret	31	4	10^{PF}	46	Ret	70
7	(Netherlands) Indy Dontje (Switzerland) Philip Ellis (United States) Russell Ward	(United States) Winward Racing	23	Ret^{P}	56	37	38	Ret	15^{F}	49
8	(Italy) Michele Beretta (Italy) Leonardo Pulcini	(Italy) Iron Lynx	Ret	34	30	48	Ret	12	Ret^{P}	44
9	(United Kingdom) Tom Gamble	(United Kingdom) Optimum Motorsport			31	4	10^{PF}			43
10	(Switzerland) Rolf Ineichen	(Italy) Iron Lynx	Ret	34	30	48	Ret	12		43
11	(France) Thomas Laurent	(Belgium) Boutsen VDS			14	46	42			27
12	(Belgium) Gilles Magnus	(Belgium) Comtoyou Racing						21		10
13	(France) Pierre-Louis Chovet	(Italy) Iron Lynx							Ret^{P}	1
Pos.	Drivers	Team	MNZ (Italy)	LEC (France)	SPA (Belgium)			NÜR (Germany)	BAR (Spain)	Points
Pos.	Drivers	Team	MNZ (Italy)	LEC (France)	6hrs	12hrs	24hrs	NÜR (Germany)	BAR (Spain)	Points

==== Silver Cup ====
Pos.	Drivers	Team	MNZ (Italy)	LEC (France)	SPA (Belgium)			NÜR (Germany)	BAR (Spain)	Points
Pos.	Drivers	Team	MNZ (Italy)	LEC (France)	6hrs	12hrs	24hrs	NÜR (Germany)	BAR (Spain)	Points
1	(Chile) Benjamín Hites (Austria) Clemens Schmid	(Austria) GRT Grasser Racing Team	Ret	17^{PF}	24	20	17^{F}	17^{PF}	17^{P}	116
1	(Netherlands) Glenn van Berlo	(Austria) GRT Grasser Racing Team		17^{PF}	24	20	17^{F}	17^{PF}	17^{P}	116
2	(Belgium) Sam Dejonghe (Netherlands) Loris Hezemans (United Kingdom) Finlay Hutchison	(Belgium) Comtoyou Racing	16^{F}	19	33	22	19	27	33	100
3	(Germany) Alex Aka (Italy) Pietro Delli Guanti (Italy) Lorenzo Patrese	(Germany) Tresor Attempto Racing (Germany) Tresor Orange1	Ret^{P}	15	21	23	47†	18	28	87
4	(France) Erwan Bastard (France) Grégoire Demoustier (France) Paul Evrard	(France) Saintéloc Junior Team	41	24	47	43	30	35	23	59
5	(Norway) Magnus Gustavsen; Alexey Nesov (Argentina) Ezequiel Pérez Companc	(Spain) Madpanda Motorsport	25	22	39	54	39	48†	46†	54
6	(Italy) Fabrizio Crestani (United Kingdom) Sam Neary	(Austria) GRT Grasser Racing Team	27	Ret	28	62†	Ret^{P}	47	16^{F}	53
7	(Italy) Andrea Cola (France) César Gazeau (United States) Roee Meyuhas	(Belgium) Boutsen VDS	33	21	41	63†	Ret	38	Ret	39
8	(France) Romain Leroux (Germany) Jacob Riegel	(Spain) Bullitt Racing	40	Ret	67	51	40	30	39	38
9	(Austria) Gerhard Tweraser	(Austria) GRT Grasser Racing Team			28	62†	Ret^{P}	47	16^{F}	37
10	(Italy) Daniele Di Amato (Netherlands) Jop Rappange (Thailand) Tanart Sathienthirakul	(Italy) Dinamic GT Huber Racing (Italy) Dinamic GT with Car Collection	39	Ret	51	41	31	40	47†	37
11	(Switzerland) Lucas Légeret	(Belgium) Comtoyou Racing			33	22	19			33
12	(Canada) Jeff Kingsley	(Spain) Bullitt Racing	40	Ret	67	51	40	30		32
13	(Australia) Ricky Capo	(Austria) GRT Grasser Racing Team	27	Ret	28	62†	Ret^{P}			23
14	(France) Antoine Doquin	(France) Saintéloc Junior Team			47	43	30			22
15	(Belgium) Adrien de Leener	(Italy) Dinamic GT Huber Racing			51	41	31			19
16	(Finland) Jesse Salmenautio	(Spain) Madpanda Motorsport			39	54	39			18
17	(United States) Manny Franco (Monaco) Cédric Sbirrazzuoli (France) Lilou Wadoux	(Italy) AF Corse							22	15
18	(Netherlands) Ruben del Sarte	(Spain) Bullitt Racing			67	51	40			12
19	(Mexico) Michael Dörrbecker (Belgium) Baptiste Moulin (Norway) Marcus Påverud (Israel) Artem Petrov	(Italy) VSR			46	57	49†			10
20	(United States) Jean-Francois Brunot (New Zealand) Brendon Leitch (China) Kerong Li	(Germany) Leipert Motorsport		36						6
21	(France) Maxime Robin	(Spain) Bullitt Racing							39	4
22	(France) Loris Cabirou	(Belgium) Boutsen VDS			41	63†	Ret			4
Pos.	Drivers	Team	MNZ (Italy)	LEC (France)	SPA (Belgium)			NÜR (Germany)	BAR (Spain)	Points
Pos.	Drivers	Team	MNZ (Italy)	LEC (France)	6hrs	12hrs	24hrs	NÜR (Germany)	BAR (Spain)	Points

==== Bronze Cup ====
Pos.	Drivers	Team	MNZ (Italy)	LEC (France)	SPA (Belgium)			NÜR (Germany)	BAR (Spain)	Points
Pos.	Drivers	Team	MNZ (Italy)	LEC (France)	6hrs	12hrs	24hrs	NÜR (Germany)	BAR (Spain)	Points
1	(Italy) Eddie Cheever III (United Kingdom) Chris Froggatt (Hong Kong) Jonathan Hui	(United Kingdom) Sky – Tempesta Racing	17	18	32	14	18	23	27	92
2	(France) Sébastien Baud (Germany) Hubert Haupt (India) Arjun Maini	(Germany) Haupt Racing Team	18	14	36	34	24	24	25	89
3	(Germany) Ralf Bohn (Germany) Robert Renauer	(Germany) Herberth Motorsport	21	20	26	19	27	19	19	88
4	(Portugal) Henrique Chaves (Monaco) Louis Prette (Portugal) Miguel Ramos	(United Kingdom) Garage 59	20^{P}	33†^{P}	11	5	34	25	18^{F}	75
5	(Austria) Klaus Bachler (United Kingdom) Alex Malykhin (Germany) Joel Sturm	(Lithuania) Pure Rxcing	15	Ret	25	21	15	26	Ret^{P}	69
6	(Germany) Alfred Renauer	(Germany) Herberth Motorsport	21	20	26	19	27		19	63
7	(Germany) Tim Heinemann	(Germany) Huber Motorsport			27	27	13^{PF}			61
7	(Germany) Tim Heinemann	(Germany) Herberth Motorsport						19		61
8	(France) Clément Mateu (France) Steven Palette	(France) CLRT	24	41†	38	30	20	33	24	40
9	(Hong Kong) Antares Au (Italy) Matteo Cairoli (Germany) Jannes Fittje	(Germany) Huber Motorsport			27	27	13^{PF}			36
10	(Germany) Marco Seefried	(Lithuania) Pure Rxcing			25	21	15			34
11	(Italy) Andrea Bertolini (Belgium) Jef Machiels (Belgium) Louis Machiels	(Italy) AF Corse	36	16	57	32	26	36	31	34
12	(France) Frédéric Makowiecki	(France) CLRT			38	30	20	33	24	34
13	(Switzerland) Jeffrey Schmidt	(United Kingdom) Sky – Tempesta Racing			32	14	18			29
14	(United Kingdom) Lewis Proctor	(Belgium) Team WRT	29	25				28	29	28
15	(United States) Conrad Grunewald	(United Kingdom) Garage 59			11	5	34			24
16	(France) Hugo Chevalier	(France) CLRT	24	41†	38	30	20			23
17	(Netherlands) Kay van Berlo	(Germany) Herberth Motorsport			26	19	27			20
18	(United Kingdom) Tim Whale	(Belgium) Team WRT	29	25					29	20
19	Andrey Mukovoz (Luxembourg) Dylan Pereira	(Germany) Tresor Attempto Racing	31	27	43	29	28	31	42	19
19	(Italy) Kikko Galbiati	(Germany) Tresor Attempto Racing	31	27	43	29	28	31		19
20	(United Kingdom) Ben Barker (Norway) Marius Nakken (Austria) Philipp Sager	(Italy) Dinamic GT Huber Racing (Italy) Dinamic GT	43†	28	44	38	48†	34^{F}	26	15
21	(Australia) Jordan Love	(Germany) Haupt Racing Team			36	34	24			14
22	(United Kingdom) Adam Carroll	(Belgium) Team WRT	29	25						14
23	(Norway) Anders Buchardt (United Kingdom) James Kell	(Germany) Walkenhorst Motorsport	22	Ret	45	31	46†	41	30	13
24	(Belgium) Sarah Bovy (Switzerland) Rahel Frey (Denmark) Michelle Gatting	(Italy) Iron Dames	28	29	42	Ret	Ret	37^{P}	34	10
25	(France) Thomas Neubauer	(Germany) Walkenhorst Motorsport	22	Ret	45	31	46†	41		9
26	(Switzerland) Antonin Borga (Italy) Leonardo Gorini (France) Nico Jamin	(France) AGS Events	35	26	65	56	Ret	39		9
27	(Germany) Jens Klingmann (United Kingdom) Darren Leung	(Belgium) Team WRT						28		8
28	(France) Lilou Wadoux	(Italy) AF Corse			57	32	26			8
29	(Singapore) Sean Hudspeth	(Germany) Tresor Attempto Racing			43	29	28			8
30	(Estonia) Ralf Aron (Saudi Arabia) Reema Juffali (Switzerland) Alain Valente	(Saudi Arabia) Theeba Motorsport	38	43†	52	60†	Ret	29	36	6
30	(Finland) Jesse Krohn	(Belgium) Team WRT							29	6
31	(United Kingdom) Ben Green	(Germany) Walkenhorst Motorsport							30	4
32	(New Zealand) Earl Bamber (Australia) Brenton Grove (Australia) Stephen Grove (Australia) Anton de Pasquale	(Australia) Grove Racing			48	28	45			4
33	(France) Doriane Pin	(Italy) Iron Dames			42	Ret	Ret			2
34	(Germany) Patrick Assenheimer (Germany) Florian Scholze	(Germany) GetSpeed	Ret	Ret	54	40	32	50†	45†	2
35	(Australia) Alex Peroni	(Germany) GetSpeed	Ret	Ret	54	40	32	50†		2
35	(Germany) Kenneth Heyer	(Germany) GetSpeed			54	40	32			2
35	(United Kingdom) Kiern Jewiss (United Kingdom) Derek Pierce	(United Kingdom) Team Parker Racing	34	30	49	33	33	45		2
36	(United Kingdom) Andy Meyrick	(United Kingdom) Team Parker Racing		30	49	33	33	45		2
36	(United Kingdom) Bailey Voisin	(Germany) Walkenhorst Motorsport			45	31	46†			1
37	(Netherlands) Xavier Maassen	(United Kingdom) Team Parker Racing			49	33	33			1
-	(New Zealand) Jaxon Evans	(United Kingdom) Team Parker Racing	34							0
-	(France) Arthur Rougier	(France) CSA Racing	37^{F}	38^{F}					38	0
-	(France) Erwin Creed	(France) CSA Racing	37^{F}	38^{F}						0
-	(Poland) Igor Waliłko	(France) CSA Racing	37^{F}							0
-	(Switzerland) Lucas Légeret	(France) CSA Racing		38^{F}						0
-	(France) Alexandre Cougnaud (France) Arnold Robin	(France) CSA Racing							38	0
-	(Switzerland) Yannick Mettler	(Saudi Arabia) Theeba Motorsport			52	60†	Ret			0
-	(Austria) Christopher Zöchling	(Italy) Dinamic GT Huber Racing			44	38	48†			0
-	(Austria) Christopher Zöchling	(Germany) Tresor Attempto Racing							42	0
-	(Brazil) Adalberto Baptista (Brazil) Bruno Baptista (Brazil) Rodrigo Baptista	(France) AKKodis ASP Team		40†	58	45	Ret		43	0
-	(Brazil) Alan Hellmeister	(France) AKKodis ASP Team			58	45	Ret			0
-	(United Kingdom) Simon Mann (Belgium) Ulysse de Pauw (France) Julien Piguet (Argentina) Nicolás Varrone	(Italy) AF Corse			55	55	43			0
-	(Austria) Lucas Auer	(Germany) GetSpeed							45†	0
-	(United States) Brendan Iribe (United Kingdom) Ollie Millroy (Spain) Fran Rueda (Denmark) Frederik Schandorff	(United States) Inception Racing			Ret	Ret	Ret			0
Pos.	Drivers	Team	MNZ (Italy)	LEC (France)	SPA (Belgium)			NÜR (Germany)	BAR (Spain)	Points
Pos.	Drivers	Team	MNZ (Italy)	LEC (France)	6hrs	12hrs	24hrs	NÜR (Germany)	BAR (Spain)	Points

==== Pro-Am Cup ====
Pos.	Drivers	Team	MNZ (Italy)	LEC (France)	SPA (Belgium)			NÜR (Germany)	BAR (Spain)	Points
Pos.	Drivers	Team	MNZ (Italy)	LEC (France)	6hrs	12hrs	24hrs	NÜR (Germany)	BAR (Spain)	Points
1	(Switzerland) Alex Fontana (Switzerland) Ivan Jacoma (Switzerland) Nicolas Leutwiler	(Germany) Car Collection Motorsport	Ret	31^{F}	35	36	23	42	41	102
2	(United Kingdom) Rob Collard (Denmark) Dennis Lind	(United Kingdom) Barwell Motorsport	30^{F}	Ret^{P}	64	Ret	Ret^{P}	32^{PF}	37	72
3	(Canada) Samantha Tan (Spain) Isaac Tutumlu	(Germany) ST Racing with Rinaldi	Ret	32	63	61†	Ret	43	32^{PF}	69
4	(Poland) Andrzej Lewandowski (United Kingdom) Aaron Walker	(Germany) GetSpeed	42	37	60	Ret	Ret	44	40	60
5	(Germany) Adam Osieka	(United States) SunEnergy1 Racing			53	39	22^{F}			52
5	(Germany) Adam Osieka	(Germany) GetSpeed							40	52
6	(United States) Lance Bergstein	(Germany) GetSpeed	42	37	60	Ret	Ret	44		45
7	(United Kingdom) Adam Balon	(United Kingdom) Barwell Motorsport	30^{F}	Ret^{P}					37	44
8	(United States) Jon Miller	(Germany) ST Racing with Rinaldi	Ret	32	63	61†	Ret	43		43
9	(Germany) Nico Menzel	(Germany) Car Collection Motorsport			35	36	23			39
10	(Netherlands) Nicky Catsburg (Austria) Martin Konrad (Australia) Chaz Mostert	(United States) SunEnergy1 Racing			53	39	22^{F}			37
10	(France) Erwin Creed (France) Arthur Rougier	(France) CSA Racing			37	35	35	Ret		36
11	(Belgium) Jean Glorieux (United Kingdom) Casper Stevenson	(France) CSA Racing			37	35	35			36
12	(United Kingdom) Lorcan Hanafin	(Germany) ST Racing with Rinaldi							32^{PF}	26
13	(United States) Colin Braun (Brazil) Felipe Fraga (United Kingdom) Ian James (United States) George Kurtz	(United States) CrowdStrike Racing by Riley			40	44	41			21
14	(Italy) Marco Cassarà (Italy) Stefano Comandini (Italy) Francesco Guerra	(Italy) BMW Italia Ceccato Racing	32^{P}							19
15	(France) Dorian Boccolacci (France) Emil Caumes (France) Stéphane Denoual	(France) CLRT		35						19
16	(Hong Kong) Adderly Fong (China) Xiaole He (China) Junlin Pan (China) "Rio"	(China) Uno Racing Team			59	49	37			18
17	(Switzerland) Mathias Beche (Canada) John Shen (Denmark) Benny Simonsen (Netherlands) Francis Tjia	(Hong Kong) Modena Motorsports			66	50	36			15
18	(United Kingdom) Matt Bell (United Kingdom) Frank Bird (United Kingdom) James Cottingham (United States) Naveen Rao	(Germany) Haupt Racing Team			50	47	Ret			11
19	(Germany) Leonard Weiss	(Germany) ST Racing with Rinaldi			63	61†	Ret			4
20	(United Kingdom) Lewis Williamson	(Germany) GetSpeed			60	Ret	Ret			3
21	(Finland) Patrick Kujala (United Arab Emirates) Bashar Mardini	(United Kingdom) Barwell Motorsport			64	Ret	Ret^{P}			2
22	(United States) Jean-Francois Brunot (New Zealand) Brendon Leitch (China) Kerong Li (United States) Gerhard Watzinger	(Germany) CrowdStrike Racing by Leipert Motorsport			68	64†	Ret			1
-	(Netherlands) Jeroen Bleekemolen (United States) Patrick Long (United States) James Sofronas (United States) Kyle Washington	(United States) GMG Racing by Car Collection Motorsport			Ret	Ret	Ret			-
-	(Australia) Kenny Habul	(United States) SunEnergy1 Racing			WD	WD	WD			-
Pos.	Drivers	Team	MNZ (Italy)	LEC (France)	SPA (Belgium)			NÜR (Germany)	BAR (Spain)	Points
Pos.	Drivers	Team	MNZ (Italy)	LEC (France)	6hrs	12hrs	24hrs	NÜR (Germany)	BAR (Spain)	Points

== See also ==
- 2023 British GT Championship
- 2023 GT World Challenge Europe
- 2023 GT World Challenge Europe Sprint Cup
- 2023 GT World Challenge Asia
- 2023 GT World Challenge America
- 2023 GT World Challenge Australia
- 2023 Intercontinental GT Challenge
