= 2018 GT4 Belgium Cup =

The 2018 GT4 Belgium Cup was the first season of the GT4 Belgium Cup, a sports car championship for Belgian drivers only, created and organised by the Stéphane Ratel Organisation (SRO). The season began on 7 April at Zolder and ended on 7 October at Zandvoort.

== Calendar ==
On 15 December 2017, the Stéphane Ratel Organisation announced the first draft of the 2018 calendar. The finalised calendar was announced on 30 March 2017. The round at the Nürburgring in the weekend of 1 July was dropped from the schedule.

Round	Circuit	Date	Supporting
1	Circuit Zolder, Heusden-Zolder, Belgium	7–8 April	Blancpain GT Series Sprint Cup
2	Circuit de Spa-Francorchamps, Stavelot, Belgium	21–22 July	SRO Speedweek
3	Nürburgring, Nürburg, Germany	15–16 September	Blancpain GT Series Sprint Cup
4	Circuit Zandvoort, Zandvoort, Netherlands	6–7 October	Standalone event

Also part of the GT4 European Series
Also part of the GT4 Central European Cup

== Entry list ==
All drivers are entered under Belgian license.

Team	Car	No.	Drivers	Class	Rounds
(Netherlands) Las Moras Racing by Equipe Verschuur	McLaren 570S GT4	11	Sven Van Laere	Am	1
(Belgium) Selleslagh Racing Team	Mercedes-AMG GT4	30	Nicolas Vandierendonck	Am	All
(Belgium) Selleslagh Racing Team	Mercedes-AMG GT4	30	Johan Vannerum	Am	1–3
(Belgium) Selleslagh Racing Team	Mercedes-AMG GT4	31	Sam Dejonghe	S	1–2
(Belgium) Selleslagh Racing Team	Mercedes-AMG GT4	31	Gregory Eyckmans	S	1
(Belgium) Selleslagh Racing Team	Mercedes-AMG GT4	31	Gilles Magnus	S	3
(Belgium) Selleslagh Racing Team	Mercedes-AMG GT4	31	Louis-Philippe Soenen	Am	4
(Belgium) Selleslagh Racing Team	Mercedes-AMG GT4	32	Louis-Philippe Soenen	Am	1–3
(France) 3Y Technology	BMW M4 GT4	37	Stéphane Lémeret	S	1–3
(France) 3Y Technology	BMW M4 GT4	38	Jamie Vandenbalck	PA	1–3
(Belgium) Motorsport98	Ford Mustang GT4	98	Eric De Doncker	Am	3
(Belgium) Jac Motors	Audi R8 LMS GT4	100	Mathieu Detry	PA	3
(Belgium) Jac Motors	Audi R8 LMS GT4	100	Laurent Jaspers	PA	3

Icon	Class
S	Silver Cup
PA	Pro-Am Cup
Am	Am Cup

== See also ==
- 2018 GT4 European Series
- 2018 French GT4 Cup
- 2018 GT4 Central European Cup
