= 2018 GT4 European Series =

The 2018 GT4 European Series was the eleventh season of the GT4 European Series, a sports car championship created and organised by the Stéphane Ratel Organisation (SRO). The season began on 7 April at Zolder and ended on 16 September at the Nürburgring. It was the first season, after it was renamed from GT4 European Series Northern Cup to GT4 European Series.

== Calendar ==
At the annual press conference during the 2017 24 Hours of Spa on 28 July, the Stéphane Ratel Organisation announced the first draft of the 2018 calendar, in which Monza, Silverstone and Paul Ricard initially made an appearance. All three tracks were dropped from the schedule, when the finalised calendar was announced on 24 November 2017. The Red Bull Ring, the Slovakia Ring and Zandvoort did not return on the schedule, as Zolder, Spa-Francorchamps and the Hungaroring took their places.

Round	Circuit	Date	Supporting
1	Circuit Zolder, Heusden-Zolder, Belgium	7–8 April	Blancpain GT Series Sprint Cup
2	(United Kingdom) Brands Hatch, Kent, Great Britain	5–6 May	Blancpain GT Series Sprint Cup
3	Misano World Circuit Marco Simoncelli, Misano Adriatico, Italy	23–24 June	Blancpain GT Series Sprint Cup
4	Circuit de Spa-Francorchamps, Stavelot, Belgium	21–22 July	SRO Speedweek
5	Hungaroring, Mogyoród, Hungary	1–2 September	Blancpain GT Series Sprint Cup
6	Nürburgring, Nürburg, Germany	15–16 September	Blancpain GT Series Sprint Cup

== Partners ==
The GT4 European Series is supported by 5 sponsors. These are the tire manufacturer Pirelli, the lubricant specialist RAVENOL, the watch manufacturer CERTINA, Elf and Gullwing Racing Insurance.

== Entry list ==
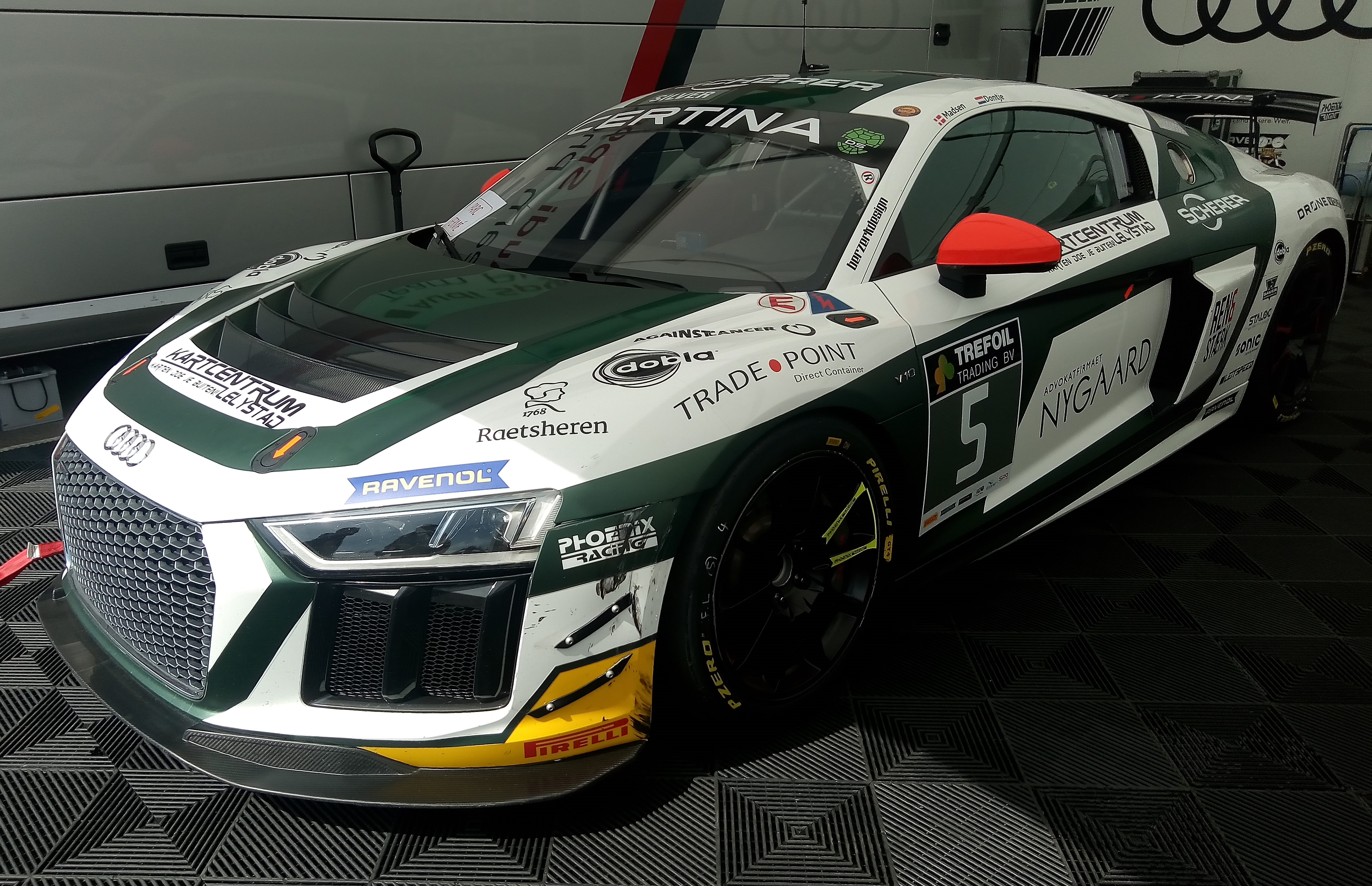
The Audi R8 LMS GT4 of Milan Dontje and Nicolaj Møller Madsen.

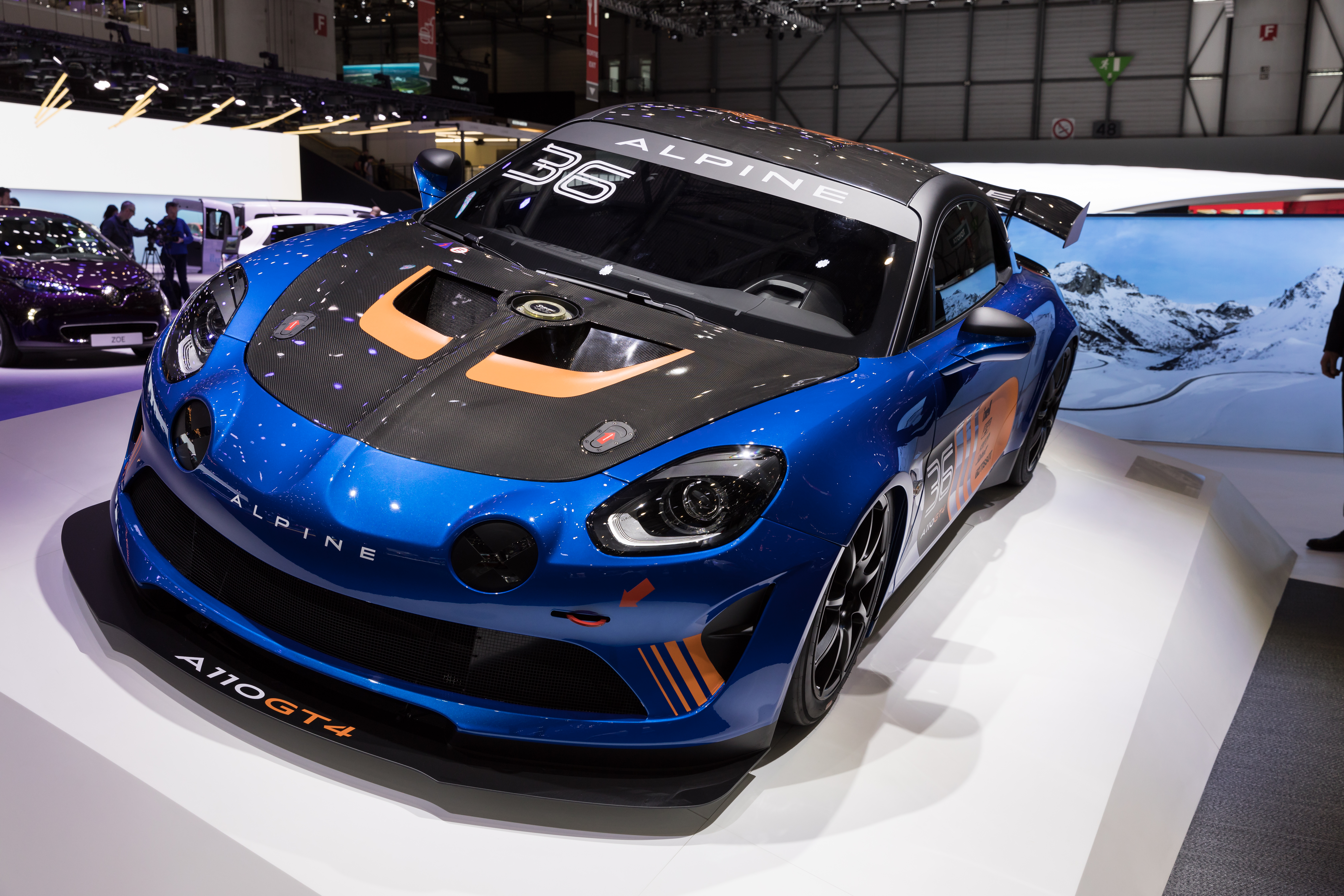
The Alpine A110 GT4, which made its debut in the GT4 European Series at Spa-Francorchamps.

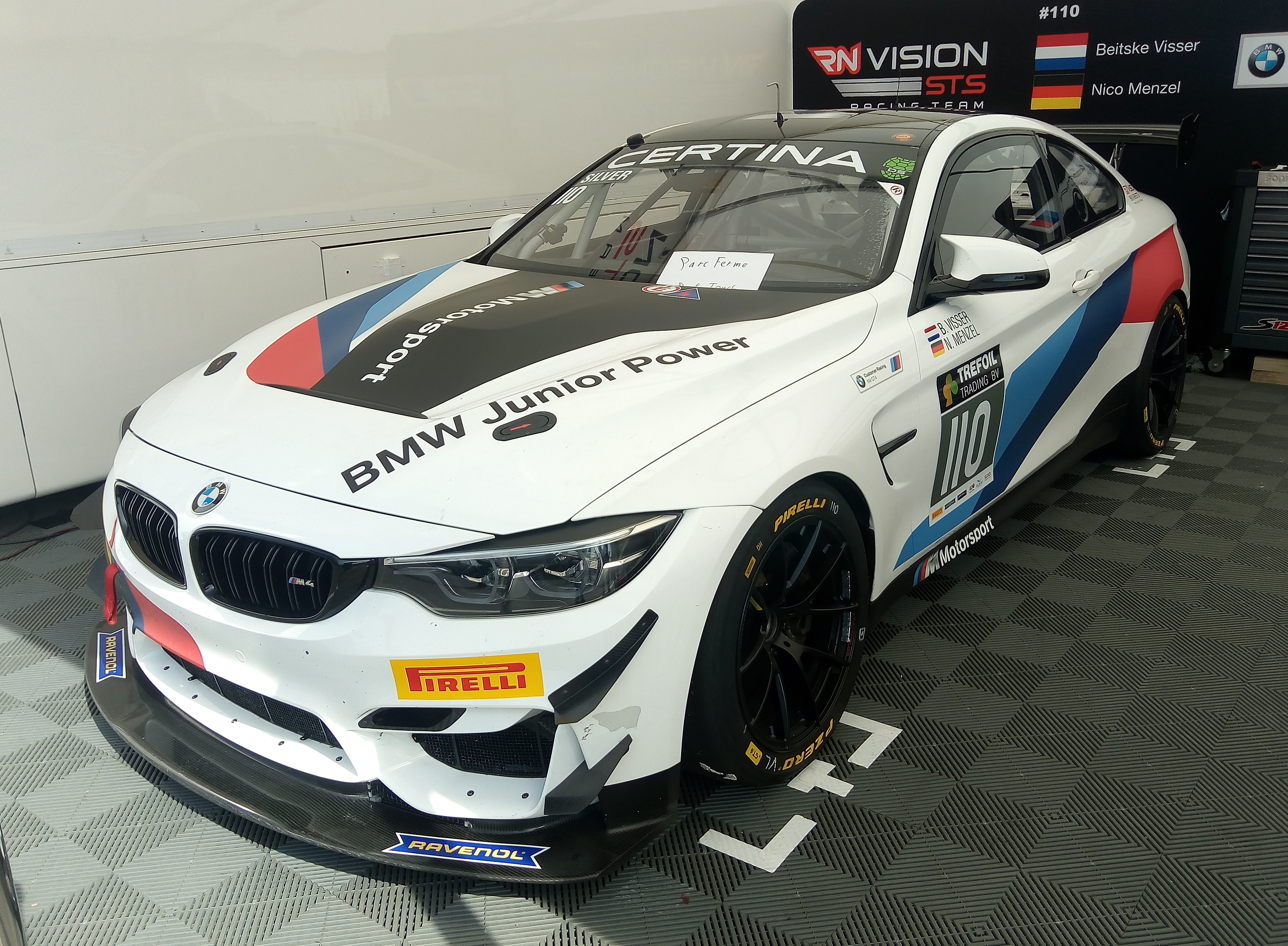
The BMW M4 GT4 as raced by Nico Menzel and Beitske Visser.

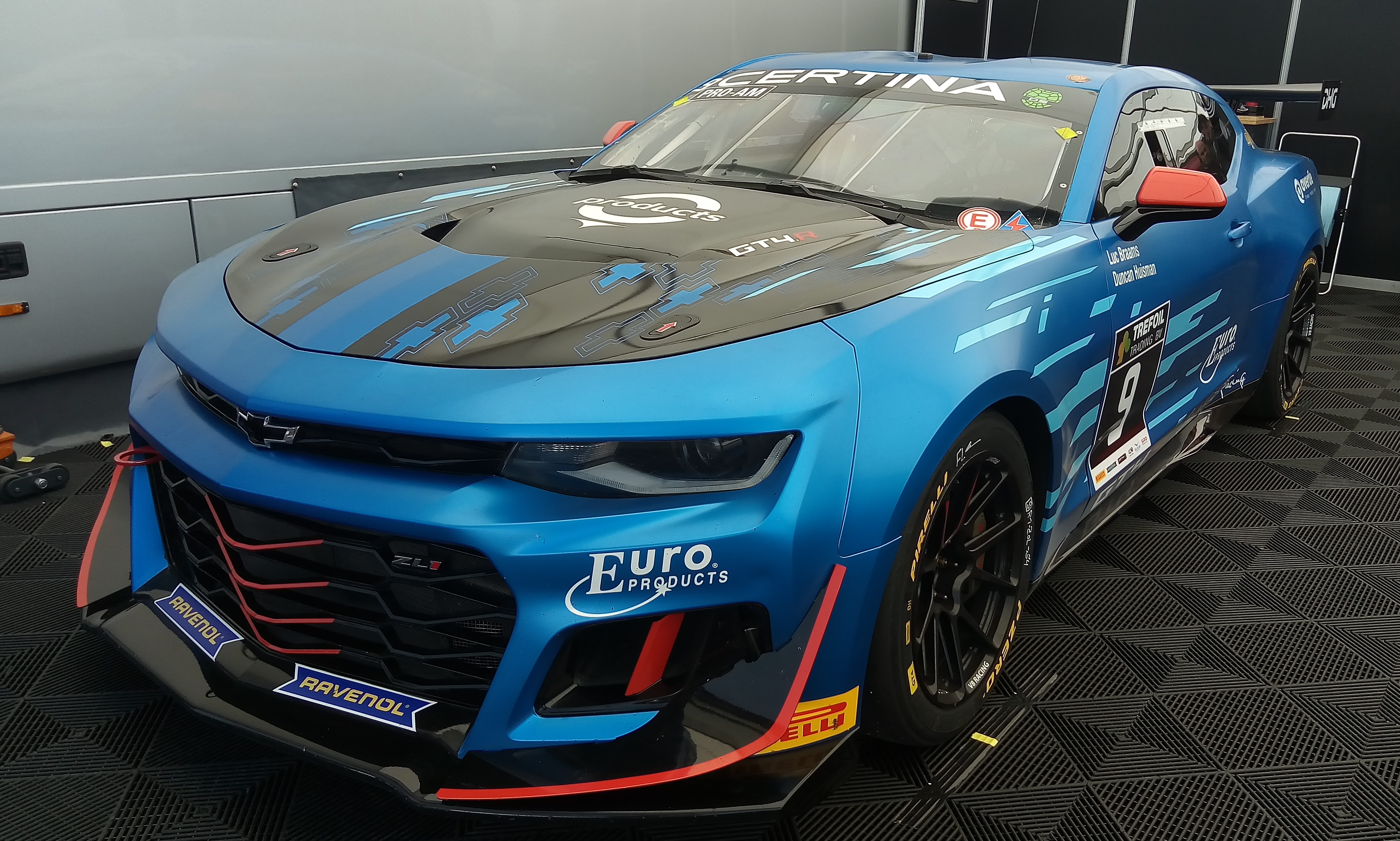
The Chevrolet Camaro GT4.R of Luc Braams and Duncan Huisman.

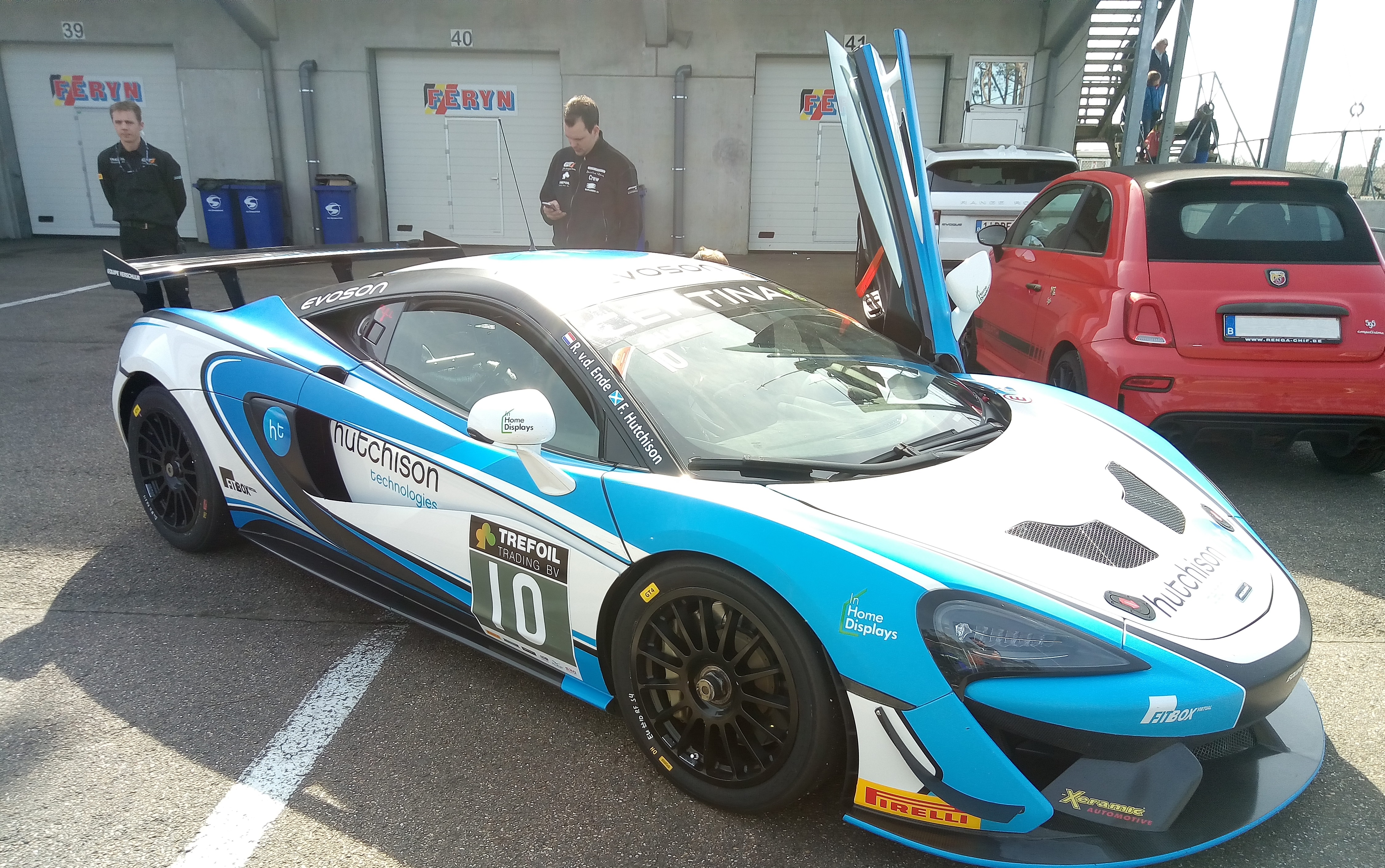
The McLaren 570S GT4 as raced by Ricardo van der Ende and Finlay Hutchison.

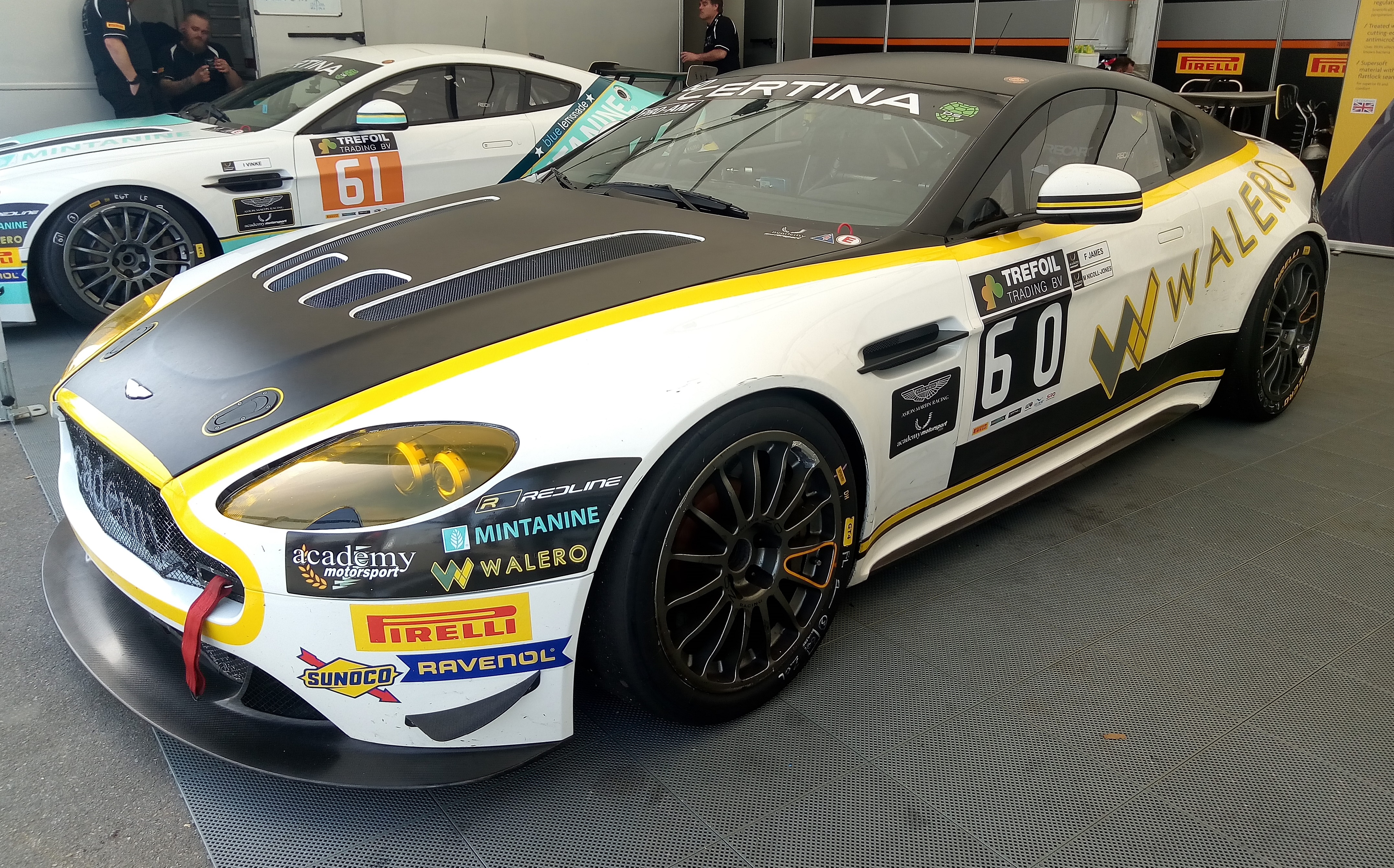
The Aston Martin Vantage GT4 as raced by Fiona James and Matt Nicoll-Jones.

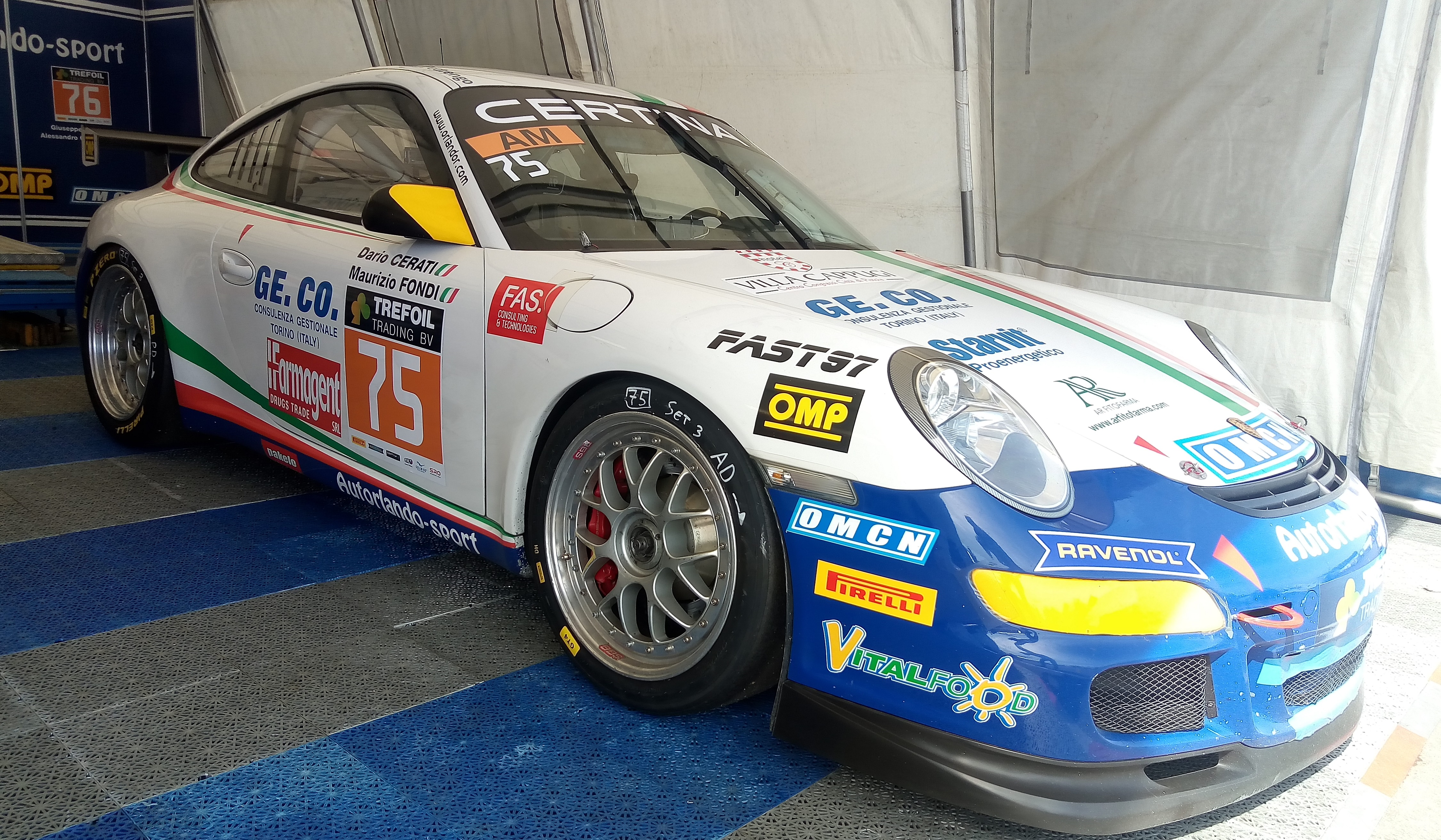
The Porsche 997 GT4 as raced by Dario Cerati and Maurizio Fondi.

Team	Car	No.	Drivers	Class	Rounds
(Netherlands) MDM Motorsport	BMW M4 GT4	1	(Netherlands) Simon Knap	S	All
(Netherlands) MDM Motorsport	BMW M4 GT4	1	(Netherlands) Max Koebolt	S	All
(Netherlands) MDM Motorsport	BMW M4 GT4	8	(Netherlands) Mark van der Aa	S	All
(Netherlands) MDM Motorsport	BMW M4 GT4	8	(Netherlands) Koen Bogaerts	S	All
(Germany) Leipert Motorsport	Mercedes-AMG GT4	2	(Spain) Iván Pareras	S	All
(Germany) Leipert Motorsport	Mercedes-AMG GT4	2	(Norway) Marcus Påverud	S	All
(Germany) Phoenix Racing	Audi R8 LMS GT4	3	(Switzerland) Cédric Freiburghaus	PA	All
(Germany) Phoenix Racing	Audi R8 LMS GT4	3	(Poland) Gosia Rdest	PA	All
(Germany) Phoenix Racing	Audi R8 LMS GT4	4	(Germany) Georg Bernsteiner	Am	1
(Germany) Phoenix Racing	Audi R8 LMS GT4	4	(Germany) Helmut Rödig	Am	1
(Germany) Phoenix Racing	Audi R8 LMS GT4	4	(Germany) Helmut Rödig	PA	2–3
(Germany) Phoenix Racing	Audi R8 LMS GT4	4	(Austria) Christopher Zöchling	PA	2–3
(Germany) Phoenix Racing	Audi R8 LMS GT4	5	(Netherlands) Milan Dontje	S	All
(Germany) Phoenix Racing	Audi R8 LMS GT4	5	(Denmark) Nicolaj Møller Madsen	S	All
(Germany) Phoenix Racing	Audi R8 LMS GT4	6	(Germany) John-Louis Jasper	PA	All
(Germany) Phoenix Racing	Audi R8 LMS GT4	6	(Germany) Jörg Viebahn	PA	All
(Belgium) Street Art Racing	Aston Martin Vantage GT4	7	(Switzerland) Pascal Bachmann	PA	All
(Belgium) Street Art Racing	Aston Martin Vantage GT4	7	(France) Julien Darras	PA	All
(Netherlands) V8 Racing	Chevrolet Camaro GT4.R	9	(Netherlands) Luc Braams	PA	1–4, 6
(Netherlands) V8 Racing	Chevrolet Camaro GT4.R	9	(Netherlands) Duncan Huisman	PA	1–4, 6
(Netherlands) V8 Racing	Chevrolet Camaro GT4.R	9	(Netherlands) Duncan Huisman	S	5
(Netherlands) V8 Racing	Chevrolet Camaro GT4.R	9	(United Kingdom) Finlay Hutchison	S	5
(Netherlands) V8 Racing	Chevrolet Camaro GT4.R	18	(Netherlands) Wolf Nathan	PA	All
(Netherlands) V8 Racing	Chevrolet Camaro GT4.R	18	(Netherlands) Jelle Beelen	PA	1–2
(Netherlands) V8 Racing	Chevrolet Camaro GT4.R	18	(Italy) Nicky Pastorelli	PA	3–4
(Netherlands) V8 Racing	Chevrolet Camaro GT4.R	18	(South Africa) Jordan Grogor	PA	5–6
(Netherlands) / Equipe Verschuur (Note: Car No. 10 entered as Equipe Verschuur and car No. 11 entered as Las Moras Racing by Equipe Verschuur.); (Netherlands) / Las Moras Racing by Equipe Verschuur	McLaren 570S GT4	10	(Netherlands) Ricardo van der Ende	S	All
(Netherlands) / Equipe Verschuur; (Netherlands) / Las Moras Racing by Equipe Verschuur	McLaren 570S GT4	10	(United Kingdom) Finlay Hutchison	S	All
(Netherlands) / Equipe Verschuur; (Netherlands) / Las Moras Racing by Equipe Verschuur	McLaren 570S GT4	11	(Netherlands) Liesette Braams	Am	All
(Netherlands) / Equipe Verschuur; (Netherlands) / Las Moras Racing by Equipe Verschuur	McLaren 570S GT4	11	(Belgium) Sven Van Laere	Am	1–2
(Netherlands) / Equipe Verschuur; (Netherlands) / Las Moras Racing by Equipe Verschuur	McLaren 570S GT4	11	(Netherlands) Luc Braams	Am	5
(Turkey) Borusan Otomotiv Motorsport	BMW M4 GT4	12	(Turkey) Yağız Gedik	S	All
(Turkey) Borusan Otomotiv Motorsport	BMW M4 GT4	12	(Turkey) Ali Türkkan	S	All
(Germany) Schwede Motorsport	Porsche Cayman GT4 Clubsport MR	13	(Germany) Marc Basseng	PA	All
(Germany) Schwede Motorsport	Porsche Cayman GT4 Clubsport MR	13	(Germany) Phillip Bethke	PA	All
(Germany) Schwede Motorsport	Porsche Cayman GT4 Clubsport MR	15	(Germany) Dominik Schraml	PA	1–5
(Germany) Schwede Motorsport	Porsche Cayman GT4 Clubsport MR	15	(Germany) Rudolf Schulte	PA	1–5
(Poland) eSky WP Racing Team	Maserati GranTurismo MC GT4	14	(Poland) Łukasz Kręski	Am	3
(Poland) eSky WP Racing Team	Maserati GranTurismo MC GT4	14	(Poland) Maciej Marcinkiewicz	Am	3
(Germany) Racing One	Audi R8 LMS GT4	16	(Germany) Hamza Owega	PA	1–5
(Germany) Racing One	Audi R8 LMS GT4	16	(Germany) Markus Lungstrass	PA	1–4
(Germany) Racing One	Audi R8 LMS GT4	16	(Portugal) Francisco Guedes	PA	5
(Germany) Racing One	Audi R8 LMS GT4	16	(Germany) Ronny C'Rock	PA	6
(Germany) Racing One	Audi R8 LMS GT4	16	(Germany) Kevin Strohschänk	PA	6
(Germany) Racing One	Audi R8 LMS GT4	77	(Hungary) Csaba Mór	PA	1–4
(Germany) Racing One	Audi R8 LMS GT4	77	(Italy) Patrick Zamparini	PA	1–4
(Germany) Racing One	Audi R8 LMS GT4	77	(Germany) Markus Lungstrass	PA	5–6
(Germany) Racing One	Audi R8 LMS GT4	77	(Netherlands) Jules Szymkowiak	PA	5–6
(Sweden) Ricknäs Motorsport	Porsche Cayman GT4 Clubsport MR	21	(Sweden) Håkan Ricknäs	Am	4
(Sweden) Ricknäs Motorsport	Porsche Cayman GT4 Clubsport MR	21	(Sweden) Fredrik Ros	Am	4
(Austria) True Racing (Note: Cars No. 22 and 23 entered as True Racing and car No. 24 entered as Felbermayr - Reiter. True Racing was entered under German licence and run by Reiter Engineering at Rounds 1 and 2, but was entered under Austrian licence as its own team from Round 3.) (Germany) Felbermayr - Reiter	KTM X-Bow GT4	22	(Austria) Reinhard Kofler	S	All
(Austria) True Racing (Germany) Felbermayr - Reiter	KTM X-Bow GT4	22	(Austria) Laura Kraihamer	S	1–2
(Austria) True Racing (Germany) Felbermayr - Reiter	KTM X-Bow GT4	22	(Austria) Ferdinand Stuck	S	3–6
(Austria) True Racing (Germany) Felbermayr - Reiter	KTM X-Bow GT4	23	(Austria) Eike Angermayr	S	All
(Austria) True Racing (Germany) Felbermayr - Reiter	KTM X-Bow GT4	23	(Netherlands) Stéphane Kox	S	1–2
(Austria) True Racing (Germany) Felbermayr - Reiter	KTM X-Bow GT4	23	(Austria) Laura Kraihamer	S	3–6
(Austria) True Racing (Germany) Felbermayr - Reiter	KTM X-Bow GT4	24	(Austria) Gottfried Pilz	S	1–5
(Austria) True Racing (Germany) Felbermayr - Reiter	KTM X-Bow GT4	24	(Poland) Maciej Dreszer	S	1–4
(Austria) True Racing (Germany) Felbermayr - Reiter	KTM X-Bow GT4	24	(Norway) Mads Siljehaug	S	5
(Austria) True Racing (Germany) Felbermayr - Reiter	KTM X-Bow GT4	24	(Austria) Horst Felbermayr Jr.	PA	6
(Austria) True Racing (Germany) Felbermayr - Reiter	KTM X-Bow GT4	24	(Austria) Gottfried Pilz	PA	6
(France) CMR	Ginetta G55 GT4	26	(France) David Loger	Am	1–3
(France) CMR	Ginetta G55 GT4	26	(Monaco) Eric Mouez	Am	1–3
(France) CMR	Alpine A110 GT4	27	(France) David Loger	Am	All
(France) CMR	Alpine A110 GT4	27	(Monaco) Eric Mouez	Am	All
(France) CMR	Alpine A110 GT4	35	(France) Pierre-Alexandre Jean	S	4–6
(France) CMR	Alpine A110 GT4	35	(France) Stéphane Tribaudini	S	4–5
(France) CMR	Alpine A110 GT4	35	(France) Gaël Castelli	S	6
(France) CMR	Ginetta G55 GT4	36	(France) Pierre-Alexandre Jean	S	1–3
(France) CMR	Ginetta G55 GT4	36	(France) Stéphane Tribaudini	S	1–3
(Belgium) Selleslagh Racing Team	Mercedes-AMG GT4	30	(Belgium) Nicolas Vandierendonck	Am	All
(Belgium) Selleslagh Racing Team	Mercedes-AMG GT4	30	(Belgium) Johan Vannerum	Am	All
(Belgium) Selleslagh Racing Team	Mercedes-AMG GT4	31	(Belgium) Sam Dejonghe	S	1, 4
(Belgium) Selleslagh Racing Team	Mercedes-AMG GT4	31	(Belgium) Gregory Eyckmans	S	1
(Belgium) Selleslagh Racing Team	Mercedes-AMG GT4	31	(Netherlands) Bas Schouten	S	2–4, 6
(Belgium) Selleslagh Racing Team	Mercedes-AMG GT4	31	(Belgium) Ward Sluys	S	2
(Belgium) Selleslagh Racing Team	Mercedes-AMG GT4	31	(Netherlands) Bob Herber	S	3
(Belgium) Selleslagh Racing Team	Mercedes-AMG GT4	31	(Belgium) Gilles Magnus	S	6
(Belgium) Selleslagh Racing Team	Mercedes-AMG GT4	31	(Hungary) Csaba Mór	PA	5
(Belgium) Selleslagh Racing Team	Mercedes-AMG GT4	31	(Italy) Patrick Zamparini	PA	5
(Belgium) Selleslagh Racing Team	Mercedes-AMG GT4	32	(Belgium) Louis-Philippe Soenen	Am	All
(Spain) Bullitt Racing	Mercedes-AMG GT4	33	(United Kingdom) Stephen Pattrick	PA	1–5
(Spain) Bullitt Racing	Mercedes-AMG GT4	33	(United Kingdom) Andy Meyrick	PA	1–4
(Spain) Bullitt Racing	Mercedes-AMG GT4	33	(United Kingdom) Seb Morris	PA	5
(United Arab Emirates) 3Y Technology	BMW M4 GT4	37	(Belgium) Stéphane Lémeret	S	All
(United Arab Emirates) 3Y Technology	BMW M4 GT4	37	(India) Akhil Rabindra	S	All
(United Arab Emirates) 3Y Technology	BMW M4 GT4	38	(Brazil) Luiz Floss	PA	All
(United Arab Emirates) 3Y Technology	BMW M4 GT4	38	(Belgium) Jamie Vandenbalck	PA	1–2, 4–6
(United Arab Emirates) 3Y Technology	BMW M4 GT4	38	(Italy) Beniamino Caccia	PA	3
(United Arab Emirates) 3Y Technology	BMW M4 GT4	39	(France) Sylvain Debs	Am	All
(United Arab Emirates) 3Y Technology	BMW M4 GT4	39	(France) Gwenaël Delomier	Am	All
(Germany) Allied-Racing	Porsche Cayman GT4 Clubsport MR	42	(Austria) Nicolas Schöll	Am	All
(Germany) Allied-Racing	Porsche Cayman GT4 Clubsport MR	42	(Germany) Joachim Bölting	Am	1–4
(Germany) Allied-Racing	Porsche Cayman GT4 Clubsport MR	43	(Germany) Hendrik Still	PA	1–4
(Germany) Allied-Racing	Porsche Cayman GT4 Clubsport MR	43	(Germany) Jan Kasperlik	PA	1, 3–6
(Germany) Allied-Racing	Porsche Cayman GT4 Clubsport MR	43	(United Kingdom) JM Littman	PA	2
(Germany) Allied-Racing	Porsche Cayman GT4 Clubsport MR	43	(Finland) Henri Kauppi	PA	5
(Germany) Allied-Racing	Porsche Cayman GT4 Clubsport MR	43	(Hungary) Csaba Mór	PA	6
(Austria) Lechner Racing	Mercedes-AMG GT4	47	(Austria) Florian Janits	S	All
(Austria) Lechner Racing	Mercedes-AMG GT4	47	(Austria) Jakob Schober	S	All
(United Kingdom) HHC Motorsport	Ginetta G55 GT4	50	(United Kingdom) Will Burns	PA	2
(United Kingdom) HHC Motorsport	Ginetta G55 GT4	50	(United Kingdom) Mike Newbould	PA	2
(United Kingdom) HHC Motorsport	Ginetta G55 GT4	55	(United Kingdom) Stuart Middleton	S	All
(United Kingdom) HHC Motorsport	Ginetta G55 GT4	55	(United Kingdom) Will Tregurtha	S	All
(Sweden) Primus Racing	Ginetta G55 GT4	51	(Denmark) Peter Larsen	Am	4
(Sweden) Primus Racing	Ginetta G55 GT4	51	(Sweden) Johan Rosén	Am	4
(United Kingdom) Tolman Motorsport	McLaren 570S GT4	56	(United Kingdom) Joe Osborne	PA	2
(United Kingdom) Tolman Motorsport	McLaren 570S GT4	56	(United Kingdom) David Pattison	PA	2
(United Kingdom) Academy Motorsport	Aston Martin Vantage GT4	60	(United Kingdom) Fiona James	PA	All
(United Kingdom) Academy Motorsport	Aston Martin Vantage GT4	60	(United Kingdom) Matt Nicoll-Jones	PA	All
(United Kingdom) Academy Motorsport	Aston Martin Vantage GT4	61	(Germany) Immanuel Vinke	Am	1
(United Kingdom) Academy Motorsport	Aston Martin Vantage GT4	61	(Denmark) Jan Jønck	S	2
(United Kingdom) Academy Motorsport	Aston Martin Vantage GT4	61	(Sweden) Dennis Strandberg	S	2
(Belgium) Mühlner Motorsport	Porsche Cayman GT4 Clubsport MR	69	(Germany) Moritz Kranz	Am	4
(San Marino) W & D Racing Team	BMW M4 GT4	71	(San Marino) Paolo Meloni	PA	All
(San Marino) W & D Racing Team	BMW M4 GT4	71	(Italy) Massimiliano Tresoldi	PA	All
(Italy) Autorlando Sport	Porsche 997 GT4	75	(Italy) Dario Cerati	Am	All
(Italy) Autorlando Sport	Porsche 997 GT4	75	(Italy) Maurizio Fondi	Am	All
(Italy) Autorlando Sport	Porsche 997 GT4	76	(Italy) Giuseppe Ghezzi	Am	All
(Italy) Autorlando Sport	Porsche 997 GT4	76	(Italy) Alessandro Giovanelli	Am	All
(Germany) Team GT	McLaren 570S GT4	87	(United Kingdom) Paul Rees	S	All
(Germany) Team GT	McLaren 570S GT4	87	(Switzerland) Nico Rindlisbacher	S	All
(Germany) Team GT	McLaren 570S GT4	88	(Germany) Felix von der Laden	PA	1, 3
(Germany) Team GT	McLaren 570S GT4	88	(Germany) Bernhard Laber	PA	1
(Germany) Team GT	McLaren 570S GT4	88	(Switzerland) Alain Valente	PA	3
(Germany) Team GT	McLaren 570S GT4	88	(Germany) Felix von der Laden	Am	2, 4–6
(Germany) Team GT	McLaren 570S GT4	88	(Germany) Christian Danner	Am	2
(Germany) Team GT	McLaren 570S GT4	88	(Germany) Bernhard Laber	Am	4–6
(Germany) Team GT	McLaren 570S GT4	89	(Monaco) Micah Stanley	PA	5
(Germany) Team GT	McLaren 570S GT4	89	(Switzerland) Alain Valente	PA	5
(Sweden) Lestrup Racing Team	BMW M4 GT4	97	(Sweden) Joakim Söderström	PA	4–6
(Sweden) Lestrup Racing Team	BMW M4 GT4	97	(Sweden) Oliver Söderström	PA	4–6
(Belgium) Motorsport98	Ford Mustang GT4	98	(Belgium) Eric De Doncker	Am	6
(Germany) HP Racing	Mercedes-AMG GT4	99	(Austria) Sascha Halek	PA	5
(Germany) HP Racing	Mercedes-AMG GT4	99	(Switzerland) Wolfgang Risch	PA	5
(Belgium) Jac Motors	Audi R8 LMS GT4	100	(Belgium) Mathieu Detry	PA	6
(Belgium) Jac Motors	Audi R8 LMS GT4	100	(Belgium) Laurent Jaspers	PA	6
(Germany) PROsport Performance	Porsche Cayman PRO4 GT4	103	(Germany) Max Hesse	S	4
(Germany) PROsport Performance	Porsche Cayman PRO4 GT4	103	(Germany) Mike David Ortmann	S	4
(Germany) PROsport Performance	Porsche Cayman PRO4 GT4	103	(Argentina) Valentín Aguirre	S	6
(Germany) PROsport Performance	Porsche Cayman PRO4 GT4	103	(Germany) Andreas Patzelt	S	6
(Germany) PROsport Performance	Porsche Cayman PRO4 GT4	104	(Germany) Alexander Mies	S	6
(Germany) PROsport Performance	Porsche Cayman PRO4 GT4	104	(Germany) Mike David Ortmann	S	6
(Germany) RN Vision STS	BMW M4 GT4	110	(Netherlands) Beitske Visser	S	All
(Germany) RN Vision STS	BMW M4 GT4	110	(Germany) Nico Menzel	S	1, 3–6
(Germany) RN Vision STS	BMW M4 GT4	110	(Germany) Dennis Marschall	S	2
(Germany) RN Vision STS	BMW M4 GT4	111	(Italy) Gabriele Piana	S	All
(Germany) RN Vision STS	BMW M4 GT4	111	(Romania) Petru Umbrărescu	S	All
(Germany) RN Vision STS	BMW M4 GT4	112	(Portugal) Miguel Cristóvão	PA	All
(Germany) RN Vision STS	BMW M4 GT4	112	(Bulgaria) Pavel Lefterov	PA	All
(United Kingdom) ERC Sport	Mercedes-AMG GT4	116	(Germany) Katarina Kyvalova	Am	4
(United Kingdom) ERC Sport	Mercedes-AMG GT4	116	(Norway) Egidio Perfetti	Am	4
(France) (Switzerland) / TFT Racing (Note: The team entered as TFT Racing at Rounds 1 and 2 and entered as Porsche Zentrum Oberer Zürichsee by TFT Racing from Round 3.); (France) (Switzerland) / Porsche Zentrum Oberer Zürichsee by TFT Racing	Porsche Cayman GT4 Clubsport MR	222	(Switzerland) Niki Leutwiler	Am	All

Icon	Class
S	Silver Cup
PA	Pro-Am Cup
Am	Am Cup

== Race results ==
Bold indicates overall winner.

Round		Circuit	Pole position	Silver Winners	Pro-Am Winners	Am Winners
1	R1	(Belgium) Zolder	(Germany) No. 5 Phoenix Racing	**(Germany) No. 5 Phoenix Racing**	(Germany) No. 13 Schwede Motorsport	(Belgium) No. 30 Selleslagh Racing Team
1	R1	(Belgium) Zolder	(Netherlands) Milan Dontje (Denmark) Nicolaj Møller Madsen	**(Netherlands) Milan Dontje** **(Denmark) Nicolaj Møller Madsen**	(Germany) Marc Basseng (Germany) Phillip Bethke	(Belgium) Nicolas Vandierendonck (Belgium) Johan Vannerum
1	R2	(Belgium) Zolder	(United Kingdom) No. 55 HHC Motorsport	**(United Kingdom) No. 55 HHC Motorsport**	(Germany) No. 77 Racing One	(France) No. 222 TFT Racing
1	R2	(Belgium) Zolder	(United Kingdom) Stuart Middleton (United Kingdom) Will Tregurtha	**(United Kingdom) Stuart Middleton** **(United Kingdom) Will Tregurtha**	(Hungary) Csaba Mór (Italy) Patrick Zamparini	(Switzerland) Niki Leutwiler
2	R1	(United Kingdom) Brands Hatch	(United Kingdom) No. 55 HHC Motorsport	**(Germany) No. 5 Phoenix Racing**	(Germany) No. 13 Schwede Motorsport	(Italy) No. 76 Autorlando Sport
2	R1	(United Kingdom) Brands Hatch	(United Kingdom) Stuart Middleton (United Kingdom) Will Tregurtha	**(Netherlands) Milan Dontje** **(Denmark) Nicolaj Møller Madsen**	(Germany) Marc Basseng (Germany) Phillip Bethke	(Italy) Giuseppe Ghezzi (Italy) Alessandro Giovanelli
2	R2	(United Kingdom) Brands Hatch	(United Kingdom) No. 55 HHC Motorsport	**(United Kingdom) No. 55 HHC Motorsport**	(Germany) No. 13 Schwede Motorsport	(Italy) No. 76 Autorlando Sport
2	R2	(United Kingdom) Brands Hatch	(United Kingdom) Stuart Middleton (United Kingdom) Will Tregurtha	**(United Kingdom) Stuart Middleton** **(United Kingdom) Will Tregurtha**	(Germany) Marc Basseng (Germany) Phillip Bethke	(Italy) Giuseppe Ghezzi (Italy) Alessandro Giovanelli
3	R1	(Italy) Misano	(Netherlands) No. 10 Equipe Verschuur	**(Germany) No. 111 RN Vision STS**	(Germany) No. 16 Racing One	(Italy) No. 76 Autorlando Sport
3	R1	(Italy) Misano	(Netherlands) Ricardo van der Ende (United Kingdom) Finlay Hutchison	**(Italy) Gabriele Piana** **(Romania) Petru Umbrărescu**	(Germany) Markus Lungstrass (Germany) Hamza Owega	(Italy) Giuseppe Ghezzi (Italy) Alessandro Giovanelli
3	R2	(Italy) Misano	(Germany) No. 5 Phoenix Racing	**(Netherlands) No. 10 Equipe Verschuur**	(Germany) No. 112 RN Vision STS	(Switzerland) No. 222 Porsche Zentrum; Oberer Zürichsee by TFT Racing
3	R2	(Italy) Misano	(Netherlands) Milan Dontje (Denmark) Nicolaj Møller Madsen	**(Netherlands) Ricardo van der Ende** **(United Kingdom) Finlay Hutchison**	(Portugal) Miguel Cristóvão (Bulgaria) Pavel Lefterov	(Switzerland) Niki Leutwiler
4	R1	(Belgium) Spa-Francorchamps	(United Kingdom) No. 55 HHC Motorsport	**(Germany) No. 5 Phoenix Racing**	(Germany) No. 16 Racing One	(Switzerland) No. 222 Porsche Zentrum; Oberer Zürichsee by TFT Racing
4	R1	(Belgium) Spa-Francorchamps	(United Kingdom) Stuart Middleton (United Kingdom) Will Tregurtha	**(Netherlands) Milan Dontje** **(Denmark) Nicolaj Møller Madsen**	(Germany) Markus Lungstrass (Germany) Hamza Owega	(Switzerland) Niki Leutwiler
4	R2	(Belgium) Spa-Francorchamps	(France) No. 35 CMR	**(France) No. 35 CMR**	(Spain) No. 33 Bullitt Racing	(Belgium) No. 69 Mühlner Motorsport
4	R2	(Belgium) Spa-Francorchamps	(France) Pierre-Alexandre Jean (France) Stéphane Tribaudini	**(France) Pierre-Alexandre Jean** **(France) Stéphane Tribaudini**	(United Kingdom) Andy Meyrick (United Kingdom) Stephen Pattrick	(Germany) Moritz Kranz
5	R1	(Hungary) Hungaroring	(Germany) No. 111 RN Vision STS	**(Netherlands) No. 1 MDM Motorsport**	(Germany) No. 77 Racing One	(Germany) No. 42 Allied-Racing
5	R1	(Hungary) Hungaroring	(Italy) Gabriele Piana (Romania) Petru Umbrărescu	**(Netherlands) Simon Knap** **(Netherlands) Max Koebolt**	(Germany) Markus Lungstrass (Netherlands) Jules Szymkowiak	(Austria) Nicolas Schöll
5	R2	(Hungary) Hungaroring	(Germany) No. 5 Phoenix Racing	**(Germany) No. 110 RN Vision STS**	(Germany) No. 77 Racing One	(Germany) No. 42 Allied-Racing
5	R2	(Hungary) Hungaroring	(Netherlands) Milan Dontje (Denmark) Nicolaj Møller Madsen	**(Germany) Nico Menzel** **(Netherlands) Beitske Visser**	(Germany) Markus Lungstrass (Netherlands) Jules Szymkowiak	(Austria) Nicolas Schöll
6	R1	(Germany) Nürburgring	(United Kingdom) No. 55 HHC Motorsport	**(Germany) No. 110 RN Vision STS**	(Germany) No. 77 Racing One	(Germany) No. 42 Allied-Racing
6	R1	(Germany) Nürburgring	(United Kingdom) Stuart Middleton (United Kingdom) Will Tregurtha	**(Germany) Nico Menzel** **(Netherlands) Beitske Visser**	(Germany) Markus Lungstrass (Netherlands) Jules Szymkowiak	(Austria) Nicolas Schöll
6	R2	(Germany) Nürburgring	(Netherlands) No. 10 Equipe Verschuur	**(Netherlands) No. 10 Equipe Verschuur**	(Germany) No. 77 Racing One	(Germany) No. 42 Allied-Racing
6	R2	(Germany) Nürburgring	(Netherlands) Ricardo van der Ende (United Kingdom) Finlay Hutchison	**(Netherlands) Ricardo van der Ende** **(United Kingdom) Finlay Hutchison**	(Germany) Markus Lungstrass (Netherlands) Jules Szymkowiak	(Austria) Nicolas Schöll

== Championship standings ==
Scoring system

Championship points were awarded for the first ten positions in each race. Entries were required to complete 75% of the winning car's race distance in order to be classified and earn points. Individual drivers were required to participate for a minimum of 25 minutes in order to earn championship points in any race.

Position	**1st**	**2nd**	**3rd**	**4th**	**5th**	**6th**	**7th**	**8th**	**9th**	**10th**
Points	25	18	15	12	10	8	6	4	2	1

=== Drivers' championship ===
Pos.	Driver	Team	ZOL (Belgium)		BRH (United Kingdom)		MIS (Italy)		SPA (Belgium)		HUN (Hungary)		NÜR (Germany)		Points
Silver class
1	(Netherlands) Milan Dontje (Denmark) Nicolaj Møller Madsen	(Germany) Phoenix Racing	**1**	5	1	5	25	**4**	1	Ret	11	**5**	6	5	143
2	(United Kingdom) Stuart Middleton (United Kingdom) Will Tregurtha	(United Kingdom) HHC Motorsport	2	**1**	**15**	**1**	2	5	**4**	2	Ret	10	**4**	Ret	143
3	(Netherlands) Simon Knap (Netherlands) Max Koebolt	(Netherlands) MDM Motorsport	4	6	2	2	5	9	6	3	1	7	5	Ret	143
4	(United Kingdom) Finlay Hutchison	(Netherlands) Equipe Verschuur	6	9	39	DNS	**20**	1	2	Ret	WD	WD	2	**1**	108
4	(United Kingdom) Finlay Hutchison	(Netherlands) V8 Racing									28	8			108
5	(Netherlands) Ricardo van der Ende	(Netherlands) Equipe Verschuur	6	9	39	DNS	**20**	1	2	Ret	WD	WD	2	**1**	102
6	(Netherlands) Beitske Visser	(Germany) RN Vision STS	7	7	31	6	Ret	7	29	Ret	13	1	1	2	100
7	(Italy) Gabriele Piana (Romania) Petru Umbrărescu	(Germany) RN Vision STS	19	21	32	10	1	2	8	10	**2**	2	10	9	98
8	(France) Pierre-Alexandre Jean	(France) CMR	3	4	7	7	7	Ret	3	**1**	32	38	9	Ret	96
9	(Germany) Nico Menzel	(Germany) RN Vision STS	7	7			Ret	7	29	Ret	13	1	1	2	92
10	(France) Stéphane Tribaudini	(France) CMR	3	4	7	7	7	Ret	3	**1**	32	38			92
11	(Austria) Reinhard Kofler	(Austria) True Racing	39	8	30	26	Ret	3	5	5	10	4	3	4	88
12	(Austria) Ferdinand Stuck	(Austria) True Racing					Ret	3	5	5	10	4	3	4	82
13	(Netherlands) Bas Schouten	(Belgium) Selleslagh Racing Team			6	4	Ret	16	Ret	4			11	3	49
14	(United Kingdom) Paul Rees (Switzerland) Nico Rindlisbacher	(Germany) Team GT	9	3	Ret	40	6	23	Ret	6	Ret	22	12	16	42
15	(Spain) Iván Pareras (Norway) Marcus Påverud	(Germany) Leipert Motorsport	5	36	36	3	31	6	15	9	17	40	21	17	42
16	(Netherlands) Mark van der Aa (Netherlands) Koen Bogaerts	(Netherlands) MDM Motorsport	17	11	3	24	35	18	31	16	9	15	39	15	31
17	(Austria) Gottfried Pilz	(Germany) Felbermayr - Reiter	23	24	Ret	Ret	23	20	27	35	4	3			28
18	(Belgium) Stéphane Lémeret (India) Akhil Rabindra	(United Arab Emirates) 3Y Technology	Ret	14	4	13	36	13	17	34	33	20	7	11	27
19	(Austria) Florian Janits (Austria) Jakob Schober	(Austria) Lechner Racing	38	19	10	8	22	Ret	Ret	Ret	3	17	13	Ret	24
20	(Belgium) Ward Sluys	(Belgium) Selleslagh Racing Team			6	4									20
21	(Austria) Laura Kraihamer	(Austria) True Racing	39	8	30	26	11	Ret	9	36	DNS	23	17	12	20
22	(Austria) Eike Angermayr	(Austria) True Racing	35	23	8	36	11	Ret	9	36	DNS	23	17	12	18
23	(Belgium) Sam Dejonghe	(Belgium) Selleslagh Racing Team	14	Ret					Ret	4					14
24	(Denmark) Jan Jønck (Sweden) Dennis Strandberg	(United Kingdom) Academy Motorsport			5	9									12
25	(Turkey) Yağız Gedik (Turkey) Ali Türkkan	(Turkey) Borusan Otomotiv Motorsport	40	22	28	12	13	25	16	14	22	27	24	14	10
26	(Germany) Dennis Marschall	(Germany) RN Vision STS			31	6									8
27	(Germany) Mike David Ortmann	(Germany) PROsport Performance							7	12			DSQ	DNS	8
27	(Germany) Max Hesse	(Germany) PROsport Performance							7	12					8
28	(Netherlands) Duncan Huisman	(Netherlands) V8 Racing									28	8			6
29	(Netherlands) Stéphane Kox	(Austria) True Racing	35	23	8	36									4
30	(Belgium) Gregory Eyckmans	(Belgium) Selleslagh Racing Team	14	Ret											2
31	(Poland) Maciej Dreszer	(Germany) Felbermayr - Reiter	23	24	Ret	Ret	23	20	27	35					1
32	(Netherlands) Bob Herber	(Belgium) Selleslagh Racing Team					Ret	16							1
Guest drivers ineligible to score Silver class points
	(Norway) Mads Siljehaug	(Germany) Felbermayr - Reiter									4	3			
	(Belgium) Gilles Magnus	(Belgium) Selleslagh Racing Team											11	3	
	(France) Gaël Castelli	(France) CMR											9	Ret	
	(Argentina) Valentín Aguirre (Germany) Andreas Patzelt	(Germany) PROsport Performance											DSQ	DSQ	
	(Germany) Alexander Mies	(Germany) PROsport Performance											DSQ	DNS	
Pro-Am class
1	(Germany) Markus Lungstrass	(Germany) Racing One	31	13	**35**	Ret	3	**10**	**10**	31	6	9	**8**	6	184
2	(Germany) Marc Basseng (Germany) Phillip Bethke	(Germany) Schwede Motorsport	8	12	17	15	Ret	36	13	18	7	28	26	**7**	159
3	(Hungary) Csaba Mór	(Germany) Racing One	10	**2**	18	35	4	15	18	32					110
3	(Hungary) Csaba Mór	(Belgium) Selleslagh Racing Team									25	35			110
3	(Hungary) Csaba Mór	(Germany) Allied-Racing											20	31	110
4	(Portugal) Miguel Cristóvão (Bulgaria) Pavel Lefterov	(Germany) RN Vision STS	30	29	33	20	9	8	11	Ret	**20**	14	19	8	104
5	(Italy) Patrick Zamparini	(Germany) Racing One	10	**2**	18	35	4	15	18	32					101
5	(Italy) Patrick Zamparini	(Belgium) Selleslagh Racing Team									25	35			101
6	(Germany) Hamza Owega	(Germany) Racing One	31	13	**35**	Ret	3	**10**	**10**	31	19	36			90
7	(San Marino) Paolo Meloni (Italy) Massimiliano Tresoldi	(San Marino) W & D Racing Team	15	15	20	19	15	34	DSQ	EX	31	12	18	25	86
8	(Brazil) Luiz Floss	(United Arab Emirates) 3Y Technology	29	26	Ret	17	19	Ret	36	17	14	13	14	20	85
9	(Belgium) Jamie Vandenbalck	(United Arab Emirates) 3Y Technology	29	26	Ret	17			36	17	14	13	14	20	81
10	(Germany) John-Louis Jasper (Germany) Jörg Viebahn	(Germany) Phoenix Racing	12	18	19	18	34	35	33	Ret	DNS	DNS	25	10	66
11	(Netherlands) Wolf Nathan	(Netherlands) V8 Racing	Ret	37	Ret	22	10	30	35	11	Ret	26	16	13	61
12	(United Kingdom) Stephen Pattrick	(Spain) Bullitt Racing	22	27	25	23	Ret	Ret	20	**8**	16	25			56
13	(Germany) Dominik Schraml (Germany) Rudolf Schulte	(Germany) Schwede Motorsport	21	17	24	31	Ret	21	19	13	Ret	30			51
14	(Netherlands) Luc Braams (Netherlands) Duncan Huisman	(Netherlands) V8 Racing	16	16	23	39	29	17	23	21			28	Ret	45
15	(United Kingdom) Andy Meyrick	(Spain) Bullitt Racing	22	27	25	23	Ret	Ret	20	**8**					44
16	(Switzerland) Cédric Freiburghaus (Poland) Gosia Rdest	(Germany) Phoenix Racing	24	35	29	21	17	11	DNS	DNS	27	**18**	27	Ret	41
17	(Switzerland) Alain Valente	(Germany) Team GT					8	Ret			8	21			36
18	(Germany) Jan Kasperlik	(Germany) Allied-Racing	36	Ret			Ret	14	30	28	24	16	20	31	35
19	(Germany) Helmut Rödig (Austria) Christopher Zöchling	(Germany) Phoenix Racing			21	16	**24**	Ret							30
20	(Italy) Nicky Pastorelli	(Netherlands) V8 Racing					10	30	35	11					30
21	(Germany) Hendrik Still	(Germany) Allied-Racing	36	Ret	22	30	Ret	14	30	28					23
22	(Sweden) Joakim Söderström (Sweden) Oliver Söderström	(Sweden) Lestrup Racing Team							21	20	23	34	36	21	20
23	(Switzerland) Pascal Bachmann (France) Julien Darras	(Belgium) Street Art Racing	**34**	28	26	27	26	22	42	24	37	31	37	18	19
24	(Germany) Felix von der Laden	(Germany) Team GT	25	38			8	Ret							17
25	(United Kingdom) Fiona James (United Kingdom) Matt Nicoll-Jones	(United Kingdom) Academy Motorsport	Ret	20	Ret	28	27	33	25	Ret	15	39	29	34	17
26	(United Kingdom) JM Littman	(Germany) Allied-Racing			22	30									8
27	(Netherlands) Jelle Beelen	(Netherlands) V8 Racing	Ret	37	Ret	22									4
28	(Italy) Beniamino Caccia	(United Arab Emirates) 3Y Technology					19	Ret							4
29	(Germany) Bernhard Laber	(Germany) Team GT	25	38											2
	(United Kingdom) Will Burns (United Kingdom) Mike Newbould	(United Kingdom) HHC Motorsport			Ret	**34**									0
	(United Kingdom) Joe Osborne (United Kingdom) David Pattison	(United Kingdom) Tolman Motorsport			38	DNS									0
	(Austria) Gottfried Pilz	(Germany) Felbermayr - Reiter											Ret	Ret	
Guest drivers ineligible to score Pro-Am class points
	(Netherlands) Jules Szymkowiak	(Germany) Racing One									6	9	**8**	6	
	(South Africa) Jordan Grogor	(Netherlands) V8 Racing									Ret	26	16	13	
	(Monaco) Micah Stanley	(Germany) Team GT									8	21			
	(Finland) Henri Kauppi	(Germany) Allied-Racing									24	16			
	(United Kingdom) Seb Morris	(Spain) Bullitt Racing									16	25			
	(Portugal) Francisco Guedes	(Germany) Racing One									19	36			
	(Austria) Sascha Halek (Austria) Wolfgang Risch	(Austria) HP Racing International									30	24			
	(Belgium) Mathieu Detry (Belgium) Laurent Jaspers	(Belgium) Jac Motors											30	27	
	(Germany) Ronny C'Rock (Germany) Kevin Strohschänk	(Germany) Racing One											31	36	
	(Austria) Horst Felbermayr Jr.	(Germany) Felbermayr - Reiter											Ret	Ret	
Am class
1	(Switzerland) Niki Leutwiler	(France) TFT Racing	18	**10**	11	**Ret**									194
1	(Switzerland) Niki Leutwiler	(Switzerland) Porsche Zentrum Oberer Zürichsee by TFT Racing					14	**12**	12	15	18	11	23	**33**	194
2	(Italy) Giuseppe Ghezzi (Italy) Alessandro Giovanelli	(Italy) Autorlando Sport	26	Ret	9	11	**12**	19	38	Ret	12	**19**	22	29	161
3	(Austria) Nicolas Schöll	(Germany) Allied-Racing	Ret	DNS	**34**	29	32	DNS	32	23	5	6	**15**	19	136
4	(France) Sylvain Debs (France) Gwenaël Delomier	(United Arab Emirates) 3Y Technology	20	30	Ret	14	Ret	24	26	19	34	29	32	22	133
5	(Belgium) Nicolas Vandierendonck	(Belgium) Selleslagh Racing Team	11	Ret	27	Ret	16	27	Ret	27	26	33	33	24	100
6	(France) David Loger (Monaco) Eric Mouez	(France) CMR	**13**	25	13	25	30	28	41	**Ret**	**36**	Ret	Ret	23	94
7	(Belgium) Johan Vannerum	(Belgium) Selleslagh Racing Team	11	Ret	27	Ret	16	27	Ret	27	26	33	DNS	DNS	78
8	(Netherlands) Liesette Braams	(Netherlands) Las Moras Racing by Equipe Verschuur	37	32	14	38	18	29	34	25	29	Ret	38	26	77
9	(Italy) Dario Cerati (Italy) Maurizio Fondi	(Italy) Autorlando Sport	33	33	16	37	21	26	37	30	35	37	34	32	71
10	(Belgium) Louis-Philippe Soenen	(Belgium) Selleslagh Racing Team	32	31	37	33	28	32	39	33	21	32	35	35	65
11	(Germany) Felix von der Laden	(Germany) Team GT			12	32			28	22	Ret	41	Ret	28	57
12	(Germany) Moritz Kranz	(Belgium) Mühlner Motorsport							**14**	7					43
13	(Germany) Joachim Bölting	(Germany) Allied-Racing	Ret	DNS	**34**	29	32	DNS	32	23					36
14	(Germany) Bernhard Laber	(Germany) Team GT							28	22	Ret	41	Ret	28	32
15	(Germany) Christian Danner	(Germany) Team GT			12	32									25
16	(Belgium) Sven Van Laere	(Netherlands) Las Moras Racing by Equipe Verschuur	37	32	14	38									25
17	(Germany) Katarina Kyvalova (Norway) Egidio Perfetti	(United Kingdom) ERC Sport							22	Ret					15
18	(Sweden) Håkan Ricknäs (Sweden) Fredrik Ros	(Sweden) Ricknäs Motorsport							24	29					14
19	(Germany) Immanuel Vinke	(United Kingdom) Academy Motorsport	28	34											12
20	(Germany) Georg Bernsteiner (Germany) Helmut Rödig	(Germany) Phoenix Racing	27	Ret											8
21	(Netherlands) Luc Braams	(Netherlands) Las Moras Racing by Equipe Verschuur									29	Ret			8
22	(Denmark) Peter Larsen (Sweden) Johan Rosén	(Sweden) Primus Racing							40	26					6
23	(Poland) Łukasz Kręski (Poland) Maciej Marcinkiewicz	(Poland) eSky WP Racing Team					33	31							6
Guest drivers ineligible to score Am class points
	(Belgium) Eric De Doncker	(Belgium) Motorsport98											Ret	30	
Pos.	Driver	Team	ZOL (Belgium)		BRH (United Kingdom)		MIS (Italy)		SPA (Belgium)		HUN (Hungary)		NÜR (Germany)		Points

Key
Colour	Result
Gold	Race winner
Silver	2nd place
Bronze	3rd place
Green	Points finish
Blue	Non-points finish
Blue	Non-classified finish (NC)
Purple	Did not finish (Ret)
Black	Disqualified (DSQ)
Black	Excluded (EX)
White	Did not start (DNS)
White	Race cancelled (C)
White	Withdrew (WD)
Blank	Did not participate

**Bold** – Pole
Italics – Fastest Lap

=== Teams' championship ===
Only the highest finishing car per team scored points and all other cars entered by that team were invisible as far as scoring points concerned. Only the highest ranked car in its respective category counted towards the championship. Parentheses indicate results that did not count towards the championship. Only two cars can be considered as forming the same team for the Teams' championship. If more than two cars are entered under the same competitor license, the competitor has to nominate the car numbers eligible to score points. Failure to do so will default the eligibility to score points to the two cars with the lowest car numbers.

Pos.	Team	Manufacturer	Class	ZOL (Belgium)		BRH (United Kingdom)		MIS (Italy)		SPA (Belgium)		HUN (Hungary)		NÜR (Germany)		Points
1	(Germany) Racing One	Audi	Pro-Am	10	2	18	35	3	**10**	**10**	31	6	9	**8**	6	237
2	(France) TFT Racing (Switzerland) Porsche Zentrum Oberer Zürichsee by TFT Racing	Porsche	Am	18	10	11	Ret	14	**12**	12	15	18	11	23	**33**	200
3	(Germany) Schwede Motorsport	Porsche	Pro-Am	8	12	17	15	Ret	21	13	13	7	28	26	**7**	188
4	(Italy) Autorlando Sport	Porsche	Am	26	33	9	11	**12**	19	37	30	12	**19**	22	29	188
5	(Germany) Allied-Racing	Porsche	Pro-Am	36	Ret	22	(30)	(Ret)	14	(30)	(28)	(24)	(16)	(20)	(31)	172
5	(Germany) Allied-Racing	Porsche	Am	(Ret)	(DNS)	(34)	29	32	(DNS)	32	23	5	6	**15**	19	172
6	(Netherlands) MDM Motorsport	BMW	Silver	4	6	2	2	5	9	6	3	1	7	5	15	171
7	(Netherlands) (Las Moras Racing by) Equipe Verschuur	McLaren	Silver	6	(9)	(39)	(DNS)	(**20**)	1	2	(Ret)	(WD)	(WD)	2	**1**	170
7	(Netherlands) (Las Moras Racing by) Equipe Verschuur	McLaren	Am	(37)	32	14	38	18	(29)	(34)	25	29	Ret	(38)	(26)	170
8	(France) CMR	Alpine; Ginetta	Silver	(3)	(4)	7	(7)	7	(Ret)	3	**1**	(32)	38	9	(Ret)	161
8	(France) CMR	Alpine; Ginetta	Am	13	25	(13)	25	(30)	28	(41)	(**Ret**)	**36**	(Ret)	(Ret)	23	161
9	(Germany) Phoenix Racing (Note: The team's No. 3 car was ineligible to score points at Zolder, Misano and the Nürburgring. The team's No. 4 car was ineligible to score points at Misano. The team's No. 5 car was ineligible to score points at Brands Hatch. The team's No. 6 car was ineligible to score points at Zolder, Brands Hatch, Spa-Francorchamps and the Hungaroring.)	Audi	Silver	**1**	5			(25)	**4**	1	Ret	11	**5**	6	5	158
9	(Germany) Phoenix Racing	Audi	Pro-Am			21	16	**34**	(11)	(DNS)	(DNS)	(27)	(**18**)	(25)	(10)	158
9	(Germany) Phoenix Racing	Audi	Am	(27)	(Ret)											158
10	(Germany) RN Vision STS (Note: The team's No. 110 car was ineligible to score points at Misano and the Nürburgring. The team's No. 111 car was ineligible to score points at Zolder and Brands Hatch. The team's No. 112 car was ineligible to score points at Spa-Francorchamps and the Hungaroring.)	BMW	Silver	7	7	31	6	1	(2)	8	10	**2**	1	(10)	(9)	158
10	(Germany) RN Vision STS	BMW	Pro-Am	(30)	(29)	(33)	(20)	(9)	8					19	8	158
11	(United Kingdom) HHC Motorsport	Ginetta	Silver	2	**1**	**15**	**1**	2	5	**4**	2	Ret	10	**4**	Ret	157
11	(United Kingdom) HHC Motorsport	Ginetta	Pro-Am			(Ret)	(34)									157
12	(United Arab Emirates) 3Y Technology (Note: The team's No. 37 car was ineligible to score points at the Nürburgring. The team's No. 38 car was ineligible to score points at Misano. The team's No. 39 car was ineligible to score points at Zolder, Brands Hatch, Spa-Francorchamps and the Hungaroring.)	BMW	Silver	(Ret)	(14)	4	(13)	36	(13)	(17)	(34)	(33)	(20)			147
12	(United Arab Emirates) 3Y Technology	BMW	Pro-Am	29	26	(Ret)	17			36	17	14	13	14	(20)	147
12	(United Arab Emirates) 3Y Technology	BMW	Am					(Ret)	24					(32)	22	147
13	(Belgium) Selleslagh Racing Team (Note: The team's No. 30 car was ineligible to score points at the Hungaroring. The team's No. 32 car was ineligible to score points at Zolder, Brands Hatch, Misano, Spa-Francorchamps and the Nürburgring.)	Mercedes-AMG	Silver	(14)	Ret	6	4	(Ret)	(16)	Ret	4			(11)	3	142
13	(Belgium) Selleslagh Racing Team	Mercedes-AMG	Pro-Am									(25)	(35)			142
13	(Belgium) Selleslagh Racing Team	Mercedes-AMG	Am	11	(Ret)	(27)	(Ret)	16	27	(Ret)	(27)	21	32	33	(24)	142
14	(Netherlands) V8 Racing	Chevrolet	Silver									28	(8)			136
14	(Netherlands) V8 Racing	Chevrolet	Pro-Am	16	16	23	22	10	17	23	11	(Ret)	26	16	13	136
15	(Austria) True Racing	KTM	Silver	35	8	8	26	11	3	5	5	10	4	3	4	130
16	(Germany) Team GT (Note: The team's No. 89 car was ineligible to score points.)	McLaren	Silver	(9)	3	(Ret)	(40)	(6)	23	(Ret)	(6)	(Ret)	(22)	12	(16)	128
16	(Germany) Team GT	McLaren	Pro-Am	25	(38)			8	(Ret)							128
16	(Germany) Team GT	McLaren	Am			12	32			28	22	Ret	41	(Ret)	28	128
17	(San Marino) W & D Racing Team	BMW	Pro-Am	15	15	20	19	15	34	DSQ	EX	31	12	18	25	115
18	(Spain) Bullitt Racing	Mercedes-AMG	Pro-Am	22	27	25	23	Ret	Ret	20	**8**	16	25			92
19	(United Kingdom) Academy Motorsport	Aston Martin	Silver			5	9									87
19	(United Kingdom) Academy Motorsport	Aston Martin	Pro-Am	(Ret)	20	(Ret)	(28)	27	33	25	Ret	15	39	29	34	87
19	(United Kingdom) Academy Motorsport	Aston Martin	Am	28	(34)											87
20	(Belgium) Street Art Racing	Aston Martin	Pro-Am	34	28	26	27	26	22	42	24	37	31	37	18	70
21	(Germany) Leipert Motorsport	Mercedes-AMG	Silver	5	36	36	3	31	6	15	9	17	40	21	17	66
22	(Austria) Lechner Racing	Mercedes-AMG	Silver	38	19	10	8	22	Ret	Ret	Ret	3	17	13	Ret	55
23	(Germany) Felbermayr - Reiter	KTM	Silver	23	24	Ret	Ret	23	20	27	35	4	3			48
23	(Germany) Felbermayr - Reiter	KTM	Pro-Am											Ret	Ret	48
24	(Sweden) Lestrup Racing Team	BMW	Pro-Am							21	20	23	34	36	21	46
25	(Turkey) Borusan Otomotiv Motorsport	BMW	Silver	40	22	28	12	13	25	16	14	22	27	24	14	45
26	(Belgium) Mühlner Motorsport	Porsche	Am							**14**	7					43
27	(Sweden) Ricknäs Motorsport	Porsche	Am							24	29					18
28	(Poland) eSky WP Racing Team	Maserati	Am					33	31							16
29	(United Kingdom) ERC Sport	Mercedes-AMG	Am							22	Ret					15
30	(Sweden) Primus Racing	Ginetta	Am							40	26					12
31	(Germany) PROsport Performance	Porsche	Silver							7	12			DSQ	DNS	10
32	(United Kingdom) Tolman Motorsport	McLaren	Pro-Am			38	DNS									2
Guest teams ineligible to score points
	(Austria) HP Racing International	Mercedes-AMG	Pro-Am									30	24			
	(Belgium) Jac Motors	Audi	Pro-Am											30	27	
	(Belgium) Motorsport98	Ford	Am											Ret	30	
Pos.	Team	Manufacturer	Class	ZOL (Belgium)		BRH (United Kingdom)		MIS (Italy)		SPA (Belgium)		HUN (Hungary)		NÜR (Germany)		Points

== See also ==
- 2018 French GT4 Cup
- 2018 GT4 Central European Cup
