= 2018 GT4 Central European Cup =

The 2018 GT4 Central European Cup was the first and only season of the GT4 Central European Cup, a sports car championship created and organised by the Stéphane Ratel Organisation (SRO). The season began on 28 April at Most and ended on 7 October at Zandvoort. It was discontinued for 2019, with the new ADAC GT4 Germany taking over its position in the Central European market.

== Calendar ==
On 15 December 2017, the Stéphane Ratel Organisation announced the 2018 calendar.

Round	Circuit	Date	Supporting
1	Autodrom Most, Most, Czech Republic	28–29 April	ADAC GT Masters
2	Red Bull Ring, Spielberg, Austria	19–20 May	F2 Italian Trophy
3	Nürburgring, Nürburg, Germany	30 June–1 July	ADAC Truck-Grand-Prix
4	Automotodróm Slovakia Ring, Orechová Potôň, Slovakia	18–19 August	Standalone event
5	Circuit Zandvoort, Zandvoort, Netherlands	6–7 October	Standalone event

== Entry list ==
Team	Car	No.	Drivers	Class	Rounds
(Germany) Phoenix Racing	Audi R8 LMS GT4	3	(Poland) Gosia Rdest	PA	3
(Germany) Phoenix Racing	Audi R8 LMS GT4	3	(Colombia) Óscar Tunjo	PA	3
(Germany) Phoenix Racing	Audi R8 LMS GT4	4	(Germany) John-Louis Jasper	PA	3
(Germany) Phoenix Racing	Audi R8 LMS GT4	4	(Germany) Helmut Rödig	PA	3
(Poland) eSky WP Racing Team	Maserati GranTurismo MC GT4	7	(Poland) Łukasz Kręski	Am	All
(Poland) eSky WP Racing Team	Maserati GranTurismo MC GT4	7	(Poland) Maciej Marcinkiewicz	Am	All
(Netherlands) Ekris Racing	Ekris M4 GT4	8	(Netherlands) Ricardo van der Ende	PA	5
(Netherlands) Ekris Racing	Ekris M4 GT4	8	(Netherlands) Bernhard van Oranje	PA	5
(Bulgaria) Sofia Car Motorsport	SIN R1 GT4	11	(Bulgaria) Ivan Vlachkov	Am	All
(Bulgaria) Sofia Car Motorsport	SIN R1 GT4	11	(Bulgaria) Konstantin Marshavelov	Am	4
(Bulgaria) Sofia Car Motorsport	SIN R1 GT4	11	(United Kingdom) Chris Chadwick	Am	5
(Austria) razoon - more than racing	KTM X-Bow GT4	13	(Turkey) Önder Erdem	Am	2
(Austria) razoon - more than racing	KTM X-Bow GT4	13	(Austria) Dominik Olbert	Am	2
(Germany) Racing One	Audi R8 LMS GT4	16	(Germany) Hamza Owega	PA	1
(Germany) PROsport Performance	Porsche Cayman PRO4 GT4	18	(Germany) Moritz Oestreich	PA	1
(Germany) PROsport Performance	Porsche Cayman PRO4 GT4	18	(Germany) Luca Wollgarten	PA	1
(Germany) Besagroup Racing	Mercedes-AMG GT4	20	(Croatia) Franjo Kovac	PA	1
(Germany) Besagroup Racing	Mercedes-AMG GT4	20	(Czech Republic) Tomáš Pekař	PA	1
(Germany) Besagroup Racing	Mercedes-AMG GT4	20	(Croatia) Franjo Kovac	Am	2–4
(Germany) Besagroup Racing	Mercedes-AMG GT4	20	(Germany) Cora Schumacher	Am	2–3
(Poland) Salag Racing	KTM X-Bow GT4	21	(Poland) Adam Galas	Am	4
(Germany) / True Racing - Reiter (Note: Cars No. 22 and 23 entered as True Racing - Reiter, car No. 24 entered as Felbermayr - Reiter, car No. 25 entered as Holinger - Reiter and car No. 26 entered as K Racing - Reiter.); (Germany) / Felbermayr - Reiter; (Germany) / Holinger - Reiter; (Germany) / K Racing - Reiter	KTM X-Bow GT4	22	(Czech Republic) David Klar	PA	3
(Germany) / True Racing - Reiter; (Germany) / Felbermayr - Reiter; (Germany) / Holinger - Reiter; (Germany) / K Racing - Reiter	KTM X-Bow GT4	22	(Germany) Lennart Marioneck	PA	3
(Germany) / True Racing - Reiter; (Germany) / Felbermayr - Reiter; (Germany) / Holinger - Reiter; (Germany) / K Racing - Reiter	KTM X-Bow GT4	23	(Czech Republic) Sergej Pavlovec	Am	1
(Germany) / True Racing - Reiter; (Germany) / Felbermayr - Reiter; (Germany) / Holinger - Reiter; (Germany) / K Racing - Reiter	KTM X-Bow GT4	23	(Czech Republic) David Klar	PA	2, 4–5
(Germany) / True Racing - Reiter; (Germany) / Felbermayr - Reiter; (Germany) / Holinger - Reiter; (Germany) / K Racing - Reiter	KTM X-Bow GT4	23	(Austria) Laura Kraihamer	PA	2
(Germany) / True Racing - Reiter; (Germany) / Felbermayr - Reiter; (Germany) / Holinger - Reiter; (Germany) / K Racing - Reiter	KTM X-Bow GT4	23	(Norway) Mads Siljehaug	PA	4
(Germany) / True Racing - Reiter; (Germany) / Felbermayr - Reiter; (Germany) / Holinger - Reiter; (Germany) / K Racing - Reiter	KTM X-Bow GT4	23	(United States) Nicolai Elghanayan	PA	5
(Germany) / True Racing - Reiter; (Germany) / Felbermayr - Reiter; (Germany) / Holinger - Reiter; (Germany) / K Racing - Reiter	KTM X-Bow GT4	24	(Poland) Maciej Dreszer	PA	1
(Germany) / True Racing - Reiter; (Germany) / Felbermayr - Reiter; (Germany) / Holinger - Reiter; (Germany) / K Racing - Reiter	KTM X-Bow GT4	24	(Czech Republic) David Klar	PA	1
(Germany) / True Racing - Reiter; (Germany) / Felbermayr - Reiter; (Germany) / Holinger - Reiter; (Germany) / K Racing - Reiter	KTM X-Bow GT4	25	(Finland) Ilmari Korpivaara	PA	All
(Germany) / True Racing - Reiter; (Germany) / Felbermayr - Reiter; (Germany) / Holinger - Reiter; (Germany) / K Racing - Reiter	KTM X-Bow GT4	25	(Germany) Benjamin Mazatis	PA	All
(Germany) / True Racing - Reiter; (Germany) / Felbermayr - Reiter; (Germany) / Holinger - Reiter; (Germany) / K Racing - Reiter	KTM X-Bow GT4	26	(Switzerland) Marylin Niederhauser	PA	All
(Germany) / True Racing - Reiter; (Germany) / Felbermayr - Reiter; (Germany) / Holinger - Reiter; (Germany) / K Racing - Reiter	KTM X-Bow GT4	26	(Switzerland) Patric Niederhauser	PA	1
(Germany) / True Racing - Reiter; (Germany) / Felbermayr - Reiter; (Germany) / Holinger - Reiter; (Germany) / K Racing - Reiter	KTM X-Bow GT4	26	(Switzerland) Nikolaj Rogivue	PA	2
(Germany) / True Racing - Reiter; (Germany) / Felbermayr - Reiter; (Germany) / Holinger - Reiter; (Germany) / K Racing - Reiter	KTM X-Bow GT4	26	(Norway) Mads Siljehaug	PA	3
(Germany) / True Racing - Reiter; (Germany) / Felbermayr - Reiter; (Germany) / Holinger - Reiter; (Germany) / K Racing - Reiter	KTM X-Bow GT4	26	(Austria) Eike Angermayr	PA	4
(Germany) / True Racing - Reiter; (Germany) / Felbermayr - Reiter; (Germany) / Holinger - Reiter; (Germany) / K Racing - Reiter	KTM X-Bow GT4	26	(Germany) Lennart Marioneck	PA	5
(Belgium) SRT Selleslagh	Mercedes-AMG GT4	30	(Netherlands) Bas Schouten	PA	5
(Belgium) SRT Selleslagh	Mercedes-AMG GT4	30	(Belgium) Nicolas Vandierendonck	PA	5
(Belgium) SRT Selleslagh	Mercedes-AMG GT4	31	(Belgium) Louis-Philippe Soenen	Am	5
(Germany) Allied-Racing	Porsche Cayman GT4 Clubsport MR	41	(Germany) Freddy Kremer	Am	1–3
(Germany) Allied-Racing	Porsche Cayman GT4 Clubsport MR	41	(Austria) Nicolas Schöll	Am	1–2
(Germany) Allied-Racing	Porsche Cayman GT4 Clubsport MR	41	(Germany) Joachim Bölting	Am	3
(Germany) Allied-Racing	Porsche Cayman GT4 Clubsport MR	41	(Germany) Jan Kasperlik	PA	4
(Germany) Allied-Racing	Porsche Cayman GT4 Clubsport MR	41	(Hungary) Csaba Mór	PA	4
(Germany) Allied-Racing	Porsche Cayman GT4 Clubsport MR	41	(Germany) Jan Kasperlik	Am	5
(Germany) Allied-Racing	Porsche Cayman GT4 Clubsport MR	41	(Germany) Jörg Viebahn	Am	5
(Germany) Allied-Racing	Porsche Cayman GT4 Clubsport MR	43	(Netherlands) Rob Severs	PA	All
(Germany) Allied-Racing	Porsche Cayman GT4 Clubsport MR	43	(Germany) Jörg Viebahn	PA	1
(Germany) Allied-Racing	Porsche Cayman GT4 Clubsport MR	43	(Germany) Jan Kasperlik	PA	2
(Germany) Allied-Racing	Porsche Cayman GT4 Clubsport MR	43	(Austria) Nicolas Schöll	PA	3–5
(Austria) Lechner Racing	Mercedes-AMG GT4	47	(Austria) Freddy Fast (Note: Freddy Fast entered in car No. 48 at Round 5.)	Am	All
(Italy) Scuderia Villorba Corse	Maserati GranTurismo MC GT4	50	(Poland) Antoni Chodzen	PA	2–5
(Italy) Scuderia Villorba Corse	Maserati GranTurismo MC GT4	50	(Poland) Piotr Chodzen	PA	2–4
(Italy) Scuderia Villorba Corse	Maserati GranTurismo MC GT4	50	(Italy) Patrick Zamparini	PA	5
(Italy) Scuderia Villorba Corse	Maserati GranTurismo MC GT4	77	(Italy) Romy Dall'Antonia	Am	All
(Italy) Scuderia Villorba Corse	Maserati GranTurismo MC GT4	77	(Italy) Giuseppe Fascicolo	Am	All
(Germany) Team GT	McLaren 570S GT4	87	(Monaco) Micah Stanley	PA	2
(Germany) Team GT	McLaren 570S GT4	87	(Switzerland) Alain Valente	PA	2
(Germany) Team GT	McLaren 570S GT4	88	(Germany) Christian Danner	Am	2
(Germany) Team GT	McLaren 570S GT4	88	(Germany) Bernhard Laber	Am	2
(Netherlands) Equipe Verschuur	McLaren 570S GT4	111	(Netherlands) Liesette Braams	Am	5
(Netherlands) Equipe Verschuur	McLaren 570S GT4	111	(Netherlands) Luc Braams	Am	5

Icon	Class
PA	Pro-Am Cup
Am	Am Cup

== Race results ==
Bold indicates overall winner.

Round		Circuit	Pole position	Pro-Am Winners	Am Winners
1	R1	(Czech Republic) Most	(Poland) No. 7 eSky WP Racing Team	**(Germany) No. 16 Racing One**	(Bulgaria) No. 11 Sofia Car Motorsport
1	R1	(Czech Republic) Most	(Poland) Łukasz Kręski (Poland) Maciej Marcinkiewicz	**(Germany) Hamza Owega**	(Bulgaria) Ivan Vlachkov
1	R2	(Czech Republic) Most	(Germany) No. 26 K Racing - Reiter	**(Germany) No. 26 K Racing - Reiter**	(Bulgaria) No. 11 Sofia Car Motorsport
1	R2	(Czech Republic) Most	(Switzerland) Marylin Niederhauser (Switzerland) Patric Niederhauser	**(Switzerland) Marylin Niederhauser** **(Switzerland) Patric Niederhauser**	(Bulgaria) Ivan Vlachkov
2	R1	(Austria) Red Bull Ring	(Germany) No. 41 Allied-Racing	(Italy) No. 50 Scuderia Villorba Corse	**(Italy) No. 77 Scuderia Villorba Corse**
2	R1	(Austria) Red Bull Ring	(Germany) Freddy Kremer (Austria) Nicolas Schöll	(Poland) Antoni Chodzen (Poland) Piotr Chodzen	**(Italy) Romy Dall'Antonia** **(Italy) Giuseppe Fascicolo**
2	R2	(Austria) Red Bull Ring	(Germany) No. 87 Team GT	**(Germany) No. 43 Allied-Racing**	(Germany) No. 88 Team GT
2	R2	(Austria) Red Bull Ring	(Monaco) Micah Stanley (Switzerland) Alain Valente	**(Germany) Jan Kasperlik** **(Netherlands) Rob Severs**	(Germany) Christian Danner (Germany) Bernhard Laber
3	R1	(Germany) Nürburgring	(Germany) No. 3 Phoenix Racing	**(Germany) No. 26 K Racing - Reiter**	(Italy) No. 77 Scuderia Villorba Corse
3	R1	(Germany) Nürburgring	(Poland) Gosia Rdest (Colombia) Óscar Tunjo	**(Switzerland) Marylin Niederhauser** **(Norway) Mads Siljehaug**	(Italy) Romy Dall'Antonia (Italy) Giuseppe Fascicolo
3	R2	(Germany) Nürburgring	(Germany) No. 43 Allied-Racing	**(Germany) No. 3 Phoenix Racing**	(Bulgaria) No. 11 Sofia Car Motorsport
3	R2	(Germany) Nürburgring	(Austria) Nicolas Schöll (Netherlands) Rob Severs	**(Poland) Gosia Rdest** **(Colombia) Óscar Tunjo**	(Bulgaria) Ivan Vlachkov
4	R1	Slovakia Ring	(Germany) No. 43 Allied-Racing	(Germany) No. 41 Allied-Racing	**(Poland) No. 7 eSky WP Racing Team**
4	R1	Slovakia Ring	(Austria) Nicolas Schöll (Netherlands) Rob Severs	(Germany) Jan Kasperlik (Hungary) Csaba Mór	**(Poland) Łukasz Kręski** **(Poland) Maciej Marcinkiewicz**
4	R2	Slovakia Ring	(Bulgaria) No. 11 Sofia Car Motorsport	**(Germany) No. 23 True Racing - Reiter**	(Poland) No. 7 eSky WP Racing Team
4	R2	Slovakia Ring	(Bulgaria) Konstantin Marshavelov (Bulgaria) Ivan Vlachkov	**(Czech Republic) David Klar** **(Norway) Mads Siljehaug**	(Poland) Łukasz Kręski (Poland) Maciej Marcinkiewicz
5	R1	(Netherlands) Zandvoort	(Germany) No. 43 Allied-Racing	**(Germany) No. 43 Allied-Racing**	(Poland) No. 7 eSky WP Racing Team
5	R1	(Netherlands) Zandvoort	(Austria) Nicolas Schöll (Netherlands) Rob Severs	**(Austria) Nicolas Schöll** **(Netherlands) Rob Severs**	(Poland) Maciej Marcinkiewicz
5	R2	(Netherlands) Zandvoort	(Germany) No. 26 K Racing - Reiter	**(Germany) No. 43 Allied-Racing**	(Austria) No. 48 Lechner Racing
5	R2	(Netherlands) Zandvoort	(Germany) Lennart Marioneck (Switzerland) Marylin Niederhauser	**(Austria) Nicolas Schöll** **(Netherlands) Rob Severs**	(Austria) Freddy Fast

== Championship standings ==
Scoring system

Championship points were awarded for the first ten positions in each race. Entries were required to complete 75% of the winning car's race distance in order to be classified and earn points. Individual drivers were required to participate for a minimum of 25 minutes in order to earn championship points in any race.

Position	**1st**	**2nd**	**3rd**	**4th**	**5th**	**6th**	**7th**	**8th**	**9th**	**10th**
Points	25	18	15	12	10	8	6	4	2	1

=== Drivers' championship ===
Pos.	Driver	Team	MST (Czech Republic)		RBR (Austria)		NÜR (Germany)		SVK (Slovakia)		ZAN (Netherlands)		Points
Pro-Am class
1	(Netherlands) Rob Severs	(Germany) Allied-Racing	4	8	**13**	1	5	**2**	**5**	11	**1**	1	162
2	(Switzerland) Marylin Niederhauser	(Germany) K Racing - Reiter	2	**1**	9	8	1	6	Ret	4	4	**8**	157
3	(Finland) Ilmari Korpivaara (Germany) Benjamin Mazatis	(Germany) Holinger - Reiter	7	2	7	5	12	3	3	3	5	10	149
4	(Czech Republic) David Klar	(Germany) Felbermayr - Reiter	9	6									122
4	(Czech Republic) David Klar	(Germany) True Racing - Reiter			5	7	6	4	7	1	9	Ret	122
5	(Austria) Nicolas Schöll	(Germany) Allied-Racing					5	**2**	**5**	11	**1**	1	102
7	(Poland) Antoni Chodzen	(Italy) Scuderia Villorba Corse			3	Ret	Ret	DNS	4	9	8	2	82
7	(Norway) Mads Siljehaug	(Germany) K Racing - Reiter					1	6					70
7	(Norway) Mads Siljehaug	(Germany) True Racing - Reiter							7	1			70
8	(Germany) Jan Kasperlik	(Germany) Allied-Racing			**13**	1			2	**Ret**			60
9	(Germany) Lennart Marioneck	(Germany) True Racing - Reiter					6	4					55
9	(Germany) Lennart Marioneck	(Germany) K Racing - Reiter									4	**8**	55
10	(Poland) Piotr Chodzen	(Italy) Scuderia Villorba Corse			3	Ret	Ret	DNS	4	9			52
11	(Switzerland) Patric Niederhauser	(Germany) K Racing - Reiter	2	**1**									50
12	(Poland) Gosia Rdest (Colombia) Óscar Tunjo	(Germany) Phoenix Racing					**2**	1					43
13	(Germany) Moritz Oestreich (Germany) Luca Wollgarten	(Germany) PROsport Performance	3	4									33
14	(Austria) Laura Kraihamer	(Germany) True Racing - Reiter			5	7							33
15	(Germany) Jörg Viebahn	(Germany) Allied-Racing	4	8									25
16	(Switzerland) Nikolaj Rogivue	(Germany) K Racing - Reiter			9	8							24
17	(Germany) John-Louis Jasper (Germany) Helmut Rödig	(Germany) Phoenix Racing					3	8					23
18	(Poland) Maciej Dreszer	(Germany) Felbermayr - Reiter	9	6									22
19	(Croatia) Franjo Kovac (Czech Republic) Tomáš Pekař	(Germany) Besagroup Racing	11	11									16
20	(Monaco) Micah Stanley (Switzerland) Alain Valente	(Germany) Team GT			Ret	**10**							10
Guest drivers ineligible to score Pro-Am class points
	(Germany) Hamza Owega	(Germany) Racing One	**1**	3									
	(Netherlands) Bas Schouten (Belgium) Nicolas Vandierendonck	(Belgium) SRT Selleslagh									2	6	
	(Italy) Patrick Zamparini	(Italy) Scuderia Villorba Corse									8	2	
	(Hungary) Csaba Mór	(Germany) Allied-Racing							2	**Ret**			
	(Austria) Eike Angermayr	(Germany) K Racing - Reiter							Ret	4			
	(United States) Nicolai Elghanayan	(Germany) True Racing - Reiter									9	Ret	
	(Netherlands) Ricardo van der Ende (Netherlands) Bernhard van Oranje	(Netherlands) Ekris Racing									DNS	DNS	
Am class
1	(Poland) Maciej Marcinkiewicz	(Poland) eSky WP Racing Team	**Ret**	DNS	4	**3**	7	7	**1**	2	**3**	**4**	162
2	(Italy) Romy Dall'Antonia (Italy) Giuseppe Fascicolo	(Italy) Scuderia Villorba Corse	10	7	1	4	4	12	10	5	7	7	160
3	(Austria) Freddy Fast	(Austria) Lechner Racing	12	9	8	Ret	9	10	6	7	6	3	135
4	(Bulgaria) Ivan Vlachkov	(Bulgaria) Sofia Car Motorsport	5	**5**	12	DNS	**8**	**5**	8	**8**	10	Ret	133
5	(Germany) Freddy Kremer	(Germany) Allied-Racing	6	10	**6**	Ret	10	9					67
6	(Poland) Łukasz Kręski	(Poland) eSky WP Racing Team	**Ret**	DNS	4	**DNS**	WD	WD	**1**	2	WD	WD	65
7	(Croatia) Franjo Kovac	(Germany) Besagroup Racing			11	9	11	11	11	10			54
8	(Germany) Christian Danner (Germany) Bernhard Laber	(Germany) Team GT			2	2							43
9	(Austria) Nicolas Schöll	(Germany) Allied-Racing	6	10	**6**	Ret							42
10	(Germany) Cora Schumacher	(Germany) Besagroup Racing			11	9	11	11					34
11	(Germany) Joachim Bölting	(Germany) Allied-Racing					10	9					25
12	(Germany) Jan Kasperlik (Germany) Jörg Viebahn	(Germany) Allied-Racing									11	5	25
13	(Turkey) Önder Erdem (Austria) Dominik Olbert	(Austria) razoon - more than racing			10	6							20
14	(Czech Republic) Sergej Pavlovec	(Germany) True Racing - Reiter	8	Ret									15
Guest drivers ineligible to score Am class points
	(Poland) Adam Galas	(Poland) Salag Racing							9	6			
	(Bulgaria) Konstantin Marshavelov	(Bulgaria) Sofia Car Motorsport							8	**8**			
	(Belgium) Louis-Philippe Soenen	(Belgium) SRT Selleslagh									13	9	
	(United Kingdom) Chris Chadwick	(Bulgaria) Sofia Car Motorsport									10	Ret	
	(Netherlands) Liesette Braams (Netherlands) Luc Braams	(Netherlands) Equipe Verschuur									12	Ret	
Pos.	Driver	Team	MST (Czech Republic)		RBR (Austria)		NÜR (Germany)		SVK (Slovakia)		ZAN (Netherlands)		Points

Key
Colour	Result
Gold	Race winner
Silver	2nd place
Bronze	3rd place
Green	Points finish
Blue	Non-points finish
Blue	Non-classified finish (NC)
Purple	Did not finish (Ret)
Black	Disqualified (DSQ)
Black	Excluded (EX)
White	Did not start (DNS)
White	Race cancelled (C)
White	Withdrew (WD)
Blank	Did not participate

**Bold** – Pole
Italics – Fastest Lap

=== Teams' championship ===
Pos.	Team	Manufacturer	Points
1	(Italy) Scuderia Villorba Corse	Maserati	163
2	(Poland) eSky WP Racing Team	Maserati	162
3	(Germany) Allied-Racing	Porsche	140
4	(Austria) Lechner Racing	Mercedes-AMG	135
5	(Bulgaria) Sofia Car Motorsport	SIN	133
6	(Germany) Reiter Engineering	KTM	125
7	(Germany) Besagroup Racing	Mercedes-AMG	78
8	(Germany) Team GT	McLaren	43
9	(Germany) PROsport Performance	Porsche	30
10	(Germany) Phoenix Racing	Audi	30
11	(Austria) razoon - more than racing	KTM	20

== See also ==
- 2018 GT4 European Series
- 2018 French GT4 Cup
