= Nicolas Schöll =

Austrian racing driver (born 2001)

- Nationality: (Austria) Austrian
- Born: 7 August 2001 (age 25) Vienna, Austria
- Categorisation: FIA Bronze (2018); FIA Silver (2019–)

Nicolas "Nic" Schöll (born 7 August 2001) is an Austrian racing driver who last competed for Attempto Racing in GT World Challenge Europe.

== Career ==
Schöll began karting in 2011, competing until 2017. Starting out in Mini karts, Schöll won the Euro Finale title in 2014, before taking the RMC Eastern Europe and Rotax International Open titles in Junior Max the following year. For his final two seasons in karting, Schöll stepped up to Senior karts, most notably winning the Rotax Wintercup and Euro Challenge with Strawberry Racing in 2016.

In 2018, Schöll made his car racing debut by joining Porsche-affiliated Allied-Racing to compete in the Am class of the GT4 European Series, as the team's first member of their junior driver programme. In his maiden season in the series, Schöll took class wins in both races at the Hungaroring and Nürburgring rounds en route to a third-place points finish. In parallel, Schöll also raced with the team in the GT4 Central European Cup, in which he won both races at Zandvoort to take fifth in the Pro-Am standings. During 2018, Schöll also made a one-off appearance in the 24H GT Series at Imola with them, winning the race in the GT4 class.

The following year, Schöll continued with Allied and their junior programme for his second season in the GT4 European Series, this time in the Pro-Am class. Racing alongside Jan Kasperlik for all but one round, Schöll scored four class podiums across the five rounds they contested to end the season fourth in points. In parallel, Schöll also raced with them in Porsche Carrera Cup Germany, taking a best result of ninth at the Norisring and ending the year 19th in points.

In early 2020, Schöll made his GT3 debut at the Dubai 24 Hour for Audi-aligned Attempto Racing. For the rest of the year, Schöll continued with the German team for a dual campaign in the GT World Challenge Europe Endurance and Sprint Cups. Between the two campaigns, Schöll finished 10th in the overall standings of the latter with a lone win at Barcelona alongside Frédéric Vervisch. Towards the end of the year, Schöll made a one-off return to Allied-Racing to race in the season finale of the DTM Trophy.

Remaining in the GT World Challenge Europe Endurance Cup the following year, Schöll continued with series newcomers Allied-Racing in the Silver Cup. After two rounds, Schöll left the team and only returned to the series for a one-off appearance at the Nürburgring for Attempto Racing in the Pro class. In 2022, Schöll made his full-time return to Attempto Racing for his second dual campaign in the GT World Challenge Europe Endurance and Sprint Cups as a Silver Cup entrant. In the former, Schöll, Alex Aka and Marius Zug scored three second-place finishes in class en route to runner-up honours in class, whereas in the Sprint Cup, Schöll and Aka took a lone class win at Zandvoort and four other podiums to end the year fourth in the class standings.

== Karting record ==
=== Karting career summary ===
Season	Series	Team	Position
2011	Rotax Max Challenge Central-Eastern Europe — Mini Max		9th
2014	Euro Finale — Mini Max		1st
2014	RMC Eastern Europe — Junior Max		3rd
2014	Rotax Max Euro Trophy — Junior Max		19th
2014	Rotax International Open — Junior Max		6th
2015	Rotax Wintercup — Junior Max	Speedworld Academy	14th
2015	BNL Karting Series — Junior Max		4th
2015	RMC Eastern Europe — Junior Max		1st
2015	Rotax Max Euro Trophy — Junior Max	Strawberry Racing	24th
2015	Rotax International Open — Junior Max	Strawberry Racing	1st
2015	RMC Grand Finals — Junior Max	Strawberry Racing	15th
2016	Rotax Wintercup — Senior Max	Strawberry Racing	1st
2016	Rotax Euro Challenge — Senior Max	Strawberry Racing	1st
2016	BNL Karting Series — Senior Max		4th
2016	Super One Series — OK		14th
2016	Super One Series — Rotax Max		15th
2016	RMC Grand Finals — Senior Max	Strawberry Racing	15th
2017	IAME Euro Series — X30 Senior		5th
2017	Deutsche Kart-Meisterschaft — OK		23rd

== Racing record ==
=== Racing career summary ===
Season	Series	Team	Races	Wins	Poles	F/Laps	Podiums	Points	Position
2018	GT4 European Series – Am	Allied-Racing	10	4	2	1	4	136	**3rd**
2018	GT4 Central European Cup – Am	Allied-Racing	4	0	1	0	1	42	9th
2018	GT4 Central European Cup – Pro-Am	Allied-Racing	6	2	3	2	3	102	5th
2018	24H GT Series Europe – GT4	Allied-Racing	1	1	0	0	1	18	NC
2019	GT4 European Series – Pro-Am	Allied-Racing	10	0	2	0	4	95	4th
2019	Porsche Carrera Cup Germany	Allied-Racing	14	0	0	0	0	24	19th
2020	24H GT Series Continents – GT3 Pro	Attempto Racing	1	0	0	0	0	16	NC
2020	GT World Challenge Europe Endurance Cup	Attempto Racing	4	0	0	0	0	0	NC
2020	GT World Challenge Europe Endurance Cup – Silver	Attempto Racing	4	0	0	0	1	21	18th
2020	GT World Challenge Europe Sprint Cup	Attempto Racing	10	1	0	0	1	30.5	10th
2020	GT World Challenge Europe Sprint Cup – Silver	Attempto Racing	2	0	0	0	0	9	10th
2020	Intercontinental GT Challenge	Attempto Racing	1	0	0	0	0	0	NC
2020	DTM Trophy	Allied Racing	2	0	0	0	1	29	12th
2021	GT World Challenge Europe Endurance Cup	Allied-Racing	1	0	0	0	0	0	NC
2021	GT World Challenge Europe Endurance Cup	Audi Sport Team Attempto	1	0	0	0	0	0	NC
2021	GT World Challenge Europe Endurance Cup – Pro-Am	Allied-Racing	1	0	0	0	0	1	39th
2022	24H GT Series Continents – GT3	Attempto Racing	1	0	0	0	0	16	NC
2022	GT World Challenge Europe Endurance Cup	Attempto Racing	5	0	0	0	0	4	32nd
2022	GT World Challenge Europe Endurance Cup – Silver	Attempto Racing	5	0	1	1	3	76	**2nd**
2022	GT World Challenge Europe Sprint Cup	Attempto Racing	10	0	0	0	0	5.5	19th
2022	GT World Challenge Europe Sprint Cup – Silver	Attempto Racing	10	1	1	0	5	80.5	4th

=== Complete GT4 European Series results ===
(key) (Races in bold indicate pole position) (Races in italics indicate fastest lap)

Year	Team	Car	Class	1	2	3	4	5	6	7	8	9	10	11	12	Pos	Points
2018	Allied-Racing	Porsche Cayman GT4 Clubsport MR	Am	ZOL; 1 Ret	ZOL; 2 DNS	**BRH**; **1**; 34	BRH; 2; 29	MIS; 1; 32	MIS; 2 DNS	SPA; 1; 32	SPA; 2; 23	HUN; 1; 5	HUN; 2; 6	**NÜR**; **1**; 15	NÜR; 2; 19	3rd	136
2019	Allied-Racing	Porsche 718 Cayman GT4 Clubsport	Pro-Am	**MNZ**; **1**; 7	**MNZ**; **2**; 9	BRH; 1	BRH; 2	LEC; 1; 32	LEC; 2; 11	MIS; 1; 26	MIS; 2; 12	ZAN; 1; 14	ZAN; 2 Ret	NÜR; 1; 28	NÜR; 2; 9	4th	95

=== Complete GT World Challenge Europe results ===
==== GT World Challenge Europe Endurance Cup ====
(Races in bold indicate pole position) (Races in italics indicate fastest lap)

Year	Team	Car	Class	1	2	3	4	5	6	7	Pos.	Points
2020	Attempto Racing	Audi R8 LMS Evo	Silver	IMO; 28	NÜR; 24	SPA; 6H; 56	SPA; 12H; 56	SPA; 24H; Ret	LEC; Ret		18th	21
2021	Allied-Racing	Porsche 911 GT3 R	Pro-Am	MNZ; DNS	LEC; 35	SPA; 6H	SPA; 12H	SPA; 24H			39th	1
2021	Audi Sport Team Attempto	Audi R8 LMS Evo	Pro						NÜR; 11	CAT	NC	0
2022	Attempto Racing	Audi R8 LMS Evo II	Silver	IMO; 16	LEC; 39	SPA; 6H; 30	SPA; 12H; 13	SPA; 24H; 15	HOC; 8	CAT; 17	2nd	76

==== GT World Challenge Europe Sprint Cup ====
(key) (Races in bold indicate pole position) (Races in italics indicate fastest lap)

Year	Team	Car	Class	1	2	3	4	5	6	7	8	9	10	Pos.	Points
2020	Attempto Racing	Audi R8 LMS Evo	Pro	MIS; 1; 6	MIS; 2; 17	MIS; 3; 16	MAG; 1; 4	MAG; 2 Ret			CAT; 1; 8	CAT; 2; 1	CAT; 3; 16	10th	30.5
2020	Attempto Racing	Audi R8 LMS Evo	Silver						ZAN; 1; 17	ZAN; 2; 14				10th	9
2022	Attempto Racing	Audi R8 LMS Evo II	Silver	BRH; 1; 10	BRH; 2; 9	MAG; 1; 14	MAG; 2; 9	ZAN; 1; 12	**ZAN**; **2**; 8	MIS; 1 Ret	MIS; 2; 9	VAL; 1; 19	VAL; 2; 20	4th	80.5
