= Finlay Hutchison =

British racing driver (born 2000)

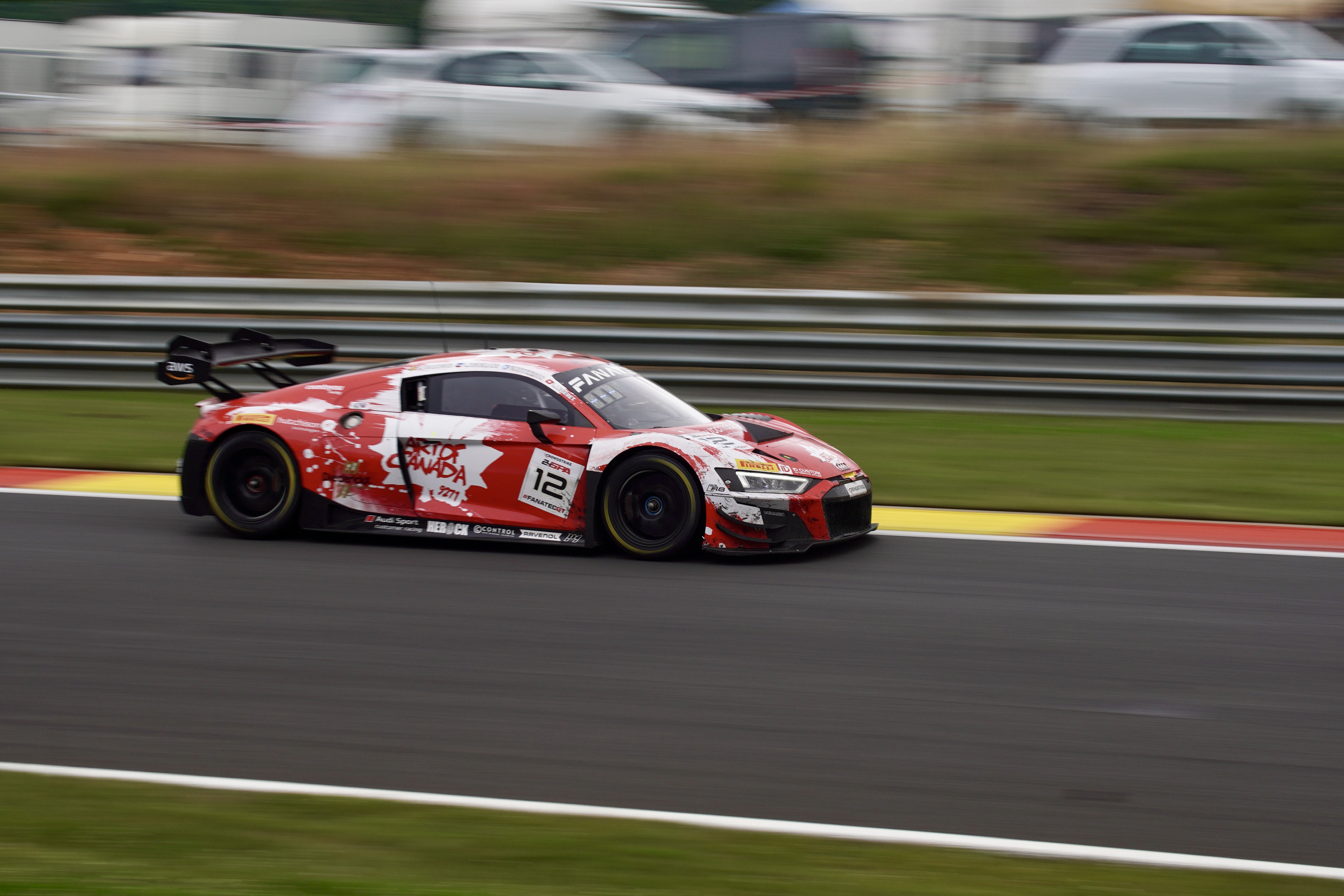
- Hutchison in his Audi in 2023
- Nationality: (United Kingdom) British
- Born: 20 January 2000 (age 26) Dundee, Scotland
- Categorisation: FIA Silver

Finlay Hutchison (born 20 January 2000) is a British racing driver from Scotland who last competed in GT World Challenge Europe and the Italian GT Championship for VSR.

== Career ==
Hutchison made his single-seater debut in 2016, racing for Mark Burdett Motorsport in the Formula Renault 2.0 Northern European Cup. In his only season in the series, Hutchison scored a best result of 15th at the Hungaroring as he ended the year 23rd in points. Switching to sportscars for 2017, Hutchison joined Equipe Verschuur to race in the Silver Cup of the GT4 European Series Northern Cup. Driving a McLaren 570S GT4, Hutchison scored three class podiums, including a best outright finish of second at Zandvoort to secure fifth in points.

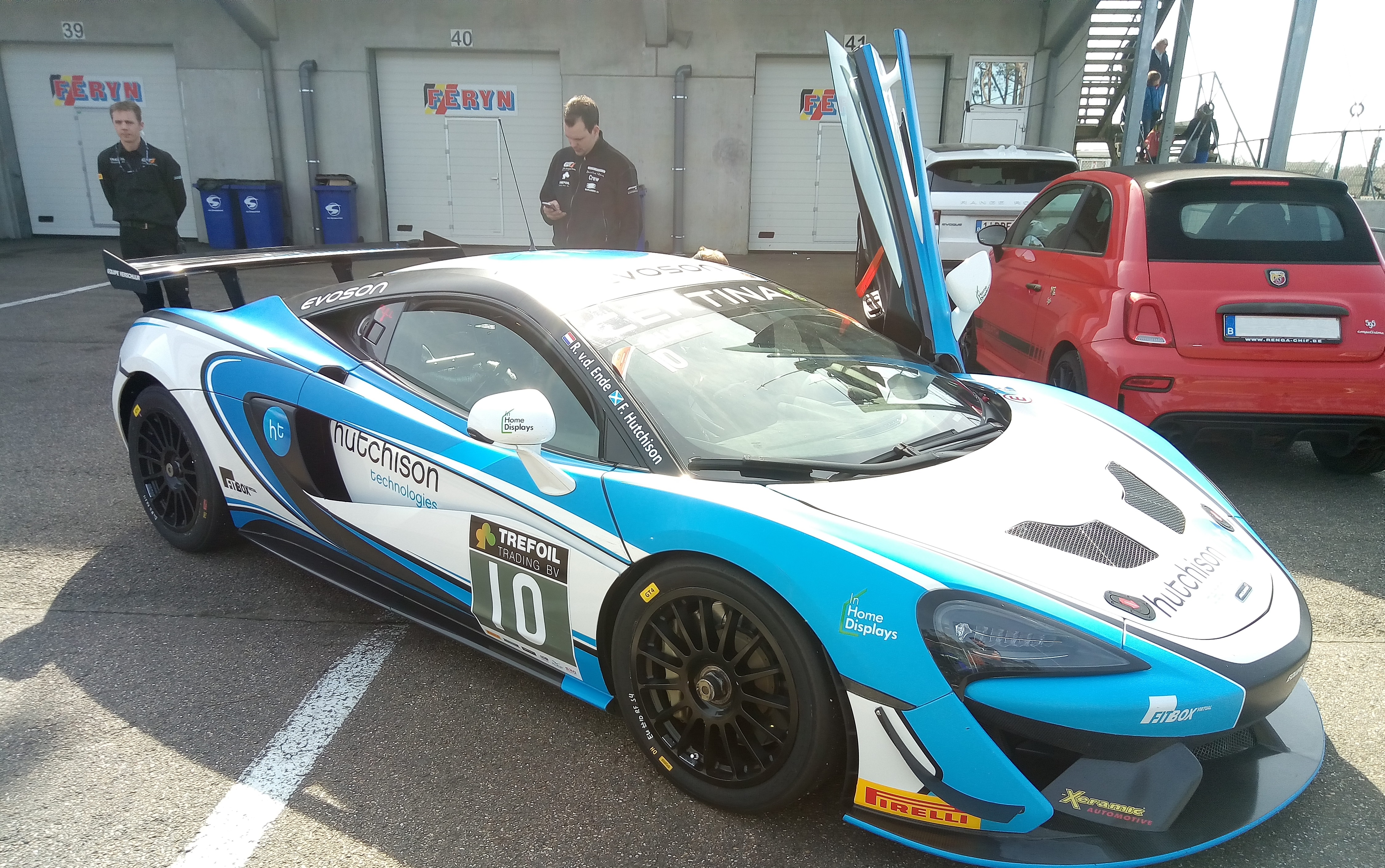
Equipe Verschuur's McLaren 570S GT4, as raced by Hutchison in 2018.

Continuing in GT4 competition for 2018, Hutchison remained with Equipe Verschuur for a dual campaign in the GT4 European Series and the British GT Championship. In the former, Hutchison won at Misano and the Nürburgring en route to a fourth-place points finish, whereas in the latter, he took a lone GT4 Silver win at Donington Park to clinch fifth in points. At the end of the year, Hutchison raced in the GT4 International Cup for Academy Motorsport, in which he finished third overall alongside Matt Nicoll-Jones. Moving up to GT3 competition for the following year, Hutchison joined Audi-linked Phoenix Racing for a dual campaign in the Blancpain GT Series Endurance Cup and Blancpain GT World Challenge Europe. Between the two campaigns, Hutchison found more success in the former, taking a Silver Cup podium at Le Castellet to take ninth in points. During 2019, Hutchison also raced in the final two rounds of the GT4 European Series as a guest driver, most notably finishing second in race one at Zandvoort for Camaro-fielding V8 Racing. Also during the year, Hutchison became part of the BRDC Rising Stars programme.

In 2020, Hutchison primarily raced in the LMGTE class of the European Le Mans Series for Ferrari-fielding JMW Motorsport, scoring a best result of fourth at Le Castellet to take seventh in points. In parallel, Hutchison also raced in the GT World Challenge Europe Endurance Cup with Mercedes-linked Haupt Racing Team at Imola, before switching to Audi-fielding Attempto Racing for the remainder of the season. Continuing with Audi machinery for 2021, Hutchison joined Saintéloc Racing for his third full-time season in the GT World Challenge Europe Endurance Cup. Racing in the Pro class for the first four rounds, Hutchison scored points finishes at Monza and Le Castellet, before switching to the Invitational class for Barcelona as he gave the Audi R8 LMS Evo II its debut.

After racing in the 2022 Asian Le Mans Series' GT class for Attempto Racing, Hutchison joined Audi-affiliated Team WRT to return to the GT World Challenge Europe Endurance Cup. Racing in the Silver Cup, Hutchison scored a lone class podium at Le Castellet to take 14th in points. Remaining with Audi machinery through 2023, Hutchison switched to Comtoyou Racing for a dual campaign in the GT World Challenge Europe Endurance and Sprint Cups. In the former, Hutchison scored a class win at Monza and three further podiums to secure runner-up honors in the Silver Cup, whereas in the latter, he took a lone class win at Valencia and six podiums en route to a third-place points finish in the Gold Cup. Hutchison was due to remain with the Belgian team for the following year as they switched to Aston Martin machinery, but was replaced by Esteban Muth on the eve of the season. In 2025, Hutchison joined Lamborghini-linked VSR for a dual campaign in both the GT World Challenge Europe Endurance Cup and the Italian GT Championship Sprint Cup, but left the team after partaking in the first round of both series.

== Personal life ==
In 2021, Hutchison was given a £2,000 fine and 120 hours of community service, after allowing one of his friends to drive his BMW M4 uninsured, which then resulted in a hit-and-run accident which resulted in the death of a pedestrian. In 2023, Hutchison was charged with dangerous driving after being caught speeding in the streets of Perth in November of 2019. Two years later, Hutchison was involved in a traffic collision on the A9, which left his passenger with life-threatening injuries.

== Karting record ==
=== Karting career summary ===
Season	Series	Team	Position
2011	Trent Valley Kart Club — Mini Max		64th
2013	Trent Valley Kart Club — Mini Max	Strawberry Racing	54th
2014	Rotax Max Winter Cup — Junior Max		12th
2014	Super One Series — Junior Max		15th
2014	Rotax Max Euro Trophy — Junior Max		18th

== Racing record ==
=== Racing career summary ===
Season	Series	Team	Races	Wins	Poles	F/Laps	Podiums	Points	Position
2016	Formula Renault 2.0 Northern European Cup	Mark Burdett Motorsport	15	0	0	0	0	37	23rd
2016	Eurocup Formula Renault 2.0	Mark Burdett Motorsport	2	0	0	0	0	0	NC†
2016	Eurocup Formula Renault 2.0	JD Motorsport	2	0	0	0	0	0	NC†
2016	MaX 5 Racing Championship – Class B		2	0	0	0	0	81	12th
2017	24H Series – TCR	Cadspeed Racing	1	0	0	0	0	0	NC
2017	Audi Sport TT Cup	N/A	5	0	0	0	1	37	16th
2017	GT4 European Series Northern Cup – Silver	Equipe Verschuur	9	0	1	0	3	86	5th
2017	GT4 European Series Southern Cup – Pro-Am	Equipe Verschuur	4	0	0	0	0	6	25th
2017–18	Dutch Winter Endurance Championship – Division 1	Equipe Verschuur	1	1	0	0	1	12	
2018	24H GT Series Continents – A6	V8 Racing	1	0	0	0	0	28	NC
2018	British GT Championship – GT4 Silver	Equipe Verschuur	9	1	1	0	2	113	5th
2018	GT4 European Series – Silver	Equipe Verschuur	9	2	2	2	4	108	4th
2018	GT4 European Series – Silver	V8 Racing	2	0	0	0	0	108	4th
2018	GT4 International Cup – Silver	Academy Motorsport	1	0	0	0	1	—N/a	**3rd**
2018	24H TCE Series Europe – SP3	CWS	1	0	0	0	0	0	NC
2019	24H GT Series Continents – A6-Pro	V8 Racing	1	0	0	0	0	0	NC
2019	Blancpain GT Series Endurance Cup	Phoenix Racing	5	0	0	0	0	0	NC
2019	Blancpain GT Series Endurance Cup – Silver	Phoenix Racing	5	0	0	0	1	42	9th
2019	Blancpain GT World Challenge Europe	Phoenix Racing	10	0	0	0	0	11	16th
2019	VLN Series – SP10	Walkenhorst Motorsport	1	0	0	0	0	4.17	34th
2019	GT4 European Series – Silver	V8 Racing	2	0	0	0	1	0	NC†
2019	GT4 European Series – Silver	Academy Motorsport	2	0	0	0	0	0	NC†
2020	24H GT Series Continents – GT3	Toksport WRT	1	0	0	0	1	26	NC
2020	European Le Mans Series – LMGTE	JMW Motorsport	5	0	0	0	0	38	7th
2020	GT World Challenge Europe Endurance Cup	Haupt Racing Team	1	0	0	0	0	0	NC
2020	GT World Challenge Europe Endurance Cup	Attempto Racing	3	0	0	0	0	0	NC
2020	GT World Challenge Europe Endurance Cup – Silver	Haupt Racing Team	1	0	0	0	0	15	21st
2020	GT World Challenge Europe Endurance Cup – Silver	Attempto Racing	3	0	0	0	0	15	21st
2020	Intercontinental GT Challenge	Attempto Racing	1	0	0	0	0	0	NC
2020	GT World Challenge Europe Sprint Cup	Attempto Racing	2	0	0	0	0	0	NC
2020	GT World Challenge Europe Sprint Cup – Silver	Attempto Racing	2	0	0	0	0	9	10th
2021	24H GT Series – GT3	Attempto Racing	1	0	0	0	0	0	NC
2021	6 Hours of Abu Dhabi – GT	Attempto Racing	1	0	0	0	0	—N/a	DNF
2021	GT World Challenge Europe Endurance Cup	Saintéloc Racing	5	0	0	0	0	3	29th
2021	GT World Challenge Europe Endurance Cup – Invitational	Saintéloc Racing	1	1	0	0	1	0	NC†
2021	GT World Challenge Europe Sprint Cup	Saintéloc Racing	2	0	0	0	0	0	NC
2022	Asian Le Mans Series – GT	Attempto Racing	4	0	0	0	0	2	18th
2022	24H GT Series Continents – GT3	Attempto Racing	1	0	0	0	0	16	NC
2022	24H TCE Series Continents – TCX	CWS Engineering	1	0	0	0	0	5	NC
2022	GT World Challenge Europe Endurance Cup	Team WRT	5	0	0	0	0	0	NC
2022	GT World Challenge Europe Endurance Cup – Silver	Team WRT	5	0	0	0	1	24	14th
2022	International GT Open	Optimum Motorsport	2	0	0	0	0	0	NC†
2022	Intercontinental GT Challenge	Tresor by Attempto	1	0	0	0	0	6	19th
2022–23	Middle East Trophy – GT3	Tresor by Attempto Racing	1	0	0	0	0	0	NC
2023	GT World Challenge Europe Endurance Cup	Comtoyou Racing	5	0	0	0	0	0	NC
2023	GT World Challenge Europe Endurance Cup – Silver	Comtoyou Racing	5	1	0	1	4	100	**2nd**
2023	GT World Challenge Europe Sprint Cup	Comtoyou Racing	10	0	0	0	0	1	21st
2023	GT World Challenge Europe Sprint Cup – Gold	Comtoyou Racing	10	1	5	1	7	98	**3rd**
2025	GT World Challenge Europe Endurance Cup	VSR	1	0	0	0	0	0	NC
2025	GT World Challenge Europe Endurance Cup – Silver	VSR	1	0	0	0	0	10	31st
2025	Italian GT Championship Sprint Cup – GT3	VSR	2	0	0	0	0	11	NC

^{†} As Hutchison was a guest driver, he was ineligible to score points.

=== Complete Formula Renault 2.0 NEC results ===
(key) (Races in bold indicate pole position) (Races in italics indicate fastest lap)

Year	Entrant	1	2	3	4	5	6	7	8	9	10	11	12	13	14	15	DC	Points
2016	Mark Burdett Motorsport	MNZ; 1; 16	MNZ; 2; 18	SIL; 1; 19	SIL; 2; 18	HUN; 1; 18	HUN; 2; 15	SPA; 1; 19	SPA; 2; 22	ASS; 1; 19	ASS; 2; 22	NÜR; 1; 21	NÜR; 2; 20	HOC; 1; 18	HOC; 2; 18	HOC; 3; 17	23rd	37

=== Complete GT4 European Series results ===
(key) (Races in bold indicate pole position) (Races in italics indicate fastest lap)

Year	Team	Car	Class	1	2	3	4	5	6	7	8	9	10	11	12	Pos	Points
2017	Equipe Verschuur	McLaren 570S GT4	Silver	MIS; 1; 4	MIS; 2; 16	BRH; 1	BRH; 2	RBR; 1 Ret	RBR; 2 DNS	**SVK**; **1**; 6	SVK; 2; 5	ZAN; 1; 28	ZAN; 2; 2	NÜR; 1; 3	NÜR; 2; 5	5th	86
2018	Equipe Verschuur	McLaren 570S GT4	Silver	ZOL; 1; 6	ZOL; 2; 9	BRH; 1; 39	BRH; 2 DNS	**MIS**; **1**; 20	MIS; 2; 1	SPA; 1; 2	SPA; 2 Ret			NÜR; 1; 2	**NÜR**; **2**; 1	4th	108
2018	V8 Racing	Chevrolet Camaro GT4.R	Silver									HUN; 1; 28	HUN; 2; 8			4th	108
2019	V8 Racing	Chevrolet Camaro GT4.R	Silver	MNZ; 1	MNZ; 2	BRH; 1	BRH; 2	LEC; 1	LEC; 2	MIS; 1	MIS; 2	ZAN; 1; 2	ZAN; 2; 7			NC†	0†
2019	Academy Motorsport	Aston Martin Vantage AMR GT4	Silver											NÜR; 1 Ret	NÜR; 2; 19	NC†	0†

=== Complete British GT Championship results ===
(key) (Races in bold indicate pole position) (Races in italics indicate fastest lap)

Year	Team	Car	Class	1	2	3	4	5	6	7	8	9	DC	Points
2018	Equipe Verschuur	McLaren 570S GT4	GT4 Silver	OUL; 1; 25	OUL; 2; 34	ROC; 15	SNE; 1; 18	SNE; 2; 28	**SIL**; 28	SPA; 13	BRH; 18	DON; 13	5th	113

=== Complete GT World Challenge Europe results ===
==== GT World Challenge Europe Endurance Cup ====
(Races in bold indicate pole position) (Races in italics indicate fastest lap)

Year	Team	Car	Class	1	2	3	4	5	6	7	Pos.	Points
2019	Phoenix Racing	Audi R8 LMS Evo	Silver	MNZ; 14	SIL; 21	LEC; 12	SPA; 6H; 29	SPA; 12H; 48	SPA; 24H; Ret	CAT; 23	9th	42
2020	Haupt Racing Team	Mercedes-AMG GT3 Evo	Silver	IMO; Ret							21st	15
2020	Attempto Racing	Audi R8 LMS Evo	Silver		NÜR; 24	SPA; 6H; 56	SPA; 12H; 56	SPA; 24H; Ret	LEC; Ret		21st	15
2021	Saintéloc Racing	Audi R8 LMS Evo	Pro	MNZ; 9	LEC; 10	SPA; 6H; 34	SPA; 12H; Ret	SPA; 24H; Ret	NÜR; 17		29th	3
2021	Saintéloc Racing	Audi R8 LMS Evo II	Invitational							CAT; 9	NC†	0†
2022	Team WRT	Audi R8 LMS Evo II	Silver	IMO; 27	LEC; 14	SPA; 6H; 59	SPA; 12H; 49	SPA; 24H; 39	HOC; 37	CAT; Ret	14th	24
2023	Comtoyou Racing	Audi R8 LMS Evo II	Silver	MNZ; 16	LEC; 19	SPA; 6H; 33	SPA; 12H; 22	SPA; 24H; 19	NÜR; 27	CAT; 33	2nd	100
2025	VSR	Lamborghini Huracán GT3 Evo 2	Silver	LEC; 25	MNZ	SPA; 6H	SPA; 12H	SPA; 24H	NÜR	BAR	31st	10

==== GT World Challenge Europe Sprint Cup ====
(key) (Races in bold indicate pole position) (Races in italics indicate fastest lap)

Year	Team	Car	Class	1	2	3	4	5	6	7	8	9	10	Pos.	Points
2019	Phoenix Racing	Audi R8 LMS Evo	Pro	BRH; 1; 8	BRH; 2; 12	MIS; 1; 10	MIS; 2; 5	ZAN; 1; 8	ZAN; 2; 10	NÜR; 1; 13	NÜR; 2; 25	HUN; 1; 18	HUN; 2; 20	16th	11
2020	Attempto Racing	Audi R8 LMS Evo	Silver	MIS; 1	MIS; 2	MIS; 3	MAG; 1	MAG; 2	ZAN; 1; 17	ZAN; 2; 14	CAT; 1	CAT; 2	CAT; 3	10th	9
2021	Saintéloc Racing	Audi R8 LMS Evo	Pro	MAG; 1	MAG; 2	ZAN; 1	ZAN; 2	MIS; 1; 15	MIS; 2; 15	BRH; 1	BRH; 2	VAL; 1	VAL; 2	NC	0
2023	Comtoyou Racing	Audi R8 LMS Evo II	Gold	BRH; 1; 17	**BRH**; **2**; 9	**MIS**; **1** Ret	MIS; 2; 19	**HOC**; **1**; 26	HOC; 2; 15	**VAL**; **1**; 14	VAL; 2; 14	**ZAN**; **1**; 14	ZAN; 2; 11	3rd	98

=== Complete European Le Mans Series results ===
(key) (Races in bold indicate pole position; results in italics indicate fastest lap)

Year	Entrant	Class	Chassis	Engine	1	2	3	4	5	Rank	Points
2020	JMW Motorsport	LMGTE	Ferrari 488 GTE Evo	Ferrari F154CB 3.9 L Turbo V8	LEC; 4	SPA; 9	LEC; 7	MNZ; 6	ALG; 7	7th	38

=== Complete Asian Le Mans Series results ===
(key) (Races in bold indicate pole position) (Races in italics indicate fastest lap)

Year	Team	Class	Car	Engine	1	2	3	4	Pos.	Points
2022	Attempto Racing	GT	Audi R8 LMS Evo	Audi DAR 5.2 L V10	DUB; 1; 15	DUB; 2; 15	ABU; 1; 19	ABU; 2; 14	18th	2
