= Maciej Dreszer =

Polish racing driver

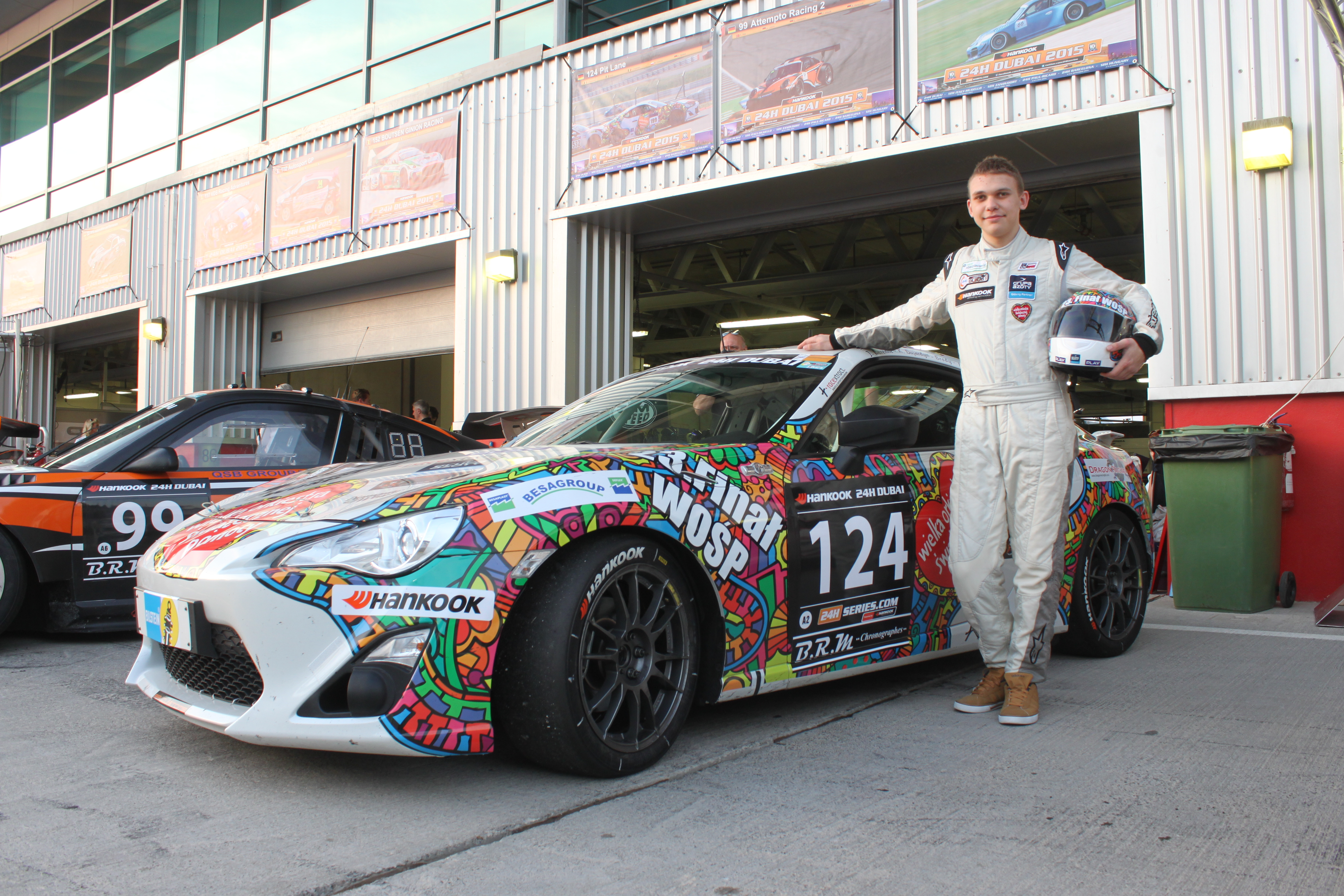
- Nationality: (Poland) Polish
- Born: Maciej Marian Dreszer; 27 March 1996 (age 30) Tarnów, Lesser Poland

NASCAR Whelen Euro Series career
- Debut season: 2017
- Current team: DF1 Racing

Previous series
- 2016 2015 2015 2014 2013 2012: GT4 European Series; 24H Series; BMW M235i Cup Belgium; VLN Toyota GT86 Cup; Volkswagen Castrol Cup; Kia Lotos Race

Championship titles
- 2015 2014: BMW M235i Cup Belgium; VLN Toyota GT86 Cup

Maciej Marian Dreszer (born 27 March 1996 in Tarnów, Lesser Poland) is a Polish racing driver. Dreszer was the runner-up in the 2016 GT4 European Series.

== Career ==
Dreszer started his racing career in 2012 in the Kia Lotos Race, the Polish based Kia Picanto Cup series. The 16-year old finished twelfth in the season standings, scoring three podium finishes. The following season, Dreszer graduated into the Volkswagen Castrol Cup, the Polish based Volkswagen Golf Cup series. Dreszer again finished twelfth in the series.

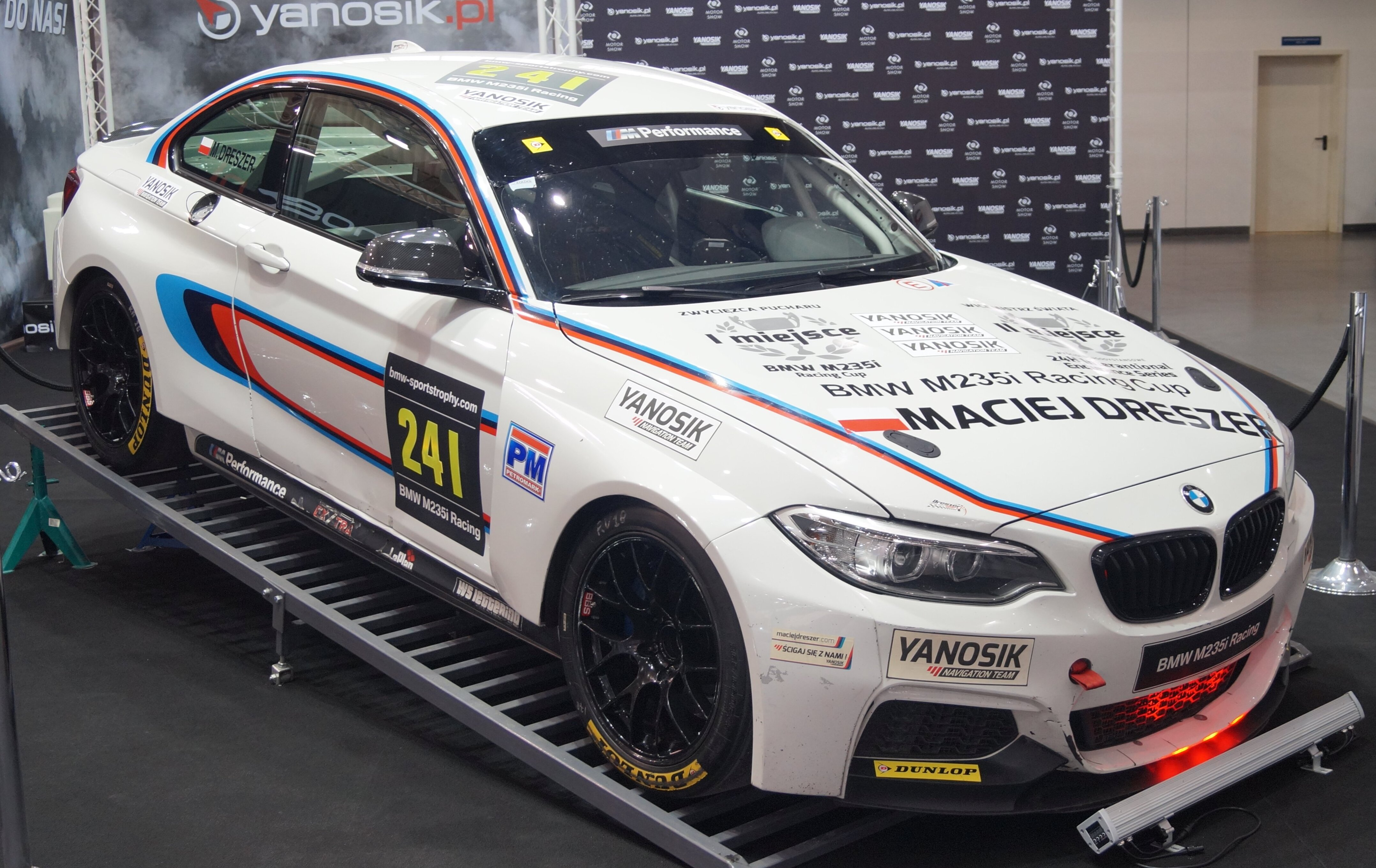

For 2014, Dreszer joined Dörr Motorsport to race in the VLN Toyota GT86 Cup. Along with teammates Arne Hoffmeister and Fabian Wrabetz, the team finished fourth in class at the famous Nordschleife in their first race. The team scored three class wins and won the series championship. The following season, Dreszer joined Dutch driver Stephane Kox in the BMW M235i Cup Belgium. The team scored four victories at Circuit Zolder and Circuit de Spa-Francorchamps. For the 24 Hours of Zolder, the duo was joined by experienced drivers Peter Kox, Jos Menten and Dennis Retera and dominated the race. Dreszer also placed second in the 24H Series Cup 1 class.

Following his successful 2015 campaign, Dreszer was selected as Reiter Young Star, alongside Mads Siljehaug. The duo raced in the 2016 GT4 European Series. Winning one race, at Circuit Park Zandvoort, the team picked up a total of four podium finishes. The team secured second place at the final round in their KTM X-Bow.

== Motorsports results ==
=== 24 Hours of Zolder results ===
Year	Team	Co-Drivers	Car	Class	Laps	Pos.	Class Pos.
2015	(Poland) Dreszer Motorsport	(Netherlands) Stephane Kox (Netherlands) Peter Kox (Netherlands) Dennis Retera (Netherlands) Jos Menten	BMW M235i Racing	T7	730	5th	1st
