= 2014 GT4 European Series =

Seasons
- ← 2013 (Trophy) 2015 →

The 2014 GT4 European Series season was the seventh season of the GT4 European Cup and the first with the new series denomination, the GT4 European Series. The season began on 10 May at Misano, and finished on 26 October at Monza after six race weekends.

In the main GT4 professional class, the championship title was won by two-time defending champion Ricardo van der Ende and team-mate Bernhard van Oranje for Racing Team Holland by Ekris Motorsport. Van der Ende and van Oranje won five races during the season, and ultimately won the title during the first race at Monza. The runner-up position, 22 points in arrears of van der Ende and van Oranje, was taken by 2013 amateur champion Jörg Viebahn. Viebahn won three races during the season; he won with Bertus Sanders at Misano and Paul Ricard, and partnered Simon Knap to victory at Monza. Although being outscored by Duncan Huisman and Luc Braams on total points, the series' best ten results regulation allowed Marcel Nooren and Jan Joris Verheul to take third in the championship, by a single point. Nooren and Verheul took successive victories at Spa-Francorchamps and Paul Ricard, while Huisman and Braams won at the Nürburgring. The only other entry to win a race was Alfab Racing, with drivers Erik Behrens and Daniel Roos, winning the first race at Monza after Huisman and Braams were given a post-race penalty.

The amateur GT4 class was poorly supported, with only three entries taking part at any point during the 2014 season. With seven victories, André Grammatico was the winner of the championship, and finished 15 points clear – on dropped scores – of Liesette Braams and Rob Severs, who won four races. The remaining race victory was taken by Fabian Lauda, who won at Zandvoort. In the teams' championship, Racing Team Holland by Ekris Motorsport claimed the title by 31 points, ahead of V8 Racing.

== Calendar ==
Rnd	Circuit	Date	Event
1	Misano World Circuit, Italy	10–11 May	Italian GT Championship
2	Circuit Park Zandvoort, North Holland, Netherlands	5–6 July	Zandvoort Masters
3	Circuit de Spa-Francorchamps, Belgium	25–26 July	Blancpain Endurance Series, 24 Hours of Spa
4	Circuit Paul Ricard, France	30–31 August	Italian GT Championship
5	Nürburgring, Germany	20–21 September	Blancpain Endurance Series, 1000 km Nürburgring
6	Autodromo Nazionale Monza, Italy	25–26 October	Italian GT Championship

== Entry list ==
2014 Entry List
Team	Car	No.	Drivers	Class	Rounds
(Netherlands) Racing Team Holland by Ekris Motorsport	BMW M3 GT4	1; 101	(Netherlands) Bernhard van Oranje	P	All
(Netherlands) Racing Team Holland by Ekris Motorsport	BMW M3 GT4	1; 101	(Netherlands) Ricardo van der Ende	P	All
(Netherlands) Racing Team Holland by Ekris Motorsport	BMW M3 GT4	8; 108	(Netherlands) Simon Knap	P	All
(Netherlands) Racing Team Holland by Ekris Motorsport	BMW M3 GT4	8; 108	(Netherlands) Pieter Christiaan van Oranje	P	1–5
(Netherlands) Racing Team Holland by Ekris Motorsport	BMW M3 GT4	8; 108	(Germany) Jörg Viebahn	P	6
(Netherlands) Las Moras Racing Team (V8 Racing)	Chevrolet Camaro GT4	2; 102	(Netherlands) Luc Braams	P	All
(Netherlands) Las Moras Racing Team (V8 Racing)	Chevrolet Camaro GT4	2; 102	(Netherlands) Duncan Huisman	P	All
(Netherlands) Las Moras Racing Team (V8 Racing)	Chevrolet Camaro GT4	3; 103	(Netherlands) Marcel Nooren	P	All
(Netherlands) Las Moras Racing Team (V8 Racing)	Chevrolet Camaro GT4	3; 103	(Netherlands) Jan Joris Verheul	P	All
(Netherlands) Las Moras Racing Team	BMW M3 GT4	4; 104	(Netherlands) Liesette Braams	A	All
(Netherlands) Las Moras Racing Team	BMW M3 GT4	4; 104	(Netherlands) Rob Severs	A	All
(Austria) Lechner Racing School	Lotus Evora GT4	5; 105	(Austria) Fabian Lauda	A	1–3
(Sweden) Alfab Racing	Aston Martin Vantage GT4	007; 107	(Sweden) Erik Behrens	P	All
(Sweden) Alfab Racing	Aston Martin Vantage GT4	007; 107	(Sweden) Daniel Roos	P	All
(France) BMW Espace Bienvenue	BMW M3 GT4	9; 109	(France) André Grammatico	A	All
(Germany) PROsport Performance	Porsche 911 GT4	10; 110	(Germany) Jörg Viebahn	P	2–5
(Germany) PROsport Performance	Porsche 911 GT4	10; 110	(Netherlands) Bertus Sanders	P	2–5
(Italy) Nova Race	Ginetta G50	11	(Italy) Giampiero Cristoni	G	1, 6
(Italy) Nova Race	Ginetta G50	11	(Italy) Renato di Amato	G	1
(Italy) Nova Race	Ginetta G50	11	(Norway) Leif Lødeng	G	6
(Italy) Nova Race	Ginetta G50	15; 888	(Spain) Salvador Tineo	G	1, 3–6
(Italy) Nova Race	Ginetta G50	15; 888	(Italy) Mark Speakerwas	G	1, 3
(Italy) Nova Race	Ginetta G50	15; 888	(Finland) Jesse Anttila	G	4–6
(Italy) Nova Race	Ginetta G50	16; 116	(Finland) Jesse Anttila	G	1, 3
(Italy) Nova Race	Ginetta G50	16; 116	(Argentina) Fran Viel Bugliotti	G	1, 3–6
(Italy) Nova Race	Ginetta G50	16; 116	(Italy) Mark Speakerwas	G	6
(Italy) Nova Race	Ginetta G50	18	(Germany) Jörg Viebahn	P	1
(Italy) Nova Race	Ginetta G50	18	(Netherlands) Bertus Sanders	P	1
(Italy) Nova Race	Ginetta G50	50	(Italy) Tiziano Frazza	G	1
(Italy) Nova Race	Ginetta G50	121	(Argentina) Andres Josephson	G	3
(Italy) Nova Race	Ginetta G50	121	(Italy) Lorenzo Bontempelli	G	3
(Italy) Nova Race	Ginetta G50	133	(Italy) Andrea Perlini	G	3
(Germany) Allied-Racing	BMW M3 GT4	12	(Germany) Jan Kasperlik	A	6
(Germany) Allied-Racing	BMW M3 GT4	12	(Austria) Dietmar Lackinger	A	6
(Italy) Nova Giudici	Ginetta G50	12	(Italy) Claudio Giudici	G	1
(Italy) Nova Giudici	Ginetta G50	13	(Italy) Gianni Giudici	G	1
(Italy) Nova Giudici	Ginetta G50	27	(Italy) Luca Magnoni	G	1
(Italy) Nova Giudici	Ginetta G50	33	(Italy) Andrea Perlini	G	1
(Italy) Nova Giudici	Ginetta G50	35	(Italy) Alessandra Brena	G	1
(Italy) Nova Giudici	Ginetta G50	35	(Italy) Walter Conforti	G	1
(Italy) Nova Rangoni (Rangoni Corse)	Ginetta G50	14; 114	(Italy) Manuel Lasagni	G	1, 3–6
(Italy) Nova Rangoni (Rangoni Corse)	Ginetta G50	14; 114	(Italy) Alessandro Bonacini	G	1, 4
(Italy) Nova Rangoni (Rangoni Corse)	Ginetta G50	24; 124	(Italy) Stefano Stefanelli	G	1, 3–6
(Italy) Nova Rangoni (Rangoni Corse)	Ginetta G50	24; 124	(Italy) Lorenzo Marcucci	G	1, 3–6
(Italy) Nova Rangoni (Rangoni Corse)	Ginetta G50	27; 127	(Italy) Luca Magnoni	G	3–6
(Italy) Nova Rangoni (Rangoni Corse)	Ginetta G50	32	(Italy) Tiziano Cappelletti	G	1
(Italy) Nova Rangoni (Rangoni Corse)	Ginetta G50	32	(Italy) Angelo Rogari	G	1
(Italy) Nova Rangoni (Rangoni Corse)	Ginetta G50	77; 177	(Italy) Roberto Gentili	G	1, 3–6
(Sweden) Ricknäs Motorsport	Porsche 911 GT4	18	(Denmark) Peter Larsen	A	6
(Sweden) Ricknäs Motorsport	Porsche 911 GT4	18	(Sweden) Håkan Ricknäs	A	6
(Sweden) Ricknäs Motorsport	Porsche 911 GT4	117	(Sweden) Håkan Ricknäs	A	3
(Sweden) Ricknäs Motorsport	Porsche 911 GT4	117	(Sweden) Magnus Holmström	A	3
(United Kingdom) Genesee Reflex Racing	Ginetta G50	28	(Spain) Marcos Vivian	P	1
(United Kingdom) Genesee Reflex Racing	Ginetta G50	28	(United Kingdom) Luciano Bacheta	P	1
(Portugal) Veloso Motorsport	Aston Martin Vantage GT4	33	(Portugal) Eugenio Montez	A	6
(Portugal) Veloso Motorsport	Aston Martin Vantage GT4	33	(Portugal) Sergio Montez	A	6
(Netherlands) Cor Euser Racing	Lotus Evora GT4	106	(Spain) Marcos Vivian	P	2
(Netherlands) Cor Euser Racing	Lotus Evora GT4	106	(Netherlands) Cor Euser	P	2
(Sweden) Primus Racing	Ginetta G50	119	(Sweden) Johan Rosén	A	3
(Sweden) Primus Racing	Ginetta G50	119	(Denmark) Peter Larsen	A	3
(United Kingdom) Optimum Motorsport	Ginetta G55	120	(United Kingdom) Lee Mowle	A	3
(Netherlands) Nissan Nederland	Nissan 370Z GT4	123	(Netherlands) Frans Verschuur	A	2
(Netherlands) Nissan Nederland	Nissan 370Z GT4	123	(Netherlands) Bernhard ten Brinke	A	2
Guest teams and drivers
(Germany) Sorg Rennsport	BMW M3 GT4	101	(Sweden) Erik Berggren	I	5
(Germany) Sorg Rennsport	BMW M3 GT4	101	(Denmark) Thomas Fjordbach	I	5
(Germany) Bremotion Sport	Roding R1	102	(Germany) Patrick Brenndörfer	I	5
(Netherlands) Rijmarracing	BMW M3 GT4	103	(Netherlands) Peter Stox	I	5
(Netherlands) Rijmarracing	BMW M3 GT4	103	(Netherlands) Koen de Wit	I	5
(Netherlands) Rijmarracing	BMW M3 GT4	104	(Netherlands) Marcel van Rijswick	I	5
(Netherlands) Rijmarracing	BMW M3 GT4	104	(Netherlands) Andre de Vries	I	5
(Germany) Mathol Racing	Aston Martin Vantage GT4	107	(Germany) Steffen Retzlaff	I	5
(Germany) Mathol Racing	Aston Martin Vantage GT4	107	(Germany) Hendrik Still	I	5

Icon	Class
P	Pro
A	Am
G	Ginetta G50
I	Invitation

- Drivers competing in the Ginetta G50 class were ineligible for points.

== Race calendar and results ==
Round		Circuit	Date	Pole position	PRO winners	Overall winners
1	R1	Misano	10 May	(Netherlands) No. 1 Racing Team Holland by Ekris Motorsport	(Netherlands) No. 1 Racing Team Holland by Ekris Motorsport	(Italy) No. 14 Nova Rangoni
1	R1	Misano	10 May	(Netherlands) Bernhard van Oranje (Netherlands) Ricardo van der Ende	(Netherlands) Bernhard van Oranje (Netherlands) Ricardo van der Ende	(Italy) Manuel Lasagni (Italy) Alessandro Bonacini
1	R2	Misano	11 May	(Italy) No. 16 Nova Race	(Italy) No. 18 Nova Race	(Italy) No. 18 Nova Race
1	R2	Misano	11 May	(Finland) Jesse Anttila (Argentina) Fran Viel Bugliotti	(Germany) Jörg Viebahn (Netherlands) Bertus Sanders	(Germany) Jörg Viebahn (Netherlands) Bertus Sanders
2	R1	Zandvoort	5 July	(Netherlands) No. 101 Racing Team Holland by Ekris Motorsport	(Netherlands) No. 101 Racing Team Holland by Ekris Motorsport	(Netherlands) No. 101 Racing Team Holland by Ekris Motorsport
2	R1	Zandvoort	5 July	(Netherlands) Bernhard van Oranje (Netherlands) Ricardo van der Ende	(Netherlands) Bernhard van Oranje (Netherlands) Ricardo van der Ende	(Netherlands) Bernhard van Oranje (Netherlands) Ricardo van der Ende
2	R2	Zandvoort	6 July	(Netherlands) No. 101 Racing Team Holland by Ekris Motorsport	(Netherlands) No. 101 Racing Team Holland by Ekris Motorsport	(Netherlands) No. 101 Racing Team Holland by Ekris Motorsport
2	R2	Zandvoort	6 July	(Netherlands) Bernhard van Oranje (Netherlands) Ricardo van der Ende	(Netherlands) Bernhard van Oranje (Netherlands) Ricardo van der Ende	(Netherlands) Bernhard van Oranje (Netherlands) Ricardo van der Ende
3	R1	Spa-Francorchamps	25 July	(Germany) No. 110 PROsport Performance	(Netherlands) No. 101 Racing Team Holland by Ekris Motorsport	(Netherlands) No. 101 Racing Team Holland by Ekris Motorsport
3	R1	Spa-Francorchamps	25 July	(Germany) Jörg Viebahn (Netherlands) Bertus Sanders	(Netherlands) Bernhard van Oranje (Netherlands) Ricardo van der Ende	(Netherlands) Bernhard van Oranje (Netherlands) Ricardo van der Ende
3	R2	Spa-Francorchamps	26 July	(Netherlands) No. 102 V8 Racing	(Netherlands) No. 103 V8 Racing	(Netherlands) No. 103 V8 Racing
3	R2	Spa-Francorchamps	26 July	(Netherlands) Luc Braams (Netherlands) Duncan Huisman	(Netherlands) Marcel Nooren (Netherlands) Jan Joris Verheul	(Netherlands) Marcel Nooren (Netherlands) Jan Joris Verheul
4	R1	Paul Ricard	31 August	(Sweden) No. 7 Alfab Racing	(Netherlands) No. 3 Las Moras Racing Team (V8 Racing)	(Italy) No. 888 Nova Race
4	R1	Paul Ricard	31 August	(Sweden) Erik Behrens (Sweden) Daniel Roos	(Netherlands) Marcel Nooren (Netherlands) Jan Joris Verheul	(Spain) Salvador Tineo (Finland) Jesse Anttila
4	R2	Paul Ricard	31 August	(Sweden) No. 7 Alfab Racing	(Germany) No. 10 PROsport Performance	(Germany) No. 10 PROsport Performance
4	R2	Paul Ricard	31 August	(Sweden) Erik Behrens (Sweden) Daniel Roos	(Germany) Jörg Viebahn (Netherlands) Bertus Sanders	(Germany) Jörg Viebahn (Netherlands) Bertus Sanders
5	R1	Nürburgring	20 September	(Italy) No. 24 Nova Rangoni (Rangoni Corse)	(Netherlands) No. 2 Las Moras Racing Team (V8 Racing)	(Netherlands) No. 2 Las Moras Racing Team (V8 Racing)
5	R1	Nürburgring	20 September	(Italy) Stefano Stefanelli (Italy) Lorenzo Marcucci	(Netherlands) Luc Braams (Netherlands) Duncan Huisman	(Netherlands) Luc Braams (Netherlands) Duncan Huisman
5	R2	Nürburgring	20 September	(Netherlands) No. 3 Las Moras Racing Team (V8 Racing)	(Netherlands) No. 1 Racing Team Holland by Ekris Motorsport	(Italy) No. 16 Nova Race
5	R2	Nürburgring	20 September	(Netherlands) Marcel Nooren (Netherlands) Jan Joris Verheul	(Netherlands) Bernhard van Oranje (Netherlands) Ricardo van der Ende	(Argentina) Fran Viel Bugliotti
6	R1	Monza	25 October	(Sweden) No. 7 Alfab Racing	(Sweden) No. 7 Alfab Racing	(Sweden) No. 7 Alfab Racing
6	R1	Monza	25 October	(Sweden) Erik Behrens (Sweden) Daniel Roos	(Sweden) Erik Behrens (Sweden) Daniel Roos	(Sweden) Erik Behrens (Sweden) Daniel Roos
6	R2	Monza	26 October	(Italy) No. 14 Nova Rangoni (Rangoni Corse)	(Netherlands) No. 8 Racing Team Holland by Ekris Motorsport	(Italy) No. 14 Nova Rangoni (Rangoni Corse)
6	R2	Monza	26 October	(Italy) Manuel Lasagni	(Germany) Jörg Viebahn (Netherlands) Simon Knap	(Italy) Manuel Lasagni
