= 2016 GT4 European Series =

Seasons
- ← 2015 2017 (Northern Cup); 2017 (Southern Cup) →

The 2016 Competition102 GT4 European Series was the ninth season of the GT4 European Series, a sports car championship created and organised by the Stéphane Ratel Organisation (SRO). The season began on 23 April at Autodromo Nazionale Monza and finished on 9 October at Circuit Park Zandvoort after six race weekends.

== Calendar ==
On 21 January 2016, the series announced the 2016 calendar.

Round		Circuit	Length	Date	Event
1	R1	Autodromo Nazionale Monza, Monza, Italy	50 min + 1 lap	23 April	Blancpain GT Series Endurance Cup
1	R2	Autodromo Nazionale Monza, Monza, Italy	50 min + 1 lap	24 April	Blancpain GT Series Endurance Cup
2	R1	Circuit de Pau-Ville, Pau, France	50 min + 1 lap	14 May	Pau Grand Prix
2	R2	Circuit de Pau-Ville, Pau, France	50 min + 1 lap	15 May	Pau Grand Prix
3		(United Kingdom) Silverstone Circuit, Silverstone, Great Britain	3 hours	12 June	British GT
4		Circuit de Spa-Francorchamps, Spa, Belgium	2 hours	10 July	British GT
5	R1	Hungaroring, Mogyoród, Hungary	50 min + 1 lap	24 September	DTM
5	R2	Hungaroring, Mogyoród, Hungary	50 min + 1 lap	25 September	DTM
6	R1	Circuit Park Zandvoort, North Holland, Netherlands	50 min + 1 lap	9 October	Finaleraces
6	R2	Circuit Park Zandvoort, North Holland, Netherlands	50 min + 1 lap	9 October	Finaleraces

== Entry list ==
For the rounds held in conjunction with British GT, GT4 European Series contenders entered with their usual car numbers, but with 100 added up to it.

Team	Car	No.	Drivers	Class	Rounds
(Netherlands) V8 Racing International	Chevrolet Camaro GT4	1	(Netherlands) Marcel Nooren	P	1–3
(Netherlands) V8 Racing International	Chevrolet Camaro GT4	1	(Netherlands) Jelle Beelen	P	1, 3
(Netherlands) V8 Racing International	Chevrolet Camaro GT4	1	(Netherlands) Donald Molenaar	P	2
(Netherlands) V8 Racing International	Chevrolet Camaro GT4	2	(Netherlands) Luc Braams	P	1–3
(Netherlands) V8 Racing International	Chevrolet Camaro GT4	2	(Netherlands) Duncan Huisman	P	1–3
(Netherlands) V8 Racing International	Aston Martin V8 Vantage GT4	4	(Netherlands) Jelle Beelen	P	4
(Netherlands) V8 Racing International	Aston Martin V8 Vantage GT4	4	(Netherlands) Marcel Nooren	P	4
(Netherlands) V8 Racing International	Aston Martin V8 Vantage GT4	5	(Netherlands) Luc Braams	P	4
(Netherlands) V8 Racing International	Aston Martin V8 Vantage GT4	5	(Netherlands) Duncan Huisman	P	4
(Netherlands) Las Moras Racing Team	BMW M3 GT4	3	(Netherlands) Liesette Braams	A	3
(Netherlands) Las Moras Racing Team	BMW M3 GT4	3	(Netherlands) Frans Verschuur	A	3
(Belgium) Street Art Racing	Aston Martin V8 Vantage GT4	7	(France) Jérôme Demay	A	All
(Belgium) Street Art Racing	Aston Martin V8 Vantage GT4	7	(Belgium) Albert Bloem	A	1–3
(Belgium) Street Art Racing	Aston Martin V8 Vantage GT4	7	(Belgium) Damien Dupont	A	4–6
(Netherlands) Racing Team Holland by Ekris Motorsport	Ekris M4 GT4	8	(Netherlands) Simon Knap	P	All
(Netherlands) Racing Team Holland by Ekris Motorsport	Ekris M4 GT4	8	(Netherlands) Rob Severs	P	All
(Netherlands) Racing Team Holland by Ekris Motorsport	Ekris M4 GT4	9	(Netherlands) Ricardo van der Ende (Note: Bernhard van Oranje crashed during Free Practice 1 at Pau causing the Ekris team to withdraw the No. 9 car, because the damage could not be fixed in time for the races on Saturday and Sunday. Van Oranje did not race, but Ricardo van der Ende was able to team up with solo driver André Grammatico in the No. 17 BMW Espace Bienvenue car.)	P	All
(Netherlands) Racing Team Holland by Ekris Motorsport	Ekris M4 GT4	9	(Netherlands) Bernhard van Oranje	P	All
(Netherlands) NMT Racing Team	BMW M3 GT4	10	(Netherlands) Tristan Boorsma	A	6
(Netherlands) NMT Racing Team	BMW M3 GT4	10	(Netherlands) Yorick Boorsma	A	6
(Bulgaria) Sofia Car Motorsport	SIN R1 GT4	11	(Germany) Hendrik Still	P	1–3
(Bulgaria) Sofia Car Motorsport	SIN R1 GT4	11	(Germany) Andreas Gülden	P	1–2
(Bulgaria) Sofia Car Motorsport	SIN R1 GT4	11	(United Kingdom) Michael Epps	P	3
(Bulgaria) Sofia Car Motorsport	SIN R1 GT4	11	(Netherlands) Tim Coronel	P	4
(Bulgaria) Sofia Car Motorsport	SIN R1 GT4	11	(Netherlands) Pieter-Christiaan van Oranje	P	4
(Bulgaria) Sofia Car Motorsport	SIN R1 GT4	11	(Romania) Nicolae Sergiu George	A	5–6
(Bulgaria) Sofia Car Motorsport	SIN R1 GT4	11	(United Kingdom) Christopher Chadwick	A	5
(Bulgaria) Sofia Car Motorsport	SIN R1 GT4	11	(Romania) Eduard Anton	A	6
(Germany) / RYS Team KTM (Note: Car No. 14 entered as RYS Team KTM, car No. 24 entered as RYS Team Holinger, car No. 34 entered as RYS Team KISKA, car No. 44 entered as RYS Team WP, car No. 54 entered as RYS Team Pankl, car No. 64 entered as RYS Team InterNetX, car No. 74 entered as RYS Team True Racing and car No. 84 entered as RYS Team Hohenberg.); (Germany) / RYS Team Holinger; (Germany) / RYS Team KISKA; (Germany) / RYS Team WP; (Germany) / RYS Team Pankl; (Germany) / RYS Team InterNetX; (Germany) / RYS Team True Racing; (Germany) / RYS Team Hohenberg	KTM X-Bow GT4	14	(Austria) Laura Kraihamer	P	1–2, 4–6
(Germany) / RYS Team KTM; (Germany) / RYS Team Holinger; (Germany) / RYS Team KISKA; (Germany) / RYS Team WP; (Germany) / RYS Team Pankl; (Germany) / RYS Team InterNetX; (Germany) / RYS Team True Racing; (Germany) / RYS Team Hohenberg	KTM X-Bow GT4	14	(Belgium) Jamie Vandenbalck	P	1–2, 4–6
(Germany) / RYS Team KTM; (Germany) / RYS Team Holinger; (Germany) / RYS Team KISKA; (Germany) / RYS Team WP; (Germany) / RYS Team Pankl; (Germany) / RYS Team InterNetX; (Germany) / RYS Team True Racing; (Germany) / RYS Team Hohenberg	KTM X-Bow GT4	24	(Germany) Lennart Marioneck	P	1–2, 4–6
(Germany) / RYS Team KTM; (Germany) / RYS Team Holinger; (Germany) / RYS Team KISKA; (Germany) / RYS Team WP; (Germany) / RYS Team Pankl; (Germany) / RYS Team InterNetX; (Germany) / RYS Team True Racing; (Germany) / RYS Team Hohenberg	KTM X-Bow GT4	24	(Germany) Tim Stupple	P	1–2, 4–6
(Germany) / RYS Team KTM; (Germany) / RYS Team Holinger; (Germany) / RYS Team KISKA; (Germany) / RYS Team WP; (Germany) / RYS Team Pankl; (Germany) / RYS Team InterNetX; (Germany) / RYS Team True Racing; (Germany) / RYS Team Hohenberg	KTM X-Bow GT4	34	(Australia) Caitlin Wood	P	1–2, 4–6
(Germany) / RYS Team KTM; (Germany) / RYS Team Holinger; (Germany) / RYS Team KISKA; (Germany) / RYS Team WP; (Germany) / RYS Team Pankl; (Germany) / RYS Team InterNetX; (Germany) / RYS Team True Racing; (Germany) / RYS Team Hohenberg	KTM X-Bow GT4	34	(Germany) Maximilian Voelker	P	1, 4
(Germany) / RYS Team KTM; (Germany) / RYS Team Holinger; (Germany) / RYS Team KISKA; (Germany) / RYS Team WP; (Germany) / RYS Team Pankl; (Germany) / RYS Team InterNetX; (Germany) / RYS Team True Racing; (Germany) / RYS Team Hohenberg	KTM X-Bow GT4	34	(Finland) Marko Helistekangas	P	2
(Germany) / RYS Team KTM; (Germany) / RYS Team Holinger; (Germany) / RYS Team KISKA; (Germany) / RYS Team WP; (Germany) / RYS Team Pankl; (Germany) / RYS Team InterNetX; (Germany) / RYS Team True Racing; (Germany) / RYS Team Hohenberg	KTM X-Bow GT4	34	(Switzerland) Cédric Freiburghaus	P	5
(Germany) / RYS Team KTM; (Germany) / RYS Team Holinger; (Germany) / RYS Team KISKA; (Germany) / RYS Team WP; (Germany) / RYS Team Pankl; (Germany) / RYS Team InterNetX; (Germany) / RYS Team True Racing; (Germany) / RYS Team Hohenberg	KTM X-Bow GT4	34	(Belgium) Naomi Schiff	P	6
(Germany) / RYS Team KTM; (Germany) / RYS Team Holinger; (Germany) / RYS Team KISKA; (Germany) / RYS Team WP; (Germany) / RYS Team Pankl; (Germany) / RYS Team InterNetX; (Germany) / RYS Team True Racing; (Germany) / RYS Team Hohenberg	KTM X-Bow GT4	44	(United Kingdom) Rebecca Jackson	P	1–2, 4–6
(Germany) / RYS Team KTM; (Germany) / RYS Team Holinger; (Germany) / RYS Team KISKA; (Germany) / RYS Team WP; (Germany) / RYS Team Pankl; (Germany) / RYS Team InterNetX; (Germany) / RYS Team True Racing; (Germany) / RYS Team Hohenberg	KTM X-Bow GT4	44	(Denmark) Thomas Krebs	P	1–2, 4–6
(Germany) / RYS Team KTM; (Germany) / RYS Team Holinger; (Germany) / RYS Team KISKA; (Germany) / RYS Team WP; (Germany) / RYS Team Pankl; (Germany) / RYS Team InterNetX; (Germany) / RYS Team True Racing; (Germany) / RYS Team Hohenberg	KTM X-Bow GT4	54	(Finland) Marko Helistekangas	P	1, 4–6
(Germany) / RYS Team KTM; (Germany) / RYS Team Holinger; (Germany) / RYS Team KISKA; (Germany) / RYS Team WP; (Germany) / RYS Team Pankl; (Germany) / RYS Team InterNetX; (Germany) / RYS Team True Racing; (Germany) / RYS Team Hohenberg	KTM X-Bow GT4	54	(Germany) Doreen Seidel	P	1, 4–6
(Germany) / RYS Team KTM; (Germany) / RYS Team Holinger; (Germany) / RYS Team KISKA; (Germany) / RYS Team WP; (Germany) / RYS Team Pankl; (Germany) / RYS Team InterNetX; (Germany) / RYS Team True Racing; (Germany) / RYS Team Hohenberg	KTM X-Bow GT4	64	(Germany) Immanuel Vinke	P	1–2, 4–6
(Germany) / RYS Team KTM; (Germany) / RYS Team Holinger; (Germany) / RYS Team KISKA; (Germany) / RYS Team WP; (Germany) / RYS Team Pankl; (Germany) / RYS Team InterNetX; (Germany) / RYS Team True Racing; (Germany) / RYS Team Hohenberg	KTM X-Bow GT4	64	(New Zealand) Chris Vlok	P	1–2, 4–6
(Germany) / RYS Team KTM; (Germany) / RYS Team Holinger; (Germany) / RYS Team KISKA; (Germany) / RYS Team WP; (Germany) / RYS Team Pankl; (Germany) / RYS Team InterNetX; (Germany) / RYS Team True Racing; (Germany) / RYS Team Hohenberg	KTM X-Bow GT4	74	(Switzerland) Cédric Freiburghaus	P	1–2, 4–6
(Germany) / RYS Team KTM; (Germany) / RYS Team Holinger; (Germany) / RYS Team KISKA; (Germany) / RYS Team WP; (Germany) / RYS Team Pankl; (Germany) / RYS Team InterNetX; (Germany) / RYS Team True Racing; (Germany) / RYS Team Hohenberg	KTM X-Bow GT4	74	(Norway) Anna Rathe	P	1–2, 4–6
(Germany) / RYS Team KTM; (Germany) / RYS Team Holinger; (Germany) / RYS Team KISKA; (Germany) / RYS Team WP; (Germany) / RYS Team Pankl; (Germany) / RYS Team InterNetX; (Germany) / RYS Team True Racing; (Germany) / RYS Team Hohenberg	KTM X-Bow GT4	84	(Poland) Maciej Dreszer	P	1–2, 4–6
(Germany) / RYS Team KTM; (Germany) / RYS Team Holinger; (Germany) / RYS Team KISKA; (Germany) / RYS Team WP; (Germany) / RYS Team Pankl; (Germany) / RYS Team InterNetX; (Germany) / RYS Team True Racing; (Germany) / RYS Team Hohenberg	KTM X-Bow GT4	84	(Norway) Mads Siljehaug	P	1–2, 4–6
(France) BMW Espace Bienvenue	BMW M3 GT4	17	(France) André Grammatico	A	1
(France) BMW Espace Bienvenue	BMW M3 GT4	17	(France) André Grammatico	P	2
(France) BMW Espace Bienvenue	BMW M3 GT4	17	(Netherlands) Ricardo van der Ende	P	2
(Germany) PROsport Performance	Porsche Cayman PRO4 GT4	18	(Germany) Peter Terting	P	All
(Germany) PROsport Performance	Porsche Cayman PRO4 GT4	18	(Czech Republic) Daniel Rymes	P	1
(Germany) PROsport Performance	Porsche Cayman PRO4 GT4	18	(Germany) Jörg Viebahn	P	2–6
(Germany) PROsport Performance	Porsche Cayman PRO4 GT4	19	(Germany) Mike Hansch	P	1
(Germany) PROsport Performance	Porsche Cayman PRO4 GT4	19	(Germany) Jörg Viebahn	P	1
(Germany) PROsport Performance	Porsche Cayman PRO4 GT4	19	(Denmark) Nicolaj Møller Madsen	P	2–6
(Germany) PROsport Performance	Porsche Cayman PRO4 GT4	19	(Germany) Andreas Patzelt	P	2–6
(Germany) PROsport Performance	Porsche Cayman PRO4 GT4	20	(Germany) Carsten Struwe	I	1
(Germany) PROsport Performance	Porsche Cayman PRO4 GT4	20	(United Kingdom) Riki Christodoulou	A	3
(Germany) PROsport Performance	Porsche Cayman PRO4 GT4	20	(Germany) Mike Hansch	A	3
(Germany) PROsport Performance	Porsche Cayman GT4 Clubsport	20	(Germany) Hendrik Still	P	4
(Germany) PROsport Performance	Porsche Cayman GT4 Clubsport	20	(Germany) Carsten Struwe	P	4
(Germany) PROsport Performance	Porsche Cayman PRO4 GT4	20	(United Kingdom) Riki Christodoulou	A	5
(Germany) PROsport Performance	Porsche Cayman PRO4 GT4	20	(Germany) Carsten Struwe	A	5
(Germany) PROsport Performance	Porsche Cayman PRO4 GT4	21	(United Kingdom) Riki Christodoulou	A	4, 6
(Germany) PROsport Performance	Porsche Cayman PRO4 GT4	21	(Germany) Mike Hansch	A	4
(Germany) PROsport Performance	Porsche Cayman PRO4 GT4	21	(Germany) Carsten Struwe	A	6
(Germany) / Allied Racing (Note: Cars No. 22 and 29 entered as Allied Racing, car No. 28 entered as Allied Racing until Round 4 and as Las Moras by Allied Racing at Rounds 5 and 6.); (Germany) / Las Moras by Allied Racing	Porsche Cayman GT4 Clubsport	22	(Germany) Jan Kasperlik	A	5–6
(Germany) / Allied Racing; (Germany) / Las Moras by Allied Racing	BMW M3 GT4	28	(Germany) Jan Kasperlik	A	1–4
(Germany) / Allied Racing; (Germany) / Las Moras by Allied Racing	BMW M3 GT4	28	(Austria) Dietmar Lackinger	A	1–4
(Germany) / Allied Racing; (Germany) / Las Moras by Allied Racing	BMW M3 GT4	28	(Netherlands) Liesette Braams	A	5–6
(Germany) / Allied Racing; (Germany) / Las Moras by Allied Racing	BMW M3 GT4	28	(Netherlands) Gaby Uljee	A	5–6
(Germany) / Allied Racing; (Germany) / Las Moras by Allied Racing	BMW M3 GT4	29	(San Marino) Paolo Meloni	A	4
(Germany) / Allied Racing; (Germany) / Las Moras by Allied Racing	BMW M3 GT4	29	(Italy) Massimilliano Tresoldi	A	4
(Italy) V-Action Racing Team	Maserati GranTurismo MC GT4	25	(Finland) Juuso-Matti Pajuranta	P	4
(Italy) V-Action Racing Team	Maserati GranTurismo MC GT4	25	(Portugal) Jorge Rodrigues	P	4
(Italy) Maserati Spa	Maserati GranTurismo MC GT4	27	(Italy) Alessandro Iazzetti	A	1
(Italy) Maserati Spa	Maserati GranTurismo MC GT4	46	(France) Romain Monti	P	1
(France) CMR	Ginetta G55 GT4	30	(France) Éric Cayrolle	A	2
(France) CMR	Ginetta G55 GT4	30	(France) Didier Moureu	A	2
(Switzerland) Swiss Team	Maserati GranTurismo MC GT4	35	(Switzerland) Mauro Calamia	P	All
(Switzerland) Swiss Team	Maserati GranTurismo MC GT4	35	(Italy) Giuseppe Fascicolo	P	All
(Switzerland) Swiss Team	Maserati GranTurismo MC GT4	36	(San Marino) Paolo Meloni	A	5
(Switzerland) Swiss Team	Maserati GranTurismo MC GT4	36	(Italy) Massimilliano Tresoldi	A	5
(United Kingdom) Brookspeed	Porsche Cayman GT4 Clubsport	40	(United Kingdom) Steven Liquorish	A	2–6
(United Kingdom) Brookspeed	Porsche Cayman GT4 Clubsport	40	(United Kingdom) Graeme Mundy	A	2–6
(United Kingdom) Brookspeed	Porsche Cayman GT4 Clubsport	41	(Netherlands) Luc Braams	P	5–6
(United Kingdom) Brookspeed	Porsche Cayman GT4 Clubsport	41	(Netherlands) Duncan Huisman	P	5–6
(Italy) Villorba Corse	Maserati GranTurismo MC GT4	50	(Poland) Antoni Chodzen	A	1, 3–6
(Italy) Villorba Corse	Maserati GranTurismo MC GT4	50	(Poland) Piotr Chodzen	A	1, 3–6
(Italy) Villorba Corse	Maserati GranTurismo MC GT4	66	(Poland) Łukasz Habaj	I	3
(Italy) Villorba Corse	Maserati GranTurismo MC GT4	66	(Poland) Lucasz Kreski	I	3
(Italy) Villorba Corse	Maserati GranTurismo MC GT4	77	(Italy) Alessandro Fogliani	A	1–2
(Italy) Villorba Corse	Maserati GranTurismo MC GT4	77	(Italy) Patrick Zamparini	A	1–2
(Italy) Villorba Corse	Maserati GranTurismo MC GT4	90	(Italy) Luca Anselmi	P	All
(Italy) Villorba Corse	Maserati GranTurismo MC GT4	90	(Italy) Giorgio Sernagiotto	P	1, 3
(Italy) Villorba Corse	Maserati GranTurismo MC GT4	90	(France) Michael Blanchemain	P	2, 4
(Italy) Villorba Corse	Maserati GranTurismo MC GT4	90	(Italy) Patrick Zamparini	P	5–6
(Sweden) Primus Racing	Ginetta G55 GT4	51	(Sweden) Peter Larsen	A	5
(Sweden) Primus Racing	Ginetta G55 GT4	51	(Sweden) Johan Rosén	A	5
(Belgium) Delahaye Racing Team	Porsche Cayman GT4 Clubsport	58	(France) Pierre-Etienne Bordet	A	4
(Belgium) Delahaye Racing Team	Porsche Cayman GT4 Clubsport	58	(France) Alexandre Viron	A	4
(United Kingdom) Academy Motorsport	Aston Martin V8 Vantage GT4	62	(United Kingdom) Will Moore	P	6
(United Kingdom) Academy Motorsport	Aston Martin V8 Vantage GT4	62	(Sweden) Dennis Strandberg	P	6
(Sweden) Bald Eagle Racing	BMW M3 GT4	67	(Sweden) Kari Mäkinen	A	5
(Sweden) Bald Eagle Racing	BMW M3 GT4	67	(Sweden) Oskar Krüger	A	5
(Poland) eSKY INVENTO Racing Team	Maserati GranTurismo MC GT4	69	(Poland) Łukasz Kręski	A	4
(Poland) eSKY INVENTO Racing Team	Maserati GranTurismo MC GT4	69	(Poland) Maciej Marcinkiewicz	A	4
(Netherlands) Racing Team Holland by Intercar	BMW M3 GT4	72	(Netherlands) Tim Coronel	P	1, 6
(Netherlands) Racing Team Holland by Intercar	BMW M3 GT4	72	(Netherlands) Pieter-Christiaan van Oranje	P	1, 6
(Italy) Autorlando Sport	Porsche 997 GT4	76	(Italy) Giuseppe Ghezzi	A	1, 3–6
(Italy) Autorlando Sport	Porsche 997 GT4	76	(Italy) Alessandro Giovanelli	A	1, 3–6
(United Kingdom) Pall-Ex Slidesport Motorsport	Porsche Cayman GT4 Clubsport	99	(United Kingdom) David Fairbrother	A	4–5
(United Kingdom) Pall-Ex Slidesport Motorsport	Porsche Cayman GT4 Clubsport	99	(United Kingdom) Wayne Marrs	A	4–5
(United Kingdom) Generation AMR Super Racing	Aston Martin V8 Vantage GT4	144	(United Kingdom) Matthew George	P	6
(United Kingdom) Generation AMR Super Racing	Aston Martin V8 Vantage GT4	144	(United Kingdom) James Holder	P	6

Icon	Class
P	Pro
A	Amateur
I	Invitation

== Race results ==
Bold indicates overall winner.

Round		Circuit	Pole position	Pro Winners	Am Winners
1	R1	(Italy) Monza	(Netherlands) No. 9 Racing Team Holland by Ekris Motorsport	**(Italy) No. 90 Villorba Corse**	(Italy) No. 77 Villorba Corse
1	R1	(Italy) Monza	(Netherlands) Ricardo van der Ende (Netherlands) Bernhard van Oranje	**(Italy) Luca Anselmi** **(Italy) Giorgio Sernagiotto**	(Italy) Alessandro Fogliani (Italy) Patrick Zamparini
1	R2	(Italy) Monza	(Bulgaria) No. 11 Sofia Car Motorsport	**(Italy) No. 46 Maserati Spa**	(Italy) No. 76 Autorlando Sport
1	R2	(Italy) Monza	(Germany) Andreas Gülden (Germany) Hendrik Still	**(France) Romain Monti**	(Italy) Giuseppe Ghezzi (Italy) Alessandro Giovanelli
2	R1	(France) Pau	(Germany) No. 19 PROsport Performance	**(Germany) No. 18 PROsport Performance**	(Germany) No. 28 Allied Racing
2	R1	(France) Pau	(Denmark) Nicolaj Møller Madsen (Germany) Andreas Patzelt	**(Germany) Peter Terting** **(Germany) Jörg Viebahn**	(Germany) Jan Kasperlik (Austria) Dietmar Lackinger
2	R2	(France) Pau	(Germany) No. 19 PROsport Performance	**(Germany) No. 19 PROsport Performance**	(Germany) No. 28 Allied Racing
2	R2	(France) Pau	(Denmark) Nicolaj Møller Madsen (Germany) Andreas Patzelt	**(Denmark) Nicolaj Møller Madsen** **(Germany) Andreas Patzelt**	(Germany) Jan Kasperlik (Austria) Dietmar Lackinger
3		(United Kingdom) Silverstone	(Netherlands) No. 109 Racing Team Holland by Ekris Motorsport	**(Germany) No. 118 PROsport Performance**	(Italy) No. 176 Autorlando Sport
3		(United Kingdom) Silverstone	(Netherlands) Ricardo van der Ende (Netherlands) Bernhard van Oranje	**(Germany) Peter Terting** **(Germany) Jörg Viebahn**	(Italy) Giuseppe Ghezzi (Italy) Alessandro Giovanelli
4		(Belgium) Spa-Francorchamps	(Netherlands) No. 108 Racing Team Holland by Ekris Motorsport	(Germany) No. 184 RYS Team Hohenberg	**(Belgium) No. 107 Street Art Racing**
4		(Belgium) Spa-Francorchamps	(Netherlands) Simon Knap (Netherlands) Rob Severs	(Poland) Maciej Dreszer (Norway) Mads Siljehaug	**(France) Jérôme Demay** **(Belgium) Damien Dupont**
5	R1	(Hungary) Hungaroring	(Italy) No. 90 Villorba Corse	**(Germany) No. 18 PROsport Performance**	(Germany) No. 21 PROsport Performance
5	R1	(Hungary) Hungaroring	(Italy) Luca Anselmi (Italy) Patrick Zamparini	**(Germany) Peter Terting** **(Germany) Jörg Viebahn**	(United Kingdom) Riki Christodoulou (Germany) Carsten Struwe
5	R2	(Hungary) Hungaroring	(Italy) No. 90 Villorba Corse	**(Italy) No. 90 Villorba Corse**	(Belgium) No. 7 Street Art Racing
5	R2	(Hungary) Hungaroring	(Italy) Luca Anselmi (Italy) Patrick Zamparini	**(Italy) Luca Anselmi** **(Italy) Patrick Zamparini**	(France) Jérôme Demay (Belgium) Damien Dupont
6	R1	(Netherlands) Zandvoort	(United Kingdom) No. 41 Brookspeed	**(Germany) No. 84 RYS Team Hohenberg**	(Belgium) No. 7 Street Art Racing
6	R1	(Netherlands) Zandvoort	(Netherlands) Luc Braams (Netherlands) Duncan Huisman	**(Poland) Maciej Dreszer** **(Norway) Mads Siljehaug**	(France) Jérôme Demay (Belgium) Damien Dupont
6	R2	(Netherlands) Zandvoort	(Netherlands) No. 9 Racing Team Holland by Ekris Motorsport	**(Netherlands) No. 8 Racing Team Holland by Ekris Motorsport**	(Netherlands) No. 10 NMT Racing Team
6	R2	(Netherlands) Zandvoort	(Netherlands) Ricardo van der Ende (Netherlands) Bernhard van Oranje	**(Netherlands) Simon Knap** **(Netherlands) Rob Severs**	(Netherlands) Tristan Boorsma (Netherlands) Yorick Boorsma

== Championship standings ==
Scoring system

Points were awarded based on finishing positions as shown in the chart below. Entries were required to complete 75% of the winning car's race distance in order to be classified and earn points.

Monza, Pau, Hungaroring and Zandvoort

Position	**1st**	**2nd**	**3rd**	**4th**	**5th**	**6th**	**7th**	**8th**	**9th**	**10th**
Points	25	18	15	12	10	8	6	4	2	1

Silverstone and Spa-Francorchamps

Position	**1st**	**2nd**	**3rd**	**4th**	**5th**	**6th**	**7th**	**8th**	**9th**	**10th**
Points	37.5	27	22.5	18	15	12	9	6	3	1.5

=== Drivers' championship ===
Pos.	Driver	Team	MNZ (Italy)		PAU (France)		SIL (United Kingdom)	SPA (Belgium)	HUN (Hungary)		ZAN (Netherlands)		Points
Pro Class
1	(Germany) Peter Terting	(Germany) PROsport Performance	14	17	1	Ret	1	3	1	3	8	11	141.5
1	(Germany) Jörg Viebahn	(Germany) PROsport Performance	20	23	1	Ret	1	3	1	3	8	11	141.5
2	(Poland) Maciej Dreszer (Norway) Mads Siljehaug	(Germany) RYS Team Hohenberg	EX	Ret	3	Ret		2	4	8	1	3	112.5
3	(Denmark) Nicolaj Møller Madsen (Germany) Andreas Patzelt	(Germany) PROsport Performance			**2**	**1**	2	6	8	7	13	10	109
4	(Italy) Luca Anselmi	(Italy) Villorba Corse	1	8	9	10	4	Ret	**20**	**1**	5	4	108
5	(Netherlands) Ricardo van der Ende	(Netherlands) Racing Team Holland by Ekris Motorsport	**2**	6	WD	WD	**6**	Ret	3	12	2	**2**	106
5	(Netherlands) Ricardo van der Ende	(France) BMW Espace Bienvenue			6	15							106
6	(Netherlands) Simon Knap (Netherlands) Rob Severs	(Netherlands) Racing Team Holland by Ekris Motorsport	3	9	Ret	DNS	3	**Ret**	2	Ret	3	1	101.5
7	(Netherlands) Bernhard van Oranje	(Netherlands) Racing Team Holland by Ekris Motorsport	**2**	6	WD	WD	**6**	Ret	3	12	2	**2**	95
8	(Netherlands) Luc Braams (Netherlands) Duncan Huisman	(Netherlands) V8 Racing International	6	2	Ret	2	5	Ret					84
8	(Netherlands) Luc Braams (Netherlands) Duncan Huisman	(United Kingdom) Brookspeed							15	11	**10**	6	84
9	(Germany) Lennart Marioneck (Germany) Tim Stupple	(Germany) RYS Team Holinger	23	5	8	3		4	7	6	Ret	DNS	77.5
10	(Switzerland) Mauro Calamia (Italy) Giuseppe Fascicolo	(Switzerland) Swiss Team	22	14	12	4	Ret	5	5	2	14	7	69
11	(Italy) Giorgio Sernagiotto	(Italy) Villorba Corse	1	8			4						51
12	(Italy) Patrick Zamparini	(Italy) Villorba Corse							**20**	**1**	5	4	49
13	(Netherlands) Marcel Nooren	(Netherlands) V8 Racing International	4	3	4	Ret	Ret	WD					39
14	(Germany) Hendrik Still	(Bulgaria) Sofia Car Motorsport	8	**Ret**	14	7	Ret						28
14	(Germany) Hendrik Still	(Germany) PROsport Performance						7					28
15	(Netherlands) Jelle Beelen	(Netherlands) V8 Racing International	4	3			Ret	WD					27
16	(France) Romain Monti	(Italy) Maserati Spa	Ret	1									25
17	(Australia) Caitlin Wood	(Germany) RYS Team KISKA	13	13	16	9		9	11	20	21	21	20
18	(Austria) Laura Kraihamer (Belgium) Jamie Vandenbalck	(Germany) RYS Team KTM	11	19	10	8		EX	10	17	Ret	12	18
19	(Netherlands) Tim Coronel (Netherlands) Pieter-Christiaan van Oranje	(Netherlands) Racing Team Holland by Intercar	DNS	16							12	5	16
19	(Netherlands) Tim Coronel (Netherlands) Pieter-Christiaan van Oranje	(Bulgaria) Sofia Car Motorsport						Ret					16
19	(Germany) Andreas Gülden	(Bulgaria) Sofia Car Motorsport	8	**Ret**	14	7							16
20	(United Kingdom) Rebecca Jackson (Denmark) Thomas Krebs	(Germany) RYS Team WP	10	15	13	6		Ret	23	21	23	20	15
21	(Germany) Maximilian Voelker	(Germany) RYS Team KISKA	13	13				9					13
22	(Netherlands) Donald Molenaar	(Netherlands) V8 Racing International			4	Ret							12
22	(Germany) Carsten Struwe	(Germany) PROsport Performance						7					12
23	(France) André Grammatico	(France) BMW Espace Bienvenue			6	15							11
24	(Finland) Marko Helistekangas	(Germany) RYS Team Pankl	19	24				11					10
24	(Finland) Marko Helistekangas	(Germany) RYS Team KISKA			16	9			22	22	19	19	10
25	(Finland) Juuso-Matti Pajuranta (Portugal) Jorge Rodrigues	(Italy) RODRIGUES						8					9
26	(Germany) Immanuel Vinke (New Zealand) Chris Vlok	(Germany) RYS Team InterNetX	9	21	11	Ret		17	16	23	15	24	9
27	(France) Michael Blanchemain	(Italy) Villorba Corse			9	10		Ret					8
28	(Germany) Doreen Seidel	(Germany) RYS Team Pankl	19	24				11	22	22	19	19	6
29	(Switzerland) Cédric Freiburghaus	(Germany) RYS Team True Racing	15	18	15	Ret		12			16	22	6
29	(Switzerland) Cédric Freiburghaus	(Germany) RYS Team KISKA							11	20			6
30	(Norway) Anna Rathe	(Germany) RYS Team True Racing	15	18	15	Ret		12	WD	WD	16	22	3
	(Czech Republic) Daniel Rymes	(Germany) PROsport Performance	14	17									0
	(Germany) Mike Hansch	(Germany) PROsport Performance	20	23									0
	(Belgium) Naomi Schiff	(Germany) RYS Team KISKA									21	21	0
	(United Kingdom) Michael Epps	(Bulgaria) Sofia Car Motorsport					Ret						
Guest drivers ineligible for Pro Class points
	(United Kingdom) Will Moore (Sweden) Dennis Strandberg	(United Kingdom) Academy Motorsport									4	13	
	(United Kingdom) Matthew George (Sweden) James Holder	(United Kingdom) Generation AMR Super Racing									22	23	
Am Class
1	(France) Jérôme Demay	(Belgium) Street Art Racing	21	25	19	13	12	1	9	4	6	18	163.5
2	(Germany) Jan Kasperlik	(Germany) Allied Racing	7	7	5	**5**	11	16	17	10	7	Ret	161
3	(Italy) Giuseppe Ghezzi (Italy) Alessandro Giovanelli	(Italy) Autorlando Sport	**16**	**4**			9	**10**	Ret	14	20	14	133.5
4	(Belgium) Damien Dupont	(Belgium) Street Art Racing						1	9	4	6	18	115.5
5	(Austria) Dietmar Lackinger	(Germany) Allied Racing	7	7	5	**5**	11	16					113
6	(United Kingdom) Riki Christodoulou	(Germany) PROsport Performance					**7**	WD	6	**19**	17	15	101.5
7	(United Kingdom) Steven Liquorish (United Kingdom) Graeme Mundy	(United Kingdom) Brookspeed			17	12	8	13	18	15	Ret	Ret	99.5
8	(Germany) Carsten Struwe	(Germany) PROsport Performance							6	**19**	17	15	64
9	(Italy) Alessandro Fogliani (Italy) Patrick Zamparini	(Italy) Villorba Corse	5	10	18	14							62
10	(Poland) Antoni Chodzen (Poland) Piotr Chodzen	(Italy) Villorba Corse	12	22			10	Ret	Ret	DNS	Ret	17	53
11	(Netherlands) Liesette Braams	(Netherlands) Las Moras Racing Team					Ret						50
11	(Netherlands) Liesette Braams	(Germany) Las Moras by Allied Racing							19	13	18	16	50
12	(Belgium) Albert Bloem	(Belgium) Street Art Racing	21	25	19	13	12						48
13	(Germany) Mike Hansch	(Germany) PROsport Performance					**7**	WD					37.5
14	(France) Éric Cayrolle (France) Didier Moureu	(France) CMR			**7**	11							36
15	(United Kingdom) David Fairbrother (United Kingdom) Wayne Marrs	(United Kingdom) Pall-Ex Slidesport Motorsport						15	24	16			29
16	(Italy) Alessandro Iazzetti	(Italy) Maserati Spa	18	12									20
17	(France) Pierre-Etienne Bordet (France) Alexandre Viron	(Belgium) Delahaye Racing Team						14					18
18	(San Marino) Paolo Meloni (Italy) Massimilliano Tresoldi	(Germany) Allied Racing						Ret					15
18	(San Marino) Paolo Meloni (Italy) Massimilliano Tresoldi	(Switzerland) Swiss Team							**12**	Ret			15
19	(France) André Grammatico	(France) BMW Espace Bienvenue	Ret	11									12
	(Netherlands) Frans Verschuur	(Netherlands) Las Moras Racing Team					Ret						
	(Poland) Łukasz Kręski (Poland) Maciej Marcinkiewicz	(Poland) eSKY INVENTO Racing Team						Ret					
Guest drivers ineligible for Am Class points
	(Romania) Nicolae Sergiu George	(Bulgaria) Sofia Car Motorsport							13	5	**9**	**9**	
	(United Kingdom) Christopher Chadwick	(Bulgaria) Sofia Car Motorsport							13	5			
	(Netherlands) Tristan Boorsma (Netherlands) Yorick Boorsma	(Netherlands) NMT Racing Team									11	8	
	(Romania) Eduard Anton	(Bulgaria) Sofia Car Motorsport									**9**	**9**	
	(Sweden) Kari Mäkinen (Sweden) Oskar Krüger	(Sweden) Bald Eagle Racing							14	9			
	(Netherlands) Gaby Uljee	(Germany) Las Moras by Allied Racing							19	13	18	16	
	(Sweden) Peter Larsen (Sweden) Johan Rosén	(Sweden) Primus Racing							21	18			
Invitational Class
	(Germany) Carsten Struwe	(Germany) PROsport Performance	17	20									
	(Poland) Łukasz Habaj (Poland) Łukasz Kręski	(Italy) Villorba Corse					DNS						
Pos.	Driver	Team	MNZ (Italy)		PAU (France)		SIL (United Kingdom)	SPA (Belgium)	HUN (Hungary)		ZAN (Netherlands)		Points

Key
Colour	Result
Gold	Race winner
Silver	2nd place
Bronze	3rd place
Green	Points finish
Blue	Non-points finish
Blue	Non-classified finish (NC)
Purple	Did not finish (Ret)
Black	Disqualified (DSQ)
Black	Excluded (EX)
White	Did not start (DNS)
White	Race cancelled (C)
White	Withdrew (WD)
Blank	Did not participate

**Bold** – Pole
Italics – Fastest Lap

=== Teams' championship ===
Pos.	Team	Manufacturer	MNZ (Italy)		PAU (France)		SIL (United Kingdom)	SPA (Belgium)	HUN (Hungary)	ZAN (Netherlands)	Points
1	(Germany) PROsport Performance	Porsche	14	17	**1**	**1**	1	3			111
2	(Netherlands) V8 Racing International	Chevrolet	4	2	4	2	5				84
2	(Netherlands) V8 Racing International	Aston Martin						Ret			84
3	(Italy) Villorba Corse	Maserati	1	8	9	10	4	Ret			58.5
4	(Netherlands) Racing Team Holland by Ekris Motorsport	BMW	**2**	6	Ret	DNS	**3**	**Ret**			55
5	(Germany) RYS Team Holinger	KTM	23	5	8	3		4			51
5	(Germany) Allied Racing	BMW	7	7	5	5	10	16			51
6	(Belgium) Street Art Racing	Aston Martin	21	25	19	13	11	1			45.5
7	(Germany) RYS Team Hohenberg	KTM	EX	Ret	3	Ret		2			45
8	(Italy) Autorlando Sport	Porsche	16	4			9	10			35
9	(Switzerland) Swiss Team	Maserati	22	14	12	4	Ret	5			28
10	(Italy) Maserati Spa	Maserati	18	1							25
11	(Bulgaria) Sofia Car Motorsport	SIN	8	**Ret**	14	7	Ret	Ret			16
12	(United Kingdom) Brookspeed	Porsche			17	12	8	13			15
12	(Germany) RYS Team KISKA	KTM	13	13	16	9		9			15
13	(France) BMW Espace Bienvenue	BMW	Ret	11	6	15					14
13	(Germany) RYS Team WP	KTM	10	15	13	6		Ret			14
14	(Italy) V-Action Racing Team	Maserati						8			10
15	(Germany) RYS Team KTM	KTM	11	19	10	8		EX			10
16	(Germany) RYS Team InterNetX	KTM	9	21	11	Ret		17			9
17	(France) CMR	Ginetta			7	11					8
18	(Germany) RYS Team Pankl	KTM	19	24				11			6
19	(Germany) RYS Team True Racing	KTM	15	18	15	Ret		12			3
20	(Belgium) Delahaye Racing Team	Porsche						14			0
20	(United Kingdom) Pall-Ex Slidesport Motorsport	Porsche						15			0
20	(Netherlands) Racing Team Holland by Intercar	BMW	DNS	16							0
20	(Netherlands) Las Moras Racing Team	BMW					Ret				0
20	(Poland) eSKY INVENTO Racing Team	Maserati						Ret			0
Pos.	Team	Manufacturer	MNZ (Italy)		PAU (France)		SIL (United Kingdom)	SPA (Belgium)	HUN (Hungary)	ZAN (Netherlands)	Points
