= 2011 GT4 European Cup =

Seasons
- ← 2010 2013(Trophy) →

The 2011 GT4 European Cup season was the fifth season of the GT4 European Cup. It began on 23 April at Zandvoort, and was scheduled to finish at the same venue on 16 October after eighteen races held at six meetings.

== Entry list ==
2011 Entry List
Team	No.	Driver(s)	Class	Car	Rounds
(Netherlands) Marcos International	3	(Netherlands) Cor Euser	GT4	Lotus Evora GT4	All
(Netherlands) Marcos International	3	(Netherlands) Dick Freebird	GT4	Lotus Evora GT4	All
(Netherlands) Marcos International	4	(United States) Hal Prewitt	GT4	Lotus Evora GT4	2
(United Kingdom) Generation AMR	6	(United Kingdom) James Appleby	GT4	Aston Martin GT4	All
(United Kingdom) Generation AMR	6	(United Kingdom) Ant Scragg	GT4	Aston Martin GT4	All
(Netherlands) Rhesus Racing	7	(Netherlands) Dennis Retera	GT4	Aston Martin GT4	All
(Netherlands) Rhesus Racing	7	(Netherlands) Jan Joris Verheul	GT4	Aston Martin GT4	All
(Belgium) Speedlover	10	(Belgium) Philip Cracco	GT4	Aston Martin GT4	3
(Belgium) DVB Racing	14	(Belgium) Christophe Legrand	GT4	BMW M3 GT4	1
(Belgium) DVB Racing	14	(Belgium) Bart Van Haren	GT4	BMW M3 GT4	1
(Czech Republic) GTR CZ	15	(Czech Republic) Jiri Gottwald	GT4	Ginetta G50	1–3, 5–6
(Czech Republic) GTR CZ	15	(Czech Republic) Ales Jiricek	GT4	Ginetta G50	All
(Czech Republic) Sun Racing	16	(Czech Republic) Eduard Leganov	GT4	Ginetta G50	All
(United Kingdom) Motorground	18	(United Kingdom) Henry Taylor	GT4	Ginetta G50	1–4
(United Kingdom) Motorground	18	(United Kingdom) Jake Rattenbury	GT4	Ginetta G50	1–2
(Netherlands) Verschuur	19	(Netherlands) Luc Braams	GT4	Chevrolet Camaro GT4	All
(Netherlands) Verschuur	19	(Netherlands) Wim van Genderen	GT4	Chevrolet Camaro GT4	All
(Netherlands) Verschuur	21	(Netherlands) Donald Molenaar	GT4	Chevrolet Camaro GT4	2
(Netherlands) Verschuur	21	(Netherlands) Ronald Morien	GT4	Chevrolet Camaro GT4	2
(Italy) Scuderia Giudici	22	(Italy) Stefano D'Aste	GT4	Lotus Evora GT4	All
(Italy) Scuderia Giudici	23	(Italy) Andrea Perlini	GT4	Lotus Evora GT4	1–5
(Italy) Scuderia Giudici	23	(Italy) Marco Fumagalli	GT4	Lotus Evora GT4	1–5
(Italy) Scuderia Giudici	211	(Italy) Gianni Giudici	SS	Lotus 2-Eleven	All
(United Kingdom) RJN Motorsport	24	(United Kingdom) Alex Buncombe	GT4	Nissan 370Z GT4	2
(United Kingdom) RJN Motorsport	24	(France) Jordan Tresson	GT4	Nissan 370Z GT4	2
(United Kingdom) RJN Motorsport	24	(United Kingdom) Jann Mardenborough	GT4	Nissan 370Z GT4	6
(United Kingdom) RJN Motorsport	24	(United States) Bryan Heitkotter	GT4	Nissan 370Z GT4	6
(Belgium) Konvex Motorsport	26	(France) Daniel Waszinski	GT4	Maserati GranTurismo MC	1, 3–4
(Belgium) Konvex Motorsport	26	(Belgium) Renaud Kuppens	GT4	Maserati GranTurismo MC	1, 3–4
(United Kingdom) Team Ningbo	28	(United Kingdom) Chris Stockton	GT4	Ginetta G50	All
(United Kingdom) Team Ningbo	28	(United Kingdom) Steve Brady	GT4	Ginetta G50	1–4
(United Kingdom) Team Ningbo	28	(Netherlands) Kevin Veltman	GT4	Ginetta G50	5–6
(Austria) Renauer Motorsport	30	(Austria) Michael Drabing	GT4	Ginetta G50	1–5
(Austria) Renauer Motorsport	31	(Austria) Florian Renauer	GT4	Ginetta G50	1–5
(United Kingdom) Scuderia Vittoria	35	(United Kingdom) Dan Denis	GT4	Ginetta G50	2
(United Kingdom) Lotus UK	36	(United Kingdom) Ollie Jackson	GT4	Lotus Evora GT4	2, 4–5
(United Kingdom) Lotus UK	36	(United Kingdom) Stuart Hall	GT4	Lotus Evora GT4	2
(United Kingdom) Lotus UK	36	(United Kingdom) Simon Phillips	GT4	Lotus Evora GT4	4
(United Kingdom) Lotus UK	36	(United Kingdom) Allistair Mackinnon	GT4	Lotus Evora GT4	5
(Belgium) John's Racing Team	37	(Belgium) André Bloem	GT4	Lotus Evora GT4	3
(Belgium) John's Racing Team	37	(France) Jérôme Demay	GT4	Lotus Evora GT4	3
(Netherlands) Ekris	50	(Netherlands) Duncan Huisman	GT4	BMW M3 GT4	All
(Netherlands) Ekris	50	(Netherlands) Ricardo van der Ende	GT4	BMW M3 GT4	All
(Netherlands) Ekris	51	(Netherlands) Bernhard Van Oranje	GT4	BMW M3 GT4	1, 5–6
(Netherlands) Ekris	51	(Netherlands) PC Van Oranje	GT4	BMW M3 GT4	1, 6
(Netherlands) Ekris	51	(Netherlands) Tom Coronel	GT4	BMW M3 GT4	5
(Netherlands) SSR/Datahouse	63	(Netherlands) Jeroen Bleekemolen	GT4	Corvette C6 GT4	1, 4, 6
(Netherlands) SSR/Datahouse	63	(Netherlands) Peter Van Der Kolk	GT4	Corvette C6 GT4	All
(Netherlands) SSR/Datahouse	63	(Netherlands) Jeroen van den Heuvel	GT4	Corvette C6 GT4	2–3, 5

Icon	Class
GT4	GT4 Class
SS	SuperSport Class

== Race calendar and results ==
Round		Circuit	Date	Pole position	Fastest lap	Race winner
1	R1	(Netherlands) Circuit Park Zandvoort	23 April	No. 7 Rhesus Racing	No. 28 Team Ningbo	No. 22 Scuderia Giudici
1	R1	(Netherlands) Circuit Park Zandvoort	23 April	(Netherlands) Dennis Retera (Netherlands) Jan Joris Verheul	(United Kingdom) Steve Brady (United Kingdom) Chris Stockton	(Italy) Stefano d'Aste
1	R2	(Netherlands) Circuit Park Zandvoort	25 April	No. 63 SSR/Datahouse	No. 63 SSR/Datahouse	No. 63 SSR/Datahouse
1	R2	(Netherlands) Circuit Park Zandvoort	25 April	(Netherlands) Jeroen Bleekemolen (Netherlands) Peter Van Der Kolk	(Netherlands) Jeroen Bleekemolen (Netherlands) Peter Van Der Kolk	(Netherlands) Jeroen Bleekemolen (Netherlands) Peter Van Der Kolk
1	R3	(Netherlands) Circuit Park Zandvoort	25 April	No. 63 SSR/Datahouse	No. 22 Scuderia Giudici	No. 22 Scuderia Giudici
1	R3	(Netherlands) Circuit Park Zandvoort	25 April	(Netherlands) Jeroen Bleekemolen (Netherlands) Peter Van Der Kolk	(Italy) Stefano d'Aste	(Italy) Stefano d'Aste
2	R1	(United Kingdom) Silverstone Circuit	4 June	No. 50 Ekris Motorsport	No. 22 Scuderia Giudici	No. 24 RJN Motorsport
2	R1	(United Kingdom) Silverstone Circuit	4 June	(Netherlands) Duncan Huisman (Netherlands) Ricardo van der Ende	(Italy) Stefano d'Aste	(United Kingdom) Alex Buncombe (France) Jordan Tresson
2	R2	(United Kingdom) Silverstone Circuit	4 June	No. 50 Ekris Motorsport	No. 36 Lotus UK	No. 50 Ekris Motorsport
2	R2	(United Kingdom) Silverstone Circuit	4 June	(Netherlands) Duncan Huisman (Netherlands) Ricardo van der Ende	(United Kingdom) Stuart Hall (United Kingdom) Ollie Jackson	(Netherlands) Duncan Huisman (Netherlands) Ricardo van der Ende
2	R3	(United Kingdom) Silverstone Circuit	5 June	No. 50 Ekris Motorsport	No. 50 Ekris Motorsport	No. 50 Ekris Motorsport
2	R3	(United Kingdom) Silverstone Circuit	5 June	(Netherlands) Duncan Huisman (Netherlands) Ricardo van der Ende	(Netherlands) Duncan Huisman (Netherlands) Ricardo van der Ende	(Netherlands) Duncan Huisman (Netherlands) Ricardo van der Ende
3	R1	(Belgium) Circuit de Spa-Francorchamps	9 July	No. 3 Marcos International	No. 3 Marcos International	No. 6 Generation AMR
3	R1	(Belgium) Circuit de Spa-Francorchamps	9 July	(Netherlands) Cor Euser (Netherlands) Dick Freebird	(Netherlands) Cor Euser (Netherlands) Dick Freebird	(United Kingdom) James Appleby (United Kingdom) Ant Scragg
3	R2	(Belgium) Circuit de Spa-Francorchamps	9 July	No. 22 Scuderia Giudici	No. 50 Ekris Motorsport	No. 50 Ekris Motorsport
3	R2	(Belgium) Circuit de Spa-Francorchamps	9 July	(Italy) Stefano d'Aste	(Netherlands) Duncan Huisman (Netherlands) Ricardo van der Ende	(Netherlands) Duncan Huisman (Netherlands) Ricardo van der Ende
4	R1	(Belgium) Circuit Zolder	16 July	No. 50 Ekris Motorsport	No. 22 Scuderia Giudici	No. 22 Scuderia Giudici
4	R1	(Belgium) Circuit Zolder	16 July	(Netherlands) Duncan Huisman (Netherlands) Ricardo van der Ende	(Italy) Stefano d'Aste	(Italy) Stefano d'Aste
4	R2	(Belgium) Circuit Zolder	16 July	No. 63 SSR/Datahouse	No. 22 Scuderia Giudici	No. 63 SSR/Datahouse
4	R2	(Belgium) Circuit Zolder	16 July	(Netherlands) Jeroen Bleekemolen (Netherlands) Peter Van Der Kolk	(Italy) Stefano d'Aste	(Netherlands) Jeroen Bleekemolen (Netherlands) Peter Van Der Kolk
4	R3	(Belgium) Circuit Zolder	17 July	No. 63 SSR/Datahouse	No. 63 SSR/Datahouse	No. 63 SSR/Datahouse
4	R3	(Belgium) Circuit Zolder	17 July	(Netherlands) Jeroen Bleekemolen (Netherlands) Peter Van Der Kolk	(Netherlands) Jeroen Bleekemolen (Netherlands) Peter Van Der Kolk	(Netherlands) Jeroen Bleekemolen (Netherlands) Peter Van Der Kolk
5	R1	(Netherlands) TT Circuit Assen	17 September	No. 22 Scuderia Giudici	No. 22 Scuderia Giudici	No. 22 Scuderia Giudici
5	R1	(Netherlands) TT Circuit Assen	17 September	(Italy) Stefano d'Aste	(Italy) Stefano d'Aste	(Italy) Stefano d'Aste
5	R2	(Netherlands) TT Circuit Assen	17 September	No. 22 Scuderia Giudici	No. 50 Ekris Motorsport	No. 22 Scuderia Giudici
5	R2	(Netherlands) TT Circuit Assen	17 September	(Italy) Stefano d'Aste	(Netherlands) Duncan Huisman (Netherlands) Ricardo van der Ende	(Italy) Stefano d'Aste
5	R3	(Netherlands) TT Circuit Assen	18 September	No. 22 Scuderia Giudici	No. 51 Ekris Motorsport	No. 22 Scuderia Giudici
5	R3	(Netherlands) TT Circuit Assen	18 September	(Italy) Stefano d'Aste	(Netherlands) Bernhard Van Oranje (Netherlands) Tom Coronel	(Italy) Stefano d'Aste
6	R1	(Netherlands) Circuit Park Zandvoort	15 October	No. 63 SSR/Datahouse	No. 50 Ekris Motorsport	No. 63 SSR/Datahouse
6	R1	(Netherlands) Circuit Park Zandvoort	15 October	(Netherlands) Jeroen Bleekemolen (Netherlands) Peter Van Der Kolk	(Netherlands) Duncan Huisman (Netherlands) Ricardo van der Ende	(Netherlands) Jeroen Bleekemolen (Netherlands) Peter Van Der Kolk
6	R2	(Netherlands) Circuit Park Zandvoort	16 October	No. 50 Ekris Motorsport	No. 50 Ekris Motorsport	No. 50 Ekris Motorsport
6	R2	(Netherlands) Circuit Park Zandvoort	16 October	(Netherlands) Duncan Huisman (Netherlands) Ricardo van der Ende	(Netherlands) Duncan Huisman (Netherlands) Ricardo van der Ende	(Netherlands) Duncan Huisman (Netherlands) Ricardo van der Ende
6	R3	(Netherlands) Circuit Park Zandvoort	16 October	No. 63 SSR/Datahouse	No. 3 Marcos International	No. 50 Ekris Motorsport
6	R3	(Netherlands) Circuit Park Zandvoort	16 October	(Netherlands) Jeroen Bleekemolen (Netherlands) Peter Van Der Kolk	(Netherlands) Cor Euser (Netherlands) Dick Freebird	(Netherlands) Duncan Huisman (Netherlands) Ricardo van der Ende
