= 2015 GT4 European Series =

Seasons
- ← 2014 2016 →

The 2015 Competition102 GT4 European Series season was the eighth season of the GT4 European Series, a sports car championship created and organised by the Stéphane Ratel Organisation (SRO). The season began on 5 April at Circuit Paul Armagnac, and finished on 4 October at Misano World Circuit after six race weekends.

V8 Racing duo Marcel Nooren and Jelle Beelen won the GT4 Pro championship by 24 points ahead of their nearest competitor, Duncan Huisman. Nooren and Beelen won races at Nogaro and the Red Bull Ring, as well as taking a total of ten podium finishes from the twelve races. Huisman was a three-time race winner, sharing one victory with Luc Braams and two with Sandor van Es. Third place in the Pro championship standings went to Peter Ebner and Sascha Halek, who also won three races during the season. The other Pro class wins were shared between Carsten Struwe and Peter Terting (sweeping the Nürburgring round), while the pairings of Bernhard van Oranje and Ricardo van der Ende (Racing Team Holland by Ekris Motorsport), and Marcus Clutton and Jordan Witt (Chevron Cars) each took one victory. The GT4 Amateur class title was taken by ZaWotec driver Daniel Uckermann by 19 points ahead of Pavel Lefterov for ASC Bulavto Racing. Uckermann and Lefterov each took four victories, with Liesette Braams, André Grammatico, Håkan Ricknäs and Patrick Zamparini and Barrie Baxter each taking one victory during 2015.

== Calendar ==
On 5 December 2014, a six-round calendar was announced for the 2015 season, with races in support of the Blancpain Sprint Series, the ADAC GT Masters and the Spa 24 Hours. On 27 February 2015, it was announced that the round, scheduled to support Spa 24 Hours, would be moved to June, and in support of the ADAC GT Masters.

Rnd	Circuit	Date	Event
1	(France) Circuit Paul Armagnac, Nogaro	4–6 April	Blancpain Sprint Series
2	(Netherlands) Circuit Park Zandvoort, Noord-Holland	23–24 May	Pinksterraces
3	(Austria) Red Bull Ring, Spielberg	6–7 June	ADAC GT Masters
4	(Belgium) Circuit de Spa-Francorchamps, Francorchamps	20–21 June	ADAC GT Masters
5	(Germany) Nürburgring, Nürburg	15–16 August	ADAC GT Masters
6	(Italy) Misano World Circuit Marco Simoncelli, Misano	3–4 October	Blancpain Sprint Series

== Entry list ==
2015 Entry List
Team	Car	No.	Drivers	Class	Rounds
(Netherlands) Racing Team Holland by Ekris Motorsport	Ford Mustang FR500C	1	(Netherlands) Bernhard van Oranje (Netherlands) Ricardo van der Ende	P	1
(Netherlands) Racing Team Holland by Ekris Motorsport	Ekris M4 GT4	1	(Netherlands) Bernhard van Oranje (Netherlands) Ricardo van der Ende	P	6
(Netherlands) Racing Team Holland by Ekris Motorsport	BMW M3 GT4	1	(Netherlands) Bernhard van Oranje (Netherlands) Ricardo van der Ende	P	2–5
(Netherlands) Racing Team Holland by Ekris Motorsport	BMW M3 GT4	8	(Netherlands) Rob Severs	P	All
(Netherlands) Racing Team Holland by Ekris Motorsport	BMW M3 GT4	8	(Netherlands) Simon Knap	P	All
(Netherlands) Las Moras Racing Team	BMW M3 GT4	4	(Netherlands) Liesette Braams	A	1–2, 6
(Netherlands) Las Moras Racing Team	BMW M3 GT4	4	(Netherlands) Frans Verschuur	A	6
(Netherlands) Las Moras Racing Team	BMW M3 GT4	4	(Germany) Jörg Viebahn	P	4–5
(Bulgaria) ASC Bulavto Racing	Lotus Evora GT4	6	(Bulgaria) Pavel Lefterov	A	All
(France) BMW Espace Bienvenue	BMW M3 GT4	9	(France) André Grammatico	A	1
(Germany) Mathol Racing	Aston Martin Vantage GT4	10	(Germany) Jörg Viebahn	P	1–3
(Bulgaria) Sofia Car Motorsport	SIN R1 GT4	11	(Bulgaria) Ivo Tzonev	A	1
(Bulgaria) Sofia Car Motorsport	SIN R1 GT4	11	(Bulgaria) Grigor Grigorov	A	1
(Bulgaria) Sofia Car Motorsport	SIN R1 GT4	11	(Argentina) José Luis Talermann	A	2–4
(Bulgaria) Sofia Car Motorsport	SIN R1 GT4	11	(Argentina) José Manuel Balbiani	A	2
(Bulgaria) Sofia Car Motorsport	SIN R1 GT4	11	(Argentina) Marcos Siebert	A	3
(Bulgaria) Sofia Car Motorsport	SIN R1 GT4	11	(Netherlands) Pieter Christiaan van Oranje	A	5 (Note: Sofia Car Motorsport withdrew from the Nürburgring round after their request to field Hendrik Still in the No. 71 as a solo driver was rejected by the other teams.)
(Bulgaria) Sofia Car Motorsport	SIN R1 GT4	11	(Germany) Stephan Kuhs	A	5
(Bulgaria) Sofia Car Motorsport	SIN R1 GT4	11	(Belgium) Olivier Muytjens	P	6
(Bulgaria) Sofia Car Motorsport	SIN R1 GT4	11	(Germany) Peter Terting	P	6
(Bulgaria) Sofia Car Motorsport	SIN R1 GT4	71	(Germany) Hendrik Still	P	1–3, 5–6
(Bulgaria) Sofia Car Motorsport	SIN R1 GT4	71	(Netherlands) Pieter Christiaan van Oranje	P	2
(Bulgaria) Sofia Car Motorsport	SIN R1 GT4	71	(Bulgaria) Rosen Daskalov	P	3
(Bulgaria) Sofia Car Motorsport	SIN R1 GT4	71	(Germany) Tim Scheerbarth	P	5
(Bulgaria) Sofia Car Motorsport	SIN R1 GT4	71	(Germany) Andreas Gülden	P	6
(Netherlands) NMT Racing	BMW M3 GT4	12	(Netherlands) Tristan Boorsma	A	2, 4
(Netherlands) NMT Racing	BMW M3 GT4	12	(Netherlands) Yorick Boorsma	A	2, 4
(Austria) ZaWotec	KTM X-Bow GTR	15	(Austria) Sascha Halek	P	2–6
(Austria) ZaWotec	KTM X-Bow GTR	15	(Austria) Peter Ebner	P	2–6
(Austria) ZaWotec	KTM X-Bow GTR	16	(Austria) Heinz Halek	A	6
(Austria) ZaWotec	KTM X-Bow GTR	16	(Austria) Daniel Uckermann	A	2–5
(Austria) ZaWotec	Lotus Evora GT4	16	(Austria) Daniel Uckermann	A	1
(Germany) PROsport Performance	Porsche 981 Cayman SP	18	(Denmark) Thomas Krebs	A (Note: Thomas Krebs and Arno Klassen were counted as Pro drivers prior to the second race of the Nogaro round.)	1–4
(Germany) PROsport Performance	Porsche 981 Cayman SP	18	(Germany) Arno Klasen	A	1–2
(Germany) PROsport Performance	Porsche 981 Cayman SP	18	(Germany) Carsten Struwe	A	3–4
(Germany) PROsport Performance	Porsche 981 Cayman SP	18	(Germany) Carsten Struwe	P	5
(Germany) PROsport Performance	Porsche 981 Cayman SP	18	(Germany) Peter Terting	P	5
(Sweden) Ricknäs Motorsport	Porsche 911 GT4	21	(Denmark) Peter Larsen	A	2
(Sweden) Ricknäs Motorsport	Porsche 911 GT4	21	(Sweden) Håkan Ricknäs	A	2, 5
(Germany) Allied-Racing	BMW M3 GT4	28	(Germany) Jan Kasperlik	A	2–5 (Note: Prior to the first race of the Spa-Francorchamps round, Jan Kasperlik withdrew due to illness. Dietmar Lackinger competed in the races as a solo driver.)
(Germany) Allied-Racing	BMW M3 GT4	28	(Austria) Dietmar Lackinger	A	2–5
(Italy) Maserati	Maserati GranTurismo MC	33	(Italy) Carlo Curti	P	6
(Italy) Maserati	Maserati GranTurismo MC	33	(Italy) Lino Curti	P	6
(Italy) Maserati	Maserati GranTurismo MC	46	(Italy) Patrick Zamparini	A	6
(Italy) Maserati	Maserati GranTurismo MC	46	(Canada) Barrie Baxter	A	6
(United Kingdom) Chevron Cars	Chevron GT4	44	(United Kingdom) Marcus Clutton	P	2–6 (Note: The Chevron GT4 had an issue during qualifying for the Red Bull Ring round and did not take part in the races.)
(United Kingdom) Chevron Cars	Chevron GT4	44	(United Kingdom) Wayne Schofield	P	3–4
(United Kingdom) Chevron Cars	Chevron GT4	44	(United Kingdom) Jordan Witt	P	5–6
(United Kingdom) Optimum Motorsport	Ginetta G50 GT4	46	(Turkey) Salih Yoluç	P	5 (Note: Yoluc withdrew from the Nürburgring round after his Ginetta G50 had an engine issue during free practice.)
(United Kingdom) Tolman Motorsport	Ginetta G55 GT4	56	(United Kingdom) David Pattison	A	4
(United Kingdom) Tolman Motorsport	Ginetta G55 GT4	56	(United Kingdom) Luke Davenport	A	4
(Sweden) Bald Eagle Racing	BMW M3 GT4	66	(Sweden) Thomas Martinsson	A	2–3, 5
(Sweden) Bald Eagle Racing	BMW M3 GT4	66	(Sweden) Oskar Krüger	A	2–3, 5
(Netherlands) V8 Racing	Chevrolet Camaro GT4	69	(Netherlands) Marcel Nooren	P	All
(Netherlands) V8 Racing	Chevrolet Camaro GT4	69	(Netherlands) Jelle Beelen	P	All
(Netherlands) V8 Racing	Chevrolet Camaro GT4	96	(Netherlands) Duncan Huisman	P	All
(Netherlands) V8 Racing	Chevrolet Camaro GT4	96	(Netherlands) Luc Braams	P	1–3, 5–6
(Netherlands) V8 Racing	Chevrolet Camaro GT4	96	(Netherlands) Sandor van Es	P	4
(Sweden) Förenade Racing	BMW M3 GT4	90	(Sweden) Milton Lundström	A	5
(Sweden) Förenade Racing	BMW M3 GT4	90	(Sweden) Joakim Söderström	A	5

Icon	Class
P	Pro
A	Amateur

== Race calendar and results ==
Round		Circuit	Date	Pole position	Pro winners	Am winners	Overall winners
1	R1	Nogaro	5 April	(Bulgaria) No. 71 Sofia Car Motorsport	(Netherlands) No. 96 V8 Racing	(Netherlands) No. 4 Las Moras Racing Team	(Netherlands) No. 96 V8 Racing
1	R1	Nogaro	5 April	(Germany) Hendrik Still	(Netherlands) Luc Braams (Netherlands) Duncan Huisman	(Netherlands) Liesette Braams	(Netherlands) Luc Braams (Netherlands) Duncan Huisman
1	R2	Nogaro	6 April	(Netherlands) No. 96 V8 Racing	(Netherlands) No. 69 V8 Racing	(France) No. 9 BMW Espace Bienvenue	(Netherlands) No. 69 V8 Racing
1	R2	Nogaro	6 April	(Netherlands) Luc Braams (Netherlands) Duncan Huisman	(Netherlands) Marcel Nooren (Netherlands) Jelle Beelen	(France) André Grammatico	(Netherlands) Marcel Nooren (Netherlands) Jelle Beelen
2	R1	Zandvoort	23 May	(Austria) No. 15 ZaWotec	(Netherlands) No. 1 Racing Team Holland by Ekris Motorsport	(Austria) No. 16 ZaWotec	(Austria) No. 16 ZaWotec
2	R1	Zandvoort	23 May	(Austria) Sascha Halek (Austria) Peter Ebner	(Netherlands) Bernhard van Oranje (Netherlands) Ricardo van der Ende	(Austria) Daniel Uckermann	(Austria) Daniel Uckermann
2	R2	Zandvoort	24 May	(Austria) No. 15 ZaWotec	(Austria) No. 15 ZaWotec	(Austria) No. 16 ZaWotec	(Austria) No. 15 ZaWotec
2	R2	Zandvoort	24 May	(Austria) Sascha Halek (Austria) Peter Ebner	(Austria) Sascha Halek (Austria) Peter Ebner	(Austria) Daniel Uckermann	(Austria) Sascha Halek (Austria) Peter Ebner
3	R1	Spielberg	7 June	(Austria) No. 15 ZaWotec	(Austria) No. 15 ZaWotec	(Austria) No. 16 ZaWotec	(Austria) No. 15 ZaWotec
3	R1	Spielberg	7 June	(Austria) Sascha Halek (Austria) Peter Ebner	(Austria) Sascha Halek (Austria) Peter Ebner	(Austria) Daniel Uckermann	(Austria) Sascha Halek (Austria) Peter Ebner
3	R2	Spielberg	7 June	(Bulgaria) No. 71 Sofia Car Motorsport	(Netherlands) No. 69 V8 Racing	(Austria) No. 16 ZaWotec	(Netherlands) No. 69 V8 Racing
3	R2	Spielberg	7 June	(Germany) Hendrik Still (Bulgaria) Rosen Daskalov	(Netherlands) Marcel Nooren (Netherlands) Jelle Beelen	(Austria) Daniel Uckermann	(Netherlands) Marcel Nooren (Netherlands) Jelle Beelen
4	R1	Spa-Francorchamps	20 June	(Netherlands) No. 96 V8 Racing	(Netherlands) No. 96 V8 Racing	(Bulgaria) No. 6 ASC Bulavto Racing	(Bulgaria) No. 6 ASC Bulavto Racing
4	R1	Spa-Francorchamps	20 June	(Netherlands) Sandor van Es (Netherlands) Duncan Huisman	(Netherlands) Sandor van Es (Netherlands) Duncan Huisman	(Bulgaria) Pavel Lefterov	(Bulgaria) Pavel Lefterov
4	R2	Spa-Francorchamps	21 June	(Bulgaria) No. 6 ASC Bulavto Racing	(Netherlands) No. 96 V8 Racing	(Bulgaria) No. 6 ASC Bulavto Racing	(Bulgaria) No. 6 ASC Bulavto Racing
4	R2	Spa-Francorchamps	21 June	(Bulgaria) Pavel Lefterov	(Netherlands) Sandor van Es (Netherlands) Duncan Huisman	(Bulgaria) Pavel Lefterov	(Bulgaria) Pavel Lefterov
5	R1	Nürburgring	15 August	(Austria) No. 15 ZaWotec	(Germany) No. 18 PROsport Performance	(Sweden) No. 21 Ricknäs Motorsport	(Germany) No. 18 PROsport Performance
5	R1	Nürburgring	15 August	(Austria) Sascha Halek (Austria) Peter Ebner	(Germany) Carsten Struwe (Germany) Peter Terting	(Sweden) Håkan Ricknäs	(Germany) Carsten Struwe (Germany) Peter Terting
5	R2	Nürburgring	15 August	(Netherlands) No. 1 Racing Team Holland by Ekris Motorsport	(Germany) No. 18 PROsport Performance	(Bulgaria) No. 6 ASC Bulavto Racing	(Bulgaria) No. 6 ASC Bulavto Racing
5	R2	Nürburgring	15 August	(Netherlands) Bernhard van Oranje (Netherlands) Ricardo van der Ende	(Germany) Carsten Struwe (Germany) Peter Terting	(Bulgaria) Pavel Lefterov	(Bulgaria) Pavel Lefterov
6	R1	Misano	3 October	(United Kingdom) No. 44 Chevron Cars	(United Kingdom) No. 44 Chevron Cars	(Italy) No. 46 Maserati	(United Kingdom) No. 44 Chevron Cars
6	R1	Misano	3 October	(United Kingdom) Marcus Clutton (United Kingdom) Jordan Witt	(United Kingdom) Marcus Clutton (United Kingdom) Jordan Witt	(Italy) Patrick Zamparini (Canada) Barrie Baxter	(United Kingdom) Marcus Clutton (United Kingdom) Jordan Witt
6	R2	Misano	4 October	(Bulgaria) No. 6 ASC Bulavto Racing	(Austria) No. 15 ZaWotec	(Bulgaria) No. 6 ASC Bulavto Racing	(Bulgaria) No. 6 ASC Bulavto Racing
6	R2	Misano	4 October	(Bulgaria) Pavel Lefterov	(Austria) Sascha Halek (Austria) Peter Ebner	(Bulgaria) Pavel Lefterov	(Bulgaria) Pavel Lefterov
