= GT4 European Series =

Sports car championship

- Category: Sports car racing
- Region: Europe
- Inaugural season: 2007
- Classes: Silver • Pro-Am • Am
- Manufacturers: Aston Martin • Audi • BMW • Ford • Ginetta • Lotus • McLaren • Mercedes-AMG • Porsche • Toyota
- Tyre suppliers: Pirelli
- Current champions: (United Kingdom) McKenzy Cresswell (United Kingdom) Charlie Hart
- Teams' champion: (United Kingdom) Elite Motorsport with Entire Race Engineering
- Official website: www.gt4europeanseries.com

The GT4 European Series is a sports car championship featuring production-based GT4 vehicles, organised by the SRO Motorsports Group. It is a Pro/Am series and serves as a primary support series for the GT World Challenge Europe.

== History ==
The GT4 European Series, organized by SRO Motorsports Group, is a sports car championship launched in 2007 as an affordable, amateur-oriented alternative to GT3 racing. Since its inception, it has undergone several format changes and rebrandings, and now serves as a prominent support series for the GT World Challenge Europe.

Founded by the Stéphane Ratel Organisation (SRO), the GT4 category debuted with the GT4 European Cup in 2007, aiming to create a competitive platform for true amateur drivers. The series features production-based GT cars with tightly regulated specifications, managed through a Balance of Performance (BoP) system to control costs and ensure parity.

Between 2008 and 2013, the GT4 class was incorporated into various national championships, including the British GT Championship. In 2013, after an expansion effort, the original GT4 European Cup evolved into the GT4 European Trophy, integrating several rounds from existing European series. The following year, the Trophy merged with the Dutch GT4 Championship, resulting in the current GT4 European Series.

Growing interest prompted SRO to split the series into the GT4 European Series Northern Cup and Southern Cup in 2017, the latter aligned with the FFSA GT Championship. This period also saw the introduction of the Silver Cup, Pro-Am, and Am classes to better categorize competitors. By 2018, the Northern Cup was consolidated back into a single GT4 European Series, while the Southern Cup continued as FFSA GT – GT4 France.

Since 2019, the GT4 European Series has seen significant growth in grid sizes and manufacturer involvement, running alongside the GT World Challenge Europe events. It has become a key development path for aspiring GT3 drivers. From the 2025 season, the series is officially named the GT4 European Series powered by RAFA Racing Club. The championship continues to focus on amateur (Bronze) and semi-professional (Silver) participants, with strict entry criteria. Cars, such as the BMW M4 GT4, Ford Mustang GT4, and Audi R8 LMS GT4, are production-based and subject to a rigorous Balance of Performance process to maintain fair competition. Race weekends typically include two one-hour races, often as support events for major fixtures like the CrowdStrike 24 Hours of Spa.

== Format ==
The GT4 European Series features two 60-minute sprint races per event, each requiring a mandatory mid-race driver change and a regulated pit stop. The championship spans six race weekends annually, mainly supporting the GT World Challenge Europe.

Each weekend includes two qualifying sessions—Q1 and Q2—to set the grids for Races 1 and 2. Driver 1 competes in Q1 and starts Race 1, while Driver 2 takes part in Q2 and begins Race 2. Races are typically held on separate days, with a compulsory pit stop in each race for a driver swap within a designated time window. Pit stop durations are strictly controlled (for example, 98 seconds pit-in to pit-out), with penalties for non-compliance to maintain competitive balance. All races use a rolling start format.

Organized by SRO Motorsport Group, the series is a pro/am championship for emerging talent and amateur racers. Competition is divided into three main categories: Silver Cup (both drivers classified as 'Silver' by the FIA, usually young professionals or semi-pros), Pro-Am Cup (pairings of a higher-graded driver—Gold or Silver—with a lower-graded Bronze driver), and Am Cup (exclusively for Bronze-graded amateurs).

To ensure fair racing among the diverse range of eligible GT4 cars—including those from Audi, BMW, Ford, McLaren, Mercedes-AMG, Porsche, and Toyota—the SRO enforces a Balance of Performance (BoP) system that regulates speed and technical parameters across manufacturers.

== Champions ==
=== Drivers ===
Year	GT4	Light	Supersport
2007	(Belgium) Eric De Doncker	Not awarded	Not awarded
2008	(Belgium) Eric De Doncker	(Germany) Christopher Haase	Not awarded
2009	(United Kingdom) Joe Osborne	Not awarded	(Austria) Augustin Eder
2010	(Netherlands) Paul Meijer	Not awarded	(Italy) Gianni Giudici
2011	(Netherlands) Ricardo van der Ende	Not awarded	(Italy) Gianni Giudici
Year	Silver Cup	Pro	Am
2013	Not awarded	(Netherlands) Ricardo van der Ende	(Germany) Jörg Viehbahn
2014	Not awarded	(Netherlands) Bernhard van Oranje (Netherlands) Ricardo van der Ende	(France) André Grammatico
2015	Not awarded	(Netherlands) Jelle Beelen (Netherlands) Marcel Nooren	(Austria) Daniel Uckermann
2016	Not awarded	(Germany) Peter Terting (Germany) Jörg Viebahn	(France) Jérôme Demay
Year	Silver Cup	Pro-Am Cup	Am Cup
2017	(Netherlands) Ricardo van der Ende (Netherlands) Max Koebolt	(Netherlands) Luc Braams (Netherlands) Duncan Huisman	(Italy) Giuseppe Ghezzi
2018	(Netherlands) Milan Dontje (Denmark) Nicolaj Møller Madsen	(Germany) Markus Lungstrass	(Switzerland) Niki Leutwiler
2019	(Netherlands) Simon Knap (United States) Alec Udell	(Norway) Marcus Påverud (Germany) Luca Trefz	(Switzerland) Pascal Bachmann (Luxembourg) Clément Seyler
2020	(France) Valentin Hasse-Clot (France) Théo Nouet	(Denmark) Bastian Buus (Germany) Jan Kasperlik	(France) Nicolas Gomar (France) Gilles Vannelet
2021	(United Kingdom) Charlie Fagg (United Kingdom) Bailey Voisin	(France) Grégory Guilvert (France) Fabien Michal	(France) Michael Blanchemain (France) Christophe Hamon
2022	(Israel) Roee Meyuhas (France) Erwan Bastard	(France) Jean-Luc Beaubelique (France) Jim Pla	(Fédération Internationale de l'Automobile) Mikhail Loboda (Fédération Internationale de l'Automobile) Andrey Solukvtsev
2023	(Germany) Michael Schrey (Italy) Gabriele Piana	(France) Grégory Guilvert (France) Christophe Hamon	(France) Alban Varutti
2024	(United Kingdom) Tom Lebbon (United Kingdom) Josh Rattican	(Germany) Max Kronberg (Germany) Finn Zulauf	(France) Pascal Huteau (France) Laurent Hurgon
2025	(France) Robert Consani (France) Benjamin Lariche	Stanislav Safronov; Aleksandr Vaintrub	(Germany) Daniel Blickle (Germany) Max Kronberg
2026	(United Kingdom) McKenzy Cresswell (United Kingdom) Charlie Hart	(Sweden) Victor Bouveng (Sweden) Joakim Walde	(Germany) Daniel Blickle (Germany) Max Kronberg

=== Teams ===
Year	Overall		
2007	Not awarded		
2008	(Belgium) Motorsport98		
2009	(United Kingdom) RJN Motorsport		
2010	(Netherlands) Rhesus Racing		
2011	(Netherlands) Ekris BMW/Racing Team Holland by Ekris Motorsport		
2013	(Netherlands) Ekris Motorsport		
2014	(Netherlands) Racing Team Holland by Ekris Motorsport		
2015	(Netherlands) V8 Racing		
2016	(Germany) PROsport Performance		
Year	Silver Cup	Pro-Am Cup	Am Cup
2017	(Netherlands) Ekris Motorsport	(Netherlands) Las Moras Racing	(Italy) Autorlando Sport
2018	(Germany) Phoenix Racing	(Germany) Racing One	(France) TFT Racing
2019	(Netherlands) MDM Motorsport	(Germany) Leipert Motorsport	(Belgium) Street Art Racing
Year	Overall		
2018	(Germany) Racing One		
2019	(Germany) Leipert Motorsport		
2020	(France) AGS Events		
Year	Silver Cup	Pro-Am Cup	Am Cup
2021	(United Kingdom) United Autosports	(France) Saintéloc Racing	(France) Team Fullmotorsport
2022	(France) Saintéloc Racing	(France) AKKodis ASP Team	(France) AKKodis ASP Team
2023	(Switzerland) Hofor Racing by Bonk Motorsport	(France) Saintéloc Junior Team	(France) AVR-Avvatar
2024	(United Kingdom) Elite Motorsport with Entire RE	(Germany) W&S Motorsport	(France) Schumacher CLRT
2025	(France) Team Speedcar	(Spain) Mirage Racing	(Germany) W&S Motorsport
2026	(United Kingdom) Elite Motorsport with Entire Race Engineering	(Germany) Schubert Motorsport	(Germany) W&S Motorsport

== Circuits ==
- **Bold** denotes a circuit will be used in the 2027 season.

Circuit	Location	Country	Last length used	Season(s)	Races held
Adria International Raceway	Veneto	Italy	2.702 km (1.679 mi)	2009	1
Algarve International Circuit	Portimão	Portugal	4.653 km (2.891 mi)	2009–2010, 2026	3
Anderstorp Raceway	Anderstorp	Sweden	4.025 km (2.501 mi)	2013	1
Brands Hatch	Kent	United Kingdom	3.916 km (2.433 mi)	2017–2019	3
Brno Circuit	Brno	Czech Republic	5.403 km (3.357 mi)	2008	1
**Circuit de Barcelona-Catalunya**	Montmeló	Spain	4.657 km (2.894 mi)	2021–2023, 2025, 2027	4
Circuit de Nevers Magny-Cours	Magny-Cours	France	4.411 km (2.741 mi)	2007, 2010	2
Circuit de Pau-Ville	Pau	France	2.760 km (1.715 mi)	2016	1
**Circuit de Spa-Francorchamps**	Stavelot	Belgium	7.004 km (4.352 mi)	2007–2011, 2013–2016, 2018, 2020–2027	17
Circuit Paul Armagnac	Nogaro	France	3.636 km (2.259 mi)	2007–2008, 2015	3
**Circuit Paul Ricard**	Le Castellet	France	5.842 km (3.630 mi)	2010, 2014, 2019–2027	10
Circuit Ricardo Tormo	Valencia	Spain	4.005 km (2.489 mi)	2022–2023	2
**Circuit Zandvoort**	Zandvoort	Netherlands	4.259 km (2.646 mi)	2011, 2013–2017, 2019–2021, 2025—2027	11
Circuit Zolder	Heusden-Zolder	Belgium	4.010 km (2.492 mi)	2009, 2011, 2018	3
Hockenheimring	Hockenheim	Germany	4.574 km (2.842 mi)	2022–2024	3
Hungaroring	Mogyoród	Hungary	4.381 km (2.722 mi)	2016, 2018	2
**Imola Circuit**	Emilia-Romagna	Italy	4.909 km (3.050 mi)	2020, 2022, 2027	2
Jeddah Corniche Circuit	Jeddah	Saudi Arabia	6.174 km (3.836 mi)	2024	1
**Misano World Circuit**	Misano Adriatico	Italy	4.226 km (2.626 mi)	2014–2015, 2017–2020, 2022–2027	11
Monza Circuit	Monza	Italy	5.793 km (3.600 mi)	2008, 2014, 2016, 2019, 2021, 2023–2024, 2026	8
Motorsport Arena Oschersleben	Oschersleben	Germany	3.696 km (2.297 mi)	2007–2009	3
Nürburgring	Nürburg	Germany	5.148 km (3.199 mi)	2010, 2014–2015, 2017–2021, 2025	9
Red Bull Ring	Spielberg	Austria	4.326 km (2.688 mi)	2015, 2017	2
Silverstone Circuit	Silverstone	United Kingdom	5.891 km (3.660 mi)	2007–2011, 2013, 2016	7
Slovakia Ring	Orechová Potôň	Slovakia	5.922 km (3.680 mi)	2017	1
TT Circuit Assen	Assen	Netherlands	4.555 km (2.830 mi)	2011, 2013	2
