= 2027 GT4 European Series =

Nineteenth season of the GT4 European Series

The 2027 GT4 European Series will mark the twentieth season of the GT4 European Series, organised by the SRO Motorsports Group. The races will be contested with GT4-spec cars. The season is scheduled to start on 16 April at Circuit Paul Ricard, with a pre-season prologue test on 15 April, and to finish on 24 October at the Circuit de Barcelona-Catalunya.

== Calendar ==
The calendar for the 2027 season was unveiled on 26 June 2026 at the SRO's annual 24 Hours of Spa press conference, featuring six rounds supporting the 2027 GT World Challenge Europe.

Round	Circuit	Date	Supporting	Map
1	Circuit Paul Ricard, Le Castellet, France	16–18 April	GT World Challenge Europe Endurance Cup	2027 GT4 European Series is located in Europe
2	Imola Circuit, Imola, Italy	21–23 May	GT World Challenge Europe Endurance Cup	2027 GT4 European Series is located in Europe
3	Circuit de Spa-Francorchamps, Stavelot, Belgium	24–27 June	Intercontinental GT Challenge; GT World Challenge Europe Endurance Cup	2027 GT4 European Series is located in Europe
4	Misano World Circuit, Misano, Italy	16–18 July	GT World Challenge Europe Sprint Cup	2027 GT4 European Series is located in Europe
5	Circuit Zandvoort, Zandvoort, Netherlands	17–19 September	GT World Challenge Europe Sprint Cup	2027 GT4 European Series is located in Europe
6	Circuit de Barcelona-Catalunya, Montmeló, Spain	22–24 October	GT World Challenge Europe Endurance Cup	2027 GT4 European Series is located in Europe

== Entry list ==
Team	Car	Engine	No.	Drivers	Class	Rounds
(France) Chazel Technologie Course	Porsche 911 GT4 R (992.2)	Porsche 4.0 L Flat-6	93	TBA		TBC
(France) Chazel Technologie Course	Porsche 911 GT4 R (992.2)	Porsche 4.0 L Flat-6	93	TBA		TBC
(Germany) W&S Motorsport	Porsche 911 GT4 R (992.2)	Porsche 4.0 L Flat-6		TBA		TBC
(Germany) W&S Motorsport	Porsche 911 GT4 R (992.2)	Porsche 4.0 L Flat-6		TBA		TBC

Icon	Class
S	Silver Cup
PA	Pro-Am Cup
Am	Am Cup

== See also ==
- 2027 British GT Championship
- 2027 FFSA GT - GT4 France
- 2027 GT4 Italian Series
- 2027 GT4 America Series
- 2027 GT4 Australia Series
- 2027 GT4 Nordic Series
- 2027 SRO GT Cup
- 2027 SRO Japan Cup
