= SRO GT4 =

Class of race cars

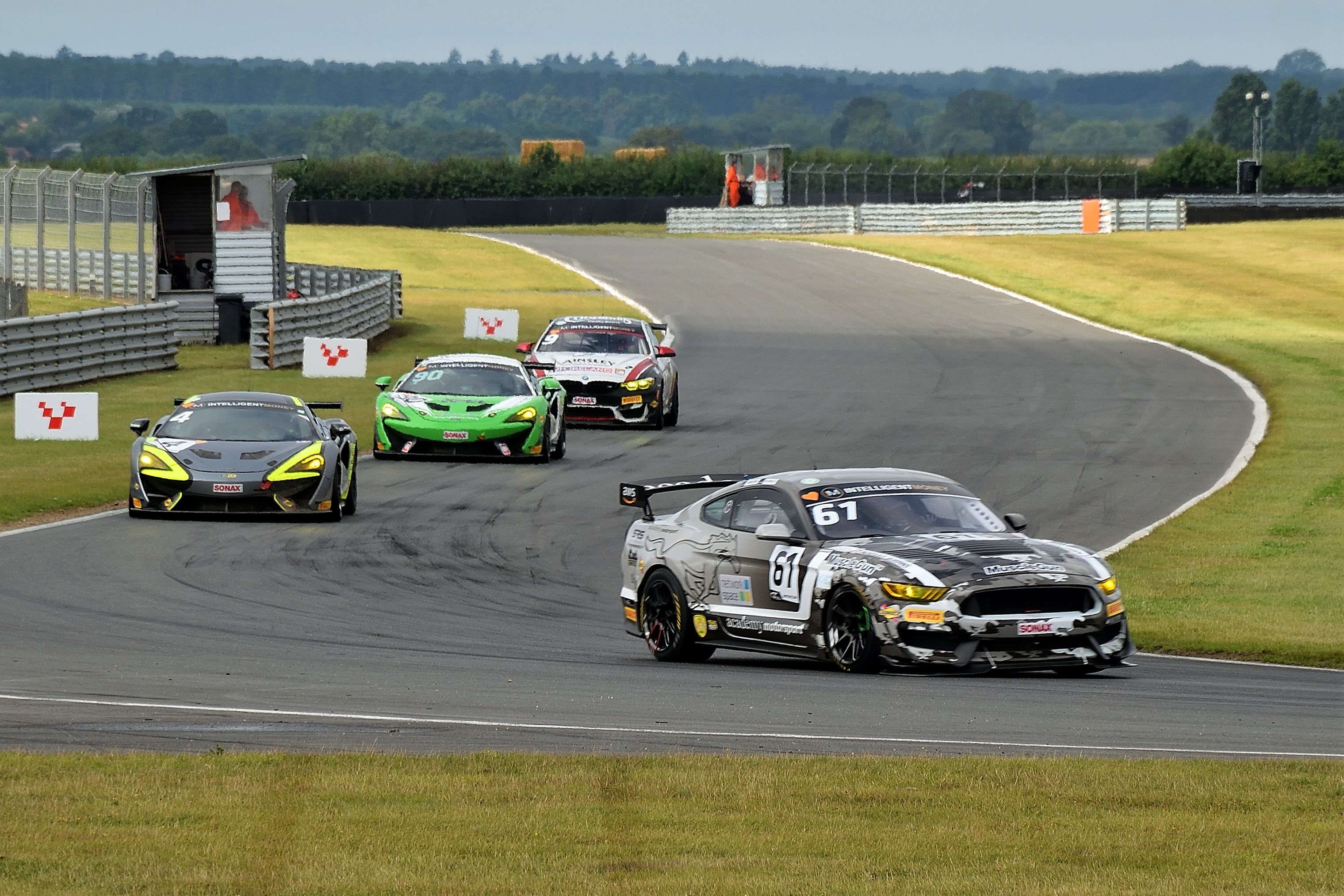
Several SRO GT4 cars in the British GT Championship

SRO GT4 is a class of grand tourer racing cars maintained by the SRO Motorsports Group that race in various auto racing series across the globe. It is an entry-level class aimed at amateur drivers. GT4 cars are production-based vehicles with a few modifications for racing. The cars are closer to their road legal counterparts than most other GT racing classes; they are also one of the least powerful GT categories. The class uses a balance of performance system to provide close competition between different race cars.

== History ==
The GT4 category was founded by the SRO at the end of 2006, and first introduced in 2007, racing in the GT4 European Cup as a cheaper alternative for GT3 racing. The category was also added to the British GT Championship in 2008. The SRO also founded the Dutch GT Championship in 2009. The GT4 class was also adapted by several other small national championships.

After an unsuccessful attempt to expand the category in 2012, the SRO introduced the GT4 European Trophy, consisting of five rounds from existing European Championships. This replaced the GT4 European Cup. In 2014, this series merged with the Dutch GT4 Championship to form the GT4 European series.

Due to a low number of entries, the SRO announced that the GT4 European series would be split into two championships, the GT4 European Series Northern Cup and the GT4 European Series Southern Cup. The Northern Cup would turn back into the GT4 European series, while the Southern Cup would turn into the FFSA GT Championship.

In North America, IMSA allows GT4 from mainstream manufacturers in the Grand Sport class of the Michelin Pilot Challenge since 2017, and in the Grand Sport X class of the IMSA VP Racing SportsCar Challenge since its inaugural season in 2023.

== Homologated vehicles ==
As of October 2024, over 50 vehicles have gone through the homologation project with the RACB. GT4 cars can either directly be built by the automotive manufacturer, or by race teams and tuning companies.

Nr.	Manufacturer	Model	Developer	Debut	Expiration	Image	Notes
RACB GT4-001	Maserati	Trofeo Light GT4	Scuderia Giudici	23 January 2004	31 December 2011		
RACB GT4-002	Ford	Mustang FR500C (S197)	Multimatic Motorsports	9 February 2005	31 December 2011		
RACB GT4-003	Aston Martin	V8 Vantage N24	Prodrive	3 June 2006	31 December 2011		
RACB GT4-004	BMW	Z4 M Coupé GT4 (E86)	G&A Racing	7 September 2006	31 December 2011		
RACB GT4-005	Nissan	350Z (Z33)	RJN Motorsport	5 May 2007	31 December 2011		
RACB GT4-006	Porsche	Cayman	GPR Racing	5 May 2007	31 December 2011		
RACB GT4-007	Ginetta	G50 GT4	Ginetta Cars	30 September 2007	31 December 2011		
RACB GT4-008	Peugeot	207 THP Spider	Peugeot Sport	5 May 2007	31 December 2011		
RACB GT4-009	Lotus	2-Eleven GT4 Supersport (Type 122)	Lotus Cars	13 April 2008	31 December 2011		
RACB GT4- 010	Chevrolet	Corvette C6 GT4	Callaway Cars	20 April 2008	31 December 2011		
RACB GT4-011	Donkervoort	D8 GT4	Donkervoort Racing	3 August 2008	31 December 2011		
RACB GT4-012	Aston Martin	V8 Vantage GT4	Prodrive	6 April 2009	31 December 2018		Includes: 2011 update
RACB GT4-013	Maserati	GranTurismo MC (M145)	Maserati	6 April 2009	31 December 2018		
RACB GT4-014	Lotus	Exige GT4 (Type 120)	Lotus	13 April 2009	31 December 2018		
RACB GT4-015	BMW	M3 GT4 (E92)	BMW Motorsport	13 April 2009	31 December 2018		
RACB GT4-016	Nissan	370Z NISMO GT4 (Z34)	RJN Motorsport	3 May 2009	31 December 2018		
RACB GT4-XXX	Bufori	BMS R1		22 November 2009			Never went through proper SRO GT4 Homologations. Competed in GT Cup classes only.
RACB GT4-017	Chevrolet	Camaro SS GT4	Riley Technologies	10 January 2010	31 December 2018		
RACB GT4-018	Porsche	911 GT4 (997.1)	GT3.nl	1 April 2010	31 December 2018		Includes: 2012 update
RACB GT4-019	Lotus	Evora Cup GT4 (Type 124)	Lotus Cars	28 August 2010	31 December 2018		
RACB GT4-020	Audi	TT GT4	Jorg Van Ommen Autosport	14 January 2012	31 December 2018		
RACB GT4-021	Mazda	MX-5 GT4 (NC)	Jota Sport	7 April 2012	31 December 2018		
RACB GT4-022	Toyota	GT86 GT4 (ZN6)	GPRM	13 February 2013	31 December 2018		
RACB GT4-023	Chevron	GR8 GT4	Chevron	13 February 2013	31 December 2021		
RACB GT4-024	Ginetta	G55 GT4	Ginetta Cars	7 April 2014	31 December 2021		
RACB GT4-025	KTM	X-Bow GT4	Reiter Engineering	5 January 2015	31 December 2026		Includes: X-Bow GT4 Evo
RACB GT4-026	SIN	R1 GT4	SIN	6 April 2015	31 December 2019		
RACB GT4-027	Porsche	Cayman GT4 Clubsport (981)	Manthey Racing	4 April 2016	31 December 2024		Includes: Cayman GT4 Clubsport MR (981)
RACB GT4-028	BMW	Ekris M4 GT4 (F82)	Ekris Motorsport	4 April 2016	31 December 2021		
RACB GT4-029	Porsche	Cayman SP PRO4 (981)	PROsport Performance	10 April 2016	31 December 2021		
RACB GT4-030	McLaren	570S GT4	McLaren	16 April 2016	31 December 2024		
RACB GT4-XXX	Hyundai	Genesis Coupé					Concept. Never went through Homologations.
RACB GT4-031	Maserati	GranTurismo MC GT4 (M145)	Maserati	24 April 2016	31 December 2024		
RACB GT4-032	Ford	Mustang GT4 (S550)	Multimatic Motorsports	28 January 2017	31 December 2024		6th Generation Mustang
RACB GT4-033	Chevrolet	Camaro GT4.R	Pratt & Miller	9 March 2017	31 December 2024		
RACB GT4-034	Panoz	Avezzano GT4	Élan Motorsport Technologies	10 March 2017	31 December 2024		
RACB GT4-035	Audi	R8 LMS GT4 (Type 4S)	Audi Sport	10 April 2017	31 December 2029 (Active)		Includes: R8 LMS GT4 evo (Type 4S)
RACB GT4-036	BMW	M4 GT4 (F82)	BMW Motorsport	24 May 2017	31 December 2028 (Active)		Includes: M4 GT4 EVO 2021 (F82)
RACB GT4-037	Mercedes-AMG	GT4 (C190)	HWA	30 July 2017	31 December 2031 (Active)		Includes: 2025 Evo updates
RACB GT4-038	Alpine	A110 GT4	Signatech	6 March 2018	31 December 2031 (Active)		Includes: A110 GT4 Evo; A110 GT4+
RACB GT4-XXX	Radical	RXC					Failed GT4 Homologation process.
RACB GT4-039	Jaguar	F-Type SVR GT4	Invictus Games Racing	31 March 2018	31 December 2024		
RACB GT4-040	Aston Martin	Vantage AMR GT4 (AM6)	Prodrive	30 April 2018	31 December 2029 (Active)		
RACB GT4-041	Porsche	718 Cayman GT4 Clubsport (982)	Manthey Racing	3 January 2019	31 December 2029 (Active)		Includes: 718 Cayman GT4 Clubsport MR (982)
RACB GT4-042	Toyota	GR Supra GT4 (J29/DB)	Toyota Gazoo Racing	4 March 2019	31 December 2031 (Active)		Includes: GR Supra GT4 EVO (J29/DB); GR Supra GT4 EVO2 (J29/DB)
RACB GT4-XXX	Saleen	S1	Saleen	Planned for 2020 Season			Homologations failed. Competed as invitational only.
RACB GT4-043	Ginetta	G56 GT4	Ginetta Cars	2 March 2021	31 December 2030 (Active)		Includes: G56 GT4 Evo
RACB GT4-044	Porsche	718 Cayman GT4 RS Clubsport (982)	Porsche	17 November 2021	31 December 2031 (Active)		
RACB GT4-045	Lotus	Emira GT4	Lotus	5 May 2022	31 December 2029 (Active)		
RACB GT4-046	BMW	M4 GT4 (G82)	BMW Motorsport	17 June 2022	31 December 2029 (Active)		Includes: M4 GT4 EVO (G82)
RACB GT4-047	McLaren	Artura GT4	McLaren	23 June 2022	31 December 2029 (Active)		
RACB GT4-048	Nissan	Z NISMO GT4 (RZ34)	NISMO	27 September 2022	31 December 2030 (Active)		
RACB GT4-049	Ford	Mustang GT4 (S650)	Multimatic Motorsports	28 June 2023	31 December 2030 (Active)		7th Generation Mustang
RACB GT4-050	Aston Martin	Vantage AMR GT4 Evo (AM6)	Prodrive	27 February 2024	31 December 2030 (Active)		Updated version for 2024 onward.

== Series ==
SRO GT4 cars have been either exclusive to or in a distinct class in each of the following series.

As premier class

- ADAC GT4 Germany
- FFSA GT Championship
- GTC Endurance Challenge
- GT4 America Series
- GT4 Australia Series
- GT4 European Series
- GT4 Italy
- GT4 Russia
- GT4 Winter Series
- Michelin Pilot Challenge
- Scandinavian Touring Car Championship
- SRO GT Cup
- Supercars Endurance Series(GT4 South)
- Summerset GT New Zealand Championship

As subsidiary class

- 24H Series
- 24H Series Middle East
- APEX One
- Austrian GT
- Baltic Touring Car Championship
- Belcar
- Britcar
- British GT Championship
- Campeonato de España de GT
- China Endurance Championship
- China GT Championship
- CEZ Circuit Endurance
- Danish Endurance Championship
- DMV Super Touring & GT Cup
- Endurance Brasil
- Golf Pro Car
- GT America Series
- GT Cup Championship
- GT Cup Open Europe
- GT Cup Series
- GT Series Cup Brasil
- GT Summer Series
- GT Winter Series
- IMSA VP Racing SportsCar Challenge
- International GT
- Nürburgring Langstrecken series
- Pikes Peaks International Hill Climb
- SRO Japan Cup
- Supercar Challenge
- Superrace Championship
- Super Taikyu Series
- Thailand Super Series
- Ultimate Cup Series
- World Racing league

== See also ==
- Group 3
- Group 4
- Group 5
- Group B
- Group GT1
- Group N-GT
- Group GT2
- Group GT3
- SRO GT2
