= 2013 GT4 European Trophy =

The 2013 Avon GT4 European Trophy season was the 6th season of the GT4 European Cup. The trophy name was carried out only this season. The season began on 26 May at Silverstone, and finished on 13 October at Zandvoort after five race weekends.

== Race calendar and results ==
| Round | | Circuit | Date | Pole position | Fastest lap | Race winner |
|---|---|---|---|---|---|---|
| 1 | R1 | (United Kingdom) Silverstone Circuit | 25 May | No.8 Ekris Motorsport | No. | No.7 Pro Sport Performance |
| 1 | R1 | (United Kingdom) Silverstone Circuit | 25 May | (Netherlands) Ricardo van der Ende (Netherlands) Bernhard van Oranje | | (Germany) Jörg Viebahn (United Kingdom) Adam Christodoulou |
| 1 | R2 | (United Kingdom) Silverstone Circuit | 26 May | No. | No. | No.9 Las Moras Racing Team |
| 1 | R2 | (United Kingdom) Silverstone Circuit | 26 May | | | (Netherlands) Duncan Huisman |
| 1 | R3 | (United Kingdom) Silverstone Circuit | 26 May | No. | No. | No.8 Ekris Motorsport |
| 1 | R3 | (United Kingdom) Silverstone Circuit | 26 May | | | (Netherlands) Bernhard van Oranje |
| 2 | R1 | (Netherlands) TT Circuit Assen | 8 June | No.9 Las Moras Racing Team | No.9 Las Moras Racing Team | No.9 Las Moras Racing Team |
| 2 | R1 | (Netherlands) TT Circuit Assen | 8 June | (Netherlands) Duncan Huisman | (Netherlands) Duncan Huisman | (Netherlands) Duncan Huisman |
| 2 | R2 | (Netherlands) TT Circuit Assen | 9 June | No.8 Ekris Motorsport | No. | No.8 Ekris Motorsport |
| 2 | R2 | (Netherlands) TT Circuit Assen | 9 June | (Netherlands) Bernhard van Oranje | | (Netherlands) Bernhard van Oranje |
| 2 | R3 | (Netherlands) TT Circuit Assen | 9 June | No.8 Ekris Motorsport | No. | No.9 Las Moras Racing Team |
| 2 | R3 | (Netherlands) TT Circuit Assen | 9 June | (Netherlands) Ricardo van der Ende (Netherlands) Bernhard van Oranje | | (Netherlands) Luc Braams (Netherlands) Duncan Huisman |
| 3 | R1 | (Belgium) Circuit de Spa-Francorchamps | 26 July | No.12 Las Moras Racing Team | No. | No.12 Las Moras Racing Team |
| 3 | R1 | (Belgium) Circuit de Spa-Francorchamps | 26 July | (Netherlands) Max Braams | | (Netherlands) Max Braams |
| 3 | R2 | (Belgium) Circuit de Spa-Francorchamps | 27 July | No.12 Las Moras Racing Team | No. | No.8 Ekris Motorsport |
| 3 | R2 | (Belgium) Circuit de Spa-Francorchamps | 27 July | (Netherlands) Max Braams (Netherlands) Bertus Sanders | | (Netherlands) Ricardo van der Ende (Netherlands) Bernhard van Oranje |
| 3 | R3 | (Belgium) Circuit de Spa-Francorchamps | 27 July | No.9 Las Moras Racing Team | No. | No.9 Las Moras Racing Team |
| 3 | R3 | (Belgium) Circuit de Spa-Francorchamps | 27 July | (Netherlands) Duncan Huisman | | (Netherlands) Duncan Huisman |
| 4 | R1 | (Sweden) Anderstorp Raceway | 17 August | No.12 Las Moras Racing Team | No.10 Ricknaes Motorsport | No.12 Las Moras Racing Team |
| 4 | R1 | (Sweden) Anderstorp Raceway | 17 August | (Netherlands) Max Braams (Netherlands) Bertus Sanders | (Sweden) Philip Forsman (Sweden) Hakan Ricknaes | (Netherlands) Max Braams (Netherlands) Bertus Sanders |
| 4 | R2 | (Sweden) Anderstorp Raceway | 18 August | No.6 HDI Gerling | No. | No.6 HDI Gerling |
| 4 | R2 | (Sweden) Anderstorp Raceway | 18 August | (Netherlands) Kelvin Snoeks (Netherlands) Maik Barten | | (Netherlands) Kelvin Snoeks (Netherlands) Maik Barten |
| 5 | R1 | (Netherlands) Circuit Park Zandvoort | 12 October | No.8 Ekris Motorsport | No. | No.18 Ekris Motorsport |
| 5 | R1 | (Netherlands) Circuit Park Zandvoort | 12 October | André de Vries | | (Netherlands) PC van Oranje |
| 5 | R2 | (Netherlands) Circuit Park Zandvoort | 13 October | No.8 Ekris Motorsport | No. | No.9 Las Moras Racing Team |
| 5 | R2 | (Netherlands) Circuit Park Zandvoort | 13 October | (Netherlands) Ricardo van der Ende | | (Netherlands) Duncan Huisman |
| 5 | R3 | (Netherlands) Circuit Park Zandvoort | 13 October | Race cancelled (Extreme rain) | | |
