= Dutch GT Championship =

- Category: FIA Grand Tourer 4 (GT4)
- Country: Netherlands; Belgium; Germany; Slovakia
- Inaugural season: 2009
- Folded: 2013
- Tyre suppliers: Avon
- Last Drivers' champion: (Netherlands) Duncan Huisman
- Official website: dutchgt.nl

The HDI-Gerling Dutch GT Championship was an auto racing championship based in the Netherlands. The series, founded in 2009 by the SRO Group as the Dutch GT4 Championship, uses grand tourer cars conforming to the Fédération Internationale de l'Automobile GT4 regulations.

Based on the GT4 European Cup, the Dutch GT Championship concentrates on the Benelux region, with several races per season held at the Circuit Park Zandvoort in the Netherlands, while also visiting circuits such as the TT Circuit Assen as well as the Circuit de Spa-Francorchamps and Circuit Zolder in Belgium. In recent years races have also been added in Germany and Slovakia.

Dominant cars in the series include the BMW M3, Porsche 911, Chevrolet Corvette, Chevrolet Camaro, Toyota GT-86, Lotus Evora, Ginetta G50, and Aston Martin V8 Vantage. Events follow a format of two 25 minutes races, followed by a 50 minutes final race, although some events shared with other series use a modified format.

The series was originally sponsored by Tango and CMA CGM, before HTC became the title sponsor in 2010 and 2011. HDI-Gerling became the series sponsor for 2012. Dutch driver Ricardo van der Ende is the defending series champion, driving for Racing Team Holland BMW.

Become GT4 European Series merged with GT4 European Cup in 2014.

== Champions ==
Season	Drivers Champion(s)
2009	(Netherlands) Christiaan Frankenhout
2010	(Netherlands) Phil Bastiaans
2011	(Netherlands) Ricardo van der Ende
2012	(Netherlands) Ferdinand Kool
2013	(Netherlands) Duncan Huisman
