= Ricardo van der Ende =

Dutch racing driver

- Nationality: (Netherlands) Dutch
- Born: 13 July 1979 (age 47) Poeldijk (Netherlands)
- Relatives: Jacky van der Ende (brother)
- Categorisation: FIA Silver

Championship titles
- 1998 1999 2001 2007 2011 2011 2017: British Formula Ford (Winter); Formula Ford Festival; Formula Chrysler Euroseries; BMW 130i Cup; Dutch GT4 Championship; GT4 European Cup

Ricardo van der Ende (born 13 July 1979 in Poeldijk) is a Dutch racing driver. He won the 2001 Formula Chrysler Euroseries season with the Belgian team of Vortex Motorsport. He also won the Winter Series of the British Formula Ford Championship in 1998 and the Formula Ford Festival in 1999. Later on, he went karting and became Dutch champion of the Dutch Rotax Max Challenge in 2003. In 2004, he became European and French karting champion of ICC 125cc. He switched to single-seat race cars in 2004. In 2005, he began touring car racing, and drove the Dutch BMW 130i Cup in 2006. He placed second that year. In 2007, van der Ende was crowned champion. In 2009, he competed in the Dutch GT4 Championship with a BMW M3 GT4, where he came in second in the final ranking. 2009 was less successful for van der Ende, and he finished sixth in the Dutch GT4 Championship. In 2011, he came back to win the Dutch title. In the final race of the 2011 season, he earned the GT4 European Cup as well, edging out Stefano D'Aste, who finished second, Van der Ende won the title again in 2017 with Max Koebolt in the Silver Cup. He most recently competed in the GT4 European Cup in 2019 alongside British driver Euan McKay.

Sporting positions
Preceded by Phil Bastiaans	Dutch GT Championship; Champion; 2011	Succeeded by Ferdinand Kool
