= Prince Bernhard of Orange-Nassau, van Vollenhoven =

Dutch Royal (born 1969)

Prince Bernhard
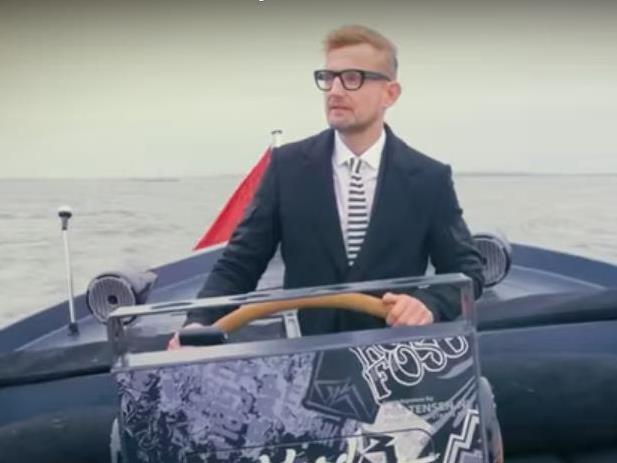
- Prince Bernhard in 2016
- Born: 25 December 1969 (age 56); Nijmegen, Netherlands
- Spouse: Annette Sekrève (m. 2000; sep. 2026)
- Issue: Isabella van Vollenhoven; Samuel van Vollenhoven; Benjamin van Vollenhoven
Names
- Bernhard Lucas Emmanuel
- House: Orange-Nassau
- Father: Pieter van Vollenhoven
- Mother: Princess Margriet of the Netherlands
- Categorisation: FIA Bronze

Prince Bernhard Lucas Emmanuel of Orange-Nassau, van Vollenhoven (born 25 December 1969) is a Dutch racing driver, entrepreneur and member of the Dutch royal family.

He is the second son of Princess Margriet of the Netherlands and Pieter van Vollenhoven. Before the succession of his cousin Willem-Alexander as King, he was a member of the Dutch Royal House and eleventh in the line of succession to the Dutch throne. With Willem-Alexander's succession however, he is no longer a member of the Dutch Royal House, and is no longer in line to direct succession to the Dutch throne, but still retains his membership of the Dutch royal family

== Early life and education ==
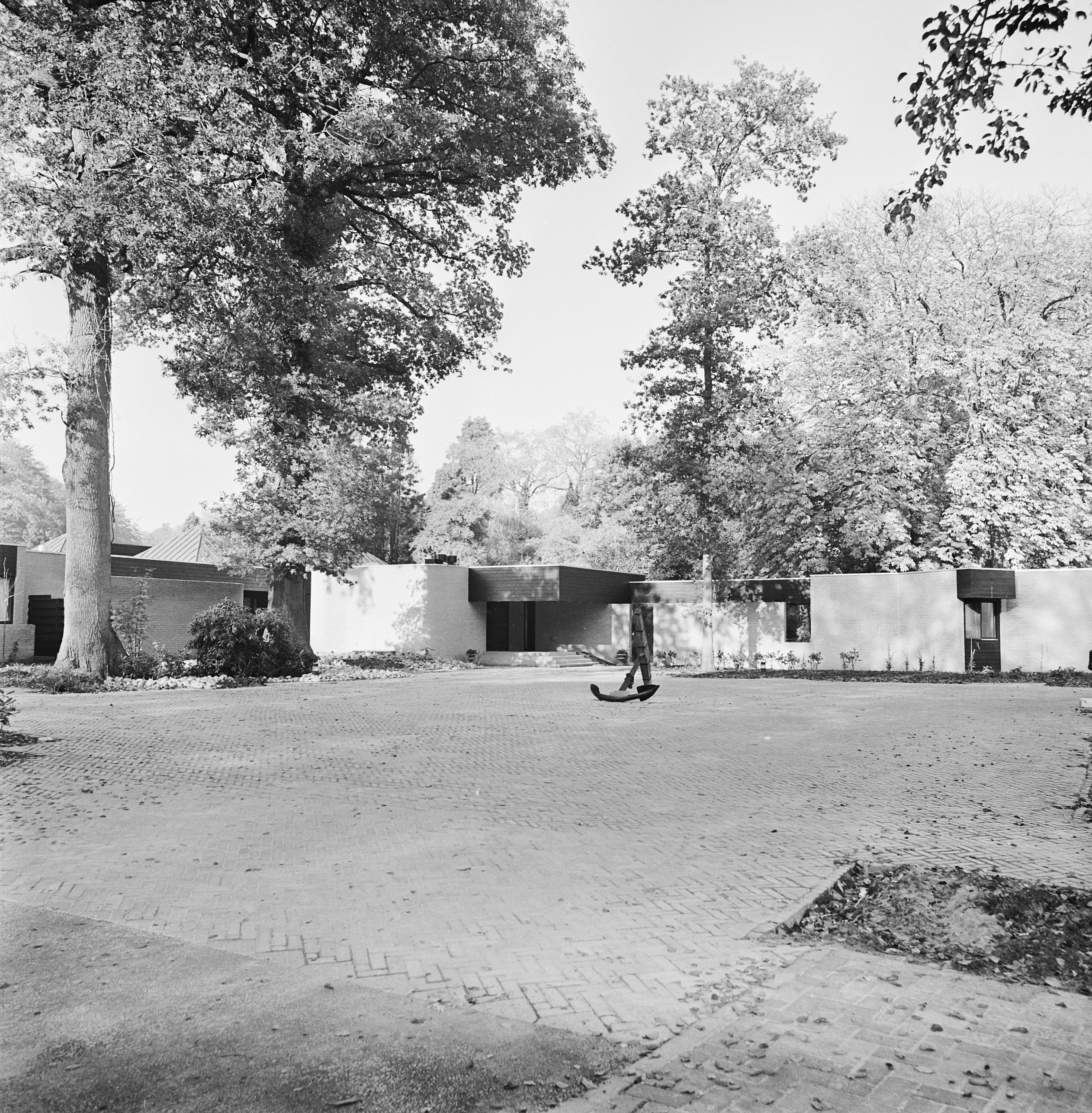
Het Loo House, the prince's childhood residence, in Apeldoorn in 1975

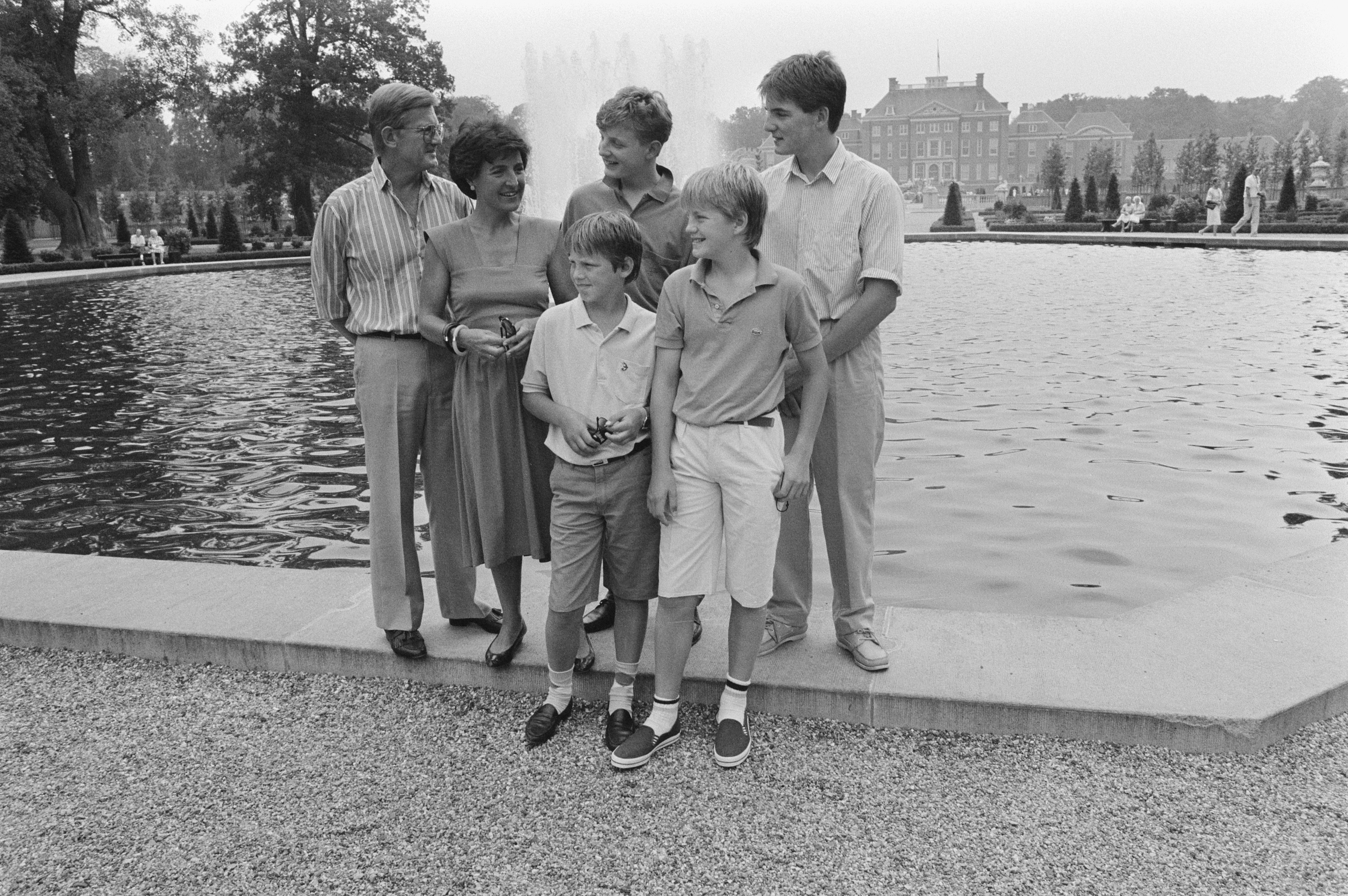
Family portrait with Prince Bernhard (centre, back row) in 1986

Bernhard was born on 25 December 1969 in Nijmegen in the Netherlands. He is the second son of Princess Margriet and Pieter van Vollenhoven. He has three brothers: Princes Maurits, Pieter-Christiaan, and Floris.

His family lived in Apeldoorn throughout his childhood, moving to Het Loo House in 1975. He received both his primary and secondary education in Apeldoorn.

He studied economics in 1988 at Georgetown University in Washington, D.C. Subsequently, in 1989 he attended Groningen University in the Netherlands where he studied marketing and market research. In 1995 he received the degree of doctorandus (equivalent to Master of Science) at this university.

== Business ==
Bernhard is a self-employed entrepreneur.

=== Ritzen Koeriers ===
In 1991, he founded the company Ritzen Koeriers with three fellow students. It was a courier business that used students to deliver packages by public transport using the free public transport card for students that education minister Jo Ritzen had introduced earlier that year. In 1999, the company was suspected of fraud, because they were not paying payroll taxes over lease cars provided to some employees. In 2000, the company settled with the Public Prosecution Service for 12,000 euros. In 2002, the name Ritzen Koeriers was changed to Logistieke Meesters, at which time Bernhard was no longer involved in the business.

=== Levi9 Global Sourcing ===
He is a co-founder of a nearshoring IT company called Levi9 Global Sourcing.

=== Chapman Andretti Partners ===
In 2015, he founded the company Chapman Andretti Partners with Menno de Jong, named after Colin Chapman and Mario Andretti who are not personally related to the business. In 2016, the company bought the Circuit Zandvoort in Zandvoort. Circuit Zandvoort was scheduled to host the Dutch Grand Prix in 2020, but it was postponed to 2021 due to COVID-19. Several environmental groups litigated against the racing event to be held in the natural dunes, but were unable to stop it. In 2021, the company was criticized for having asked musicians including the band Chef'Special to perform at the Grand Prix without direct financial compensation.

== Marriage and family ==
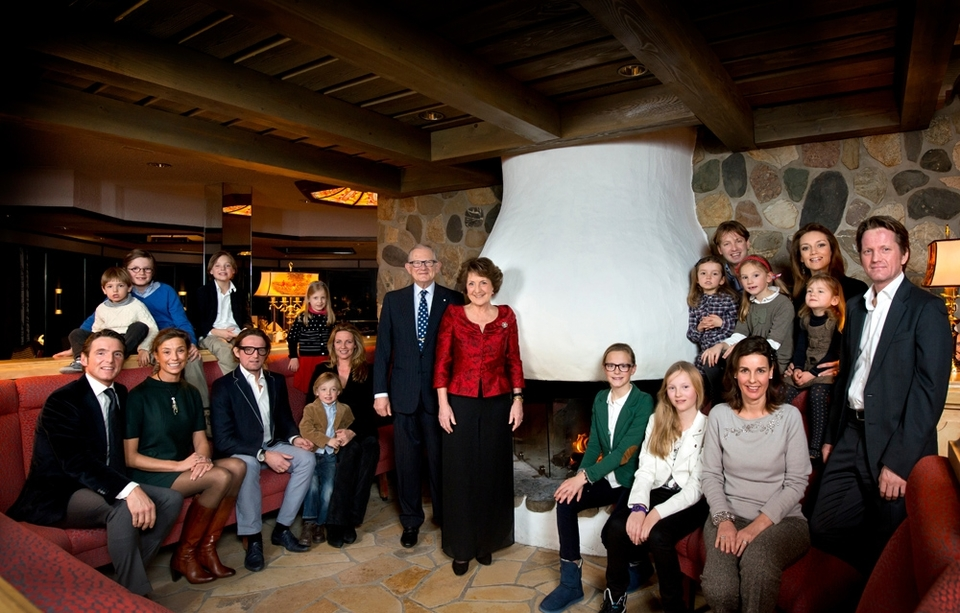
Prince Bernhard (sitting, front row, third from the left) with his wife, children, parents, siblings, and their families in 2013

While studying in Groningen, Bernhard met Annette Sekrève (born 18 April 1972). The couple announced their engagement on 11 March 2000. They married in July 2000. The civil ceremony was performed on 6 July 2000 by the Mayor of Utrecht, Annie Brouwer-Korf, in the Spiegelzaal of the Paushuize in Utrecht. The marriage was blessed two days later, on 8 July 2000, by Dr Anne van der Meiden in the Cathedral of Saint Martin, Utrecht. They have three children: Isabella Lily Juliana (born 2002), Samuel Bernhard Louis (born 2004), and Benjamin Pieter Floris (born 2008). According to a royal decree of 5 July 2000, the children were granted the family name van Vollenhoven, without titles. In January 2026, Bernhard and Annette announced that they were to divorce.

Upon the announcement of the planned abdication of Queen Beatrix, which took place on 30 April 2013, it was also restated that after the abdication, the children of Princess Margriet and Pieter van Vollenhoven would no longer be eligible for the throne. They would also cease to be members of the Royal House. He is still a member of the extended royal family, but he rarely takes part in official duties.

== Health ==
Bernhard has been receiving treatment for Crohn's disease since 2002.

In 2013, he was diagnosed with Non-Hodgkin lymphoma, for which he has been on the intensive care for a month. After his recovery, he created the foundation Lymph & Co, which has spent over 2 million euros on lymphoma research.
