= Duncan Huisman =

Dutch racing driver

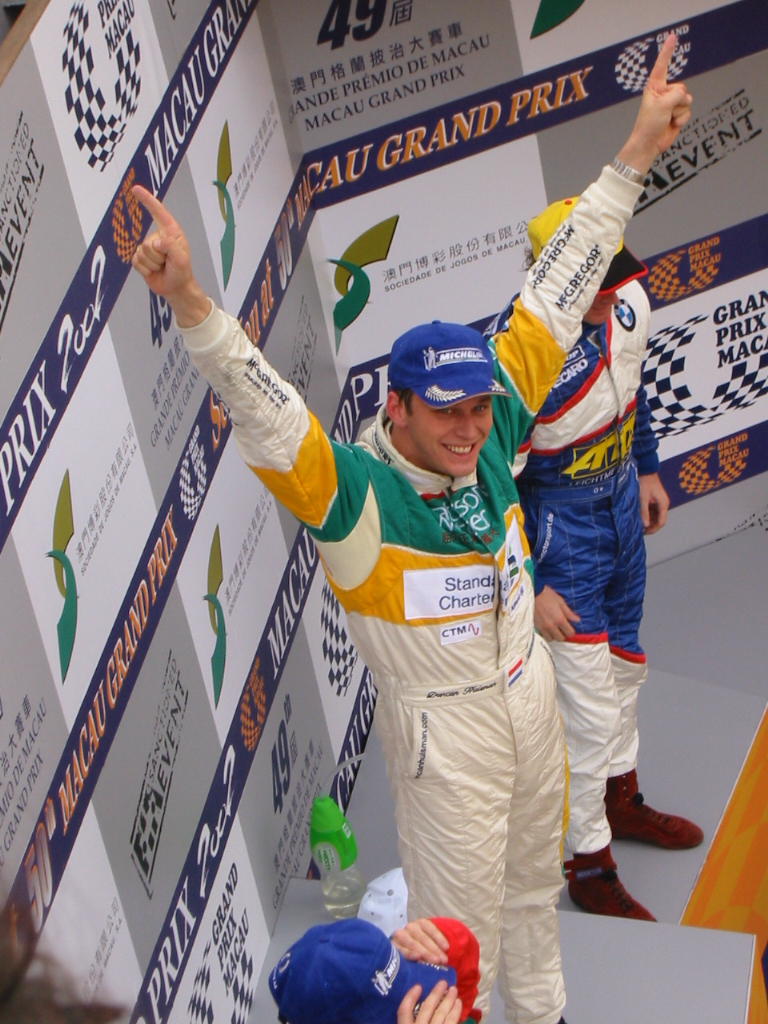
- Duncan Huisman on the podium after his victory in the 2002 Macau Guia Race.
- Nationality: (Netherlands) Dutch
- Born: 11 November 1971 (age 54) Doornspijk, Gelderland, Netherlands
- Relatives: Patrick Huisman (brother)
- Categorisation: FIA Gold (until 2016); FIA Silver (2017–2026); FIA Bronze (2027–)

Duncan Huisman (born 11 November 1971 in Doornspijk, Gelderland) is a Dutch racing driver. He won the Guia Race four times and the 24 Hours of Nürburgring in 2005. He claimed three titles at the Dutch Touring Car Championship in 1997, 2000 and 2002, and resulted runner-up at the 2010 and 2011 Dutch GT4 Championship. He has also competed in the FIA GT Championship and the Porsche Supercup. His older brother Patrick is also a successful racing driver.

== Touring car racing ==
Huisman is three times Dutch Touring Car Champion, having won the title in 1997, 2000 and 2001 in a BMW 3 Series.

Between 2001 and 2004, Huisman drove in the European Touring Car Championship, before it was renamed the World Touring Car Championship. In 2005, he first drove in the WTCC for the final two rounds with BMW Team UK, winning in what was only his second race. He competed for just over half a season in 2006 for BMW Team Italy/Spain finishing the season thirteenth overall. Duncan drove for the WSR-managed Team Aviva in the WTCC event in Macau at the end of 2007 prompting speculation that he would join Team RAC in the 2008 British Touring Car Championship (BTCC) alongside Colin Turkington following the departure of Tom Onslow-Cole to Vauxhall's VXR Racing. Stephen Jelley was Onslow-Coles replacement, and Huisman returned again for just two 2008 WTCC rounds at Oschersleben for Wiechers-Sport in a BMW 320si.

== Racing record ==
=== Complete World Touring Car Championship results ===
(key) (Races in bold indicate pole position) (Races in italics indicate fastest lap)

Year	Team	Car	1	2	3	4	5	6	7	8	9	10	11	12	13	14	15	16	17	18	19	20	21	22	23	24	DC	Points
2005	BMW Team Holland	BMW 320i	ITA; 1	ITA; 2	FRA; 1	FRA; 2	GBR; 1	GBR; 2	SMR; 1	SMR; 2	MEX; 1	MEX; 2	BEL; 1	BEL; 2	GER; 1	GER; 2	TUR; 1	TUR; 2	ESP; 1	ESP; 2	MAC; 1; 6	MAC; 2; 1					13th	13
2006	BMW Team Italy-Spain	BMW 320si	ITA; 1	ITA; 2	FRA; 1	FRA; 2	GBR; 1	GBR; 2	GER; 1	GER; 2	BRA; 1; 11	BRA; 2; 16	MEX; 1; 21	MEX; 2; 11	CZE; 1; 18	CZE; 2; 9	TUR; 1; 5	TUR; 2; 10	ESP; 1; 7	ESP; 2; 2	MAC; 1; 2	MAC; 2; 13					13th	22
2007	Team AVIVA	BMW 320si	BRA; 1	BRA; 2	NED; 1	NED; 2	ESP; 1	ESP; 2	FRA; 1	FRA; 2	CZE; 1	CZE; 2	POR; 1	POR; 2	SWE; 1	SWE; 2	GER; 1	GER; 2	GBR; 1	GBR; 2	ITA; 1	ITA; 2	MAC; 1; 9	MAC; 2; 11			NC	0
2008	Wiechers-Sport	BMW 320si	BRA; 1	BRA; 2	MEX; 1	MEX; 2	ESP; 1	ESP; 2	FRA; 1	FRA; 2	CZE; 1	CZE; 2	POR; 1	POR; 2	GBR; 1	GBR; 2	GER; 1; 16	GER; 2; 10	EUR; 1	EUR; 2	ITA; 1	ITA; 2	JPN; 1	JPN; 2	MAC; 1	MAC; 2	24th	0

=== Complete GT1 World Championship results ===
Year	Team	Car	1	2	3	4	5	6	7	8	9	10	11	12	13	14	15	16	17	18	19	20	Pos	Points
2010	Mad-Croc Racing	Corvette	ABU; QR	ABU; CR	SIL; QR	SIL; CR	BRN; QR	BRN; CR	PRI; QR	PRI; CR	SPA; QR	SPA; CR	NÜR; QR	NÜR; CR	ALG; QR	ALG; CR	NAV; QR; 15	NAV; CR; Ret	INT; QR; 18	INT; CR; 19	SAN; QR; DNS	SAN; CR; DNS	55th	0

Sporting positions
Preceded by Fabrizio Giovanardi	European Touring Car Championship; Independents' Trophy winner 2003	Succeeded by Tom Coronel
Preceded by Ferdinand Kool	Dutch GT Championship; Champion; 2013	Succeeded by none
