= 2016 Finali Mondiali =

Seasons
- ← 2015 2017 →

(United States) 2016 Finali Mondiali
Event Information
- Date: 1–4 December
- Location: Daytona Beach, Florida, United States
- Venue: Daytona International Speedway
- Weather: Sunny

Results
Race 1
| Distance | 18 laps | 103.140 km |
| Winner | (Venezuela) Carlos Kauffmann; Ferrari of Fort Lauderdale | 35:34.609 |
Race 2
| Distance | 18 laps | 103.140 km |
| Winner | (United Kingdom) Sam Smeeth; Stratstone Ferrari | 35:37.147 |
Race 3
| Distance | 19 laps | 108.870 km |
| Winner | (Germany) Thomas Löfflad; StileF Squadra Corse | 36:29.943 |

The 2016 Finali Mondiali was the 2016 edition of the season-ending event for all Ferrari Challenge championships. Held at the Daytona International Speedway in the United States for the first time, the event saw drivers from the Asia-Pacific, European and North American championships take part.

It was the last season in which the Ferrari 458 was used in the headline class, replaced in 2017 with the 488.

== Classification ==
=== Trofeo Pirelli ===
| Pos | Class | No. | Driver | Team | Laps | Time/Retired | Grid |
|---|---|---|---|---|---|---|---|
| 1 | Pro | 244 | (Venezuela) Carlos Kauffmann | (United States) Ferrari of Fort Lauderdale | 18 | 35:34.609 | 1 |
| 2 | Pro | 299 | (Canada) Wei Lu | (Canada) Ferrari of Vancouver | 18 | +2.201 | 11 |
| 3 | Pro-Am | 92 | (United Kingdom) Sam Smeeth | (United Kingdom) Stratstone Ferrari | 18 | +2.538 | 6 |
| 4 | Pro | 9 | (Italy) Marcello Puglisi | (Italy) Rossocorsa | 18 | +3.886 | 5 |
| 5 | Pro-Am | 13 | (Sweden) Martin Nelson | (Sweden) Scuderia Autoropa | 18 | +4.340 | 9 |
| 6 | Pro-Am | 39 | (Russia) Vladimir Atoev | Motor Service | 18 | +9.292 | 14 |
| 7 | Pro | 27 | (Italy) Alessandro Vezzoni | (Italy) Rossocorsa | 18 | +13.510 | 12 |
| 8 | Pro | 410 | (Indonesia) Renaldi Hutasoit | (Indonesia) Ferrari Jakarta | 18 | +16.867 | 10 |
| 9 | Pro-Am | 439 | (China) Hui-Lin Han | (China) CTF Beijing | 18 | +17.783 | 13 |
| 10 | Pro | 202 | (United States) Rusty Wallace | (United States) Ferrari of Houston | 18 | +17.869 | 23 |
| 11 | Pro-Am | 276 | (United States) Joel Weinberger | (United States) Continental AutoSports | 18 | +19.762 | 20 |
| 12 | Pro-Am | 233 | (United States) Arthur Romanelli | (United States) The Collection | 18 | +20.285 | 21 |
| 13 | Pro | 477 | (Australia) Steve Wyatt | (Australia) Alf Barbagallo Motors | 18 | +20.689 | 19 |
| 14 | Pro-Am | 285 | (United States) Steve Johnson | (United States) Ferrari of Fort Lauderdale | 18 | +20.795 | 22 |
| 15 | Pro-Am | 97 | (Italy) Tommaso Rocca | (Italy) Rossocorsa | 18 | +28.242 | 26 |
| 16 | Pro-Am | 468 | (China) Yan-Bin Xing | (China) CTF Beijing | 18 | +31.194 | 27 |
| 17 | Pro-Am | 213 | (Canada) Marc Muzzo | (Canada) Ferrari of Ontario | 18 | +1:10.425 | 15 |
| 18 | Pro-Am | 19 | (Denmark) Per Nielsen | (Denmark) Formula Racing | 18 | +1:10.472 | 29 |
| 19 | Pro | 1 | (Germany) Björn Grossmann | (Switzerland) Octane126 | 16 | +2 Laps | 3 |
| 20 | Pro | 68 | (Switzerland) Fabio Leimer | (Switzerland) Octane126 | 14 | +4 Laps | 2 |
| 21 | Pro-Am | 41 | (France) Fréderic Jean-Marie Fangio | Motor Service | 14 | +4 Laps | 25 |
| 22 | Pro | 91 | (Austria) Philipp Baron | (Italy) Rossocorsa | 14 | +4 Laps | 8 |
| NC | Pro-Am | 59 | (Canada) John Farano | (Italy) Rossocorsa | 10 | | 17 |
| NC | Pro-Am | 221 | (United States) Danny Baker | (United States) Ferrari of Palm Beach | 9 | | 28 |
| NC | Pro | 401 | (Belgium) Florian Merckx | Motor Service | 7 | | 4 |
| NC | Pro-Am | 218 | (United States) James Weiland | (United States) Boardwalk Ferrari | 2 | | 16 |
| NC | Pro-Am | 470 | (China) Xin Jin | (China) Prestige Harbin | 2 | | 24 |
| NC | Pro | 207 | (Mexico) Martin Fuentes | (United States) Ferrari of Beverly Hills | 2 | | 7 |
| NC | Pro-Am | 10 | (Sweden) Henrik Hedman | (Sweden) Scuderia Autoropa | 1 | | 18 |
Fastest lap set by Fabio Leimer: 1:49.864

=== Coppa Shell ===
| Pos | Class | No. | Driver | Team | Laps | Time/Retired | Grid |
|---|---|---|---|---|---|---|---|
| 1 | Am | 151 | (Germany) Thomas Löfflad | (San Marino) StileF Squadra Corse | 19 | 36:29.943 | 3 |
| 2 | Am | 144 | (Czech Republic) Vladimir Hladik | Motor Service | 19 | +0.690 | 4 |
| 3 | Am | 112 | (Canada) Rick Lovat | (Switzerland) Kessel Racing | 19 | +1.976 | 2 |
| 4 | Am | 351 | (United States) Robert Hodes | (United States) Ferrari of Washington | 19 | +2.562 | 8 |
| 5 | Am | 177 | (Netherlands) Fons Scheltema | (Switzerland) Kessel Racing | 19 | +2.987 | 7 |
| 6 | Am | 399 | (Canada) Barry Zekelman | (Canada) Ferrari of Ontario | 19 | +3.351 | 5 |
| 7 | Am | 152 | (Italy) Renato di Amato | (Italy) CDP | 19 | +3.994 | 9 |
| 8 | Am | 306 | (United States) Karl Williams | (United States) Ferrari of Beverly Hills | 19 | +4.608 | 11 |
| 9 | Am | 161 | (Italy) Thomas Gostner | (Italy) Ineco - MP Racing | 19 | +4.829 | 15 |
| 10 | Am | 377 | (United States) Joe Courtney | (United States) Miller Motor Cars | 19 | +6.368 | 13 |
| 11 | Am | 127 | (Sweden) Thomas Lindroth | Motor Service | 19 | +7.297 | 18 |
| 12 | Am | 173 | (Italy) Corinna Gostner | (Italy) Ineco - MP Racing | 19 | +9.740 | 17 |
| 13 | Am | 131 | (Greece) Kriton Lendoudis | Motor Service | 19 | +12.401 | 26 |
| 14 | Am | 128 | (Sweden) Christian Kinch | (Germany) Gohm Motorsport | 19 | +13.610 | 19 |
| 15 | Am | 550 | (China) Yuan Yang | (China) CTF Beijing | 19 | +14.445 | 20 |
| 16 | Am | 387 | (United States) Richard Baek | (United States) Ron Tonkin Gran Turismo | 19 | +14.971 | 24 |
| 17 | Am | 199 | (Sweden) Ingvar Mattsson | (Sweden) Scuderia Autoropa | 19 | +17.532 | 21 |
| 18 | Am | 507 | (Japan) Ken Seto | (Japan) Rosso Scuderia Tokyo | 19 | +18.108 | 25 |
| 19 | Am | 304 | (United States) David Musial | (United States) Lake Forest Sportscars | 19 | +22.824 | 29 |
| 20 | Am | 334 | (United States) Michael Watt | (United States) Ferrari of Atlanta | 19 | +24.016 | 28 |
| 21 | Am | 313 | (United States) Geoff Palermo | (United States) Ferrari of San Francisco | 19 | +25.849 | 30 |
| 22 | Am | 102 | (Italy) Claudio Schiavoni | (Switzerland) Scuderia Niki Hasler | 19 | +33.819 | 22 |
| 23 | Am | 376 | (United States) Lance Cawley | (United States) Ferrari of Atlanta | 19 | +36.715 | 32 |
| 24 | Am | 108 | (France) Deborah Mayer | (Switzerland) Scuderia Niki Hasler | 19 | +37.829 | 27 |
| 25 | Am | 325 | (United States) Matthew Keegan | (United States) Ferrari of San Francisco | 19 | +40.557 | 1 |
| 26 | Am | 311 | (United States) Joseph Vitagliano | (United States) Ferrari of Long Island | 19 | +50.529 | 33 |
| 27 | Am | 378 | (United States) Alan Hegyi | (United States) Ferrari of San Diego | 18 | +1 Lap | 36 |
| 28 | Am | 157 | (Lebanon) Tani Hanna | Motor Service | 18 | +1 Lap | 10 |
| 29 | Am | 323 | (United States) Alexander Menzel | (United States) The Collection | 18 | +1 Lap | 31 |
| 30 | Am | 111 | (Germany) Holger Harmsen | (Germany) Lüg Sportivo | 17 | +2 Laps | 16 |
| NC | Am | 586 | (China) Xiao Min | (China) CTF Beijing | 12 | | 23 |
| NC | Am | 321 | (Mexico) Luis Perusquia | (United States) Ferrari of Tampa Bay | 11 | | 34 |
| NC | Am | 181 | (Italy) Erich Prinoth | (Italy) Ineco - MP Racing | 8 | | 6 |
| NC | Am | 564 | (Australia) Paul Montague | (Australia) Alf Barbagallo Motors | 4 | | 35 |
| NC | Am | 183 | (Italy) Manuela Gostner | (Italy) Ineco - MP Racing | 1 | | 12 |
| NC | Am | 596 | (China) Liang Wang | (Australia) CTF Beijing | 1 | | 14 |
Fastest lap set by Thomas Löfflad: 1:49.593

== See also ==
- 2016 Ferrari Challenge North America
