= Frédéric Johais =

French racing driver (born 1980)

Frederic Johais
- Fred Johais wins in Magny-Cours, Sept 2017
- Nationality: French
- Born: 15 September 1980 (age 46) Tours, France

2017 GT4 European Series Southern Cup career
- Car number: 9
- Starts: 11
- Wins: 2
- Podiums: 4
- Poles: 3
- Fastest laps: 3

Previous series
- EXR Series; Late model NASCAR Whelen Euro Series; Rotax Max Challenge; FFSA GT Championship; 2001 French Formula Renault 2000; Citroen Saxo Cup; Karting World Championship

Frédéric Michel Henry Johais (born 15 September 1980, in Tours, France) is a French racing driver. He has worked in the Las Vegas-based racing school, Exotics Racing, since 2013.

== Racing career ==
Johais raced in karting from 1991 to 1999, reaching a world-class level in the Karting World Championship in 1999, while he was racing alongside Fernando Alonso, Kimi Räikkönen and Heikki Kovalainen.

== 2000 ==
In 2000, Johais made his start in auto racing through the Citroën Saxo Cup. Despite a crash at the start of his second race in Nogaro, he finished 11th overall (5th in Junior) and was named Rookie of the Year.

In 2001, Frederic competed in the Citroen Saxo Cup and the French Formula Renault 2000 Championship, sharing the car with Patrick Pilet. In the Saxo Cup, he finished third overall after winning one race, and picked up the title in the Junior Category. In Formula Renault, he had a rough season with a small budget and saw his best result in Estoril at the Renault International Finals (15th).

== 2002 ==
In 2002, thanks to Bernard Simmenauer, Johais moved up to the French FFSA GT Championship with the Porsche 996 GT3 RS in the McDonald's Racing Team, alongside Jean Louis Miloe. After finishing in the top-five during the season start, Johais was forced to stop at the middle of the season due to a lack of money. To finish his season, he raced in a go kart, finishing runner up in the French endurance championship and second at Le Mans 24 hours race.

== 2003 ==
In 2003, Johais raced a Porsche 996 GT3 for a Cup alongside Thierry Rabineau for Nourry Competition in the French GT3 Championship, finishing fourth overall with four podiums and two pole positions.

== 2004 - Present ==
In 2004, after losing his main sponsor, Johais reduced his program and started the season in the French Formula France Championship, winning the first event in Nogaro. He later stopped the season despite leading the championship in points. A few months later, Jacky Foulatier invited him to join the Kart Mag Racing Team to finish the season in the go-kart category, finishing 5th at the Le Mans (24 hours) race and third at the ROK Cup World Final in Lonato (Italy).

From 2005 to 2007, Johais went back in go kart in the Rotax Max Euro Challenge finishing seventh overall with two podiums in UK and Austria. During those years, he also won a new title at the Le Mans 24 Hours, and as well as the 24 hours of Bahrain and 24 hours of Essaouira in Morocco. After a break to work on his professional career through FJ Driving Concept, he came back to the auto racing in 2012 through the Racecar Euro Series and won the opening race at Tours Speedway.

Johais then moved to the US and raced in Super Late Model, finishing 5th in Las Vegas in 2013, and in the new EXR Series Championship finishing second in COTA (Austin, Texas) in 2016. In 2015, he also came very close to winning the SKUSA Supernats in Las Vegas, starting from the first row in the final, but he had been pushed in the barriers at the start.

Johais raced in the 2017 GT4 European Series Southern Cup on a BMW M4 for the BMW Team France alongside Julien Piguet, taking back-to-back victories at Magny-Cours in September.
