= Manuela Gostner =

Italian racing driver

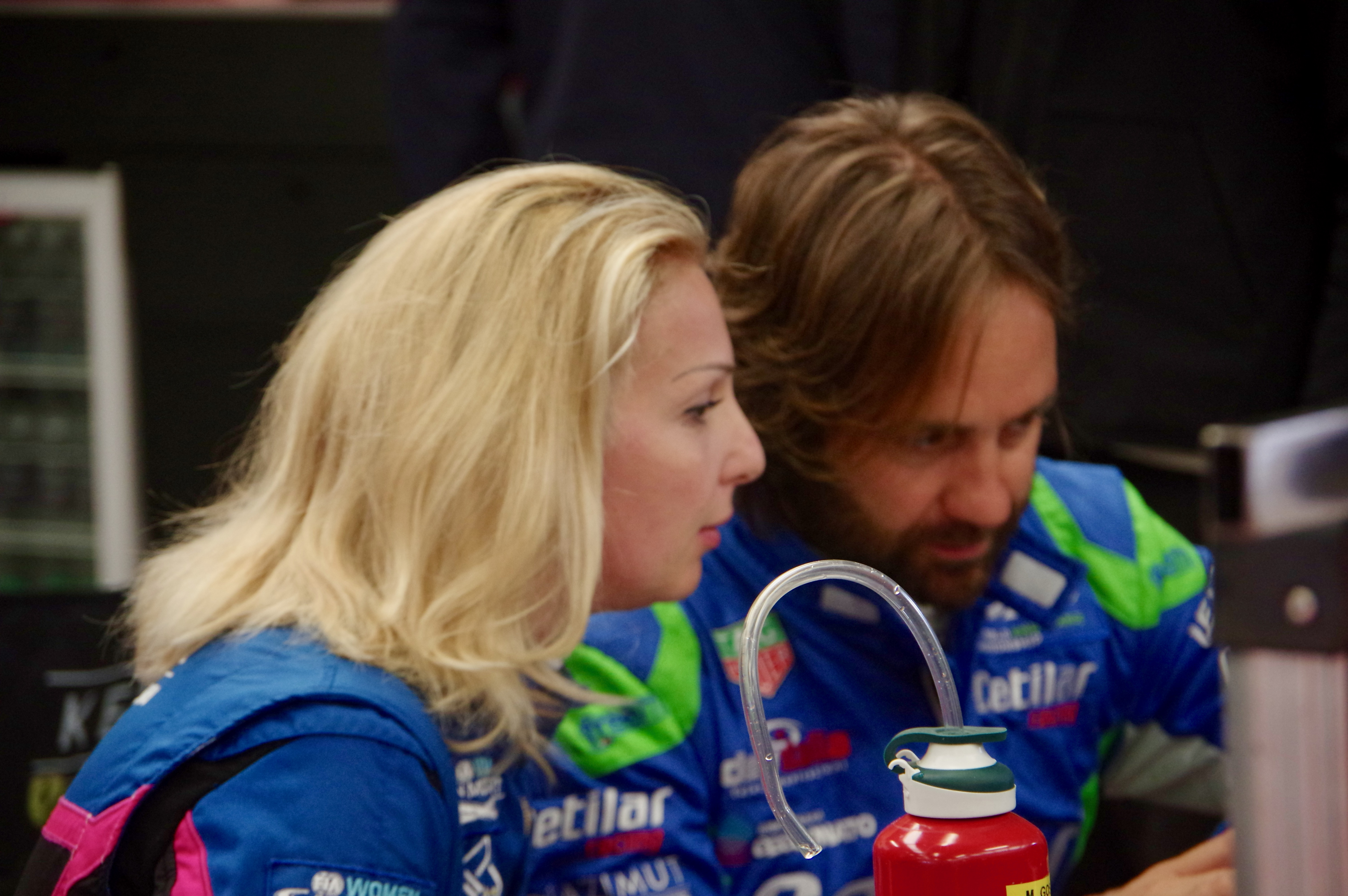
- Gostner (left)
- Nationality: Italian
- Born: 19 May 1984 (age 42) Bolzano, South Tyrol, Italy
- Relatives: Corinna Gostner (sister); David Gostner (brother); Thomas Gostner (father)

European Le Mans Series – GTE
- Categorisation: FIA Bronze
- Years active: 2019–2020
- Teams: Kessel Racing
- Starts: 9
- Wins: 0
- Poles: 0
- Fastest laps: 0
- Best finish: 4th in 2019

Previous series
- 2014–2018 2017: Ferrari Challenge Europe – Coppa Shell; GT4 European Series Northern Cup

Manuela Gostner (born 19 May 1984 in Bolzano) is a racing driver from Italy.

== Biography ==
A member of the Gostner family synonymous with Ferrari Challenge competition, Manuela entered the European championship with encouragement from her brother David at the end of the 2014 season. She became a regular name in the amateur Coppa Shell class over the coming years, winning two races in 2018. Having entered the 2017 GT4 European Series Northern Cup to earn an FIA Bronze Licence, she was picked up by Kessel Racing to make up an all-female entry into the European Le Mans Series, with plans to make the grid for the 24 Hours of Le Mans. The team, consisting of Rahel Frey and Michelle Gatting, finished fourth in the GTE championship with two second places and scored entry into the 2019 24 Hours of Le Mans, finishing ninth in class and 39th overall.

Prior to her motorsport career, Gostner was a professional volleyball player. Manuela Gostner is also a mother.

== Racing record ==
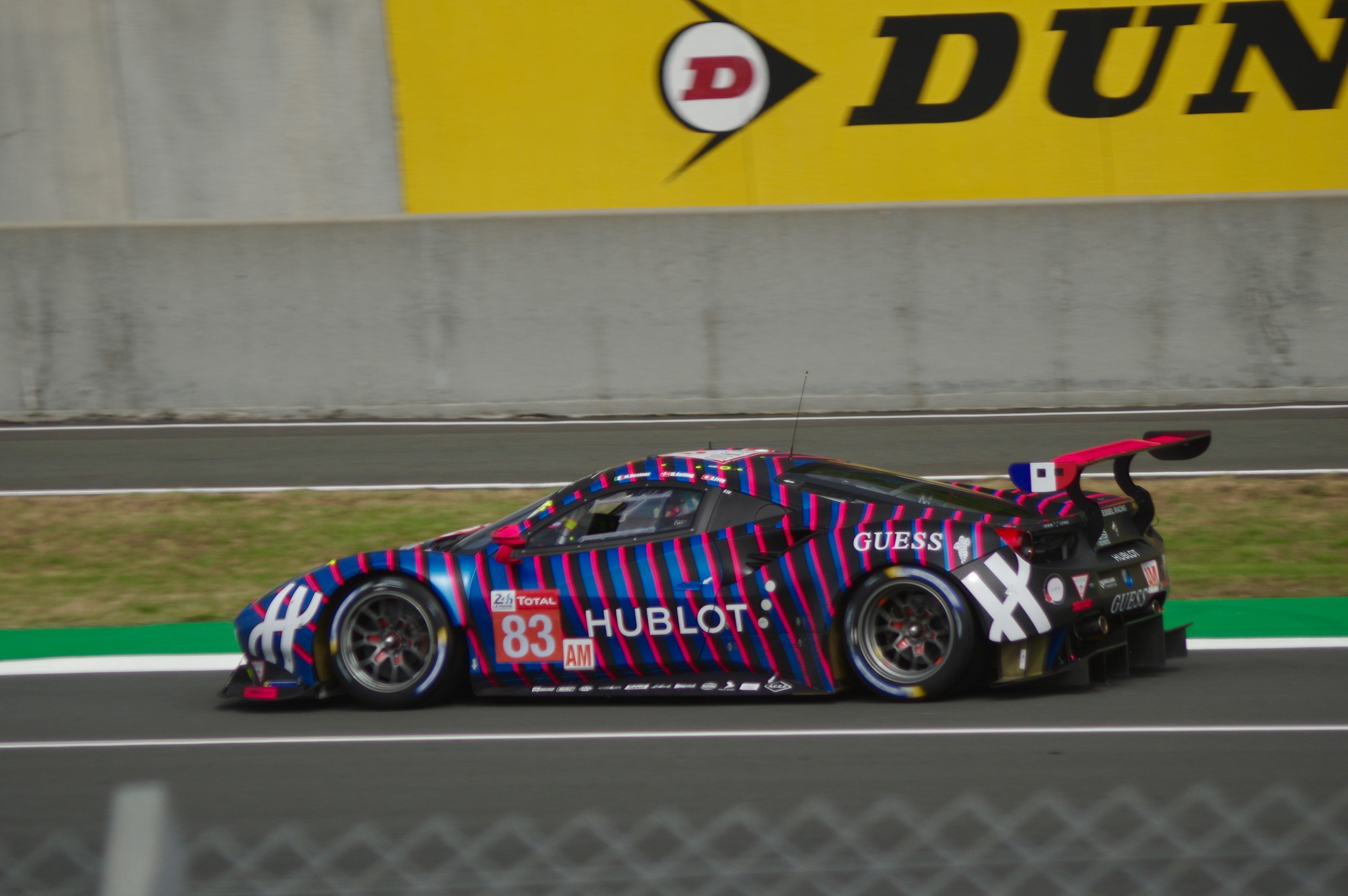
Gostner competing in the 2019 24 Hours of Le Mans.

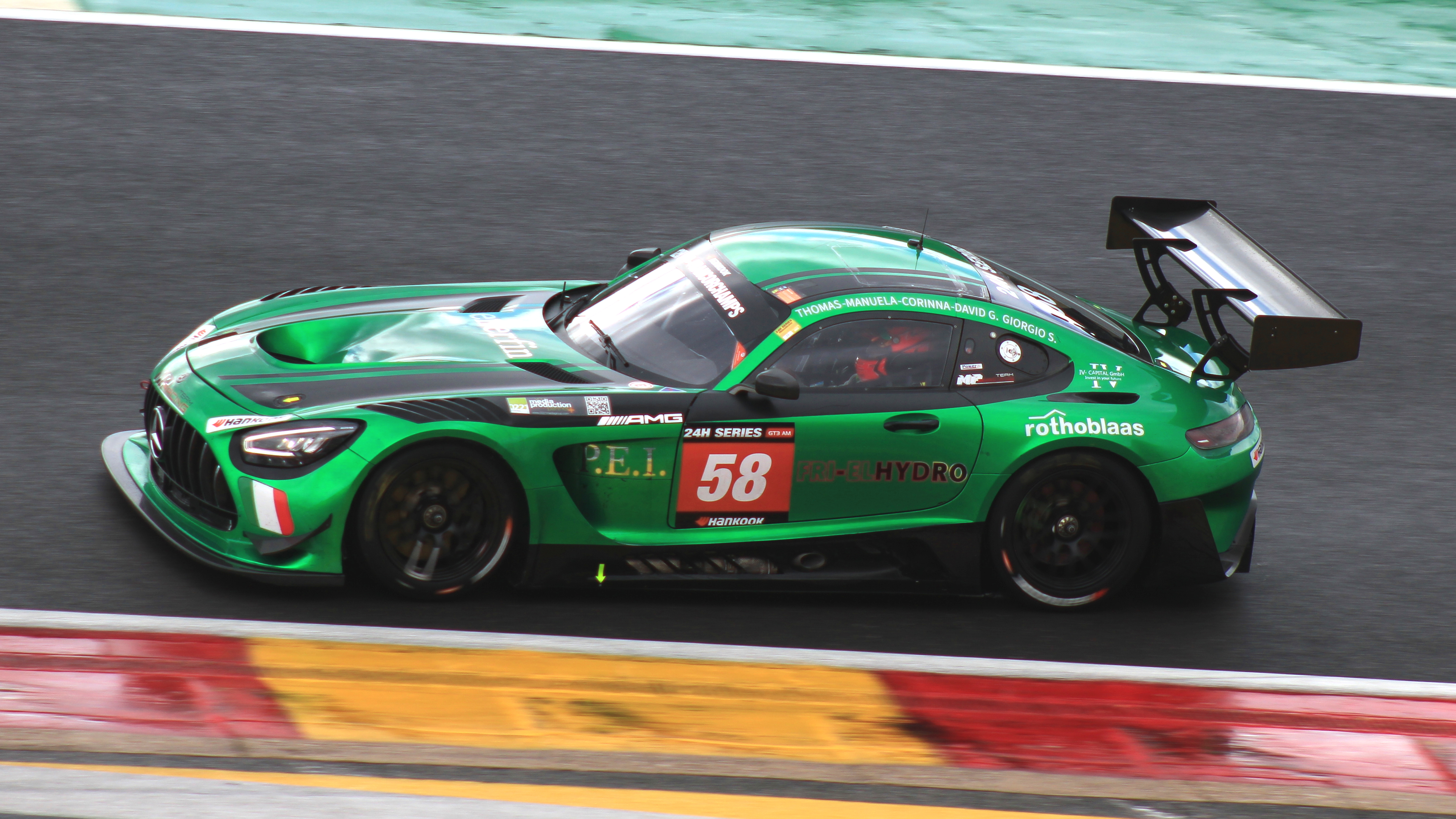
The Gostner family entry competing in the 2023 12 Hours of Spa-Francorchamps.

=== Career summary ===
Season	Series	Team	Races	Wins	Poles	F/Laps	Podiums	Points	Position
2014	Ferrari Challenge Europe - Coppa Shell	Ineco – MP Racing	2	0	0	0	0	2	20th
2014	Ferrari Challenge Finali Mondiali - Coppa Shell	Ineco – MP Racing	1	0	0	0	0	N/A	20th
2015	Ferrari Challenge Europe - Coppa Shell	Ineco – MP Racing	14	0	0	0	0	24	12th
2015	Ferrari Challenge Finali Mondiali - Coppa Shell	Ineco – MP Racing	1	0	0	0	0	N/A	15th
2016	Ferrari Challenge Europe - Coppa Shell	Ineco – MP Racing	11	0	0	0	0	9	21st
2016	Ferrari Challenge Finali Mondiali - Coppa Shell	Ineco – MP Racing	1	0	0	0	0	N/A	DNF
2016	Italian GT Championship - GT Cup	MP Racing	2	0	0	0	0	7	15th
2017	Ferrari Challenge Europe - Coppa Shell	Ineco – MP Racing	12	0	0	0	0	47	11th
2017	Ferrari Challenge Finali Mondiali - Coppa Shell	Ineco – MP Racing	1	0	0	0	0	N/A	6th
2017	GT4 European Series Northern Cup - Am	Scuderia Villorba Corse	12	2	0	0	3	145	3rd
2018	Ferrari Challenge Europe - Coppa Shell Pro-Am	Ineco – MP Racing	14	2	4	0	6	140	3rd
2018	Ferrari Challenge Finali Mondiali - Coppa Shell Pro-Am	Ineco – MP Racing	1	0	0	0	0	N/A	3rd
2018	Le Mans Cup - GT3	Kessel Racing	1	0	0	0	0	12	9th
2019	Ferrari Challenge Europe - Trofeo Pirelli Pro-Am	Ineco – MP Racing	2	0	1	0	0	11	16th
2019	European Le Mans Series - GTE	Kessel Racing	6	0	0	0	2	68	4th
2019	24 Hours of Le Mans - GTE Am	Kessel Racing	1	0	0	0	0	N/A	9th
2020	European Le Mans Series - GTE	Iron Lynx	5	0	0	0	3	61	5th
2020	24 Hours of Le Mans - GTE Am	Iron Lynx	1	0	0	0	0	N/A	9th
2020	24H GT Series - GT3	MP Racing	1	0	0	0	1	14	8th
2021	FIA World Endurance Championship - GTE Am	Iron Lynx	2	0	0	0	0	16	18th
2021	European Le Mans Series - GTE	Iron Lynx	4	0	0	0	0	20	15th
2021	Le Mans Cup - GT3	Iron Lynx	4	0	0	0	3	31	11th
2021	24H GT Series - GT3	MP Racing	1	0	0	0	0		
2022	Ferrari Challenge Europe - Coppa Shell	MP Racing	6	0	0	2	2	55	4th
2022	Ferrari Challenge Finali Mondiali - Coppa Shell Pro-Am	MP Racing	1	0	0	0	0	N/A	DNF
2023	24H GT Series - GT3	MP Racing	3	0	0	0	0	30	9th
2023	Ferrari Challenge Europe - Coppa Shell	CDP	13	3	2	1	6	103	2nd
2024	Ferrari Challenge Europe - Coppa Shell (Silver)	Ineco - Reparto Corse RAM	4	0	1	0	1	66*	3rd*
2024	24H Series - GT3	MP Racing	2	0	0	0	0	18*	11th*
2024	Gulf 12 Hours	MP Racing	1	0	0	0	0	N/A	18th
2025	24H Series - GT3	MP Racing							
2025	Gulf 12 Hours	MP Racing	1	0	0	0	0	N/A	DNF
2026	24H Series - GT3	MP Racing							

=== Ferrari Challenge Finali Mondiali results ===
Year	Class	Team	Car	Circuit	Pos.
2016	Coppa Shell Am	(Italy) Ineco – MP Racing	Ferrari 458 Challenge Evo	(United States) Daytona International Speedway	DNF
2017	Coppa Shell Am	(Italy) Ineco – MP Racing	Ferrari 488 Challenge	(Italy) Mugello Circuit	6th
2018	Coppa Shell Pro-Am	(Italy) Ineco – MP Racing	Ferrari 488 Challenge	(Italy) Autodromo Nazionale di Monza	3rd
2022	Coppa Shell Pro-Am	(Italy) MP Racing	Ferrari 488 Challenge EVO	(Italy) Autodromo di Imola	DNF

=== Complete 24 Hours of Le Mans results ===
Year	Team	Co-Drivers	Car	Class	Laps	Pos.	Class Pos.
2019	(Switzerland) Kessel Racing	(Switzerland) Rahel Frey (Denmark) Michelle Gatting	Ferrari 488 GTE	GTE; Am	330	39th	9th
2020	(Italy) Iron Lynx	(Switzerland) Rahel Frey (Denmark) Michelle Gatting	Ferrari 488 GTE Evo	GTE; Am	332	34th	9th
