= Petru Umbrărescu =

Romanian racing driver (born 1993)

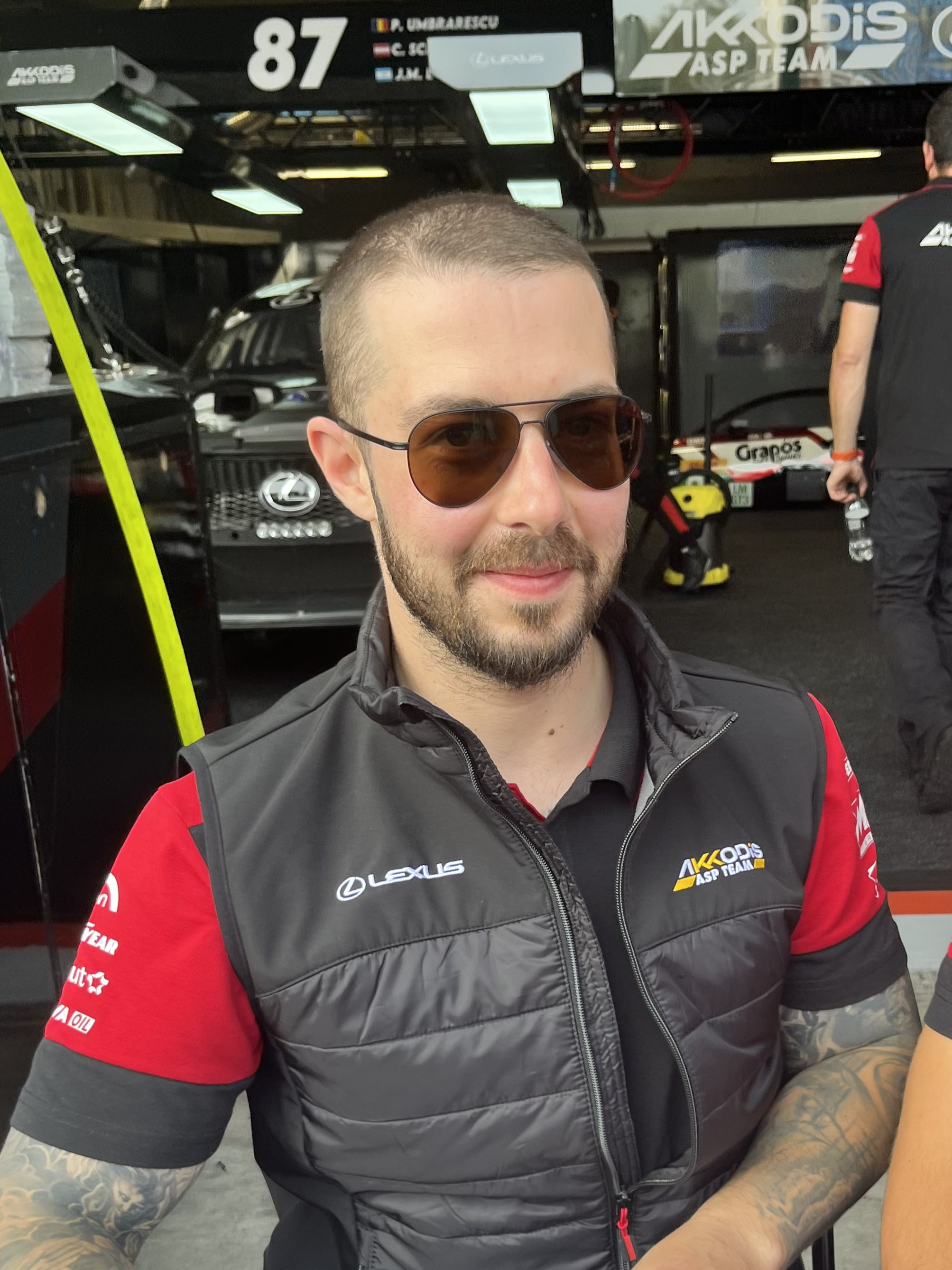
- Umbrărescu at the 2025 6 Hours of São Paulo
- Nationality: (Romania) Romanian
- Born: Petru Răzvan Umbrărescu; 30 June 1993 (age 33) Bacău, Romania

FIA World Endurance Championship career
- Debut season: 2025
- Current team: Akkodis ASP Team
- Categorisation: FIA Silver (until 2024); FIA Bronze (2025–)
- Car number: 87
- Starts: 10 (10 entries)
- Wins: 2
- Podiums: 2
- Poles: 0
- Fastest laps: 0
- Best finish: 1st in 2025

Petru Răzvan Umbrărescu (born 30 June 1993) is a Romanian racing driver who competes in the FIA World Endurance Championship for Akkodis ASP Team.

== Career ==
Umbrărescu started his car racing career in 2016 by competing some races of the Renault Clio Cup for the Certainty Racing Team.

In 2017, Umbrărescu joined the German RN Vision STS team to compete in the GT4 European Series Northern Cup with Gabriele Piana and Hendrik Still as his teammates. He took four class victories and became vice-champion in the Pro-Am classification.

In 2018, Umbrărescu remained with the team to contest the GT4 European Series with Piana as his teammate again. He took his first overall win in the series at the Misano World Circuit. The pair of Piana and Umbrărescu finished the season as seventh in the Silver Cup. That same year, he also joined Leipert Motorsport to compete in a few selected races of the 24H GT Series and Lamborghini Super Trofeo Europe. At the 24 Hours of Portimão, he took second place in the SPX class together with Piana, John-Louis Jasper and Pavel Lefterov.

In 2019, Umbrărescu only competed in the opening round of the International GT Open for Petri Corse with Jules Gounon as his teammate.

In 2020, Umbrărescu joined Team Lazarus to compete in the International GT Open with Stefano Coletti. He only competed in the first two rounds without finishing a single race. He also joined Classic & Modern Racing to compete in the GT World Challenge Europe Endurance Cup with Pierre-Alexandre Jean and Seb Morris. Ahead of the second round at the Nürburgring he was switched to from No. 108 car to the No. 107 car which he shared with Romano Ricci and Stephane Tribaudini.

In 2021, Umbrărescu joined the AKKA ASP Team to compete in the GT World Challenge Europe Sprint Cup with Jules Gounon. After scoring two podiums, the pair finished the season in seventh. He also joined Thomas Drouet, Simon Gachet and Konstantin Tereshchenko as the fourth driver at the 24 Hours of Spa.

In 2022, Umbrărescu remained in the GT World Challenge Europe Sprint Cup with the same team. His teammate was Igor Waliłko. The pair finished the season as tenth in the Silver Cup.

In 2023, Umbrărescu joined the Haupt Racing Team to compete in the ADAC GT Masters. Together with his teammate Arjun Maini he took a second place in the opening round at the Hockenheimring. Ahead of the second round, it was announced that Maximilian Götz would be his teammate for the rest of season. He got three more podiums by the end of the season – two third places at the first race of the fourth and fifth round at the Sachsenring (which he partnered up with Philip Ellis) and the Red Bull Ring – including matching his best finish with a second place in the final race of the final round at the Hockenheimring. Umbrărescu finished the drivers championship in sixth position with one pole position, one fastest lap, four podiums and 142 points.

Umbrărescu's only event of the 2024 season was the 2024 GT World Challenge Europe Sprint Cup, where he entered in two events in the Gold Cup with James Jakes driving for Comtoyou Racing. He only competed in the two races of the third round of the series at the Hockenheimring, where he got his only point. Umbrărescu entered the fifth and final round of the season at the Circuit de Barcelona-Catalunya, but withdrew for health reasons, leaving Jakes to drive the pair of races alone.

=== FIA World Endurance Championship ===
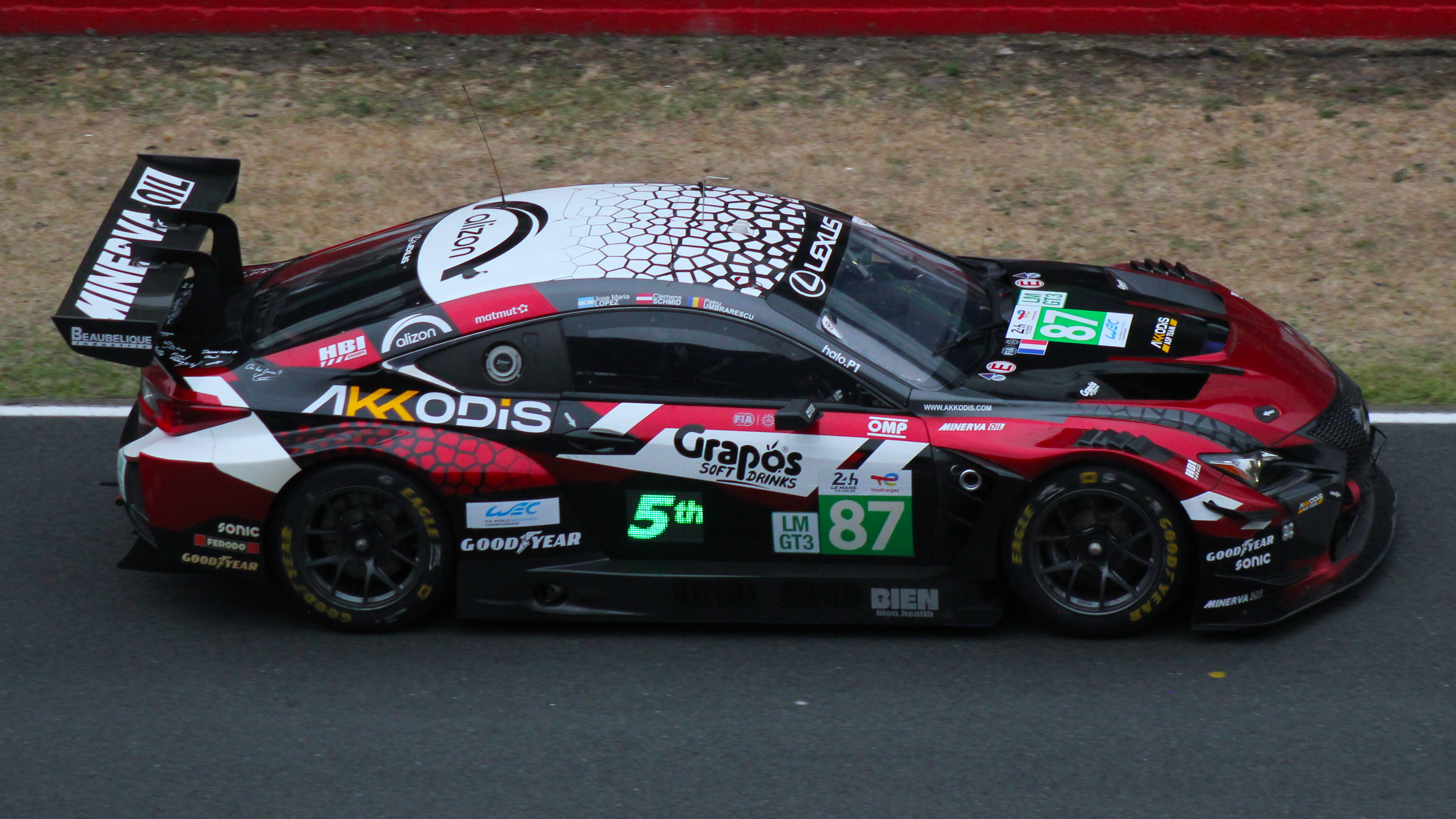
Umbrǎrescu's No. 87 car at the 2025 24 Hours of Le Mans

Umbrărescu became the first Romanian, also the first Balkans, driver to win a race in the FIA World Endurance Championship. He was also the second Romanian to compete in the FIA World Endurance Championship after Filip Ugran, when he was announced for Akkodis ASP Team's lineup in the LMGT3 class of the 2025 FIA World Endurance Championship alongside Clemens Schmid and Finn Gehrsitz. Just before the season, Gehrsitz would migrate to the #87 Akkodis ASP Team instead of the No. 97 one that he was originally a part of and José María López would replace him. Umbrărescu won the fifth round of WEC for the LMGT3 category, at the 2025 6 Hours of São Paulo, marking his debut win. After the victory at Interlagos (Brazil), the season's final race held on the Bahrain International Circuit, Umbrărescu scored his second victory of the season, consolidating his position in the standings. He ended the year in third place in the LMGT3 class, just a fraction behind second place.

== Personal life ==
Umbrărescu was born in Bacău, Romania. He is the son of Dorinel Umbrărescu, who founded the construction company Spedition UMB, of which he is a shareholder.

== Racing record ==
=== Racing career summary ===
Season	Series	Team	Races	Wins	Poles	F/Laps	Podiums	Points	Position
2016	Renault Clio Cup Central Europe	Certainty Racing Team	6	0	0	0	0	36	21st
2016	Renault Clio Cup Italy	Certainty Racing Team	2	0	0	0	0	0	NC
2017	GT4 European Series Northern Cup - Pro-Am	RN Vision STS	10	4	0	0	5	150	2nd
2017	GT4 European Series Northern Cup - Silver	RN Vision STS	2	0	0	0	0	8	32nd
2018	24H GT Series - Championship of the Continents - SPX	Leipert Motorsport	1	0	0	0	1	0	NC
2018	24H GT Series - European Championship - SPX	Leipert Motorsport	1	0	0	0	1	0	NC
2018	Lamborghini Super Trofeo Europe - Am	Leipert Motorsport	2	0	0	0	0	0	NC
2018	GT4 European Series - Silver	RN Vision STS	12	1	1	2	4	98	7th
2019	International GT Open	Petri Corse	1	0	0	0	0	0	39th
2020	International GT Open	Team Lazarus	3	0	0	0	0	0	NC
2020	GT World Challenge Europe Endurance Cup	CMR	2	0	0	0	0	0	NC
2020	GT World Challenge Europe Endurance Cup - Pro-Am	CMR	1	0	0	0	0	4	25th
2021	GT World Challenge Europe Sprint Cup	AKKA ASP Team	10	0	0	0	2	35.5	7th
2021	GT World Challenge Europe Endurance Cup	AKKA ASP Team	1	0	0	0	0	0	NC
2021	GT World Challenge Europe Endurance Cup - Silver	AKKA ASP Team	1	0	0	0	0	6	31st
2022	GT World Challenge Europe Sprint Cup	AKKodis ASP Team	10	0	0	0	0	0	NC
2022	GT World Challenge Europe Sprint Cup - Silver	AKKodis ASP Team	10	0	0	0	0	30.5	10th
2023	ADAC GT Masters	Haupt Racing Team	12	0	1	1	4	142	6th
2024	GT World Challenge Europe Sprint Cup	Comtoyou Racing	2	0	0	0	0	0	NC
2024	GT World Challenge Europe Sprint Cup - Gold	Comtoyou Racing	2	0	0	0	0	4.5	10th
2025	FIA World Endurance Championship - LMGT3	Akkodis ASP Team	8	2	0	0	2	95	**3rd**
2026	FIA World Endurance Championship - LMGT3	Akkodis ASP Team	8	0	0	0	0	38	15th

* Season still in progress.

=== Complete GT4 European Series results ===
(Races in bold indicate pole position) (Races in italics indicate fastest lap)

Year	Team	Car	Class	1	2	3	4	5	6	7	8	9	10	11	12	Pos	Points
2018	RN Vision STS	BMW M4 GT4	Silver	ZOL; 1; 19	ZOL; 2; 21	BRH; 1; 32	BRH; 2; 10	MIS; 1; 1	MIS; 2; 2	SPA; 1; 8	SPA; 2; 10	**HUN**; **1**; 2	HUN; 2; 2	NÜR; 1; 10	NÜR; 2; 9	7th	98

=== Complete GT World Challenge Europe results ===
==== GT World Challenge Europe Endurance Cup ====
(Races in bold indicate pole position) (Races in italics indicate fastest lap)

Year	Team	Car	Class	1	2	3	4	5	6	7	Pos.	Points
2020	CMR	Bentley Continental GT3	Pro	IMO; 37							NC	0
2020	CMR	Bentley Continental GT3	Pro-Am		NÜR; 29	SPA; 6H	SPA; 12H	SPA; 24H	LEC		25th	4
2021	AKKA ASP Team	Mercedes-AMG GT3 Evo	Silver	MNZ	LEC	SPA; 6H; 40	SPA; 12H; 34	SPA; 24H; 23	NÜR	CAT	31st	6

==== GT World Challenge Europe Sprint Cup ====
(Races in bold indicate pole position) (Races in italics indicate fastest lap)

Year	Team	Car	Class	1	2	3	4	5	6	7	8	9	10	Pos.	Points
2021	AKKA ASP Team	Mercedes-AMG GT3 Evo	Pro	MAG; 1; 10	MAG; 2; 24	ZAN; 1; 13	ZAN; 2; 6	MIS; 1; 12	MIS; 2; 7	BRH; 1; 12	BRH; 2; 3	VAL; 1; 5	VAL; 2; 2	7th	35.5
2022	AKKodis ASP Team	Mercedes-AMG GT3 Evo	Silver	BRH; 1; 20	BRH; 2; 15	MAG; 1; 17	MAG; 2; 19	ZAN; 1; 21	ZAN; 2; 12	MIS; 1; 15	MIS; 2; 22	VAL; 1 Ret	VAL; 2; 18	10th	30.5
2024	Comtoyou Racing	Aston Martin Vantage AMR GT3 Evo	Gold	BRH; 1	BRH; 2	MIS; 1	MIS; 2	HOC; 1; 28	HOC; 2 Ret	MAG; 1	MAG; 2	CAT; 1 WD	CAT; 2 WD	10th	4.5

=== Complete ADAC GT Masters results ===
(Races in bold indicate pole position) (Races in italics indicate fastest lap)

Year	Team	Car	1	2	3	4	5	6	7	8	9	10	11	12	DC	Points
2023	Haupt Racing Team	Mercedes-AMG GT3 Evo	HOC; 1; 6	**HOC**; **2**; 2^{1}	NOR; 1; 6	NOR; 2; 7	NÜR; 1; 12	NÜR; 2; 12	SAC; 1; 3	SAC; 2; 6^{2}	RBR; 1; 6	RBR; 2; 3	HOC; 1; 8	HOC; 2; 2	4th	142

=== Complete FIA World Endurance Championship results ===
(Races in bold indicate pole position) (Races in italics indicate fastest lap)

Year	Entrant	Class	Chassis	Engine	1	2	3	4	5	6	7	8	Rank	Points
2025	Akkodis ASP Team	LMGT3	Lexus RC F GT3	Lexus 2UR-GSE 5.0 L V8	QAT; Ret	IMO; 4	SPA; Ret	LMS; 5	SÃO; 1	COA; NC	FUJ; 15	BHR; 1	3rd	95
2026	Akkodis ASP Team	LMGT3	Lexus RC F GT3	Lexus 2UR-GSE 5.0 L V8	IMO; Ret	SPA; 6	LMS; 4	SÃO; 7	COA; 13	FUJ; 11	CAT; 15	MNZ; Ret	15th	38

=== Complete 24 Hours of Le Mans results ===
Year	Team	Co-Drivers	Car	Class	Laps	Pos.	Class Pos.
2025	(France) Akkodis ASP Team	(Argentina) José María López (Austria) Clemens Schmid	Lexus RC F GT3	LMGT3	340	37th	5th
2026	(France) Akkodis ASP Team	(Argentina) José María López (Austria) Clemens Schmid	Lexus RC F GT3	LMGT3	335	36th	4th
