= 2017 GT4 European Series Northern Cup =

The 2017 GT4 European Series Northern Cup was the tenth season of the GT4 European Series Northern Cup, a sports car championship created and organised by the Stéphane Ratel Organisation (SRO). It was the first season after it was renamed from GT4 European Series to GT4 European Series Northern Cup.

== Calendar ==
At the annual press conference during the 2016 24 Hours of Spa on 29 July, the Stéphane Ratel Organisation announced the first draft of the 2017 calendar. The final calendar was announced on 23 December. The series started at Misano on 1 April and ended at the Nürburgring on 17 September. Misano and the Nürburgring made their return on the schedule after a one-year absence, while Brands Hatch was on the schedule for the first time in the series' history. The rounds at Monza and Silverstone were discontinued and the round in Pau would be part of the Southern Cup.

Round	Circuit	Date	Supporting
1	Misano World Circuit Marco Simoncelli, Misano Adriatico, Italy	1–2 April	Blancpain GT Series Sprint Cup
2	(United Kingdom) Brands Hatch, Kent, Great Britain	6–7 May	Blancpain GT Series Sprint Cup
3	Red Bull Ring, Spielberg, Austria	10–11 June	ADAC GT Masters
4	Automotodróm Slovakia Ring, Orechová Potôň, Slovakia	15–16 July	European Truck Racing Championship
5	Circuit Park Zandvoort, Zandvoort, Netherlands	19–20 August	Deutsche Tourenwagen Masters
6	Nürburgring, Nürburg, Germany	16–17 September	Blancpain GT Series Sprint Cup

== Entry list ==
Starting from the third round at the Red Bull Ring, the series decided to introduce a Silver Cup category, splitting Silver-Silver pairings from the Pro (now Pro-Am) category. This was done with retroactive character to apply for the already held rounds in Misano and Brands Hatch, with fully revised results and standings released.

Team	Car	No.	Drivers	Class	Rounds
(Germany) PROsport Performance	Porsche Cayman GT4 Clubsport MR	1	(Germany) Jörg Viebahn	PA	2
(Germany) PROsport Performance	Porsche Cayman GT4 Clubsport MR	1	(Denmark) Nicolaj Møller Madsen	PA	2
(Germany) PROsport Performance	Porsche Cayman PRO4 GT4	3	(Denmark) Kevin Rossel	PA	2
(Germany) PROsport Performance	Porsche Cayman PRO4 GT4	3	(Italy) Alessandro Giovanelli	PA	2
(Germany) PROsport Performance	Porsche Cayman PRO4 GT4	3	(Germany) Carsten Struwe	Am	3, 6
(Germany) PROsport Performance	Porsche Cayman PRO4 GT4	3	(Germany) Philip Hamprecht	Am	3
(Germany) PROsport Performance	Porsche Cayman PRO4 GT4	3	(Germany) Dieter Schmidtmann	Am	6
(Germany) PROsport Performance	Porsche Cayman PRO4 GT4	91	(Denmark) Nicolaj Møller Madsen	PA	1
(Germany) PROsport Performance	Porsche Cayman PRO4 GT4	91	(Germany) Jörg Viebahn	PA	1
(Germany) PROsport Performance	Porsche Cayman GT4 Clubsport	92	(Belgium) Alessio Picariello	S	1
(Germany) PROsport Performance	Porsche Cayman GT4 Clubsport	92	(Denmark) Kevin Rossel	S	1
(Germany) PROsport Performance	Porsche Cayman GT4 Clubsport	94	(Italy) Alessandro Giovanelli	Am	1
(Germany) PROsport Performance	Porsche Cayman GT4 Clubsport	94	(Germany) Carsten Struwe	Am	1
(Germany) PROsport Performance	Porsche Cayman GT4 Clubsport	994	(Germany) Freddy Kremer	Am	3
(Germany) PROsport Performance	Porsche Cayman GT4 Clubsport	994	(Germany) Detlef Schmidt	Am	3
(Germany) PROsport Performance	Porsche Cayman PRO4 GT4	994	(Germany) Marek Böckmann	S	6
(Germany) PROsport Performance	Porsche Cayman PRO4 GT4	994	(Denmark) Nicolaj Møller Madsen	S	6
(France) Energy by ART	Porsche Cayman GT4 Clubsport MR	4	(France) Grégoire Demoustier	PA	2, 5–6
(France) Energy by ART	Porsche Cayman GT4 Clubsport MR	4	(France) Alain Ferté	PA	2, 5–6
(Belgium) Street Art Racing	Aston Martin V8 Vantage GT4	7	(France) Jérôme Demay	S	All
(Belgium) Street Art Racing	Aston Martin V8 Vantage GT4	7	(Belgium) Denis Dupont	S	1–3
(Belgium) Street Art Racing	Aston Martin V8 Vantage GT4	7	(France) Julien Darras	S	4, 6
(Belgium) Street Art Racing	Aston Martin V8 Vantage GT4	7	(Monaco) Micah Stanley	S	5
(Netherlands) Ekris Motorsport	Ekris M4 GT4	8	(Netherlands) Ricardo van der Ende	S	All
(Netherlands) Ekris Motorsport	Ekris M4 GT4	8	(Netherlands) Max Koebolt	S	All
(Netherlands) / Las Moras Racing (Note: Car No. 9 entered as Las Moras Racing and car No. 10 entered as Equipe Verschuur.); (Netherlands) / Equipe Verschuur	McLaren 570S GT4	9	(Netherlands) Luc Braams	PA	All
(Netherlands) / Las Moras Racing; (Netherlands) / Equipe Verschuur	McLaren 570S GT4	9	(Netherlands) Duncan Huisman	PA	All
(Netherlands) / Las Moras Racing; (Netherlands) / Equipe Verschuur	McLaren 570S GT4	10	(Hungary) Csaba Mór	S	All
(Netherlands) / Las Moras Racing; (Netherlands) / Equipe Verschuur	McLaren 570S GT4	10	(United Kingdom) Finlay Hutchison	S	1, 3–6
(Netherlands) / Las Moras Racing; (Netherlands) / Equipe Verschuur	McLaren 570S GT4	10	(United Kingdom) Matthew Graham	S	2
(Bulgaria) / Sofia Car Motorsport by BADI (Note: Car No. 11 entered as Sofia Car Motorsport by BADI from Round 1 to 3, but as Sofia Car Motorsport from Round 4 on.); (Bulgaria) / Sofia Car Motorsport	SIN R1 GT4	11	(Romania) Eduard Anton	Am	1–3
(Bulgaria) / Sofia Car Motorsport by BADI; (Bulgaria) / Sofia Car Motorsport	SIN R1 GT4	11	(Romania) Bianca Anton	Am	1–2
(Bulgaria) / Sofia Car Motorsport by BADI; (Bulgaria) / Sofia Car Motorsport	SIN R1 GT4	11	(Bulgaria) Ivan Vlachkov	Am	4–6
(Germany) Schwede Motorsport	Porsche Cayman GT4 Clubsport MR	13	(Germany) Marc Basseng	PA	6
(Germany) Schwede Motorsport	Porsche Cayman GT4 Clubsport MR	13	(Germany) Phillip Bethke	PA	6
(Germany) Schwede Motorsport	Porsche Cayman GT4 Clubsport MR	15	(Germany) Dominik Schraml	PA	6
(Germany) Schwede Motorsport	Porsche Cayman GT4 Clubsport MR	15	(Germany) Rudolf Schulte	PA	6
(Germany) / RYS Team KTM (Note: Car No. 14 entered as RYS Team KTM, car No. 24 entered as RYS Team Holinger, car No. 34 entered as RYS Team KISKA, car No. 44 entered as RYS Team WP, car No. 54 entered as RYS Team Pankl, car No. 64 entered as RYS Team InterNetX, car No. 74 entered as RYS Team True Racing, car No. 84 entered as Reiter Engineering, the Am entry of car No. 94 entered as RYS Team Schönramer / Racecom and the Silver Cup entry of car No. 94 entered as RYS Team Schönramer / Neptun / Racecom.); (Germany) / RYS Team Holinger; (Germany) / RYS Team KISKA; (Germany) / RYS Team WP; (Germany) / RYS Team Pankl; (Germany) / RYS Team InterNetX; (Germany) / RYS Team True Racing; (Germany) / Reiter Engineering; (Germany) / RYS Team Schönramer / Racecom; (Germany) / RYS Team Schönramer / Neptun / Racecom	KTM X-Bow GT4	14	(Austria) Eike Angermayr	S	1, 3–6
(Germany) / RYS Team KTM; (Germany) / RYS Team Holinger; (Germany) / RYS Team KISKA; (Germany) / RYS Team WP; (Germany) / RYS Team Pankl; (Germany) / RYS Team InterNetX; (Germany) / RYS Team True Racing; (Germany) / Reiter Engineering; (Germany) / RYS Team Schönramer / Racecom; (Germany) / RYS Team Schönramer / Neptun / Racecom	KTM X-Bow GT4	14	(Austria) Reinhard Kofler	S	1, 3–6
(Germany) / RYS Team KTM; (Germany) / RYS Team Holinger; (Germany) / RYS Team KISKA; (Germany) / RYS Team WP; (Germany) / RYS Team Pankl; (Germany) / RYS Team InterNetX; (Germany) / RYS Team True Racing; (Germany) / Reiter Engineering; (Germany) / RYS Team Schönramer / Racecom; (Germany) / RYS Team Schönramer / Neptun / Racecom	KTM X-Bow GT4	24	(Slovakia) Samuel Sládečka	S	1, 3–6
(Germany) / RYS Team KTM; (Germany) / RYS Team Holinger; (Germany) / RYS Team KISKA; (Germany) / RYS Team WP; (Germany) / RYS Team Pankl; (Germany) / RYS Team InterNetX; (Germany) / RYS Team True Racing; (Germany) / Reiter Engineering; (Germany) / RYS Team Schönramer / Racecom; (Germany) / RYS Team Schönramer / Neptun / Racecom	KTM X-Bow GT4	24	(Finland) Emil Westman	S	1, 3–6
(Germany) / RYS Team KTM; (Germany) / RYS Team Holinger; (Germany) / RYS Team KISKA; (Germany) / RYS Team WP; (Germany) / RYS Team Pankl; (Germany) / RYS Team InterNetX; (Germany) / RYS Team True Racing; (Germany) / Reiter Engineering; (Germany) / RYS Team Schönramer / Racecom; (Germany) / RYS Team Schönramer / Neptun / Racecom	KTM X-Bow GT4	34	(Germany) Lennart Marioneck	S	1, 3, 5–6
(Germany) / RYS Team KTM; (Germany) / RYS Team Holinger; (Germany) / RYS Team KISKA; (Germany) / RYS Team WP; (Germany) / RYS Team Pankl; (Germany) / RYS Team InterNetX; (Germany) / RYS Team True Racing; (Germany) / Reiter Engineering; (Germany) / RYS Team Schönramer / Racecom; (Germany) / RYS Team Schönramer / Neptun / Racecom	KTM X-Bow GT4	34	(Venezuela) Jonathan Cecotto	S	1
(Germany) / RYS Team KTM; (Germany) / RYS Team Holinger; (Germany) / RYS Team KISKA; (Germany) / RYS Team WP; (Germany) / RYS Team Pankl; (Germany) / RYS Team InterNetX; (Germany) / RYS Team True Racing; (Germany) / Reiter Engineering; (Germany) / RYS Team Schönramer / Racecom; (Germany) / RYS Team Schönramer / Neptun / Racecom	KTM X-Bow GT4	34	(Austria) Gottfried Pilz	S	3
(Germany) / RYS Team KTM; (Germany) / RYS Team Holinger; (Germany) / RYS Team KISKA; (Germany) / RYS Team WP; (Germany) / RYS Team Pankl; (Germany) / RYS Team InterNetX; (Germany) / RYS Team True Racing; (Germany) / Reiter Engineering; (Germany) / RYS Team Schönramer / Racecom; (Germany) / RYS Team Schönramer / Neptun / Racecom	KTM X-Bow GT4	34	(Czech Republic) Erik Janiš	S	4
(Germany) / RYS Team KTM; (Germany) / RYS Team Holinger; (Germany) / RYS Team KISKA; (Germany) / RYS Team WP; (Germany) / RYS Team Pankl; (Germany) / RYS Team InterNetX; (Germany) / RYS Team True Racing; (Germany) / Reiter Engineering; (Germany) / RYS Team Schönramer / Racecom; (Germany) / RYS Team Schönramer / Neptun / Racecom	KTM X-Bow GT4	34	(Czech Republic) Josef Záruba	S	4
(Germany) / RYS Team KTM; (Germany) / RYS Team Holinger; (Germany) / RYS Team KISKA; (Germany) / RYS Team WP; (Germany) / RYS Team Pankl; (Germany) / RYS Team InterNetX; (Germany) / RYS Team True Racing; (Germany) / Reiter Engineering; (Germany) / RYS Team Schönramer / Racecom; (Germany) / RYS Team Schönramer / Neptun / Racecom	KTM X-Bow GT4	34	(Netherlands) Willem Meijer	S	5–6
(Germany) / RYS Team KTM; (Germany) / RYS Team Holinger; (Germany) / RYS Team KISKA; (Germany) / RYS Team WP; (Germany) / RYS Team Pankl; (Germany) / RYS Team InterNetX; (Germany) / RYS Team True Racing; (Germany) / Reiter Engineering; (Germany) / RYS Team Schönramer / Racecom; (Germany) / RYS Team Schönramer / Neptun / Racecom	KTM X-Bow GT4	44	(Switzerland) Marylin Niederhauser	S	1, 3–6
(Germany) / RYS Team KTM; (Germany) / RYS Team Holinger; (Germany) / RYS Team KISKA; (Germany) / RYS Team WP; (Germany) / RYS Team Pankl; (Germany) / RYS Team InterNetX; (Germany) / RYS Team True Racing; (Germany) / Reiter Engineering; (Germany) / RYS Team Schönramer / Racecom; (Germany) / RYS Team Schönramer / Neptun / Racecom	KTM X-Bow GT4	44	(South Africa) Naomi Schiff	S	1, 3–4, 6
(Germany) / RYS Team KTM; (Germany) / RYS Team Holinger; (Germany) / RYS Team KISKA; (Germany) / RYS Team WP; (Germany) / RYS Team Pankl; (Germany) / RYS Team InterNetX; (Germany) / RYS Team True Racing; (Germany) / Reiter Engineering; (Germany) / RYS Team Schönramer / Racecom; (Germany) / RYS Team Schönramer / Neptun / Racecom	KTM X-Bow GT4	44	(Australia) Caitlin Wood	S	5
(Germany) / RYS Team KTM; (Germany) / RYS Team Holinger; (Germany) / RYS Team KISKA; (Germany) / RYS Team WP; (Germany) / RYS Team Pankl; (Germany) / RYS Team InterNetX; (Germany) / RYS Team True Racing; (Germany) / Reiter Engineering; (Germany) / RYS Team Schönramer / Racecom; (Germany) / RYS Team Schönramer / Neptun / Racecom	KTM X-Bow GT4	54	(Germany) Benjamin Mazatis	S (Note: August Macbeth and Benjamin Mazatis scored Silver Cup class points at Round 4, but from Round 5 on they scored Pro-Am class points, after Macbeth was demoted from the silver to the bronze driver categorisation.)	1, 3–6
(Germany) / RYS Team KTM; (Germany) / RYS Team Holinger; (Germany) / RYS Team KISKA; (Germany) / RYS Team WP; (Germany) / RYS Team Pankl; (Germany) / RYS Team InterNetX; (Germany) / RYS Team True Racing; (Germany) / Reiter Engineering; (Germany) / RYS Team Schönramer / Racecom; (Germany) / RYS Team Schönramer / Neptun / Racecom	KTM X-Bow GT4	54	(United States) Brett Sandberg	S	1
(Germany) / RYS Team KTM; (Germany) / RYS Team Holinger; (Germany) / RYS Team KISKA; (Germany) / RYS Team WP; (Germany) / RYS Team Pankl; (Germany) / RYS Team InterNetX; (Germany) / RYS Team True Racing; (Germany) / Reiter Engineering; (Germany) / RYS Team Schönramer / Racecom; (Germany) / RYS Team Schönramer / Neptun / Racecom	KTM X-Bow GT4	54	(Germany) Arne Hoffmeister	S	3
(Germany) / RYS Team KTM; (Germany) / RYS Team Holinger; (Germany) / RYS Team KISKA; (Germany) / RYS Team WP; (Germany) / RYS Team Pankl; (Germany) / RYS Team InterNetX; (Germany) / RYS Team True Racing; (Germany) / Reiter Engineering; (Germany) / RYS Team Schönramer / Racecom; (Germany) / RYS Team Schönramer / Neptun / Racecom	KTM X-Bow GT4	54	(United States) August Macbeth	S	4–6
(Germany) / RYS Team KTM; (Germany) / RYS Team Holinger; (Germany) / RYS Team KISKA; (Germany) / RYS Team WP; (Germany) / RYS Team Pankl; (Germany) / RYS Team InterNetX; (Germany) / RYS Team True Racing; (Germany) / Reiter Engineering; (Germany) / RYS Team Schönramer / Racecom; (Germany) / RYS Team Schönramer / Neptun / Racecom	KTM X-Bow GT4	64	(Norway) Mads Siljehaug	S	1, 3–6
(Germany) / RYS Team KTM; (Germany) / RYS Team Holinger; (Germany) / RYS Team KISKA; (Germany) / RYS Team WP; (Germany) / RYS Team Pankl; (Germany) / RYS Team InterNetX; (Germany) / RYS Team True Racing; (Germany) / Reiter Engineering; (Germany) / RYS Team Schönramer / Racecom; (Germany) / RYS Team Schönramer / Neptun / Racecom	KTM X-Bow GT4	64	(Belgium) Jamie Vandenbalck	S	1, 3–6
(Germany) / RYS Team KTM; (Germany) / RYS Team Holinger; (Germany) / RYS Team KISKA; (Germany) / RYS Team WP; (Germany) / RYS Team Pankl; (Germany) / RYS Team InterNetX; (Germany) / RYS Team True Racing; (Germany) / Reiter Engineering; (Germany) / RYS Team Schönramer / Racecom; (Germany) / RYS Team Schönramer / Neptun / Racecom	KTM X-Bow GT4	74	(Switzerland) Cédric Freiburghaus	S	All
(Germany) / RYS Team KTM; (Germany) / RYS Team Holinger; (Germany) / RYS Team KISKA; (Germany) / RYS Team WP; (Germany) / RYS Team Pankl; (Germany) / RYS Team InterNetX; (Germany) / RYS Team True Racing; (Germany) / Reiter Engineering; (Germany) / RYS Team Schönramer / Racecom; (Germany) / RYS Team Schönramer / Neptun / Racecom	KTM X-Bow GT4	74	(Austria) Laura Kraihamer	S	1, 3–6
(Germany) / RYS Team KTM; (Germany) / RYS Team Holinger; (Germany) / RYS Team KISKA; (Germany) / RYS Team WP; (Germany) / RYS Team Pankl; (Germany) / RYS Team InterNetX; (Germany) / RYS Team True Racing; (Germany) / Reiter Engineering; (Germany) / RYS Team Schönramer / Racecom; (Germany) / RYS Team Schönramer / Neptun / Racecom	KTM X-Bow GT4	74	(Norway) Mads Siljehaug	S	2
(Germany) / RYS Team KTM; (Germany) / RYS Team Holinger; (Germany) / RYS Team KISKA; (Germany) / RYS Team WP; (Germany) / RYS Team Pankl; (Germany) / RYS Team InterNetX; (Germany) / RYS Team True Racing; (Germany) / Reiter Engineering; (Germany) / RYS Team Schönramer / Racecom; (Germany) / RYS Team Schönramer / Neptun / Racecom	KTM X-Bow GT4	84	(Germany) Arne Hoffmeister	S	1
(Germany) / RYS Team KTM; (Germany) / RYS Team Holinger; (Germany) / RYS Team KISKA; (Germany) / RYS Team WP; (Germany) / RYS Team Pankl; (Germany) / RYS Team InterNetX; (Germany) / RYS Team True Racing; (Germany) / Reiter Engineering; (Germany) / RYS Team Schönramer / Racecom; (Germany) / RYS Team Schönramer / Neptun / Racecom	KTM X-Bow GT4	84	(Netherlands) Stéphane Kox	S	1
(Germany) / RYS Team KTM; (Germany) / RYS Team Holinger; (Germany) / RYS Team KISKA; (Germany) / RYS Team WP; (Germany) / RYS Team Pankl; (Germany) / RYS Team InterNetX; (Germany) / RYS Team True Racing; (Germany) / Reiter Engineering; (Germany) / RYS Team Schönramer / Racecom; (Germany) / RYS Team Schönramer / Neptun / Racecom	KTM X-Bow GT4	94	(Austria) Achim Mörtl	Am	3–5
(Germany) / RYS Team KTM; (Germany) / RYS Team Holinger; (Germany) / RYS Team KISKA; (Germany) / RYS Team WP; (Germany) / RYS Team Pankl; (Germany) / RYS Team InterNetX; (Germany) / RYS Team True Racing; (Germany) / Reiter Engineering; (Germany) / RYS Team Schönramer / Racecom; (Germany) / RYS Team Schönramer / Neptun / Racecom	KTM X-Bow GT4	94	(Romania) Eduard Anton	Am	4–5
(Germany) / RYS Team KTM; (Germany) / RYS Team Holinger; (Germany) / RYS Team KISKA; (Germany) / RYS Team WP; (Germany) / RYS Team Pankl; (Germany) / RYS Team InterNetX; (Germany) / RYS Team True Racing; (Germany) / Reiter Engineering; (Germany) / RYS Team Schönramer / Racecom; (Germany) / RYS Team Schönramer / Neptun / Racecom	KTM X-Bow GT4	94	(Finland) Henri Kauppi	S	6
(Germany) / RYS Team KTM; (Germany) / RYS Team Holinger; (Germany) / RYS Team KISKA; (Germany) / RYS Team WP; (Germany) / RYS Team Pankl; (Germany) / RYS Team InterNetX; (Germany) / RYS Team True Racing; (Germany) / Reiter Engineering; (Germany) / RYS Team Schönramer / Racecom; (Germany) / RYS Team Schönramer / Neptun / Racecom	KTM X-Bow GT4	94	(Switzerland) Nikolaj Rogivue	S	6
(Luxembourg) MOMO-Megatron Team Partrax	Porsche Cayman GT4 Clubsport MR	16	(Germany) Bernhard Laber	PA	5–6
(Luxembourg) MOMO-Megatron Team Partrax	Porsche Cayman GT4 Clubsport MR	16	(Germany) Christian Danner	PA	5
(Luxembourg) MOMO-Megatron Team Partrax	Porsche Cayman GT4 Clubsport MR	16	(Switzerland) Nico Rindlisbacher	PA	6
(Germany) Besagroup Racing Team	Porsche Cayman GT4 Clubsport MR	20	(Croatia) Franjo Kovac	Am	2–6
(Germany) Besagroup Racing Team	Porsche Cayman GT4 Clubsport MR	20	(Germany) Cora Schumacher	Am	2–4, 6
(Germany) Allied-Racing	Porsche Cayman GT4 Clubsport MR	21	(Belgium) Sam Dejonghe	S	2
(Germany) Allied-Racing	Porsche Cayman GT4 Clubsport MR	21	(Belgium) Jamie Vandenbalck	S	2
(Germany) Allied-Racing	Porsche Cayman GT4 Clubsport MR	21	(Germany) Joachim Bölting	Am	4, 6
(Germany) Allied-Racing	Porsche Cayman GT4 Clubsport MR	21	(Germany) Niki Schelle	Am	4, 6
(Germany) Allied-Racing	Porsche Cayman GT4 Clubsport MR	22	(Germany) Jan Kasperlik	PA	All
(Germany) Allied-Racing	Porsche Cayman GT4 Clubsport MR	22	(Germany) Tim Stupple	PA	1–4
(Germany) Allied-Racing	Porsche Cayman GT4 Clubsport MR	22	(Germany) Jörg Viebahn	PA	5–6
(Germany) Allied-Racing	Porsche Cayman GT4 Clubsport MR	28	(Germany) Freddy Kremer	Am	5–6
(Germany) Allied-Racing	Porsche Cayman GT4 Clubsport MR	28	(Germany) Detlef Schmidt	Am	5–6
(United Kingdom) Sean Walkinshaw Racing	Nissan 370Z GT4	23	(France) Romain Sarazin	S	1–2
(United Kingdom) Sean Walkinshaw Racing	Nissan 370Z GT4	23	(United Kingdom) Charlie Fagg	S	1–2
(United Kingdom) Sean Walkinshaw Racing	Nissan 370Z GT4	23	(United Kingdom) Charlie Fagg	PA	3
(United Kingdom) Sean Walkinshaw Racing	Nissan 370Z GT4	23	(Monaco) Micah Stanley	PA	3
(France) CMR	Ginetta G55 GT4	26	(France) Soheil Ayari	PA	2, 5
(France) CMR	Ginetta G55 GT4	26	(France) Nyls Stievenart	PA	2, 5
(France) CMR	Ginetta G55 GT4	65	(France) Alain Grand	Am	5
(France) CMR	Ginetta G55 GT4	65	(France) Didier Moureu	Am	5
(France) CD Sport	Porsche Cayman GT4 Clubsport MR	30	(France) Morgan Moullin-Traffort	PA	1–2
(France) CD Sport	Porsche Cayman GT4 Clubsport MR	30	(France) Benjamin Ricci	PA	1–2
(France) CD Sport	Porsche Cayman GT4 Clubsport MR	30	(France) Kevin Bole Besançon	PA	6
(France) CD Sport	Porsche Cayman GT4 Clubsport MR	30	(France) Matthieu Cheruy	PA	6
(France) CD Sport	Porsche Cayman GT4 Clubsport MR	31	(France) Morgan Moullin-Traffort	PA	6
(France) CD Sport	Porsche Cayman GT4 Clubsport MR	31	(France) Benjamin Ricci	PA	6
(Spain) Bullitt Racing and Race	McLaren 570S GT4	33	(United Kingdom) Andy Meyrick	PA	All
(Spain) Bullitt Racing and Race	McLaren 570S GT4	33	(United Kingdom) Stephen Pattrick	PA	All
(United Kingdom) Brookspeed International Motorsport	Porsche Cayman GT4 Clubsport MR	40	(United Kingdom) Freddie Hunt	PA	1
(United Kingdom) Brookspeed International Motorsport	Porsche Cayman GT4 Clubsport MR	40	(United Kingdom) Steven Liquorish	PA	1
(United Kingdom) Brookspeed International Motorsport	Porsche Cayman GT4 Clubsport MR	40	(United Kingdom) Freddie Hunt	PA	1
(United Kingdom) Brookspeed International Motorsport	Porsche Cayman GT4 Clubsport MR	40	(United Kingdom) Freddie Hunt	S	2
(United Kingdom) Brookspeed International Motorsport	Porsche Cayman GT4 Clubsport MR	40	(United States) Chase Owen	S	2
(Italy) Scuderia Villorba Corse	Maserati GranTurismo MC GT4	50	(Poland) Antoni Chodzen	PA (Note: Antoni Chodzen and Piotr Chodzen scored Am class points at Round 1, but from Round 3 on they scored Pro-Am class points, after Piotr was promoted from the bronze to the silver driver categorisation.)	1, 3–4, 6
(Italy) Scuderia Villorba Corse	Maserati GranTurismo MC GT4	50	(Poland) Piotr Chodzen	PA	1, 3–4, 6
(Italy) Scuderia Villorba Corse	Maserati GranTurismo MC GT4	71	(Italy) Paolo Meloni	S	All
(Italy) Scuderia Villorba Corse	Maserati GranTurismo MC GT4	71	(Italy) Massimiliano Tresoldi	S	All
(Italy) Scuderia Villorba Corse	Maserati GranTurismo MC GT4	77	(Italy) Romy Dall'Antonia	Am	All
(Italy) Scuderia Villorba Corse	Maserati GranTurismo MC GT4	77	(Italy) Giuseppe Fascicolo	Am	All
(Italy) Scuderia Villorba Corse	Maserati GranTurismo MC GT4	93	(Italy) Manuela Gostner	Am	All
(Sweden) Primus Racing	Ginetta G55 GT4	51	(Denmark) Peter Larsen	Am	5
(Sweden) Primus Racing	Ginetta G55 GT4	51	(Sweden) Johan Rosén	Am	5
(Sweden) Ricknäs Motorsport	Porsche 997 GT4	55	(Sweden) Håkan Ricknäs	Am	5
(Sweden) Ricknäs Motorsport	Porsche 997 GT4	55	(Sweden) Marcus Söderholm	Am	5
(United Kingdom) Tolman Motorsport	McLaren 570S GT4	56	(United Kingdom) Joe Osborne	PA	2
(United Kingdom) Tolman Motorsport	McLaren 570S GT4	56	(United Kingdom) David Pattison	PA	2
(United Kingdom) Ebor GT Motorsport	Maserati GranTurismo MC GT4	60	(United Kingdom) Charlie Fagg	S	5
(United Kingdom) Ebor GT Motorsport	Maserati GranTurismo MC GT4	60	(United Kingdom) Phil Glew	S	5
(United Kingdom) Academy Motorsport	Aston Martin V8 Vantage GT4	61	(United Kingdom) Mike Hart	S	2
(United Kingdom) Academy Motorsport	Aston Martin V8 Vantage GT4	61	(United Kingdom) Dave Robinson	S	2
(United Kingdom) Academy Motorsport	Aston Martin V8 Vantage GT4	62	(United Kingdom) Will Moore	S	All
(United Kingdom) Academy Motorsport	Aston Martin V8 Vantage GT4	62	(United Kingdom) Matt Nicoll-Jones	S	All
(Germany) Terting Mueskens Racing	Porsche Cayman GT4 Clubsport MR	69	(Czech Republic) Daniel Rymes	PA	1–4
(Germany) Terting Mueskens Racing	Porsche Cayman GT4 Clubsport MR	69	(Germany) Peter Terting	PA	1–4
(Italy) Autorlando Sport	Porsche 997 GT4	75	(Italy) Dario Cerati	Am	All
(Italy) Autorlando Sport	Porsche 997 GT4	75	(Italy) Maurizio Fondi	Am	All
(Italy) Autorlando Sport	Porsche 997 GT4	76	(Italy) Giuseppe Ghezzi	Am	All
(Italy) Autorlando Sport	Porsche 997 GT4	76	(Italy) Manuele Mengozzi	Am	1–2, 5–6
(Italy) Autorlando Sport	Porsche 997 GT4	76	(Italy) Alessandro Giovanelli	Am	3–4
(Poland) eSky AKVO Racing Team	Maserati GranTurismo MC GT4	80	(Poland) Łukasz Kręski	Am	4
(Poland) eSky AKVO Racing Team	Maserati GranTurismo MC GT4	80	(Poland) Maciej Marcinkiewicz	Am	4
(Austria) HP Racing	Porsche Cayman GT4 Clubsport MR	88	(Liechtenstein) Wolfgang Risch	Am	1, 3–4
(Austria) HP Racing	Porsche Cayman GT4 Clubsport MR	88	(Switzerland) Peter Ebner	Am	1
(Austria) HP Racing	Porsche Cayman GT4 Clubsport MR	88	(Germany) Coach McKansy	Am	3–4
(Poland) Sellite Racing Team	Maserati GranTurismo MC GT4	99	(Poland) Wojciech Łopałło	Am	1, 3–4
(Poland) Sellite Racing Team	Maserati GranTurismo MC GT4	99	(Poland) Łukasz Zielski	Am	1, 3–4
(United Kingdom) Ginetta Cars	Ginetta G55 GT4	100	(United Kingdom) Tom Hibbert	S	2
(United Kingdom) Ginetta Cars	Ginetta G55 GT4	100	(United Kingdom) Charlie Robertson	S	2
(Germany) RN Vision STS	Porsche Cayman GT4 Clubsport MR	111	(Romania) Petru Umbrărescu	PA (Note: Hendrik Still and Petru Umbrărescu scored Silver Cup class points at Round 2, but scored Pro-Am class points at Round 6.)	All
(Germany) RN Vision STS	Porsche Cayman GT4 Clubsport MR	111	(Italy) Gabriele Piana	PA	1, 3–5
(Germany) RN Vision STS	Porsche Cayman GT4 Clubsport MR	111	(Germany) Hendrik Still	PA	2, 6
(Germany) RN Vision STS	Porsche Cayman GT4 Clubsport MR	112	(Germany) John-Louis Jasper	S	All
(Germany) RN Vision STS	Porsche Cayman GT4 Clubsport MR	112	(Bulgaria) Pavel Lefterov	S	All
(United Kingdom) Generation AMR Super Racing	Aston Martin V8 Vantage GT4	144	(United Kingdom) Matthew George	PA	2, 6
(United Kingdom) Generation AMR Super Racing	Aston Martin V8 Vantage GT4	144	(United Kingdom) James Holder	PA	2, 6
(France) TFT Racing	Porsche Cayman GT4 Clubsport MR	222	(Switzerland) Niki Leutwiler	PA	2, 5–6
(France) TFT Racing	Porsche Cayman GT4 Clubsport MR	222	(Spain) Ander Vilariño	PA	2, 5–6

Icon	Class
PA	Pro-Am Cup
S	Silver Cup
Am	Am Cup

== Race results ==
Bold indicates overall winner.

Round		Circuit	Pole position	Silver Winners	Pro-Am Winners	Am Winners
1	R1	(Italy) Misano	(Netherlands) No. 9 Las Moras Racing	**(Germany) No. 34 RYS Team KISKA**	(Germany) No. 111 RN Vision STS	(Italy) No. 76 Autorlando Sport
1	R1	(Italy) Misano	(Netherlands) Luc Braams (Netherlands) Duncan Huisman	**(Venezuela) Jonathan Cecotto** **(Germany) Lennart Marioneck**	(Italy) Gabriele Piana (Romania) Petru Umbrărescu	(Italy) Giuseppe Ghezzi (Italy) Manuele Mengozzi
1	R2	(Italy) Misano	(United Kingdom) No. 62 Academy Motorsport	(Germany) No. 92 PROsport Performance	**(Germany) No. 91 PROsport Performance**	(Austria) No. 88 HP Racing
1	R2	(Italy) Misano	(United Kingdom) Will Moore (United Kingdom) Matt Nicoll-Jones	(Belgium) Alessio Picariello (Denmark) Kevin Rossel	**(Denmark) Nicolaj Møller Madsen** **(Germany) Jörg Viebahn**	(Switzerland) Peter Ebner (Liechtenstein) Wolfgang Risch
2	R1	(United Kingdom) Brands Hatch	(United Kingdom) No. 100 Ginetta Cars	**(United Kingdom) No. 100 Ginetta Cars**	(United Kingdom) No. 56 Tolman Motorsport	(Italy) No. 76 Autorlando Sport
2	R1	(United Kingdom) Brands Hatch	(United Kingdom) Tom Hibbert (United Kingdom) Charlie Robertson	**(United Kingdom) Tom Hibbert** **(United Kingdom) Charlie Robertson**	(United Kingdom) Joe Osborne (United Kingdom) David Pattison	(Italy) Giuseppe Ghezzi (Italy) Manuele Mengozzi
2	R2	(United Kingdom) Brands Hatch	(United Kingdom) No. 100 Ginetta Cars	**(United Kingdom) No. 100 Ginetta Cars**	(France) No. 26 CMR	(Italy) No. 93 Scuderia Villorba Corse
2	R2	(United Kingdom) Brands Hatch	(United Kingdom) Tom Hibbert (United Kingdom) Charlie Robertson	**(United Kingdom) Tom Hibbert** **(United Kingdom) Charlie Robertson**	(France) Soheil Ayari (France) Nyls Stievenart	(Italy) Manuela Gostner
3	R1	(Austria) Red Bull Ring	(Spain) No. 33 Bullitt Racing and Race	**(Netherlands) No. 8 Ekris Motorsport**	(Netherlands) No. 9 Las Moras Racing	(Germany) No. 94 RYS Team Schönramer / Racecom
3	R1	(Austria) Red Bull Ring	(United Kingdom) Andy Meyrick (United Kingdom) Stephen Pattrick	**(Netherlands) Ricardo van der Ende** **(Netherlands) Max Koebolt**	(Netherlands) Luc Braams (Netherlands) Duncan Huisman	(Austria) Achim Mörtl
3	R2	(Austria) Red Bull Ring	(Germany) No. 54 RYS Team Pankl	**(Netherlands) No. 8 Ekris Motorsport**	(Netherlands) No. 9 Las Moras Racing	(Bulgaria) No. 11 Sofia Car Motorsport by BADI
3	R2	(Austria) Red Bull Ring	(Germany) Arne Hoffmeister (Germany) Benjamin Mazatis	**(Netherlands) Ricardo van der Ende** **(Netherlands) Max Koebolt**	(Netherlands) Luc Braams (Netherlands) Duncan Huisman	(Romania) Eduard Anton
4	R1	Slovakia Ring	(Germany) No. 22 Allied-Racing	**(Netherlands) No. 8 Ekris Motorsport**	(Germany) No. 111 RN Vision STS	(Italy) No. 76 Autorlando Sport
4	R1	Slovakia Ring	(Germany) Jan Kasperlik (Germany) Tim Stupple	**(Netherlands) Ricardo van der Ende** **(Netherlands) Max Koebolt**	(Italy) Gabriele Piana (Romania) Petru Umbrărescu	(Italy) Giuseppe Ghezzi (Italy) Alessandro Giovanelli
4	R2	Slovakia Ring	(Germany) No. 111 RN Vision STS	**(Germany) No. 14 RYS Team KTM**	(Germany) No. 111 RN Vision STS	(Bulgaria) No. 11 Sofia Car Motorsport
4	R2	Slovakia Ring	(Italy) Gabriele Piana (Romania) Petru Umbrărescu	**(Austria) Eike Angermayr** **(Austria) Reinhard Kofler**	(Italy) Gabriele Piana (Romania) Petru Umbrărescu	(Bulgaria) Ivan Vlachkov
5	R1	(Netherlands) Zandvoort	(Netherlands) No. 8 Ekris Motorsport	**(United Kingdom) No. 60 Ebor GT Motorsport**	(Germany) No. 22 Allied-Racing	(Germany) No. 94 RYS Team Schönramer / Racecom
5	R1	(Netherlands) Zandvoort	(Netherlands) Ricardo van der Ende (Netherlands) Max Koebolt	**(United Kingdom) Charlie Fagg** **(United Kingdom) Phil Glew**	(Germany) Jan Kasperlik (Germany) Jörg Viebahn	(Romania) Eduard Anton (Austria) Achim Mörtl
5	R2	(Netherlands) Zandvoort	(United Kingdom) No. 60 Ebor GT Motorsport	**(United Kingdom) No. 60 Ebor GT Motorsport**	(Germany) No. 111 RN Vision STS	(Italy) No. 77 Scuderia Villorba Corse
5	R2	(Netherlands) Zandvoort	(United Kingdom) Charlie Fagg (United Kingdom) Phil Glew	**(United Kingdom) Charlie Fagg** **(United Kingdom) Phil Glew**	(Italy) Gabriele Piana (Romania) Petru Umbrărescu	(Italy) Romy Dall'Antonia (Italy) Giuseppe Fascicolo
6	R1	(Germany) Nürburgring	(Netherlands) No. 8 Ekris Motorsport	**(Netherlands) No. 8 Ekris Motorsport**	(France) No. 4 Energy by ART	(Italy) No. 76 Autorlando Sport
6	R1	(Germany) Nürburgring	(Netherlands) Ricardo van der Ende (Netherlands) Max Koebolt	**(Netherlands) Ricardo van der Ende** **(Netherlands) Max Koebolt**	(France) Grégoire Demoustier (France) Alain Ferté	(Italy) Giuseppe Ghezzi (Italy) Manuele Mengozzi
6	R2	(Germany) Nürburgring	(Netherlands) No. 8 Ekris Motorsport	**(Netherlands) No. 8 Ekris Motorsport**	(France) No. 4 Energy by ART	(Italy) No. 76 Autorlando Sport
6	R2	(Germany) Nürburgring	(Netherlands) Ricardo van der Ende (Netherlands) Max Koebolt	**(Netherlands) Ricardo van der Ende** **(Netherlands) Max Koebolt**	(France) Grégoire Demoustier (France) Alain Ferté	(Italy) Giuseppe Ghezzi (Italy) Manuele Mengozzi

== Championship standings ==
Scoring system

Championship points were awarded for the first ten positions in each race. Entries were required to complete 75% of the winning car's race distance in order to be classified and earn points. Individual drivers were required to participate for a minimum of 25 minutes in order to earn championship points in any race.

Position	**1st**	**2nd**	**3rd**	**4th**	**5th**	**6th**	**7th**	**8th**	**9th**	**10th**
Points	25	18	15	12	10	8	6	4	2	1

=== Drivers' championship ===
Pos.	Driver	Team	MIS (Italy)		BRH (United Kingdom)		RBR (Austria)		SVK (Slovakia)		ZAN (Netherlands)		NÜR (Germany)		Points
Silver Class
1	(Netherlands) Ricardo van der Ende (Netherlands) Max Koebolt	(Netherlands) Ekris Motorsport	3	3	2	2	**1**	1	1	3	**7**	3	**1**	**1**	235
2	(United Kingdom) Will Moore (United Kingdom) Matt Nicoll-Jones	(United Kingdom) Academy Motorsport	2	**9**	Ret	3	Ret	DNS	2	**15**	Ret	5	2	2	107
3	(Germany) Lennart Marioneck	(Germany) RYS Team KISKA	1	6			4	3			3	6	19	28	94
4	(Hungary) Csaba Mór	(Netherlands) Equipe Verschuur	4	16	19	19	Ret	DNS	**6**	5	28	2	3	5	87
5	(United Kingdom) Finlay Hutchison	(Netherlands) Equipe Verschuur	4	16			Ret	DNS	**6**	5	28	2	3	5	86
6	(France) Jérôme Demay	(Belgium) Street Art Racing	9	7	13	6	Ret	2	17	14	26	DNS	4	9	81
7	(United Kingdom) Charlie Fagg	(United Kingdom) Sean Walkinshaw Racing	10	11	6	17									71
7	(United Kingdom) Charlie Fagg	(United Kingdom) Ebor GT Motorsport									1	**1**			71
8	(Germany) John-Louis Jasper (Bulgaria) Pavel Lefterov	(Germany) RN Vision STS	**13**	4	4	21	7	25	7	Ret	10	14	11	22	70
9	(Switzerland) Cédric Freiburghaus	(Germany) RYS Team True Racing	21	17	14	7	5	Ret	DSQ	6	9	8	13	4	69
10	(Austria) Eike Angermayr (Austria) Reinhard Kofler	(Germany) RYS Team KTM	14	Ret			Ret	6	DSQ	1	29	4	8	7	67
11	(Belgium) Jamie Vandenbalck	(Germany) RYS Team InterNetX	17	DSQ			6	14	DSQ	Ret	2	30	5	7	66
11	(Belgium) Jamie Vandenbalck	(Germany) Allied-Racing			9	Ret									66
12	(Norway) Mads Siljehaug	(Germany) RYS Team InterNetX	17	DSQ			6	14	DSQ	Ret	2	30	5	7	66
12	(Norway) Mads Siljehaug	(Germany) RYS Team True Racing			14	7									66
13	(Austria) Laura Kraihamer	(Germany) RYS Team True Racing	21	17			5	Ret	DSQ	6	9	8	13	4	59
14	(United Kingdom) Tom Hibbert (United Kingdom) Charlie Robertson	(United Kingdom) Ginetta Cars			**1**	**1**									50
15	(Belgium) Denis Dupont	(Belgium) Street Art Racing	9	7	13	6	Ret	2							48
16	(Italy) Paolo Meloni (Italy) Massimiliano Tresoldi	(Italy) Scuderia Villorba Corse	12	25	23	11	17	15	5	Ret	6	21	24	20	44
17	(Venezuela) Jonathan Cecotto	(Germany) RYS Team KISKA	1	6											37
18	(Belgium) Alessio Picariello (Denmark) Kevin Rossel	(Germany) PROsport Performance	7	2											33
19	(Austria) Gottfried Pilz	(Germany) RYS Team KISKA					4	3							33
20	(France) Julien Darras	(Belgium) Street Art Racing							17	14			4	9	32
21	(Slovakia) Samuel Sládečka (Finland) Emil Westman	(Germany) RYS Team Holinger	22	20			Ret	7	DSQ	Ret	5	15	14	14	30
22	(Germany) Arne Hoffmeister	(Germany) Reiter Engineering	6	8											28
22	(Germany) Arne Hoffmeister	(Germany) RYS Team Pankl					8	**26**							28
23	(France) Romain Sarazin	(United Kingdom) Sean Walkinshaw Racing	10	11	6	17									21
24	(Germany) Benjamin Mazatis	(Germany) RYS Team Pankl	19	Ret			8	**26**	DSQ	10					20
25	(Netherlands) Stéphane Kox	(Germany) Reiter Engineering	6	8											18
26	(Switzerland) Marylin Niederhauser	(Germany) RYS Team WP	DSQ	22			13	Ret	DSQ	12	20	24	28	24	16
27	(United Kingdom) Freddie Hunt (United States) Chase Owen	(United Kingdom) Brookspeed International Motorsport			10	10									14
28	(South Africa) Naomi Schiff	(Germany) RYS Team WP	DSQ	22			13	Ret	DSQ	12			28	24	14
29	(United Kingdom) Mike Hart (United Kingdom) Dave Robinson	(United Kingdom) Academy Motorsport			Ret	4									12
30	(Belgium) Sam Dejonghe	(Germany) Allied-Racing			9	Ret									10
31	(United States) August Macbeth	(Germany) RYS Team Pankl							DSQ	10					10
32	(Germany) Hendrik Still (Romania) Petru Umbrărescu	(Germany) RN Vision STS			11	12									8
33	(United Kingdom) Matthew Graham	(Netherlands) Equipe Verschuur			19	19									1
34	(Monaco) Micah Stanley	(Belgium) Street Art Racing									26	DNS			1
	(Germany) Marek Böckmann (Denmark) Nicolaj Møller Madsen	(Germany) PROsport Performance											20	30	0
	(United States) Brett Sandberg	(Germany) RYS Team Pankl	19	Ret											0
	(Finland) Henri Kauppi (Switzerland) Nikolaj Rogivue	(Germany) RYS Team Schönramer / Neptun / Racecom											Ret	26	0
	(Czech Republic) Erik Janiš (Czech Republic) Josef Záruba	(Germany) RYS Team KISKA							DSQ	Ret					
Guest drivers ineligible to score Silver Cup class points
	(United Kingdom) Phil Glew	(United Kingdom) Ebor GT Motorsport									1	**1**			
	(Netherlands) Willem Meijer	(Germany) RYS Team KISKA									3	6	19	28	
	(Australia) Caitlin Wood	(Germany) RYS Team WP									20	24			
Pro-Am Class
1	(Netherlands) Luc Braams (Netherlands) Duncan Huisman	(Netherlands) Las Moras Racing	**Ret**	10	7	**14**	2	5	8	4	Ret	29	9	10	166
2	(Romania) Petru Umbrărescu	(Germany) RN Vision STS	5	14			Ret	**11**	3	**2**	8	7	10	Ret	150
3	(Germany) Jan Kasperlik	(Germany) Allied-Racing	8	5	12	Ret	16	10	**9**	19	4	27	Ret	17	147
4	(Italy) Gabriele Piana	(Germany) RN Vision STS	5	14			Ret	**11**	3	**2**	8	7			138
5	(Germany) Tim Stupple	(Germany) Allied-Racing	8	5	12	Ret	16	10	**9**	19					100
6	(France) Grégoire Demoustier (France) Alain Ferté	(France) Energy by ART			15	18					13	13	6	3	93
7	(Czech Republic) Daniel Rymes (Germany) Peter Terting	(Germany) Terting Mueskens Racing	26	13	21	24	21	17	4	7					81
8	(Germany) Jörg Viebahn	(Germany) PROsport Performance	Ret	**1**	DNS	DNS									72
8	(Germany) Jörg Viebahn	(Germany) Allied-Racing									4	27	Ret	17	72
9	(United Kingdom) Andy Meyrick (United Kingdom) Stephen Pattrick	(Spain) Bullitt Racing and Race	25	18	26	Ret	**DSQ**	8	21	20	25	Ret	Ret	Ret	65
10	(Switzerland) Niki Leutwiler (Spain) Ander Vilariño	(France) TFT Racing			**5**	20					19	22	7	Ret	64
11	(Poland) Antoni Chodzen (Poland) Piotr Chodzen	(Italy) Scuderia Villorba Corse					12	DSQ	22	21			27	21	54
12	(United Kingdom) Matthew George (United Kingdom) James Holder	(United Kingdom) Generation AMR Super Racing			8	9							31	13	48
13	(United Kingdom) Joe Osborne (United Kingdom) David Pattison	(United Kingdom) Tolman Motorsport			3	8									43
14	(United States) August Macbeth (Germany) Benjamin Mazatis	(Germany) RYS Team Pankl									11	12	**30**	Ret	41
15	(France) Soheil Ayari (France) Nyls Stievenart	(France) CMR			18	5					**DNS**	**Ret**			31
16	(France) Morgan Moullin-Traffort (France) Benjamin Ricci	(France) CD Sport	15	12	Ret	DNS							Ret	Ret	27
17	(Denmark) Nicolaj Møller Madsen	(Germany) PROsport Performance	Ret	**1**	DNS	DNS									25
18	(Italy) Alessandro Giovanelli (Denmark) Kevin Rossel	(Germany) PROsport Performance			20	16									14
19	(Germany) Hendrik Still	(Germany) RN Vision STS											10	Ret	12
20	(United Kingdom) Charlie Fagg (Monaco) Micah Stanley	(United Kingdom) Sean Walkinshaw Racing					Ret	20							8
21	(United Kingdom) Freddie Hunt (United Kingdom) Steven Liquorish	(United Kingdom) Brookspeed International Motorsport	Ret	19											4
Guest drivers ineligible to score Pro-Am class points
	(Germany) Dominik Schraml (Germany) Rudolf Schulte	(Germany) Schwede Motorsport											17	8	
	(Germany) Bernhard Laber	(Luxembourg) MOMO-Megatron Team Partrax									15	19	15	11	
	(Germany) Christian Danner	(Luxembourg) MOMO-Megatron Team Partrax									15	19			
	(Switzerland) Nico Rindlisbacher	(Luxembourg) MOMO-Megatron Team Partrax											15	11	
	(Germany) Marc Basseng (Germany) Phillip Bethke	(Germany) Schwede Motorsport											12	**Ret**	
	(France) Kevin Bole Besançon (France) Matthieu Cheruy	(France) CD Sport											Ret	15	
Am Class
1	(Italy) Giuseppe Ghezzi	(Italy) Autorlando Sport	**11**	**26**	16	**15**	Ret	12	10	Ret	21	11	16	**12**	195
2	(Italy) Manuele Mengozzi	(Italy) Autorlando Sport	**11**	**26**	16	**15**					21	11	16	**12**	155
3	(Italy) Manuela Gostner	(Italy) Scuderia Villorba Corse	20	27	24	13	10	19	14	Ret	12	18	25	19	145
4	(Italy) Romy Dall'Antonia (Italy) Giuseppe Fascicolo	(Italy) Scuderia Villorba Corse	Ret	Ret	17	23	11	9	11	13	18	9	**22**	Ret	142
5	(Bulgaria) Ivan Vlachkov	(Bulgaria) Sofia Car Motorsport							15	**8**	16	10	23	18	94
6	(Italy) Dario Cerati (Italy) Maurizio Fondi	(Italy) Autorlando Sport	18	21	22	Ret	Ret	21	16	16	22	23	Ret	27	92
7	(Romania) Eduard Anton	(Bulgaria) Sofia Car Motorsport by BADI	23	24	**27**	Ret	9	**4**							77
7	(Romania) Eduard Anton	(Germany) RYS Team Schönramer / Racecom							**DSQ**	Ret	**DSQ**	**28**			77
8	(Germany) Carsten Struwe	(Germany) PROsport Performance	16	Ret			14	16					18	25	64
9	(Liechtenstein) Wolfgang Risch	(Austria) HP Racing	Ret	15			15	18	18	9					63
10	(Italy) Alessandro Giovanelli	(Germany) PROsport Performance	16	Ret											58
10	(Italy) Alessandro Giovanelli	(Italy) Autorlando Sport					Ret	12	10	Ret					58
11	(Croatia) Franjo Kovac	(Germany) Besagroup Racing Team			25	22	18	24	20	18	27	26	29	29	58
12	(Germany) Joachim Bölting (Germany) Niki Schelle	(Germany) Allied-Racing							12	17			21	16	56
13	(Germany) Cora Schumacher	(Germany) Besagroup Racing Team			25	22	18	24	20	18			29	29	46
14	(Austria) Achim Mörtl	(Germany) RYS Team Schönramer / Racecom					**3**	13	**DSQ**	Ret	**DSQ**	**28**			41
15	(Germany) Freddy Kremer (Germany) Detlef Schmidt	(Germany) PROsport Performance					19	22							40
15	(Germany) Freddy Kremer (Germany) Detlef Schmidt	(Germany) Allied-Racing									24	20	26	23	40
16	(Germany) Coach McKansy	(Austria) HP Racing					15	18	18	9					38
17	(Romania) Bianca Anton	(Bulgaria) Sofia Car Motorsport by BADI	23	24	**27**	Ret									30
18	(Poland) Łukasz Kręski (Poland) Maciej Marcinkiewicz	(Poland) eSky AKVO Racing Team							13	11					27
19	(Switzerland) Peter Ebner	(Austria) HP Racing	Ret	15											25
20	(Poland) Antoni Chodzen (Poland) Piotr Chodzen	(Italy) Scuderia Villorba Corse	24	23											23
21	(Germany) Philip Hamprecht	(Germany) PROsport Performance					14	16							20
22	(Poland) Wojciech Łopałło (Poland) Łukasz Zielski	(Poland) Sellite Racing Team	DNS	WD			20	23	19	Ret					5
Guest drivers ineligible to score Am class points
	(France) Alain Grand (France) Didier Moureu	(France) CMR									14	16			
	(Germany) Dieter Schmidtmann	(Germany) PROsport Performance											18	25	
	(Denmark) Peter Larsen (Sweden) Johan Rosén	(Sweden) Primus Racing									17	17			
	(Sweden) Håkan Ricknäs (Sweden) Marcus Söderholm	(Sweden) Ricknäs Motorsport									23	25			
Pos.	Driver	Team	MIS (Italy)		BRH (United Kingdom)		RBR (Austria)		SVK (Slovakia)		ZAN (Netherlands)		NÜR (Germany)		Points

Key
Colour	Result
Gold	Race winner
Silver	2nd place
Bronze	3rd place
Green	Points finish
Blue	Non-points finish
Blue	Non-classified finish (NC)
Purple	Did not finish (Ret)
Black	Disqualified (DSQ)
Black	Excluded (EX)
White	Did not start (DNS)
White	Race cancelled (C)
White	Withdrew (WD)
Blank	Did not participate

**Bold** – Pole
Italics – Fastest Lap

=== Teams' championship ===
Pos.	Team	Manufacturer	MIS (Italy)		BRH (United Kingdom)		RBR (Austria)		SVK (Slovakia)		ZAN (Netherlands)		NÜR (Germany)		Points
Silver Cup Class
1	(Netherlands) Ekris Motorsport	BMW	3	3	2	2	**1**	1	1	3	**7**	3	**1**	**1**	240
2	(United Kingdom) Academy Motorsport	Aston Martin	2	**9**	Ret	3	Ret	DNS	2	**15**	Ret	5	2	2	109
3	(Germany) RYS Team KISKA	KTM	1	6			4	3	DSQ	Ret	3	6	19	28	99
4	(Netherlands) Equipe Verschuur	McLaren	4	16	19	19	Ret	DNS	**6**	5	28	2	3	5	97
5	(Belgium) Street Art Racing	Aston Martin	9	7	13	6	Ret	2	17	14	26	DNS	4	9	86
6	(Germany) RN Vision STS	Porsche	**13**	4	4	12	7	25	7	Ret	10	14	11	22	78
7	(Germany) RYS Team True Racing	KTM	21	17	14	7	5	Ret	DSQ	6	9	8	13	4	77
8	(Germany) RYS Team KTM	KTM	14	Ret			Ret	6	DSQ	1	29	4	8	7	70
9	(Germany) RYS Team InterNetX	KTM	17	DSQ			6	14	DSQ	Ret	2	30	5	7	63
10	(United Kingdom) Ginetta Cars	Ginetta			**1**	**1**									50
11	(Italy) Scuderia Villorba Corse	Maserati	12	25	23	11	17	15	5	Ret	6	21	24	20	50
12	(Germany) RYS Team Holinger	KTM	22	20			Ret	7	DSQ	Ret	5	15	14	14	35
13	(Germany) PROsport Performance	Porsche	7	2									20	30	33
14	(United Kingdom) Sean Walkinshaw Racing	Nissan	10	11	6	17									22
15	(Germany) RYS Team Pankl	KTM	19	Ret			8	**26**	DSQ	10					20
16	(Germany) RYS Team WP	KTM	DSQ	22			13	Ret	DSQ	12	20	24	28	24	19
17	(Germany) Reiter Engineering	KTM	6	8											18
18	(United Kingdom) Brookspeed International Motorsport	Porsche			10	10									16
19	(Germany) Allied-Racing	Porsche			9	Ret									10
	(Germany) RYS Team Schönramer / Neptun / Racecom	KTM											Ret	26	0
Guest teams ineligible to score Silver Cup class points
	(United Kingdom) Ebor GT Motorsport	Maserati									1	**1**			
Pro-Am Class
1	(Netherlands) Las Moras Racing	McLaren	**Ret**	10	7	**14**	2	5	8	4	Ret	29	9	10	166
2	(Germany) RN Vision STS	Porsche	5	14			Ret	**11**	3	**2**	8	7	10	Ret	150
3	(Germany) Allied-Racing	Porsche	8	5	12	Ret	16	10	**9**	19	4	27	Ret	17	145
4	(France) Energy by ART	Porsche			15	18					13	13	6	3	93
5	(Germany) Terting Mueskens Racing	Porsche	26	13	21	24	21	17	4	7					81
6	(Spain) Bullitt Racing and Race	McLaren	25	18	26	Ret	**DSQ**	8	21	20	25	Ret	Ret	Ret	65
7	(France) TFT Racing	Porsche			**5**	20					19	22	7	Ret	64
8	(Italy) Scuderia Villorba Corse	Maserati					12	DSQ	22	21			27	21	52
9	(United Kingdom) Generation AMR Super Racing	Aston Martin			8	9							31	13	48
10	(United Kingdom) Tolman Motorsport	McLaren			3	8									43
11	(Germany) RYS Team Pankl	KTM									11	12	**30**	Ret	41
12	(Germany) PROsport Performance	Porsche	Ret	**1**	20	16									39
13	(France) CD Sport	Porsche	15	12	Ret	DNS							Ret	15	39
14	(France) CMR	Ginetta			18	5					**DNS**	**Ret**			31
15	(United Kingdom) Sean Walkinshaw Racing	Nissan					Ret	20							8
16	(United Kingdom) Brookspeed International Motorsport	Porsche	Ret	19											4
Guest teams ineligible to score Pro-Am class points
	(Germany) Schwede Motorsport	Porsche											12	**8**	
	(Luxembourg) MOMO-Megatron Team Partrax	Porsche									15	19	15	11	
Am Class
1	(Italy) Autorlando Sport	Porsche	**11**	**21**	16	**15**	Ret	12	10	16	21	11	16	**12**	216
2	(Italy) Scuderia Villorba Corse	Maserati	20	23	17	13	10	9	11	13	12	9	**22**	19	210
3	(Bulgaria) Sofia Car Motorsport (by BADI)	SIN	23	24	**27**	Ret	9	**4**	15	**8**	16	10	23	18	175
4	(Germany) Besagroup Racing Team	Porsche			25	22	18	24	20	18	27	26	29	29	88
5	(Germany) Allied-Racing	Porsche							12	17	24	20	21	16	80
6	(Austria) HP Racing	Porsche	Ret	15			15	18	18	9					69
7	(Germany) PROsport Performance	Porsche	16	Ret			14	16					18	25	68
8	(Germany) RYS Team Schönramer / Racecom	KTM					**3**	13	**DSQ**	Ret	**DSQ**	**28**			45
9	(Poland) eSky AKVO Racing Team	Maserati							13	11					27
10	(Poland) Sellite Racing Team	Maserati	DNS	WD			20	23	19	Ret					18
Guest teams ineligible to Am class score points
	(France) CMR	Ginetta									14	16			
	(Sweden) Primus Racing	Ginetta									17	17			
	(Sweden) Ricknäs Motorsport	Porsche									23	25			
Pos.	Team	Manufacturer	MIS (Italy)		BRH (United Kingdom)		RBR (Austria)		SVK (Slovakia)		ZAN (Netherlands)		NÜR (Germany)		Points

== See also ==
- 2017 GT4 European Series Southern Cup
