= 2017 GT4 European Series Southern Cup =

The 2017 Championnat de France FFSA GT - GT4 European Series Southern Cup was the first season of the GT4 European Series Southern Cup and the 20th season of the French FFSA GT Championship, a sports car championship created and organised by the Stéphane Ratel Organisation (SRO).

== Calendar ==
At the annual press conference during the 2016 24 Hours of Spa on 29 July, the Stéphane Ratel Organisation announced the first draft of the 2017 calendar. The final calendar was announced on 23 December. The series started at Nogaro on 16 April and ended at Paul Ricard on 15 October.

Round	Circuit	Date	Supporting
1	Circuit Paul Armagnac, Nogaro, France	15–16 April	Coupes de Pâques
2	Circuit de Pau-Ville, Pau, France	20–21 May	Pau Grand Prix
3	Dijon-Prenois, Prenois, France	1–2 July	Standalone event
4	Circuit de Nevers Magny-Cours, Magny-Cours, France	9–10 September	Standalone event
5	Circuit de Barcelona-Catalunya, Montmeló, Spain	30 September–1 October	Blancpain GT Series Endurance Cup
6	Circuit Paul Ricard, Le Castellet, France	14–15 October	Standalone event

== Entry list ==
Team	Car	No.	Drivers	Class	Rounds
(Belgium) Street Art Racing	Aston Martin Vantage GT4	007	(France) Jérôme Demay	PA	3
(Belgium) Street Art Racing	Aston Martin Vantage GT4	007	(France) Sébastien Pineau	PA	3
(Belgium) Street Art Racing	Aston Martin Vantage GT4	117	(France) Éric Cayrolle	PA	1–5
(Belgium) Street Art Racing	Aston Martin Vantage GT4	117	(France) Arno Santamato	PA	1–5
(France) Racing Technology	Porsche Cayman GT4 Clubsport MR	1	(France) Jim Pla	PA	All
(France) Racing Technology	Porsche Cayman GT4 Clubsport MR	1	(France) Pierre Sancinéna	PA	All
(France) Racing Technology	Porsche Cayman GT4 Clubsport MR	11	(Switzerland) Jimmy Antunes	PA	All
(France) Racing Technology	Porsche Cayman GT4 Clubsport MR	11	(France) Franck Leherpeur	PA	1, 3–6
(France) Racing Technology	Porsche Cayman GT4 Clubsport MR	11	(France) Sylvain Noël	PA	2
(France) / TFT Racing / Porsche Zentrum Oberer Zürichsee (Note: Car No. 2 entered as TFT Racing / Porsche Zentrum Oberer Zürichsee and cars No. 19 and 21 entered as TFT Racing.); (France) / TFT Racing	Porsche Cayman GT4 Clubsport MR	2	(Switzerland) Niki Leutwiler	PA	All
(France) / TFT Racing / Porsche Zentrum Oberer Zürichsee; (France) / TFT Racing	Porsche Cayman GT4 Clubsport MR	2	(Spain) Ander Vilariño	PA	All
(France) / TFT Racing / Porsche Zentrum Oberer Zürichsee; (France) / TFT Racing	Porsche Cayman GT4 Clubsport MR	19	(France) Eric Clément	PA	All
(France) / TFT Racing / Porsche Zentrum Oberer Zürichsee; (France) / TFT Racing	Porsche Cayman GT4 Clubsport MR	19	(France) Romain Iannetta	PA	All
(France) / TFT Racing / Porsche Zentrum Oberer Zürichsee; (France) / TFT Racing	Porsche Cayman GT4 Clubsport MR	21	(Switzerland) Pierre Hirschi	Am	5
(France) Energy by ART	McLaren 570S GT4	3	(France) Simon Gachet	PA	All
(France) Energy by ART	McLaren 570S GT4	3	(France) Bruno Hernandez	PA	All
(France) Energy by ART	Porsche Cayman GT4 Clubsport MR	4	(France) Grégoire Demoustier	PA	All
(France) Energy by ART	Porsche Cayman GT4 Clubsport MR	4	(France) Alain Ferté	PA	All
(France) Riviera Motorsport	Porsche Cayman GT4 Clubsport MR	5	(France) Christophe Hamon	PA	All
(France) Riviera Motorsport	Porsche Cayman GT4 Clubsport MR	5	(France) Lonni Martins	PA	All
BMW Team France	Ekris M4 GT4	6	(France) Grégoire Depauw	Am	All
BMW Team France	Ekris M4 GT4	6	(France) Jean-Claude Lagniez	Am	All
BMW Team France	Ekris M4 GT4	9	(France) Frédéric Johais	PA	All
BMW Team France	Ekris M4 GT4	9	(France) Julien Piguet	PA	All
(Luxembourg) MOMO-Megatron Team Partrax	Porsche Cayman GT4 Clubsport MR	7	(Germany) Christian Danner	PA	6
(Luxembourg) MOMO-Megatron Team Partrax	Porsche Cayman GT4 Clubsport MR	7	(Germany) Bernhard Laber	PA	6
(France) / Speed Car / AT Events (Note: Car No. 8 entered as Speed Car / AT Events at Round 1, but from Round 2 on as Speed Car. Cars No. 444 and 445 entered as Speed Car.); (France) / Speed Car	Ginetta G55 GT4	8	(France) Robert Consani	PA	All
(France) / Speed Car / AT Events; (France) / Speed Car	Ginetta G55 GT4	8	(France) Benjamin Lariche	PA	All
(France) / Speed Car / AT Events; (France) / Speed Car	Ginetta G55 GT4	444	(France) Gaël Castelli	PA	All
(France) / Speed Car / AT Events; (France) / Speed Car	Ginetta G55 GT4	444	(France) Rodolphe Wallgren	PA	1–4
(France) / Speed Car / AT Events; (France) / Speed Car	Ginetta G55 GT4	444	(France) Philippe Salini	PA	5
(France) / Speed Car / AT Events; (France) / Speed Car	Ginetta G55 GT4	444	(France) Romain Monti	PA	6
(France) / Speed Car / AT Events; (France) / Speed Car	Ginetta G55 GT4	445	(France) Arthur Bleynie	Am	1
(France) / Speed Car / AT Events; (France) / Speed Car	Ginetta G55 GT4	445	(France) Romain Brandela	Am	1
(France) / Speed Car / AT Events; (France) / Speed Car	Ginetta G55 GT4	445	(France) Marc Sourd	Am	2
(France) / Speed Car / AT Events; (France) / Speed Car	Ginetta G55 GT4	445	(France) Dino Lunardi	PA	4
(France) / Speed Car / AT Events; (France) / Speed Car	Ginetta G55 GT4	445	(France) Philippe Salini	PA	4
(Netherlands) / Equipe Verschuur (Note: Car No. 10 entered as Equipe Verschuur and car No. 99 entered as Las Moras Racing Team.); (Netherlands) / Las Moras Racing Team	McLaren 570S GT4	10	(United Kingdom) Finlay Hutchison	PA	2, 5–6
(Netherlands) / Equipe Verschuur; (Netherlands) / Las Moras Racing Team	McLaren 570S GT4	10	(Hungary) Csaba Mór	PA	2, 5–6
(Netherlands) / Equipe Verschuur; (Netherlands) / Las Moras Racing Team	McLaren 570S GT4	99	(Netherlands) Luc Braams	PA	2, 5–6
(Netherlands) / Equipe Verschuur; (Netherlands) / Las Moras Racing Team	McLaren 570S GT4	99	(Netherlands) Duncan Huisman	PA	2, 5–6
(France) L'Espace Bienvenue	BMW M3 GT4	17	(France) Yann Clairay	PA	1
(France) L'Espace Bienvenue	BMW M3 GT4	17	(France) Julien Rodrigues	PA	1
(France) L'Espace Bienvenue	BMW M3 GT4	17	(France) Paul-Loup Chatin	PA	2
(France) L'Espace Bienvenue	BMW M3 GT4	17	(France) André Grammatico	PA	2
(France) L'Espace Bienvenue	BMW M3 GT4	17	(France) André Grammatico	Am	3–4
(France) L'Espace Bienvenue	BMW M3 GT4	17	(France) Jean-Claude de Castelli	Am	3
(France) Martinet By Alméras	Porsche Cayman GT4 Clubsport MR	18	(France) Henry Hassid	PA	All
(France) Martinet By Alméras	Porsche Cayman GT4 Clubsport MR	18	(France) Steven Palette	PA	All
(France) Martinet By Alméras	Porsche Cayman GT4 Clubsport MR	22	(France) Anthony Beltoise	PA	All
(France) Martinet By Alméras	Porsche Cayman GT4 Clubsport MR	22	(France) Olivier Estèves	PA	All
(Germany) Besagroup Racing Team	Porsche Cayman GT4 Clubsport MR	20	(Croatia) Franjo Kovac	Am	5
(France) CMR	Ginetta G55 GT4	26	(France) Soheil Ayari	PA	All
(France) CMR	Ginetta G55 GT4	26	(France) Nicolas Tardif	PA	All
(France) CMR	Maserati GranTurismo MC GT4	33	(France) Romain Monti	PA	1–3
(France) CMR	Maserati GranTurismo MC GT4	33	(France) Thierry Soave	PA	1–3
(France) CMR	Maserati GranTurismo MC GT4	33	(France) Thierry Soave	Am	5
(France) CMR	Maserati GranTurismo MC GT4	33	(France) Paul Belmondo	Am	5
(France) CMR	Ginetta G55 GT4	65	(France) Alain Grand	Am	All
(France) CMR	Ginetta G55 GT4	65	(France) Didier Moureu	Am	All
(France) CMR	Ginetta G55 GT4	111	(France) Stéphane Tribaudini	Am	3–6
(France) CMR	Ginetta G55 GT4	111	(France) Michaël Petit	Am	4–6
(France) CMR	Ginetta G55 GT4	666	(France) Georges Cabanne	Am	All
(France) CMR	Ginetta G55 GT4	666	(France) Fabien Michal	Am	All
(France) CMR	Ginetta G55 GT4	999	(France) Sylvain Debs	Am	All
(France) CMR	Ginetta G55 GT4	999	(France) Stéphane Tribaudini	Am	1–2
(France) CMR	Ginetta G55 GT4	999	(France) Gwenaël Delomier	Am	4–5
(France) CMR	Ginetta G55 GT4	999	(France) Marc Sourd	Am	6
(France) IMSA Performance	Porsche Cayman GT4 Clubsport MR	27	(France) Jean-Luc Blanchemain	Am	All
(France) IMSA Performance	Porsche Cayman GT4 Clubsport MR	27	(France) Michael Blanchemain	Am	1–2, 4–6
(France) IMSA Performance	Porsche Cayman GT4 Clubsport MR	27	(Belgium) Christian Kelders	Am	3
(France) CD Sport	Porsche Cayman GT4 Clubsport MR	30	(France) Mike Parisy	PA	All
(France) CD Sport	Porsche Cayman GT4 Clubsport MR	30	(France) Gilles Vannelet	PA	All
(France) CD Sport	Porsche Cayman GT4 Clubsport MR	31	(France) Morgan Moullin-Traffort	PA	All
(France) CD Sport	Porsche Cayman GT4 Clubsport MR	31	(France) David Hallyday	PA	1, 3–6
(France) CD Sport	Porsche Cayman GT4 Clubsport MR	31	(France) Christophe Lapierre	PA	2
(France) GP34 by Gemo Motorsport	Maserati GranTurismo MC GT4	34	(France) Philippe Marie	Am	1, 3–6
(France) GP34 by Gemo Motorsport	Maserati GranTurismo MC GT4	34	(France) Jean-Claude de Castelli	Am	1, 4
(France) GP34 by Gemo Motorsport	Maserati GranTurismo MC GT4	34	(France) Olivier Pernaut	Am	3, 6
(France) GP34 by Gemo Motorsport	Maserati GranTurismo MC GT4	34	(France) Olivier Gomez	Am	5
(United Kingdom) Generation AMR Super Racing	Aston Martin Vantage GT4	44	(United Kingdom) Matthew George	PA	1–4, 6
(United Kingdom) Generation AMR Super Racing	Aston Martin Vantage GT4	44	(United Kingdom) James Holder	PA	1–4, 6
(United States) Ford Performance	Ford Mustang GT4	46	(Canada) Scott Maxwell	Am	6
(France) Vic Team	Ginetta G55 GT4	54	(France) Jean-Philippe Lamic	Am	All
(France) Vic Team	Ginetta G55 GT4	54	(France) Paul Lamic	Am	All
(France) Vic Team	Porsche Cayman GT4 Clubsport MR	64	(France) Olivier Jouffret	PA	All
(France) Vic Team	Porsche Cayman GT4 Clubsport MR	64	(France) Eric Trémoulet	PA	All
(France) Saintéloc Racing	Porsche Cayman GT4 Clubsport MR	66	(France) Sébastien Dumez	PA	All
(France) Saintéloc Racing	Porsche Cayman GT4 Clubsport MR	66	(France) Valentin Simonet	PA	All
(France) Saintéloc Racing	Porsche Cayman GT4 Clubsport MR	69	(France) Grégory Guilvert	PA	All
(France) Saintéloc Racing	Porsche Cayman GT4 Clubsport MR	69	(Portugal) Manuel Rodrigues	PA	All
(Poland) eSky AKVO Racing Team	Maserati GranTurismo MC GT4	77	(Poland) Łukasz Kręski	Am	5
(Poland) eSky AKVO Racing Team	Maserati GranTurismo MC GT4	77	(Poland) Maciej Marcinkiewicz	Am	5
(Germany) Schubert Motorsport	BMW M4 GT4	200	(Germany) Dennis Marschall	PA	5
(Germany) Schubert Motorsport	BMW M4 GT4	200	(Netherlands) Beitske Visser	PA	5
(Spain) Bullitt Racing	McLaren 570S GT4	333	(United Kingdom) Andy Meyrick	PA	5
(Spain) Bullitt Racing	McLaren 570S GT4	333	(United Kingdom) Stephen Pattrick	PA	5
(Netherlands) Ekris Motorsport	Ekris M4 GT4	888	(Netherlands) Ricardo van der Ende	PA	2, 5–6
(Netherlands) Ekris Motorsport	Ekris M4 GT4	888	(Netherlands) Max Koebolt	PA	2, 5–6
(Netherlands) Mentos Racing	Porsche Cayman GT4 Clubsport MR	888	(Norway) Ambrogio Perfetti	Am	3
(Netherlands) Mentos Racing	Porsche Cayman GT4 Clubsport MR	888	(Switzerland) Oscar Rovelli	Am	3

Icon	Class
PA	Pro-Am
Am	Am

== Race results ==
Bold indicates overall winner.

Round		Circuit	Pole position	Pro-Am Winners	Am Winners
1	R1	(France) Nogaro	(France) No. 4 Energy by ART	**(France) No. 444 Speed Car**	(France) No. 666 CMR
1	R1	(France) Nogaro	(France) Grégoire Demoustier (France) Alain Ferté	**(France) Gaël Castelli** **(France) Rodolphe Wallgren**	(France) Georges Cabanne (France) Fabien Michal
1	R2	(France) Nogaro	(France) No. 22 Martinet By Alméras	**(France) No. 31 CD Sport**	(France) No. 54 Vic Team
1	R2	(France) Nogaro	(France) Anthony Beltoise (France) Olivier Estèves	**(France) David Hallyday** **(France) Morgan Moullin-Traffort**	(France) Jean-Philippe Lamic (France) Paul Lamic
2	R1	(France) Pau	(Netherlands) No. 888 Ekris Motorsport	**(France) No. 11 Racing Technology**	(France) No. 54 Vic Team
2	R1	(France) Pau	(Netherlands) Ricardo van der Ende (Netherlands) Max Koebolt	**(Switzerland) Jimmy Antunes** **(France) Sylvain Noël**	(France) Jean-Philippe Lamic (France) Paul Lamic
2	R2	(France) Pau	(France) No. 26 CMR	**(Netherlands) No. 888 Ekris Motorsport**	(France) No. 27 IMSA Performance
2	R2	(France) Pau	(France) Soheil Ayari (France) Nicolas Tardif	**(Netherlands) Ricardo van der Ende** **(Netherlands) Max Koebolt**	(France) Jean-Luc Blanchemain (France) Michel Blanchemain
3	R1	(France) Dijon-Prenois	(France) No. 30 CD Sport	**(France) No. 18 Martinet By Alméras**	(France) No. 111 CMR
3	R1	(France) Dijon-Prenois	(France) Mike Parisy (France) Gilles Vannelet	**(France) Henry Hassid** **(France) Steven Palette**	(France) Stéphane Tribaudini
3	R2	(France) Dijon-Prenois	(France) No. 69 Saintéloc Racing	(France) No. 8 Speed Car	**(France) No. 111 CMR**
3	R2	(France) Dijon-Prenois	(France) Grégory Guilvert (Portugal) Manuel Rodrigues	(France) Robert Consani (France) Benjamin Lariche	**(France) Stéphane Tribaudini**
4	R1	(France) Magny-Cours	No. 9 BMW Team France	**No. 9 BMW Team France**	(France) No. 111 CMR
4	R1	(France) Magny-Cours	(France) Frédéric Johais (France) Julien Piguet	**(France) Frédéric Johais** **(France) Julien Piguet**	(France) Michaël Petit (France) Stéphane Tribaudini
4	R2	(France) Magny-Cours	No. 9 BMW Team France	**No. 9 BMW Team France**	(France) No. 111 CMR
4	R2	(France) Magny-Cours	(France) Frédéric Johais (France) Julien Piguet	**(France) Frédéric Johais** **(France) Julien Piguet**	(France) Michaël Petit (France) Stéphane Tribaudini
5	R1	(Spain) Barcelona-Catalunya	(France) No. 111 CMR	**(Germany) No. 200 Schubert Motorsport**	(France) No. 34 GP34 by Gemo Motorsport
5	R1	(Spain) Barcelona-Catalunya	(France) Michaël Petit (France) Stéphane Tribaudini	**(Germany) Dennis Marschall** **(Netherlands) Beitske Visser**	(France) Olivier Gomez (France) Philippe Marie
5	R2	(Spain) Barcelona-Catalunya	(France) No. 26 CMR	**(France) No. 1 Racing Technology**	(France) No. 34 GP34 by Gemo Motorsport
5	R2	(Spain) Barcelona-Catalunya	(France) Soheil Ayari (France) Nicolas Tardif	**(France) Jim Pla** **(France) Pierre Sancinéna**	(France) Olivier Gomez (France) Philippe Marie
6	R1	(France) Paul Ricard	(Netherlands) No. 99 Las Moras Racing Team	**(Netherlands) No. 99 Las Moras Racing Team**	(France) No. 111 CMR
6	R1	(France) Paul Ricard	(Netherlands) Max Braams (Netherlands) Duncan Huisman	**(Netherlands) Max Braams** **(Netherlands) Duncan Huisman**	(France) Michaël Petit (France) Stéphane Tribaudini
6	R2	(France) Paul Ricard	No. 9 BMW Team France	**(Netherlands) No. 99 Las Moras Racing Team**	(France) No. 111 CMR
6	R2	(France) Paul Ricard	(France) Frédéric Johais (France) Julien Piguet	**(Netherlands) Max Braams** **(Netherlands) Duncan Huisman**	(France) Michaël Petit (France) Stéphane Tribaudini

== Championship standings ==
Scoring system

Championship points were awarded for the first ten positions in each race. Entries were required to complete 75% of the winning car's race distance in order to be classified and earn points. Individual drivers were required to participate for a minimum of 25 minutes in order to earn championship points in any race.

Position	**1st**	**2nd**	**3rd**	**4th**	**5th**	**6th**	**7th**	**8th**	**9th**	**10th**
Points	25	18	15	12	10	8	6	4	2	1

=== Drivers' championship ===
Pos.	Driver	Team	NOG (France)		PAU (France)		DIJ (France)		MAG (France)		CAT (Spain)		LEC (France)		Points
Pro-Am Class
1	(France) Mike Parisy (France) Gilles Vannelet	(France) CD Sport	2	4	7	2	**2**	4	6	EX	8	3	4	5	138
2	(France) Robert Consani (France) Benjamin Lariche	(France) Speed Car / AT Events	23	3											130
2	(France) Robert Consani (France) Benjamin Lariche	(France) Speed Car			3	4	3	2	2	5	**28**	6	5	9	130
3	(France) Frédéric Johais (France) Julien Piguet	BMW Team France	Ret	16	8	DNS	Ret	9	**1**	**1**	4	7	2	**4**	109
4	(France) Henry Hassid (France) Steven Palette	(France) Martinet By Alméras	7	9	6	Ret	1	10	9	2	16	5	7	2	99
5	(France) Olivier Jouffret (France) Eric Trémoulet	(France) Vic Team	4	2	Ret	6	15	13	5	7	6	19	3	Ret	79
6	(France) Jim Pla (France) Pierre Sancinéna	(France) Racing Technology	21	6	4	7	26	5	12	10	7	1	23	26	72
7	(Switzerland) Niki Leutwiler (Spain) Ander Vilariño	(France) TFT Racing / Porsche Zentrum Oberer Zürichsee	6	8	11	5	Ret	6	11	11	2	9	8	20	64
8	(France) Grégoire Demoustier (France) Alain Ferté	(France) Energy by ART	**3**	Ret	10	11	11	14	4	4	5	12	9	6	63
9	(France) Morgan Moullin-Traffort	(France) CD Sport	9	1	13	8	7	11	18	Ret	15	4	10	7	59
10	(Netherlands) Ricardo van der Ende (Netherlands) Max Koebolt	(Netherlands) Ekris Motorsport			**EX**	1					3	25	Ret	3	58
11	(France) David Hallyday	(France) CD Sport	9	1			7	11	18	Ret	15	4	10	7	55
12	(France) Gaël Castelli	(France) Speed Car	1	7	5	Ret	24	18	8	8	9	24	Ret	12	55
13	(France) Soheil Ayari (France) Nicolas Tardif	(France) CMR	Ret	14	2	**22**	14	7	3	Ret	Ret	**8**	6	Ret	53
14	(Netherlands) Luc Braams (Netherlands) Duncan Huisman	(Netherlands) Las Moras Racing Team			DNS	DNS					10	13	**1**	1	52
15	(France) Rodolphe Wallgren	(France) Speed Car	1	7	5	Ret	24	18	8	8					51
16	(France) Christophe Hamon (France) Lonni Martins	(France) Riviera Motorsport	13	13	18	10	6	15	Ret	13	14	2	15	15	29
17	(Switzerland) Jimmy Antunes	(France) Racing Technology	Ret	10	1	17	12	26	16	9	13	11	14	Ret	28
18	(France) Sylvain Noël	(France) Racing Technology			1	17									25
19	(France) Eric Clément (France) Romain Iannetta	(France) TFT Racing	5	23	17	19	8	DSQ	13	6	DSQ	DNS	25	25	24
20	(France) Simon Gachet (France) Bruno Hernandez	(France) Energy by ART	25	Ret	15	9	9	28	21	3	25	14	Ret	Ret	21
21	(France) Éric Cayrolle (France) Arno Santamato	(Belgium) Street Art Racing	10	15	14	Ret	16	3	Ret	Ret	Ret	Ret			19
22	(France) Sébastien Dumez (France) Valentin Simonet	(France) Saintéloc Racing	12	Ret	16	3	13	20	10	22	11	18	11	10	19
23	(France) Grégory Guilvert (Portugal) Manuel Rodrigues	(France) Saintéloc Racing	11	Ret	Ret	14	4	**8**	26	DNS	Ret	10	Ret	16	19
24	(France) Anthony Beltoise (France) Olivier Estèves	(France) Martinet By Alméras	14	**5**	Ret	13	10	12	24	Ret	Ret	DNS	13	13	12
25	(United Kingdom) Finlay Hutchison (Hungary) Csaba Mór	(Netherlands) Equipe Verschuur			9	21					DNS	DNS	22	8	6
26	(France) Romain Monti	(France) CMR	8	11	WD	WD	Ret	DNS							4
26	(France) Romain Monti	(France) Speed Car											Ret	12	4
27	(France) Thierry Soave	(France) CMR	8	11	WD	WD	Ret	DNS							4
28	(France) Christophe Lapierre	(France) CD Sport			13	8									4
29	(France) Philippe Salini	(France) Speed Car							19	16	9	24			4
30	(France) Franck Leherpeur	(France) Racing Technology	Ret	10			12	26	16	9	13	11	14	Ret	3
	(United Kingdom) Matthew George (United Kingdom) James Holder	(United Kingdom) Generation AMR Super Racing	24	22	23	20	20	23	17	20			16	Ret	0
	(France) Dino Lunardi	(France) Speed Car							19	16					0
	(France) Paul-Loup Chatin (France) André Grammatico	(France) L'Espace Bienvenue			21	16									0
	(France) Jérôme Demay (France) Sébastien Pineau	(Belgium) Street Art Racing					21	16							0
	(France) Yann Clairay (France) Julien Rodrigues	(France) L'Espace Bienvenue	17	24											0
Guest drivers ineligible to score Pro-Am class points
	(Germany) Dennis Marschall (Netherlands) Beitske Visser	(Germany) Schubert Motorsport									1	15			
	(Germany) Christian Danner (Germany) Bernhard Laber	(Luxembourg) MOMO-Megatron Team Partrax											17	23	
	(United Kingdom) Andy Meyrick (United Kingdom) Stephen Pattrick	(Spain) Bullitt Racing									DNS	DNS			
Am Class
1	(France) Stéphane Tribaudini	(France) CMR	19	**17**	22	Ret	**5**	**1**	**7**	12	**27**	29	**12**	11	198
2	(France) Georges Cabanne (France) Fabien Michal	(France) CMR	15	21	**Ret**	15	18	21	14	15	17	21	24	17	164
3	(France) Jean-Philippe Lamic (France) Paul Lamic	(France) Vic Team	**16**	12	12	**18**	17	Ret	Ret	**24**	26	20	20	19	144
4	(France) Jean-Luc Blanchemain	(France) IMSA Performance	Ret	DNS	20	12	23	24	22	18	19	22	19	18	125
5	(France) Philippe Marie	(France) GP34 by Gemo Motorsport	20	20			Ret	25	20	23	12	**16**	DNS	14	110
6	(France) Michael Blanchemain	(France) IMSA Performance	Ret	DNS	20	12			22	18	19	22	19	18	109
7	(France) Michaël Petit	(France) CMR							**7**	12	**27**	29	**12**	11	106
8	(France) Grégoire Depauw (France) Jean-Claude Lagniez	BMW Team France	22	19	Ret	Ret	Ret	Ret	15	14	22	17	18	22	101
9	(France) Sylvain Debs	(France) CMR	19	**17**	22	Ret	Ret	27	25	21	18	23	21	24	95
10	(France) Alain Grand (France) Didier Moureu	(France) CMR	DNS	DNS	19	Ret	19	17	23	17	20	30	Ret	21	88
11	(France) Jean-Claude de Castelli	(France) GP34 by Gemo Motorsport	20	20					20	23					52
11	(France) Jean-Claude de Castelli	(France) L'Espace Bienvenue					25	22							52
12	(France) Gwenaël Delomier	(France) CMR							25	21	18	23			35
13	(France) Arthur Bleynie (France) Romain Brandela	(France) Speed Car	18	18											30
14	(Norway) Ambrogio Perfetti (Switzerland) Oscar Rovelli	(Netherlands) Mentos Racing					22	19							25
15	(France) Olivier Pernaut	(France) GP34 by Gemo Motorsport					Ret	25					DNS	14	24
16	(France) André Grammatico	(France) L'Espace Bienvenue					25	22	Ret	19					24
17	(Belgium) Christian Kelders	(France) IMSA Performance					23	24							16
18	(France) Marc Sourd	(France) Speed Car			EX	DNS									14
18	(France) Marc Sourd	(France) CMR											21	24	14
19	(France) Thierry Soave	(France) CMR									21	27			14
Guest drivers ineligible to score Am class points
	(France) Olivier Gomez	(France) GP34 by Gemo Motorsport									12	**16**			
	(France) Paul Belmondo	(France) CMR									21	27			
	(Croatia) Franjo Kovac	(Germany) Besagroup Racing Team									24	26			
	(Poland) Łukasz Kręski (Poland) Maciej Marcinkiewicz	(Poland) eSky AKVO Racing Team									23	28			
	(Canada) Scott Maxwell	(United States) Ford Performance											Ret	**Ret**	
	(Switzerland) Pierre Hirschi	(France) TFT Racing									Ret	DNS			
Pos.	Driver	Team	NOG (France)		PAU (France)		DIJ (France)		MAG (France)		CAT (Spain)		LEC (France)		Points

Key
Colour	Result
Gold	Race winner
Silver	2nd place
Bronze	3rd place
Green	Points finish
Blue	Non-points finish
Blue	Non-classified finish (NC)
Purple	Did not finish (Ret)
Black	Disqualified (DSQ)
Black	Excluded (EX)
White	Did not start (DNS)
White	Race cancelled (C)
White	Withdrew (WD)
Blank	Did not participate

**Bold** – Pole
Italics – Fastest Lap

=== Teams' championship ===
Pos.	Team	Manufacturer	NOG (France)		PAU (France)		DIJ (France)		MAG (France)		CAT (Spain)		LEC (France)		Points
Pro-Am Class
1	(France) Speed Car (/ AT Events)	Ginetta	1	3	3	4	3	2	2	5	**9**	6	5	9	165
2	(France) CD Sport	Porsche	2	1	7	2	**2**	4	6	Ret	8	3	4	5	155
3	(France) Martinet By Alméras	Porsche	7	**5**	6	13	1	10	9	2	16	5	7	2	120
4	BMW Team France	BMW	Ret	16	8	DNS	Ret	9	**1**	**1**	4	7	2	**4**	116
5	(France) Racing Technology	Porsche	21	6	1	7	12	5	12	9	7	1	14	26	97
6	(France) TFT Racing (/ Porsche Zentrum Oberer Zürichsee)	Porsche	5	8	11	5	8	6	11	6	2	9	8	20	93
7	(France) Vic Team	Porsche	4	2	Ret	6	15	13	5	7	6	19	3	Ret	83
8	(France) Energy by ART	McLaren; Porsche	**3**	Ret	10	9	9	14	4	3	5	12	9	6	79
9	(France) CMR	Ginetta; Maserati	8	11	2	**22**	14	7	3	Ret	Ret	**8**	6	Ret	69
10	(Netherlands) Equipe Verschuur / Las Moras Racing Team (Note: Equipe Verschuur and Las Moras Racing Team scored points together as one team in Pau and at Barcelona-Catalunya, but Equipe Verschuur scored points separately at Paul Ricard.)	McLaren			9	21					10	13	**1**	1	58
11	(Netherlands) Ekris Motorsport	BMW			**EX**	1					3	25	Ret	3	58
12	(France) Saintéloc Racing	Porsche	11	Ret	16	3	4	**8**	10	22	11	10	11	10	46
13	(France) Riviera Motorsport	Porsche	13	13	18	10	6	15	Ret	13	14	2	15	15	40
14	(Belgium) Street Art Racing	Aston Martin	10	15	14	Ret	16	3	Ret	Ret	Ret	Ret			25
15	(Netherlands) Equipe Verschuur	McLaren											22	8	6
16	(United Kingdom) Generation AMR Super Racing	Aston Martin	24	22	23	20	20	23	17	20			16	Ret	2
	(France) L'Espace Bienvenue	BMW	17	24	21	16									0
Guest teams ineligible to score Pro-Am class points
	(Germany) Schubert Motorsport	BMW									1	15			
	(Luxembourg) MOMO-Megatron Team Partrax	Porsche											17	23	
	(Spain) Bullitt Racing	McLaren									DNS	DNS			
Am Class
1	(France) CMR	Ginetta; Maserati	15	**17**	**19**	15	**5**	**1**	**7**	12	**17**	21	**12**	11	259
2	(France) Vic Team	Ginetta	**16**	12	12	**18**	17	Ret	Ret	**24**	26	20	20	19	158
3	(France) IMSA Performance	Porsche	Ret	DNS	20	12	23	24	22	18	19	22	19	18	146
4	(France) GP34 by Gemo Motorsport	Maserati	20	20			Ret	25	20	23	12	**16**	DNS	14	125
5	BMW Team France	BMW	22	19	Ret	Ret	Ret	Ret	15	14	22	17	18	22	116
6	(France) L'Espace Bienvenue	BMW					25	22	Ret	19					37
7	(Netherlands) Mentos Racing	Porsche					22	19							33
8	(France) Speed Car	Ginetta	18	18	EX	DNS									30
Guest teams ineligible to score Am class points
	(Germany) Besagroup Racing Team	Porsche									24	26			
	(Poland) eSky AKVO Racing Team	Maserati									23	28			
	(United States) Ford Performance	Ford											Ret	**Ret**	
	(France) TFT Racing	Porsche									Ret	DNS			
Pos.	Team	Manufacturer	NOG (France)		PAU (France)		DIJ (France)		MAG (France)		CAT (Spain)		LEC (France)		Points

== See also ==
- 2017 GT4 European Series Northern Cup
