= 2026 ADAC GT4 Germany =

Sports car racing series season

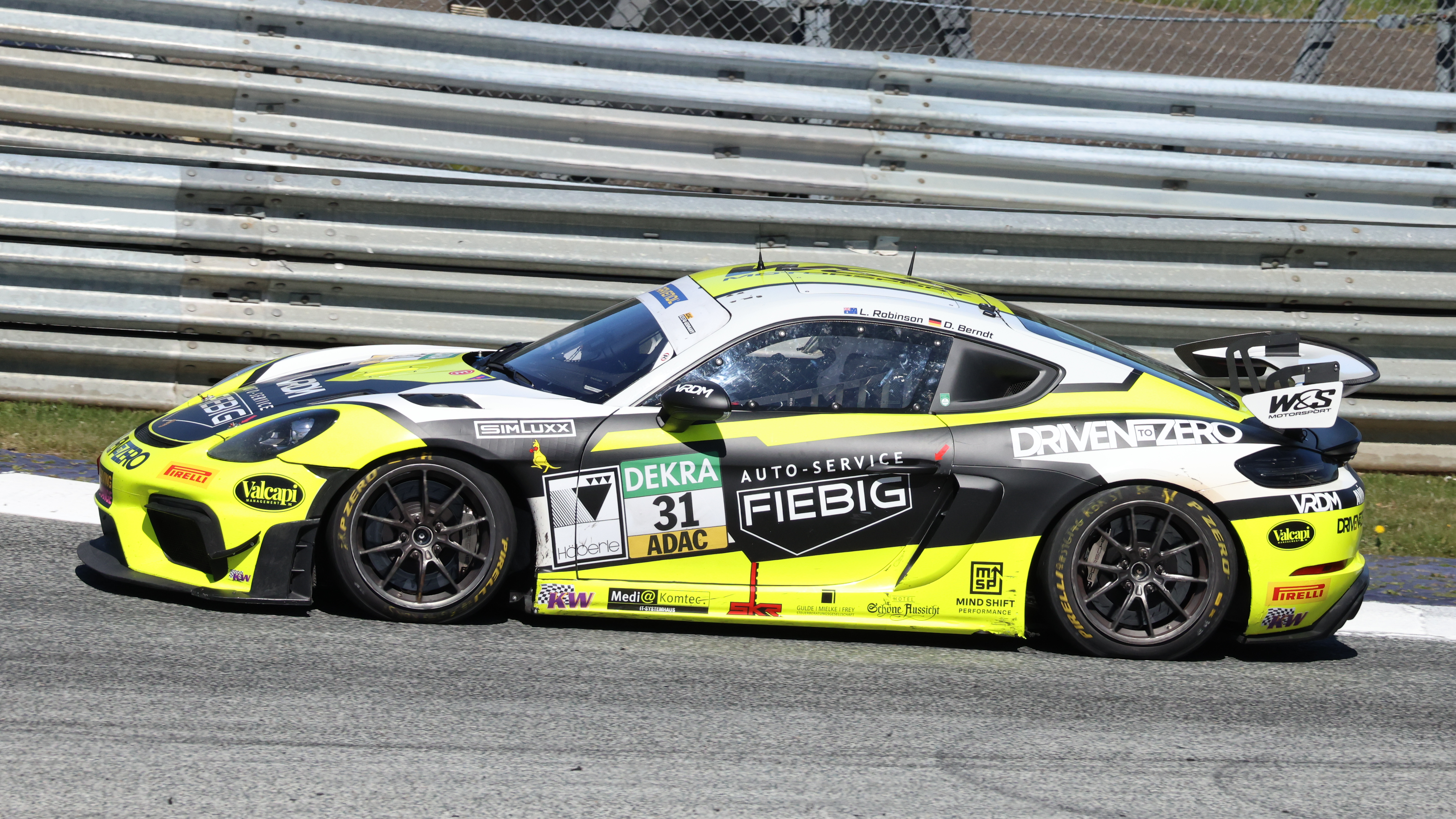
Denny Berndt and Lachlan Robinson won the overall Drivers' championship.

The 2026 ADAC GT4 Germany season was the eighth season of ADAC GT4 Germany, a sports car championship created and organised by the ADAC. The season started on 24 April at Red Bull Ring and finished on 11 October at the Hockenheimring.

== Teams and drivers ==
Team	Car	No.	Drivers	Class	Rounds
(Germany) COSY Racing by ESM	Aston Martin Vantage AMR GT4 Evo	4	(Germany) Philipp Gogollok	J	All
(Germany) COSY Racing by ESM	Aston Martin Vantage AMR GT4 Evo	4	(Germany) Jan Philipp Springob		All
(Germany) BWT Mücke Motorsport	Mercedes-AMG GT4	8	(United Kingdom) Alex Connor	J	All
(Germany) BWT Mücke Motorsport	Mercedes-AMG GT4	8	(Germany) Marius Schmid	J R	All
(Austria) Razoon - more than racing	Porsche 718 Cayman GT4 RS Clubsport 1 BMW M4 GT4 Evo (G82) 2-6	10	(Austria) Daniel Drexel		All
(Austria) Razoon - more than racing	Porsche 718 Cayman GT4 RS Clubsport 1 BMW M4 GT4 Evo (G82) 2-6	10	(United Kingdom) Hamish Forrest	J R	1
(Austria) Razoon - more than racing	Porsche 718 Cayman GT4 RS Clubsport 1 BMW M4 GT4 Evo (G82) 2-6	10	(Denmark) Simon Birch	J	2
(Austria) Razoon - more than racing	Porsche 718 Cayman GT4 RS Clubsport 1 BMW M4 GT4 Evo (G82) 2-6	10	(Germany) Michael Maniszewski		3–4, 6
(Austria) Razoon - more than racing	Porsche 718 Cayman GT4 RS Clubsport 1 BMW M4 GT4 Evo (G82) 2-6	10	(Canada) Damon Surzyshyn		5
(Austria) Razoon - more than racing	Porsche 718 Cayman GT4 RS Clubsport	20	(United Kingdom) Jack James	J R	1–3
(Austria) Razoon - more than racing	Porsche 718 Cayman GT4 RS Clubsport	20	(Austria) Harald Huber		1
(Austria) Razoon - more than racing	Porsche 718 Cayman GT4 RS Clubsport	20	(United Kingdom) Hamish Forrest	J R	2–4
(Austria) Razoon - more than racing	Porsche 718 Cayman GT4 RS Clubsport	20	(Germany) Gregor Schneider		4
(Austria) Razoon - more than racing	Porsche 718 Cayman GT4 RS Clubsport	20	(Canada) Damon Surzyshyn		6
(Austria) Razoon - more than racing	Porsche 718 Cayman GT4 RS Clubsport	20	(Germany) Denis Robin Wolf	J	6
(Austria) Razoon - more than racing	Porsche 718 Cayman GT4 RS Clubsport	40	(United Kingdom) Jack James	J R	4
(Austria) Razoon - more than racing	Porsche 718 Cayman GT4 RS Clubsport	40	(Canada) Damon Surzyshyn		4
(Germany) PROsport Racing	Mercedes-AMG GT4	26	(Germany) Marek Böckmann		1–5
(Germany) PROsport Racing	Mercedes-AMG GT4	26	(Germany) Roman Fellner-Feldegg	J	1–5
(Germany) AVIA W&S Motorsport	Porsche 718 Cayman GT4 RS Clubsport	30	(Israel) Alon Gabbay	J	All
(Germany) AVIA W&S Motorsport	Porsche 718 Cayman GT4 RS Clubsport	30	(Germany) Maximilian Schreyer	J	All
(Germany) AVIA W&S Motorsport	Porsche 718 Cayman GT4 RS Clubsport	31	(Germany) Denny Berndt	J	All
(Germany) AVIA W&S Motorsport	Porsche 718 Cayman GT4 RS Clubsport	31	(Australia) Lachlan Robinson	J	All
(Germany) AVIA W&S Motorsport	Porsche 718 Cayman GT4 RS Clubsport	32	(United States) Tim Horrell		All
(Germany) AVIA W&S Motorsport	Porsche 718 Cayman GT4 RS Clubsport	32	(Germany) Hendrik Still		All
(Germany) AVIA W&S Motorsport	Porsche 718 Cayman GT4 RS Clubsport	33	(Belgium) Nicolas Guillaume	J R	All
(Germany) AVIA W&S Motorsport	Porsche 718 Cayman GT4 RS Clubsport	33	(Denmark) Frederik Zebis	J R	All
(Germany) FK Performance Motorsport	BMW M4 GT4 Evo (G82)	49	(Germany) Luca Link	J	All
(Germany) FK Performance Motorsport	BMW M4 GT4 Evo (G82)	49	(Austria) Luis Moser	J	All
(Germany) FK Performance Motorsport	BMW M4 GT4 Evo (G82)	50	(Netherlands) Gianni van de Craats	J	All
(Germany) FK Performance Motorsport	BMW M4 GT4 Evo (G82)	50	(Denmark) Victor Nielsen	J	1–5
(Germany) FK Performance Motorsport	BMW M4 GT4 Evo (G82)	50	(Germany) Luis Beilicke	J	6
(Germany) FK Performance Motorsport	BMW M4 GT4 Evo (G82)	51	(Italy) Gabriele Piana		All
(Germany) FK Performance Motorsport	BMW M4 GT4 Evo (G82)	51	(Finland) Benjamin Sylvestersson	J	All
(Germany) ME Motorsport	BMW M4 GT4 Evo (G82)	66	(Germany) Leon Bauchmüller	J	All
(Germany) ME Motorsport	BMW M4 GT4 Evo (G82)	66	(Netherlands) Lukas Stiefelhagen	J R	All
(Germany) ME Motorsport	BMW M4 GT4 Evo (G82)	77	(Germany) Linus Hahne	J	All
(Germany) ME Motorsport	BMW M4 GT4 Evo (G82)	77	(Germany) Philip Wiskirchen	J	All
(Germany) CV Performance X JP Motorsport	Mercedes-AMG GT4	85	(Slovenia) Kyam Potez	J	All
(Germany) CV Performance X JP Motorsport	Mercedes-AMG GT4	85	(Sweden) Jonathan Engström	J	1–5
(Germany) CV Performance X JP Motorsport	Mercedes-AMG GT4	85	(Germany) Simon Connor Primm		6
(Belgium) CRT	Toyota GR Supra GT4 Evo2	87	(Belgium) Lucas Cartelle	J	All
(Belgium) CRT	Toyota GR Supra GT4 Evo2	87	(United States) Hudson Schwartz	J	All
(Austria) Wimmer Werk Motorsport	Porsche 718 Cayman GT4 RS Clubsport	91	(Denmark) Jesper Brunhøj Jensen		All
(Austria) Wimmer Werk Motorsport	Porsche 718 Cayman GT4 RS Clubsport	91	(Germany) Laurenz Rühl	J	All
(Austria) Wimmer Werk Motorsport	Porsche 718 Cayman GT4 RS Clubsport	92	(United Kingdom) Oskar Dix	J	All
(Austria) Wimmer Werk Motorsport	Porsche 718 Cayman GT4 RS Clubsport	92	(Germany) Egor Litvinenko	J	All
(Sweden) KRT Racing	Ginetta G56 GT4 Evo	97	(Sweden) Erik Bertilsson	R	All
(Sweden) KRT Racing	Ginetta G56 GT4 Evo	97	(Sweden) Alexzander Kristiansson		All

== Calendar ==
Round	Circuit	Date	Map of circuit locations	
1	Red Bull Ring, Spielberg, Austria	24–26 April	2026 ADAC GT4 Germany is located in Germany	2026 ADAC GT4 Germany is located in Austria
2	Norisring, Nuremberg, Germany	4–6 July	2026 ADAC GT4 Germany is located in Germany	2026 ADAC GT4 Germany is located in Austria
3	Motorsport Arena Oschersleben, Oschersleben, Germany	24–26 July	2026 ADAC GT4 Germany is located in Germany	2026 ADAC GT4 Germany is located in Austria
4	Nürburgring, Nürburg, Germany	14–16 August	2026 ADAC GT4 Germany is located in Germany	2026 ADAC GT4 Germany is located in Austria
5	Sachsenring, Hohenstein-Ernstthal, Germany	11–13 September	2026 ADAC GT4 Germany is located in Germany	2026 ADAC GT4 Germany is located in Austria
6	Hockenheimring, Hockenheim, Germany	9–11 October	2026 ADAC GT4 Germany is located in Germany	2026 ADAC GT4 Germany is located in Austria

== Race results ==
Round		Circuit	Date	Pole position	Fastest lap	Race winner
1	R1	(Austria) Red Bull Ring	25 April	(Germany) No. 31 AVIA W&S Motorsport	(Germany) No. 51 FK Performance Motorsport	(Germany) No. 51 FK Performance Motorsport
1	R1	(Austria) Red Bull Ring	25 April	(Germany) Denny Berndt (Australia) Lachlan Robinson	(Italy) Gabriele Piana	(Italy) Gabriele Piana (Finland) Benjamin Sylvestersson
1	R2	(Austria) Red Bull Ring	26 April	(Germany) No. 4 COSY Racing by ESM	(Germany) No. 51 FK Performance Motorsport	(Germany) No. 4 COSY Racing by ESM
1	R2	(Austria) Red Bull Ring	26 April	(Germany) Philipp Gogollok (Germany) Jan Philipp Springob	(Finland) Benjamin Sylvestersson	(Germany) Philipp Gogollok (Germany) Jan Philipp Springob
2	R1	(Germany) Norisring	5 July	(Germany) No. 31 AVIA W&S Motorsport	(Germany) No. 30 AVIA W&S Motorsport	(Germany) No. 31 AVIA W&S Motorsport
2	R1	(Germany) Norisring	5 July	(Germany) Denny Berndt (Australia) Lachlan Robinson	(Germany) Maximilian Schreyer	(Germany) Denny Berndt (Australia) Lachlan Robinson
2	R2	(Germany) Norisring	6 July	(Germany) No. 30 AVIA W&S Motorsport	(Germany) No. 31 AVIA W&S Motorsport	(Germany) No. 30 AVIA W&S Motorsport
2	R2	(Germany) Norisring	6 July	(Germany) Maximilian Schreyer (Israel) Alon Gabbay	(Germany) Denny Berndt	(Germany) Maximilian Schreyer (Israel) Alon Gabbay
3	R1	(Germany) Oschersleben	25 July	(Germany) No. 4 COSY Racing by ESM	(Germany) No. 4 COSY Racing by ESM	(Germany) No. 4 COSY Racing by ESM
3	R1	(Germany) Oschersleben	25 July	(Germany) Philipp Gogollok (Germany) Jan Philipp Springob	(Germany) Jan Philipp Springob	(Germany) Philipp Gogollok (Germany) Jan Philipp Springob
3	R2	(Germany) Oschersleben	26 July	(Belgium) No. 87 CRT	(Belgium) No. 87 CRT	(Belgium) No. 87 CRT
3	R2	(Germany) Oschersleben	26 July	(United States) Hudson Schwartz (Belgium) Lucas Cartelle	(Belgium) Lucas Cartelle	(United States) Hudson Schwartz (Belgium) Lucas Cartelle
4	R1	(Germany) Nürburgring	15 August	(Germany) No. 4 COSY Racing by ESM	(Germany) No. 51 FK Performance Motorsport	(Germany) No. 4 COSY Racing by ESM
4	R1	(Germany) Nürburgring	15 August	(Germany) Philipp Gogollok (Germany) Jan Philipp Springob	(Italy) Gabriele Piana	(Germany) Philipp Gogollok (Germany) Jan Philipp Springob
4	R2	(Germany) Nürburgring	16 August	(Germany) No. 4 COSY Racing by ESM	(Germany) No. 31 AVIA W&S Motorsport	(Germany) No. 31 AVIA W&S Motorsport
4	R2	(Germany) Nürburgring	16 August	(Germany) Philipp Gogollok (Germany) Jan Philipp Springob	(Germany) Denny Berndt	(Germany) Denny Berndt (Australia) Lachlan Robinson
5	R1	(Germany) Sachsenring	12 September	(Germany) No. 51 FK Performance Motorsport	(Germany) No. 50 FK Performance Motorsport	(Germany) No. 51 FK Performance Motorsport
5	R1	(Germany) Sachsenring	12 September	(Italy) Gabriele Piana (Finland) Benjamin Sylvestersson	(Denmark) Victor Nielsen	(Italy) Gabriele Piana (Finland) Benjamin Sylvestersson
5	R2	(Germany) Sachsenring	13 September	(Germany) No. 31 AVIA W&S Motorsport	The race was cancelled due to safety concerns and was later rescheduled to 10 October.	
5	R2	(Germany) Sachsenring	13 September	(Germany) Denny Berndt (Australia) Lachlan Robinson	The race was cancelled due to safety concerns and was later rescheduled to 10 October.	
6	R1	(Germany) Hockenheim	10 October	(Belgium) No. 87 CRT	(Belgium) No. 87 CRT	(Germany) No. 51 FK Performance Motorsport
6	R1	(Germany) Hockenheim	10 October	(United States) Hudson Schwartz (Belgium) Lucas Cartelle	(Belgium) Lucas Cartelle	(Italy) Gabriele Piana (Finland) Benjamin Sylvestersson
6	R2	(Germany) Hockenheim	10 October	(Germany) No. 30 AVIA W&S Motorsport	(Germany) No. 31 AVIA W&S Motorsport	(Germany) No. 31 AVIA W&S Motorsport
6	R2	(Germany) Hockenheim	10 October	(Germany) Maximilian Schreyer (Israel) Alon Gabbay	(Germany) Denny Berndt	(Germany) Denny Berndt (Australia) Lachlan Robinson
6	R3	(Germany) Hockenheim	11 October	(Germany) No. 51 FK Performance Motorsport	(Germany) No. 51 FK Performance Motorsport	(Germany) No. 4 COSY Racing by ESM
6	R3	(Germany) Hockenheim	11 October	(Italy) Gabriele Piana (Finland) Benjamin Sylvestersson	(Italy) Gabriele Piana	(Germany) Philipp Gogollok (Germany) Jan Philipp Springob

== Standings ==
=== Points system ===
Scoring system

Championship points are awarded for the first fifteen positions in each race. Entries are required to complete 75% of the winning car's race distance in order to be classified and earn points. Individual drivers are required to participate for a minimum of 25 minutes in order to earn championship points in any race.

Position	**1st**	**2nd**	**3rd**	**4th**	**5th**	**6th**	**7th**	**8th**	**9th**	**10th**	**11th**	**12th**	**13th**	**14th**	**15th**
Points	25	20	16	13	11	10	9	8	7	6	5	4	3	2	1

=== Drivers' Standings ===
Pos.	Driver	RBR (Austria)		NOR (Germany)		OSC (Germany)		NÜR (Germany)		SAC (Germany)		HOC (Germany)			Points
Pos.	Driver	R1	R2	R1	R2	R1	R2	R1	R2	R1	R2	R1	R2	R3	Points
1	(Australia) Lachlan Robinson (Germany) Denny Berndt	**2**	3	**1**	2	7	6	6	1	3	**C**	8	1	2	204
2	(Italy) Gabriele Piana (Finland) Benjamin Sylvestersson	1	2	9	4	3	2	Ret	2	**1**	C	1	3	**4**	200
3	(Germany) Philipp Gogollok (Germany) Jan Philipp Springob	10	**1**	8	5	**1**	3	**1**	**4**	2	C	Ret	4	1	185
4	(Germany) Maximilian Schreyer (Israel) Alon Gabbay	3	5	2	**1**	10	10	8	3	15	C	2	**2**	3	165
5	(Belgium) Lucas Cartelle (United States) Hudson Schwartz	4	Ret	3	3	4	**1**	5	6	6	C	**Ret**	Ret	7	123
6	(Germany) Linus Hahne (Germany) Phillip Wiskirchen	11	6	6	6	6	4	2	Ret	4	C	3	6	10	123
7	(Germany) Luca Link (Austria) Luis Moser	5	4	4	7	8	19	3	5	5	C	Ret	12	16	96
8	(Germany) Marek Böckmann (Germany) Roman Fellner-Feldegg	7	8	5	10	2	5	10	7	8	C				88
9	(Netherlands) Lukas Stiefelhagen (Germany) Leon Bauchmüller	6	Ret	11	9	9	7	9	11	9	C	6	4	Ret	81
10	(Netherlands) Gianni van de Craats	Ret	7	7	16	12	8	12	10	10	C	9	Ret	8	61
11	(Germany) Hendrik Still (United States) Tim Horrell	8	10	Ret	8	16	9	13	17	12	C	11	8	6	59
12	(Germany) Marius Schmid (United Kingdom) Alex Connor	9	9	10	11	5	17	7	8	17	C	Ret	WD	12	57
13	(Denmark) Frederic Zebis (Belgium) Nicolas Guillaume	15	11	17	Ret	11	12	Ret	13	13	C	4	7	5	54
14	(Denmark) Victor Nielsen	Ret	7	7	16	12	8	12	10	10	C				46
15	(Germany) Egor Litvinenko (United Kingdom) Oskar Dix	14	DSQ	14	17	Ret	11	11	9	14	C	10	9	9	43
16	(Sweden) Alexzander Kristiansson (Sweden) Erik Bertilsson	Ret	12	18	Ret	Ret	14	4	Ret	7	C	6	Ret	13	40
17	(Slovenia) Kyam Potez	12	13	13	13	15	15	Ret	12	11	C	7	Ret	11	39
18	(Sweden) Jonathan Engström	12	13	13	13	15	15	Ret	12	11	C				25
19	(Austria) Daniel Drexel	13	15	12	12	13	18	14	16	16	C	13	13	15	18
20	(Denmark) Jesper Brunhoj Jensen (Germany) Laurenz Rühl	Ret	14	16	15	Ret	16	17	14	Ret	C	12	10	14	17
21	(Germany) Luis Beilicke											9	Ret	8	15
22	(Germany) Simon Connor Primm											7	Ret	11	14
23	(Germany) Michael Maniszewski					13	18	14	16			13	13	15	13
24	(United Kingdom) Hamish Forrest	13	15	15	14	14	13	16	Ret						13
25	(Denmark) Simon Birch			12	12										8
26	(United Kingdom) Jack James	Ret	16	15	14	14	13	15	15						8
27	(Canada) Damon Surzyshyn							15	15	16	C	14	11	Ret	7
28	(Germany) Denis Robin Wolf											14	11	Ret	7
29	(Germany) Gregor Schneider							16	Ret						1
30	(Austria) Harald Huber	Ret	16												0
Pos.	Driver	R1	R2	R1	R2	R1	R2	R1	R2	R1	R2	R1	R2	R3	Points
Pos.	Driver	RBR (Austria)		NOR (Germany)		OSC (Germany)		NÜR (Germany)		SAC (Germany)		HOC (Germany)			Points

Colour	Result
Gold	Winner
Silver	Second place
Bronze	Third place
Green	Points classification
Blue	Non-points classification
Blue	Non-classified finish (NC)
Purple	Retired, not classified (Ret)
Red	Did not qualify (DNQ)
Red	Did not pre-qualify (DNPQ)
Black	Disqualified (DSQ)
White	Did not start (DNS)
White	Withdrew (WD)
White	Race cancelled (C)
Blank	Did not practice (DNP)
Blank	Did not arrive (DNA)
Blank	Excluded (EX)

**Bold** – Pole

Italics – Fastest Lap
