= 2025 GT4 European Series =

Eighteenth season of the GT4 European Series

The 2025 GT4 European Series Powered by RAFA Racing Club was the 18th season of the GT4 European Series organised by the SRO Motorsports Group. The races were contested with GT4-spec cars. The season started on 11 April at Circuit Paul Ricard and finished on 12 October at the Circuit de Barcelona-Catalunya.

== Calendar ==
The Calendar for the 2025 season was unveiled on 28 July 2024 during the 2024 24 Hours of Spa. All 6 race weekends in support of the 2025 GT World Challenge Europe.

Round	Circuit	Date	Supporting
1	Circuit Paul Ricard, Le Castellet, France	11–13 April	GT World Challenge Europe Endurance Cup
2	Circuit Zandvoort, Zandvoort, Netherlands	16–18 May	GT World Challenge Europe Sprint Cup
3	Circuit de Spa-Francorchamps, Stavelot, Belgium	26–29 June	Intercontinental GT Challenge; GT World Challenge Europe Endurance Cup
4	Misano World Circuit, Misano, Italy	18–20 July	GT World Challenge Europe Sprint Cup
5	Nürburgring, Nürburg, Germany	29–31 August	GT World Challenge Europe Endurance Cup
6	Circuit de Barcelona-Catalunya, Montmeló, Spain	10–12 October	GT World Challenge Europe Endurance Cup

== Entries ==
Team	Car	Engine	No.	Drivers	Class	Rounds
(Belgium) TeamFloral	Ford Mustang GT4 (2024)	Ford Coyote 5.0 L V8	1	(Belgium) Michiel Haverans	S	All
(Belgium) TeamFloral	Ford Mustang GT4 (2024)	Ford Coyote 5.0 L V8	1	(Belgium) Nathan Vanspringel	S	All
(Sweden) Nova Racing	Porsche 718 Cayman GT4 RS Clubsport	Porsche MDG 4.0 L Flat-6	2	(Sweden) Edvin Hellsten	PA	2, 4–6
(Sweden) Nova Racing	Porsche 718 Cayman GT4 RS Clubsport	Porsche MDG 4.0 L Flat-6	2	(Sweden) Daniel Nilsson	PA	2, 4–6
(France) Team Speedcar	Audi R8 LMS GT4 Evo	Audi DAR 5.2 L V10	3	(France) Robert Consani	S	All
(France) Team Speedcar	Audi R8 LMS GT4 Evo	Audi DAR 5.2 L V10	3	(France) Benjamin Lariche	S	All
(France) Team Speedcar	Audi R8 LMS GT4 Evo	Audi DAR 5.2 L V10	8	(France) Grégory Guilvert	S	All
(France) Team Speedcar	Audi R8 LMS GT4 Evo	Audi DAR 5.2 L V10	8	(France) Paul Petit	S	All
(France) Team Speedcar	Audi R8 LMS GT4 Evo	Audi DAR 5.2 L V10	44	(France) Julien Ripert	Am	All
(France) Team Speedcar	Audi R8 LMS GT4 Evo	Audi DAR 5.2 L V10	44	(France) Philippe Thalamy	Am	All
(Spain) Mirage Racing	Aston Martin Vantage AMR GT4 Evo	Mercedes-Benz M177 4.0 L Twin-Turbo V8	5	(Brazil) Roberto Faria	S	All
(Spain) Mirage Racing	Aston Martin Vantage AMR GT4 Evo	Mercedes-Benz M177 4.0 L Twin-Turbo V8	5	(Netherlands) Ruben del Sarte	S	All
(Spain) Mirage Racing	Aston Martin Vantage AMR GT4 Evo	Mercedes-Benz M177 4.0 L Twin-Turbo V8	7	Stanislav Safronov (Note: Loboda, Safronov, Sorokin and Vaintrub are Russian, but are competing as a neutral competitor as Russian national emblems were banned by the FIA due to the Russian invasion of Ukraine.)	PA	All
(Spain) Mirage Racing	Aston Martin Vantage AMR GT4 Evo	Mercedes-Benz M177 4.0 L Twin-Turbo V8	7	Aleksandr Vaintrub	PA	All
(France) CMR	Ginetta G56 GT4	GM LS3 6.2 L V8	10	(France) Ethan Gialdini	S	1–3
(France) CMR	Ginetta G56 GT4	GM LS3 6.2 L V8	10	(Netherlands) Senna van Walstijn	S	1
(France) CMR	Ginetta G56 GT4	GM LS3 6.2 L V8	10	(France) Nicolas Ciamin	S	2
(France) CMR	Ginetta G56 GT4	GM LS3 6.2 L V8	10	(United Kingdom) Mike Simpson	S	3
(France) CMR	Ginetta G56 GT4	GM LS3 6.2 L V8	51	(France) Hugo Mogica	PA	All
(France) CMR	Ginetta G56 GT4	GM LS3 6.2 L V8	51	(France) Thibaut Mogica	PA	All
(Turkey) Borusan Otomotiv Motorsport	BMW M4 GT4 Evo (G82)	BMW S58B30T0 3.0 L Twin-Turbo I6	11	(Brazil) Pedro Ebrahim	S	All
(Turkey) Borusan Otomotiv Motorsport	BMW M4 GT4 Evo (G82)	BMW S58B30T0 3.0 L Twin-Turbo I6	11	(Turkey) Yagiz Gedik	S	All
(Turkey) Borusan Otomotiv Motorsport	BMW M4 GT4 Evo (G82)	BMW S58B30T0 3.0 L Twin-Turbo I6	12	(Turkey) Berkay Besler	S	All
(Turkey) Borusan Otomotiv Motorsport	BMW M4 GT4 Evo (G82)	BMW S58B30T0 3.0 L Twin-Turbo I6	12	(Italy) Gabriele Piana	S	All
(Spain) NM Racing Team	Mercedes-AMG GT4	Mercedes-Benz M178 4.0 L Twin-Turbo V8	15	(Spain) Lluc Ibáñez	S	All
(Spain) NM Racing Team	Mercedes-AMG GT4	Mercedes-Benz M178 4.0 L Twin-Turbo V8	15	(United States) Alexandre Papadopulos	S	All
(Spain) NM Racing Team	Mercedes-AMG GT4	Mercedes-Benz M178 4.0 L Twin-Turbo V8	16	(United States) Andy Cantu	PA	1–2
(Spain) NM Racing Team	Mercedes-AMG GT4	Mercedes-Benz M178 4.0 L Twin-Turbo V8	16	(Portugal) Miguel Cristóvão	PA	1–2
(Spain) NM Racing Team	Mercedes-AMG GT4	Mercedes-Benz M178 4.0 L Twin-Turbo V8	16	(Spain) Marc de Fulgencio	PA	5–6
(Spain) NM Racing Team	Mercedes-AMG GT4	Mercedes-Benz M178 4.0 L Twin-Turbo V8	16	(United Kingdom) Branden Lee Oxley	PA	5–6
(Spain) NM Racing Team	Mercedes-AMG GT4	Mercedes-Benz M178 4.0 L Twin-Turbo V8	16	(United Kingdom) Matthew Higgins	PA	3
(Spain) NM Racing Team	Mercedes-AMG GT4	Mercedes-Benz M178 4.0 L Twin-Turbo V8	16	(United Kingdom) Pierre Livingstone	PA	3
(Spain) NM Racing Team	Mercedes-AMG GT4	Mercedes-Benz M178 4.0 L Twin-Turbo V8	88	(United States) Keith Gatehouse	Am	All
(Spain) NM Racing Team	Mercedes-AMG GT4	Mercedes-Benz M178 4.0 L Twin-Turbo V8	88	Igor Sorokin	Am	All
(France) L'Espace Bienvenue	BMW M4 GT4 Evo (G82)	BMW S58B30T0 3.0 L Twin-Turbo I6	17	(Netherlands) Ricardo van der Ende	S	All
(France) L'Espace Bienvenue	BMW M4 GT4 Evo (G82)	BMW S58B30T0 3.0 L Twin-Turbo I6	17	(Belgium) Benjamin Lessennes	S	All
(Slovenia) Lema Racing x Mapetrol	Mercedes-AMG GT4	Mercedes-Benz M178 4.0 L Twin-Turbo V8	19	(Slovenia) Mark Kastelic	S	All
(Slovenia) Lema Racing x Mapetrol	Mercedes-AMG GT4	Mercedes-Benz M178 4.0 L Twin-Turbo V8	19	(Finland) Elias Niskanen	S	All
(France) Chazel Technologie Course	BMW M4 GT4 Evo (G82)	BMW S58B30T0 3.0 L Twin-Turbo I6	20	(Belgium) Lucas Cartelle	PA	1–5
(France) Chazel Technologie Course	BMW M4 GT4 Evo (G82)	BMW S58B30T0 3.0 L Twin-Turbo I6	20	(France) Lucas Sugliano	PA	1–5
(France) Chazel Technologie Course	BMW M4 GT4 Evo (G82)	BMW S58B30T0 3.0 L Twin-Turbo I6	317	(France) Antoni de Barn	Am	All
(France) Chazel Technologie Course	BMW M4 GT4 Evo (G82)	BMW S58B30T0 3.0 L Twin-Turbo I6	317	(France) Jean-Mathieu Leandri	Am	All
(France) JSB Compétition	Porsche 718 Cayman GT4 RS Clubsport	Porsche MDG 4.0 L Flat-6	24	(France) Viny Beltramelli	PA	All
(France) JSB Compétition	Porsche 718 Cayman GT4 RS Clubsport	Porsche MDG 4.0 L Flat-6	24	(France) Nicco Ferrarin	PA	All
(Portugal) Speedy Motorsport	Toyota GR Supra GT4 Evo2	BMW B58B30 3.0 L Twin-Turbo I6	25	(Portugal) Tomàs Guedes	PA	6
(Portugal) Speedy Motorsport	Toyota GR Supra GT4 Evo2	BMW B58B30 3.0 L Twin-Turbo I6	25	(Portugal) Jose Carlos Pires	PA	6
(Portugal) Speedy Motorsport	Toyota GR Supra GT4 Evo2	BMW B58B30 3.0 L Twin-Turbo I6	26	(Spain) Javier Sagrera	S	6
(Portugal) Speedy Motorsport	Toyota GR Supra GT4 Evo2	BMW B58B30 3.0 L Twin-Turbo I6	26	(United States) Hudson Schwartz	S	6
(France) AV Racing	Porsche 718 Cayman GT4 RS Clubsport	Porsche MDG 4.0 L Flat-6	27	(Belgium) Mathieu Detry	PA	1–3
(France) AV Racing	Porsche 718 Cayman GT4 RS Clubsport	Porsche MDG 4.0 L Flat-6	27	(Belgium) Fabian Duffieux	PA	1–3
(France) AV Racing	Porsche 718 Cayman GT4 RS Clubsport	Porsche MDG 4.0 L Flat-6	27	(Spain) Maximilien Huber	PA	6
(France) AV Racing	Porsche 718 Cayman GT4 RS Clubsport	Porsche MDG 4.0 L Flat-6	27	(Belgium) Arthur Rasse	PA	6
(France) AV Racing	Porsche 718 Cayman GT4 RS Clubsport	Porsche MDG 4.0 L Flat-6	27	(Belgium) Lorenzo Donniacuo	Am	4
(France) AV Racing	Porsche 718 Cayman GT4 RS Clubsport	Porsche MDG 4.0 L Flat-6	27	(Belgium) Alessandro Tudisca	Am	4
(France) AV Racing	Porsche 718 Cayman GT4 RS Clubsport	Porsche MDG 4.0 L Flat-6	27	(Spain) Maximilien Huber	Am	5
(France) AV Racing	Porsche 718 Cayman GT4 RS Clubsport	Porsche MDG 4.0 L Flat-6	27	(France) Romain Vozniak	Am	5
(France) AV Racing	Porsche 718 Cayman GT4 RS Clubsport	Porsche MDG 4.0 L Flat-6	28	(India) Ajith Kumar	Am	All
(France) AV Racing	Porsche 718 Cayman GT4 RS Clubsport	Porsche MDG 4.0 L Flat-6	28	(France) Romain Vozniak	Am	6
(France) AV Racing	Porsche 718 Cayman GT4 RS Clubsport	Porsche MDG 4.0 L Flat-6	128	(Belgium) Frédéric Caprasse	S	1–3
(France) AV Racing	Porsche 718 Cayman GT4 RS Clubsport	Porsche MDG 4.0 L Flat-6	128	(France) Mattéo Nomblot	S	1–3
(Germany) W&S Motorsport	Porsche 718 Cayman GT4 RS Clubsport	Porsche MDG 4.0 L Flat-6	30	(Germany) Daniel Blickle	Am	All
(Germany) W&S Motorsport	Porsche 718 Cayman GT4 RS Clubsport	Porsche MDG 4.0 L Flat-6	30	(Germany) Max Kronberg	Am	All
(Germany) W&S Motorsport	Porsche 718 Cayman GT4 RS Clubsport	Porsche MDG 4.0 L Flat-6	31	(Israel) Guy Albag	S	1–2
(Germany) W&S Motorsport	Porsche 718 Cayman GT4 RS Clubsport	Porsche MDG 4.0 L Flat-6	31	(Israel) Alon Gabbay	S	1–2
(Germany) W&S Motorsport	Porsche 718 Cayman GT4 RS Clubsport	Porsche MDG 4.0 L Flat-6	31	(United States) Ismaeel Ellahi	Am	6
(Germany) W&S Motorsport	Porsche 718 Cayman GT4 RS Clubsport	Porsche MDG 4.0 L Flat-6	31	(United States) Tim Horrell	Am	6
(Germany) W&S Motorsport	Porsche 718 Cayman GT4 RS Clubsport	Porsche MDG 4.0 L Flat-6	32	(Germany) Joachim Bölting	PA	All
(Germany) W&S Motorsport	Porsche 718 Cayman GT4 RS Clubsport	Porsche MDG 4.0 L Flat-6	32	(Germany) Hendrik Still	PA	All
(Switzerland) Racing Spirit of Léman	Aston Martin Vantage AMR GT4 Evo	Mercedes-Benz M177 4.0 L Twin-Turbo V8	39	(France) Baudouin Detout	S	All
(Switzerland) Racing Spirit of Léman	Aston Martin Vantage AMR GT4 Evo	Mercedes-Benz M177 4.0 L Twin-Turbo V8	39	(Luxembourg) Clément Seyler	S	All
(Switzerland) Racing Spirit of Léman	Aston Martin Vantage AMR GT4 Evo	Mercedes-Benz M177 4.0 L Twin-Turbo V8	74	(Switzerland) David Kullmann	S	All
(Switzerland) Racing Spirit of Léman	Aston Martin Vantage AMR GT4 Evo	Mercedes-Benz M177 4.0 L Twin-Turbo V8	74	(United Kingdom) Will Orton	S	All
(United States) Nolasport	Porsche 718 Cayman GT4 RS Clubsport	Porsche MDG 4.0 L Flat-6	47	(United States) Jason Hart	PA	3
(United States) Nolasport	Porsche 718 Cayman GT4 RS Clubsport	Porsche MDG 4.0 L Flat-6	47	(United States) Matt Travis	PA	3
(San Marino) W&D Racing Team	BMW M4 GT4 Evo (G82)	BMW S58B30T0 3.0 L Twin-Turbo I6	48	(San Marino) Davide Meloni	PA	All
(San Marino) W&D Racing Team	BMW M4 GT4 Evo (G82)	BMW S58B30T0 3.0 L Twin-Turbo I6	48	(San Marino) Paolo Meloni	PA	All
(Italy) Lotus PB Racing	Lotus Emira GT4	Toyota 2GR-FE 3.6 L V6	54	(Italy) Stefano d'Aste	PA	All
(Italy) Lotus PB Racing	Lotus Emira GT4	Toyota 2GR-FE 3.6 L V6	54	(Italy) Alberto Naska	PA	All
Toyota Gazoo Racing Sweden	Toyota GR Supra GT4 Evo2	BMW B58B30 3.0 L Twin-Turbo I6	55	(Sweden) Christoffer Brunnhagen	Am	All
Toyota Gazoo Racing Sweden	Toyota GR Supra GT4 Evo2	BMW B58B30 3.0 L Twin-Turbo I6	55	(Sweden) Mikael Brunnhagen	Am	All
Toyota Gazoo Racing Sweden	Toyota GR Supra GT4 Evo2	BMW B58B30 3.0 L Twin-Turbo I6	90	(Sweden) Hans Holmund	Am	2, 5
Toyota Gazoo Racing Sweden	Toyota GR Supra GT4 Evo2	BMW B58B30 3.0 L Twin-Turbo I6	90	(Sweden) Hans Holmund	PA	3
Toyota Gazoo Racing Sweden	Toyota GR Supra GT4 Evo2	BMW B58B30 3.0 L Twin-Turbo I6	90	(Sweden) Emil Skärås	PA	3
(Austria) Razoon - more than racing	Porsche 718 Cayman GT4 RS Clubsport	Porsche MDG 4.0 L Flat-6	60	(Switzerland) Gustavo Xavier	S	1–2
(Austria) Razoon - more than racing	Porsche 718 Cayman GT4 RS Clubsport	Porsche MDG 4.0 L Flat-6	60	(Austria) Daniel Drexel	S	1–2
(Austria) Razoon - more than racing	Porsche 718 Cayman GT4 RS Clubsport	Porsche MDG 4.0 L Flat-6	60	(Switzerland) Gustavo Xavier	PA	3–6
(Austria) Razoon - more than racing	Porsche 718 Cayman GT4 RS Clubsport	Porsche MDG 4.0 L Flat-6	60	(Turkey) Önder Erdem	PA	3–6
(Austria) Razoon - more than racing	Porsche 718 Cayman GT4 RS Clubsport	Porsche MDG 4.0 L Flat-6	70	(Germany) Danny Berndt	PA	3
(Austria) Razoon - more than racing	Porsche 718 Cayman GT4 RS Clubsport	Porsche MDG 4.0 L Flat-6	70	(Austria) Richard Wolf	PA	3
(United Kingdom) Academy Motorsport	Ford Mustang GT4 (2024)	Ford Coyote 5.0 L V8	61	(United States) Erik Evans	S	All
(United Kingdom) Academy Motorsport	Ford Mustang GT4 (2024)	Ford Coyote 5.0 L V8	61	(Canada) Marco Signoretti	S	All
(France) Vic'Team	Mercedes AMG GT4	Mercedes-Benz M178 4.0 L Twin-Turbo V8	64	(France) Olivier Jouffret	PA	1
(France) Vic'Team	Mercedes AMG GT4	Mercedes-Benz M178 4.0 L Twin-Turbo V8	64	(France) Eric Tremoulet	PA	1
(United Kingdom) Elite Motorsport with Entire Race Engineering	McLaren Artura GT4	McLaren M630 3.0 L Turbo V6	77	(Saudi Arabia) Ali Juffali	Am	6
(United Kingdom) Elite Motorsport with Entire Race Engineering	McLaren Artura GT4	McLaren M630 3.0 L Turbo V6	77	(Saudi Arabia) Reema Juffali	Am	6
(United Kingdom) Elite Motorsport with Entire Race Engineering	McLaren Artura GT4	McLaren M630 3.0 L Turbo V6	78	(United Kingdom) McKenzy Cresswell	S	All
(United Kingdom) Elite Motorsport with Entire Race Engineering	McLaren Artura GT4	McLaren M630 3.0 L Turbo V6	78	(United Kingdom) Josh Rattican	S	All
(United States) RAFA Racing by Race Lab	McLaren Artura GT4	McLaren M630 3.0 L Turbo V6	81	(Denmark) Julius Dinesen	S	1–4
(United States) RAFA Racing by Race Lab	McLaren Artura GT4	McLaren M630 3.0 L Turbo V6	81	(United Kingdom) Aston Millar	S	1–3
(United States) RAFA Racing by Race Lab	McLaren Artura GT4	McLaren M630 3.0 L Turbo V6	81	(United Kingdom) Zac Meakin	S	4
(United States) RAFA Racing by Race Lab	McLaren Artura GT4	McLaren M630 3.0 L Turbo V6	812	(United Kingdom) Charlie Hart	S	All
(United States) RAFA Racing by Race Lab	McLaren Artura GT4	McLaren M630 3.0 L Turbo V6	812	(United Kingdom) Callum Davies	S	All
(France) Matmut Évolution	Toyota GR Supra GT4 Evo2	BMW B58B30 3.0 L Twin-Turbo I6	87	(France) Hadrien David	S	All
(France) Matmut Évolution	Toyota GR Supra GT4 Evo2	BMW B58B30 3.0 L Twin-Turbo I6	87	(Spain) Jan Duran	S	All
(France) Matmut Évolution	Toyota GR Supra GT4 Evo2	BMW B58B30 3.0 L Twin-Turbo I6	99	(France) Cindy Gudet	PA	All
(France) Matmut Évolution	Toyota GR Supra GT4 Evo2	BMW B58B30 3.0 L Twin-Turbo I6	99	(Czech Republic) Gabriela Jílková	PA	All
(United Arab Emirates) Continental Racing by Simpson Motorsport	BMW M4 GT4 Evo (G82)	BMW S58B30T0 3.0 L Twin-Turbo I6	96	Mikhail Loboda	PA	All
(United Arab Emirates) Continental Racing by Simpson Motorsport	BMW M4 GT4 Evo (G82)	BMW S58B30T0 3.0 L Twin-Turbo I6	96	(United Arab Emirates) Vasily Vladykin	PA	All
(Germany) Schubert Motorsport	BMW M4 GT4 Evo (G82)	BMW S58B30T0 3.0 L Twin-Turbo I6	97	(Sweden) Stefan Nilsson	Am	All
(Germany) Schubert Motorsport	BMW M4 GT4 Evo (G82)	BMW S58B30T0 3.0 L Twin-Turbo I6	97	(Sweden) Mats Olsson	Am	All
(Germany) Schubert Motorsport	BMW M4 GT4 Evo (G82)	BMW S58B30T0 3.0 L Twin-Turbo I6	98	(Sweden) Victor Bouveng	PA	All
(Germany) Schubert Motorsport	BMW M4 GT4 Evo (G82)	BMW S58B30T0 3.0 L Twin-Turbo I6	98	(Sweden) Joakim Walde	PA	All
(Netherlands) JW Raceservice	Porsche 718 Cayman GT4 RS Clubsport	Porsche MDG 4.0 L Flat-6	259	(Netherlands) Jurriaan de Back	S	1–5
(Netherlands) JW Raceservice	Porsche 718 Cayman GT4 RS Clubsport	Porsche MDG 4.0 L Flat-6	259	(Netherlands) Bas Visser	S	1–5
(Netherlands) JW Raceservice	Porsche 718 Cayman GT4 RS Clubsport	Porsche MDG 4.0 L Flat-6	259	(Netherlands) Rutger Brakel	PA	6
(Netherlands) JW Raceservice	Porsche 718 Cayman GT4 RS Clubsport	Porsche MDG 4.0 L Flat-6	259	(Netherlands) Bas Visser	PA	6
(Romania) Willi Motorsport	BMW M4 GT4 Evo (G82)	BMW S58B30T0 3.0 L Twin-Turbo I6	310	(Romania) Sergiu Nicolae	S	1–5
(Romania) Willi Motorsport	BMW M4 GT4 Evo (G82)	BMW S58B30T0 3.0 L Twin-Turbo I6	310	(Romania) Tudor Tudurachi	S	1–5
(Romania) Willi Motorsport	Audi R8 LMS GT4 Evo	Audi DAR 5.2 L V10	310	(Romania) Sergiu Nicolae	S	6
(Romania) Willi Motorsport	Audi R8 LMS GT4 Evo	Audi DAR 5.2 L V10	310	(Romania) Tudor Tudurachi	S	6
(Germany) Seyffarth Motorsport	Audi R8 LMS GT4 Evo	Audi DAR 5.2 L V10	427	(Germany) Tobias Erdmann	Am	3
(Germany) Seyffarth Motorsport	Audi R8 LMS GT4 Evo	Audi DAR 5.2 L V10	427	(Germany) Bernd Schaible	Am	3

Icon	Class
S	Silver Cup
PA	Pro-Am Cup
Am	Am Cup

== Results and standings ==
=== Race results ===
Bold indicates overall winner.

Round		Circuit	Pole position	Silver Winners	Pro-Am Winners	Am Winners
1	R1	(France) Paul Ricard	(Germany) No. 32 W&S Motorsport	**(United Kingdom) No. 61 Academy Motorsport**	(France) No. 24 JSB Compétition	(France) No. 317 Chazel Technologie Course
1	R1	(France) Paul Ricard	(Germany) Joachim Bölting (Germany) Hendrik Still	**(United States) Erik Evans** **(Canada) Marco Signoretti**	(France) Viny Beltramelli (France) Nicco Ferrarin	(France) Antoni de Barn (France) Jean-Mathieu Leandri
1	R2	(France) Paul Ricard	(France) No. 8 Team Speedcar	**(France) No. 3 Team Speedcar**	(Germany) No. 32 W&S Motorsport	(France) No. 317 Chazel Technologie Course
1	R2	(France) Paul Ricard	(France) Grégory Guilvert (France) Paul Petit	**(France) Robert Consani** **(France) Benjamin Lariche**	(Germany) Joachim Bölting (Germany) Hendrik Still	(France) Antoni de Barn (France) Jean-Mathieu Leandri
2	R1	(Netherlands) Zandvoort	(France) No. 8 Team Speedcar	**(United Kingdom) No. 61 Academy Motorsport**	(Germany) No. 32 W&S Motorsport	(Germany) No. 30 W&S Motorsport
2	R1	(Netherlands) Zandvoort	(France) Grégory Guilvert (France) Paul Petit	**(United States) Erik Evans** **(Canada) Marco Signoretti**	(Germany) Joachim Bölting (Germany) Hendrik Still	(Germany) Daniel Bllickle (Germany) Max Kronberg
2	R2	(Netherlands) Zandvoort	**(France)** No. 3 Team Speedcar	**(France) No. 3 Team Speedcar**	(Germany) No. 32 W&S Motorsport	(France) No. 317 Chazel Technologie Course
2	R2	(Netherlands) Zandvoort	(France) Robert Consani (France) Benjamin Lariche	**(France) Robert Consani** **(France) Benjamin Lariche**	(Germany) Joachim Bölting (Germany) Hendrik Still	(France) Antoni de Barn (France) Jean-Mathieu Leandri
3	R1	(Belgium) Spa	(United Kingdom) No. 78 Elite Motorsport With Entire Race Engineering	**(France) No. 8 Team Speedcar**	(Germany) No. 32 W&S Motorsport	(Germany) No. 30 W&S Motorsport
3	R1	(Belgium) Spa	(United Kingdom) McKenzy Cresswell (United Kingdom) Josh Rattican	**(France) Grégory Guilvert** **(France) Paul Petit**	(Germany) Joachim Bölting (Germany) Hendrik Still	(Germany) Daniel Bllickle (Germany) Max Kronberg
3	R2	(Belgium) Spa	(United Kingdom) No. 78 Elite Motorsport With Entire Race Engineering	**(France) No. 8 Team Speedcar**	(Germany) No. 32 W&S Motorsport	(Germany) No. 30 W&S Motorsport
3	R2	(Belgium) Spa	(United Kingdom) McKenzy Cresswell (United Kingdom) Josh Rattican	**(France) Grégory Guilvert** **(France) Paul Petit**	(Germany) Joachim Bölting (Germany) Hendrik Still	(Germany) Daniel Bllickle (Germany) Max Kronberg
4	R1	(Italy) Misano	(United Kingdom) No. 78 Elite Motorsport With Entire Race Engineering	**(France) No. 3 Team Speedcar**	(Spain) No. 7 Mirage Racing	(France) No. 317 Chazel Technologie Course
4	R1	(Italy) Misano	(United Kingdom) McKenzy Cresswell (United Kingdom) Josh Rattican	**(France) Robert Consani** **(France) Benjamin Lariche**	Stanislav Safronov; Aleksandr Vaintrub	(France) Antoni de Barn (France) Jean-Mathieu Leandri
4	R2	(Italy) Misano	**(France)** No. 3 Team Speedcar	**(France) No. 3 Team Speedcar**	(Spain) No. 7 Mirage Racing	(France) No. 317 Chazel Technologie Course
4	R2	(Italy) Misano	(France) Robert Consani (France) Benjamin Lariche	**(France) Robert Consani** **(France) Benjamin Lariche**	Stanislav Safronov; Aleksandr Vaintrub	(France) Antoni de Barn (France) Jean-Mathieu Leandri
5	R1	(Germany) Nürburgring	(Switzerland) No. 39 Racing Spirit of Léman	(United Kingdom) **No. 78 Elite Motorsport With Entire Race Engineering**	(Spain) No. 7 Mirage Racing	(Germany) No. 30 W&S Motorsport
5	R1	(Germany) Nürburgring	(France) Baudouin Detout (Luxembourg) Clément Seyler	(United Kingdom) **McKenzy Cresswell** **(United Kingdom) Josh Rattican**	Stanislav Safronov; Aleksandr Vaintrub	(Germany) Daniel Bllickle (Germany) Max Kronberg
5	R2	(Germany) Nürburgring	(France) No. 87 Matmut Évolution	(France) **No. 87 Matmut Évolution**	(Spain) No. 7 Mirage Racing	(Germany) No. 30 W&S Motorsport
5	R2	(Germany) Nürburgring	(France) Hadrien David (Spain) Jan Duran	(France) **Hadrien David** **(Spain) Jan Duran**	Stanislav Safronov; Aleksandr Vaintrub	(Germany) Daniel Bllickle (Germany) Max Kronberg
6	R1	(Spain) Barcelona	(United Kingdom) No. 78 Elite Motorsport With Entire Race Engineering	(France) **No. 87 Matmut Évolution**	(France) No. 51 CMR	(Germany) No. 30 W&S Motorsport
6	R1	(Spain) Barcelona	(United Kingdom) McKenzy Cresswell (United Kingdom) Josh Rattican	(France) **Hadrien David** **(Spain) Jan Duran**	(France) Hugo Mogica (France) Thibaut Mogica	(Germany) Daniel Bllickle (Germany) Max Kronberg
6	R2	(Spain) Barcelona	(United Kingdom) No. 78 Elite Motorsport With Entire Race Engineering	(France) **No. 87 Matmut Évolution**	(France) No. 51 CMR	(Germany) No. 30 W&S Motorsport
6	R2	(Spain) Barcelona	(United Kingdom) McKenzy Cresswell (United Kingdom) Josh Rattican	(France) **Hadrien David** **(Spain) Jan Duran**	(France) Hugo Mogica (France) Thibaut Mogica	(Germany) Daniel Bllickle (Germany) Max Kronberg

=== Scoring system ===
Championship points are awarded for the first ten positions in each race. Entries are required to complete 75% of the winning car's race distance in order to be classified and earn points.

Position	**1st**	**2nd**	**3rd**	**4th**	**5th**	**6th**	**7th**	**8th**	**9th**	**10th**	**Pole**
Points	25	18	15	12	10	8	6	4	2	1	1

=== Drivers' championships ===
==== Silver drivers' standings ====
Pos.	Driver	Team	LEC (France)		ZAN (Netherlands)		SPA (Belgium)		MIS (Italy)		NÜR (Germany)		BAR (Spain)		Points
1	(France) Robert Consani (France) Benjamin Lariche	(France) Team Speedcar	6	1	2	1^{P}	2	3	1	1^{P}	Ret	8	6	6	181
2	(France) Hadrien David (Spain) Jan Duran	(France) Matmut Évolution	2	2	20	2	Ret	6	9	17	2	1^{P}	1	1	158
3	(Turkey) Berkay Besler (Italy) Gabriele Piana	(Turkey) Borusan Otomotiv Motorsport	9	4	9	4	4	1	3	14	3	2	2	3	146
4	(Spain) Lluc Ibáñez (United States) Alexandre Papadopulos	(Spain) NM Racing Team	5	5	5	3	10	12	2	3	7	4	4	8	113
5	(United Kingdom) McKenzy Cresswell (United Kingdom) Josh Rattican	(United Kingdom) Elite Motorsports with Entire Race Engineering	4	21	6	Ret	8^{P}	2^{P}	5^{P}	7	1	Ret	12^{P}	2^{P}	106
6	(United States) Erik Evans (Canada) Marco Signoretti	(United Kingdom) Academy Motorsport	1	8	1	5	Ret	7	8	6	Ret	3	Ret	11	97
7	(France) Grégory Guilvert (France) Paul Petit	(France) Team Speedcar	Ret^{P}	11^{P}	3^{P}	6	1	Ret	7	4	9	6	10	5	91
8	(Netherlands) Ricardo van der Ende (Belgium) Benjamin Lessennes	(France) L'Espace Bienvenue	3	6	4	17	6	4	4	13	6	7	Ret	9	83
9	(Brazil) Pedro Ebrahim (Turkey) Yagiz Gedik	(Turkey) Borusan Otomotiv Motorsport	12	3	Ret	Ret	9	Ret	6	2	5	9	5	7	71
10	(United Kingdom) Charlie Hart (United Kingdom) Callum Davies	(United States) RAFA Racing by Race Lab	Ret	20	11	9	5	5	14	18	Ret	5	3	Ret	47
11	(France) Baudouin Detout (Luxembourg) Clément Seyler	(Switzerland) Racing Spirit of Léman	8	7	12	8	12	14	Ret	9	4^{P}	12			29
12	(Romania) Sergiu Nicolae (Romania) Tudor Tudurachi	(Romania) Willi Motorsport	17	12	16	12	14	16	15	8	8	11	7	4	26
13	(France) Ethan Gialdini	(France) CMR	10	13	10	15	3	Ret							17
14	(Brazil) Roberto Faria (Netherlands) Ruben del Sarte	(Spain) Mirage Racing	7	10	7	Ret	11	9	10	12	Ret	14	Ret	15	16
15	(Belgium) Michiel Haverans (Belgium) Nathan Vanspringel	(Belgium) TeamFloral	13	14	14	11	7	8	11	15	Ret	10	9	10	16
16	(United Kingdom) Mike Simpson	(France) CMR					3	Ret							15
17	(Slovenia) Mark Kastelic (Finland) Elias Niskanen	(Slovenia) Lema Racing x Mapetrol	20	19	17	16	18	15	12	5	11	Ret	11	13	11
18	(United Kingdom) Aston Millar	(United States) RAFA Racing by Race Lab	15	Ret	13	7	13	10	Ret	11					7
19	(Denmark) Julius Dinesen	(United States) RAFA Racing by Race Lab	15	Ret	13	7			Ret	11					6
20	(Israel) Guy Albag (Israel) Alon Gabbay	(Germany) W&S Motorsport	11	15	8	Ret									4
21	(Switzerland) David Kullman (United Kingdom) Will Orton	(Switzerland) Racing Spirit of Léman	14	9	19	10	15	11	13	10	Ret	DNS	Ret	14	4
22	(France) Nicolas Ciamin	(France) CMR			10	15									1
=	(United Kingdom) Zac Meakin	(United States) RAFA Racing by Race Lab					13	10							1
=	(Netherlands) Jurriaan de Back (Netherlands) Bas Visser	(Netherlands) JW Raceservice	16	18	Ret	14	17	13	16	16	10	13			1
=	(Netherlands) Senna van Walstijn	(France) CMR	10	13											1
Not classified
-	(Spain) Javier Sagrera (United States) Hudson Schwartz	(Portugal) Speedy Motorsport											8	12	0
-	(Belgium) Frédéric Caprasse (France) Mattéo Nomblot	(France) AV Racing	19	16	15	13	16	Ret							0
-	(Austria) Daniel Drexel (Switzerland) Gustavo Xavier	(Austria) Razoon - more than racing	18	17	18	18									0
Pos.	Driver	Team	LEC (France)		ZAN (Netherlands)		SPA (Belgium)		MIS (Italy)		NÜR (Germany)		BAR (Spain)		Points

Key
Colour	Result
Gold	Race winner
Silver	2nd place
Bronze	3rd place
Green	Points finish
Blue	Non-points finish
Blue	Non-classified finish (NC)
Purple	Did not finish (Ret)
Black	Disqualified (DSQ)
Black	Excluded (EX)
White	Did not start (DNS)
White	Race cancelled (C)
White	Withdrew (WD)
Blank	Did not participate

**^{P}** – Pole

==== Pro-Am drivers' standings ====
Pos.	Driver	Team	LEC (France)		ZAN (Netherlands)		SPA (Belgium)		MIS (Italy)		NÜR (Germany)		BAR (Spain)		Points
1	Stanslav Safronov; Aleksandr Vaintrub	(Spain) Mirage Racing	12	5	2	3	5	5	1	1	1^{P}	1	6	3	189
2	(Germany) Joachim Bölting (Germany) Hendrik Still	(Germany) W&S Motorsport	7^{P}	1	1^{P}	1	1^{P}	3	8	4	9	4	12	Ret	157
3	(France) Viny Beltramelli (France) Nicco Ferrarin	(France) JSB Compétition	1	Ret	11	Ret	4	7	5	7	4	3	2	5	114
4	(Sweden) Victor Bouveng (Sweden) Joakim Walde	(Germany) Schubert Motorsport	5	2	7	6	2	8	6	2	2	11	14	Ret	109
5	(France) Cindy Gudet (Czech Republic) Gabriela Jílková	(France) Matmut Évolution	9	3	12	4	6	11	2	Ret	3	2	3	Ret	103
6	(France) Hugo Mogica (France) Thibaut Mogica	(France) CMR	2	9	10	10	Ret	4	9	9^{P}	11	10	1	1^{P}	93
7	(Italy) Stefano d'Aste (Italy) Alberto Naska	(Italy) Lotus PB Racing	6	Ret	4	2^{P}	Ret	1^{P}	Ret	10	10	12^{P}	7	9	81
8	(San Marino) Davide Meloni (San Marino) Paolo Meloni	(San Marino) W&D Racing Team	8	7	8	11	10	Ret	3	6	5	8	8	11	61
9	(Sweden) Edvin Hellsten (Sweden) Daniel Nilsson	(Sweden) Nova Racing			5	7			7	8	8	6	10^{P}	4	57
10	(Belgium) Mathieu Detry (Belgium) Fabian Duffieux	(France) AV Racing	4	Ret	3	5	7	10							44
11	Mikhail Loboda (United Arab Emirates) Vasily Vladykin	(United Arab Emirates) Continental Racing by Simpson Motorsport	Ret	4	DNS	DNS	9	Ret	11	3	7	9	Ret	10	43
12	(Sweden) Hans Holmund (Sweden) Emil Skärås	Toyota Gazoo Racing Sweden					3	2							33
13	(Spain) Marc de Fulgencio (United Kingdom) Branden Oxley	(Spain) NM Racing Team									6	5	5	2	30
14	(France) Olivier Jouffret (France) Eric Tremoulet	(France) Vic'Team	3	6^{P}											24
15	(Belgium) Lucas Cartelle (France) Lucas Sugliano	(France) Chazel Technologie Course	11	8	9	8	12	Ret	4	Ret					22
16	(Switzerland) Gustavo Xavier (Turkey) Önder Erdem	(Austria) Razoon - more than racing					14	WD	Ret^{P}	Ret	12	7	9	6	21
17	(Belgium) Lorenzo Donniacuo (Belgium) Alessandro Tudisca	(France) AV Racing							10	5					11
18	(United States) Andy Cantu (Portugal) Miguel Cristóvão	(Spain) NM Racing Team	10	Ret	6	9									11
19	(United States) Jason Hart (United States) Matt Travis	(United States) Nolasport					11	6							8
20	(Netherlands) Bas Visser	(Netherlands) JW Raceservice											13	8	6
21	(United Kingdom) Matthew Higgins (United Kingdom) Pierre Livingstone	(Spain) NM Racing Team					8	Ret							4
22	(Germany) Danny Berndt (Austria) Richard Wolf	(Austria) Razoon - more than racing					13	9							2
Not classified
-	(Portugal) Tomàs Guedas (Portugal) Jose Carlos Pires	(Portugal) Speedy Motorsport											4	Ret	0
-	(Spain) Maximilien Huber (Belgium) Arthur Rasse	(France) AV Racing											11	7	0
-	(Netherlands) Rutger Brakel	(Netherlands) JW Raceservice											13	8	0
Pos.	Team	Driver	LEC (France)		ZAN (Netherlands)		SPA (Belgium)		MIS (Italy)		NÜR (Germany)		BAR (Spain)		Points

==== Am drivers' standings ====
Pos.	Driver	Team	LEC (France)		ZAN (Netherlands)		SPA (Belgium)		MIS (Italy)		NÜR (Germany)		BAR (Spain)		Points
1	(Germany) Daniel Blickle (Germany) Max Kronberg	(Germany) W&S Motorsport	2	Ret	1^{P}	2	1	1^{P}	4^{P}	2	1^{P}	1^{P}	1	1^{P}	248
2	(France) Antoni de Barn (France) Jean-Mathieu Leandri	(France) Chazel Technologie Course	1^{P}	1^{P}	2	1^{P}	Ret	2	1	1^{P}	8	4	Ret	WD	186
3	(Sweden) Christoffer Brunnhagen (Sweden) Mikael Brunnhagen	Toyota Gazoo Racing Sweden	4	4	8	5	4	3	5	3	5	5	3	4	147
4	(United States) Keith Gatehouse; Igor Sorokin	(Spain) NM Racing Team	5	2	4	3	5	8	7	5	6	6	4	3	138
5	(Sweden) Stedfan Nilsson (Sweden) Mats Olsson	(Germany) Schubert Motorsport	6	3	6	6	3	4	2	Ret	7	8	6	7	116
6	(France) Julien Ripert (France) Philippe Thalamy	(France) Team Speedcar	3	5	5	7	Ret^{P}	5	3	4	4	7	Ret	5	114
7	(India) Ajith Kumar	(France) AV Racing	7	6	7	Ret	6	7	6	Ret	8	9	5	6	72
8	(Sweden) Hans Holmund	Toyota Gazoo Racing Sweden			3	4					2	2			63
9	(Germany) Tobias Erdmann (Germany) Bernd Schaible	(Germany) Seyffarth Motorsport					2	6							26
10	(France) Romain Vozniak	(France) AV Racing									3	3	5	6	12
Not classified
-	(United States) Ismaeel Ellahi (United States) Tim Horrell	(Germany) W&S Motorsport											2	8	0
-	(Saudi Arabia) Ali Juffali (Saudi Arabia) Reema Juffali	(United Kingdom) Elite Motorsports with Entire Race Engineering											Ret^{P}	2	0
-	(Spain) Maximilien Huber	(France) AV Racing									3	3			0
Pos.	Driver	Team	LEC (France)		ZAN (Netherlands)		SPA (Belgium)		MIS (Italy)		NÜR (Germany)		BAR (Spain)		Points

=== Teams' championships ===
==== Silver teams' standings ====
Pos.	Team	LEC (France)		ZAN (Netherlands)		SPA (Belgium)		MIS (Italy)		NÜR (Germany)		BAR (Spain)		Points
1	(France) Team Speedcar	6^{P}	1^{P}	2^{P}	1^{P}	1	3	1	1^{P}	9	6	6	5	203
2	(Turkey) Borusan Otomotiv Motorsport	9	3	9	4	4	1	3	2	3	2	2	3	172
3	(France) Matmut Évolution	2	2	20	2	Ret	6	9	17	2	1^{P}	1	1	162
4	(Spain) NM Racing Team	5	5	5	3	10	12	2	3	7	4	4	8	126
5	(United Kingdom) Elite Motorsports with Entire Race Engineering	4	21	6	Ret	8^{P}	2^{P}	5^{P}	7	1	Ret	12^{P}	2^{P}	114
6	(United Kingdom) Academy Motorsport	1	8	1	5	Ret	7	8	6	Ret	3	Ret	11	107
7	(France) L'Espace Bienvenue	3	6	4	17	6	4	4	13	6	7	Ret	9	96
8	(United States) RAFA Racing by Race Lab	15	20	11	7	5	5	14	11	Ret	5	3	Ret	58
9	(Romania) Willi Motorsport	17	12	16	12	14	16	15	8	8	11	7	4	38
10	(Switzerland) Racing Spirit of Léman	8	7	12	8	12	11	13	9	4^{P}	12	Ret	14	38
11	(Belgium) Team Floral-Vanspringel	13	14	14	11	7	8	11	15	Ret	10	9	10	32
12	(Spain) Mirage Racing	7	10	7	Ret	11	9	10	12	Ret	14	Ret	15	27
13	(France) CMR	10	13	10	15	3	Ret							22
14	(Slovenia) Lema Racing	20	19	17	16	18	15	12	5	11	Ret	11	13	19
15	(Germany) W&S Motorsport	11	15	8	Ret									6
16	(Netherlands) JW Raceservice	16	18	Ret	14	17	13	16	16	10	13			2
17	(France) AV Racing	19	16	15	13	16	Ret							1
Not classified
-	(Portugal) Speedy Motorsport											8	12	0
-	(Austria) Razoon - more than racing	18	17	18	18									0
Pos.	Team	LEC (France)		ZAN (Netherlands)		SPA (Belgium)		MIS (Italy)		NÜR (Germany)		BAR (Spain)		Points

==== Pro-Am teams' standings ====
Pos.	Team	LEC (France)		ZAN (Netherlands)		SPA (Belgium)		MIS (Italy)		NÜR (Germany)		BAR (Spain)		Points
1	(Spain) Mirage Racing	12	5	2	3	5	5	1	1	1^{P}	1	6	3	189
2	(Germany) W&S Motorsport	7^{P}	1	1^{P}	1	1^{P}	3	8	4	9	4	12	Ret	154
3	(France) JSB Compétition	1	Ret	11	Ret	4	7	5	7	4	3	2	5	114
4	(Germany) Schubert Motorsport	5	2	7	6	2	8	6	2	2	11	14	Ret	108
5	(France) Matmut Évolution	9	3	12	4	6	11	2	Ret	3	2	3	Ret	103
6	(France) CMR	2	9	10	10	Ret	4	9	9^{P}	11	10	1	1^{P}	91
7	(Italy) Lotus PB Racing	6	Ret	4	2^{P}	Ret	1^{P}	Ret	10	10	12^{P}	7	9	78
8	(Spain) NM Racing Team	10	Ret	6	9	8	Ret			6	5	5	2	63
9	(France) AV Racing	4	Ret	3	5	7	10	10	5			11	7	62
10	(San Marino) W&D Racing Team	8	7	8	11	10	Ret	3	6	5	8	8	11	58
11	(Sweden) Nova Racing			5	7			7	8	8	6	10^{P}	4	53
12	(United Arab Emirates) Continental Racing by Simpson Motorsport	Ret	4	DNS	DNS	9	Ret	11	3	7	9	Ret	10	37
13	Toyota Gazoo Racing Sweden					3	2							33
14	(France) Vic'Team	3	6^{P}											24
15	(France) Chazel Technologie Course	11	8	9	8	12	Ret	4	Ret					22
16	(Austria) Razoon - more than racing					13	9	Ret^{P}	Ret	12	7	9	6	21
17	(United States) Nolasport					11	6							8
18	(Netherlands) JW Raceservice											13	8	4
Not classified
-	(Portugal) Speedy Motorsport											4	Ret	0
Pos.	Driver	LEC (France)		ZAN (Netherlands)		SPA (Belgium)		MIS (Italy)		NÜR (Germany)		BAR (Spain)		Points

==== Am teams' standings ====
Pos.	Team	LEC (France)		ZAN (Netherlands)		SPA (Belgium)		MIS (Italy)		NÜR (Germany)		BAR (Spain)		Points
1	(Germany) W&S Motorsport	2	Ret	1^{P}	2	1	1^{P}	4^{P}	2	1^{P}	1^{P}	1	1^{P}	248
2	(France) Chazel Technologie Course	1^{P}	1^{P}	2	1^{P}	Ret	2	1	1^{P}	8	4	Ret	DNS	188
3	Toyota Gazoo Racing Sweden	4	4	3	2	4	3	5	3	2	2	3	4	172
4	(Spain) NM Racing Team	5	2	4	3	5	8	7	5	6	6	4	3	142
5	(Germany) Schubert Motorsport	6	3	6	6	3	4	2	Ret	7	8	6	7	122
6	(France) Team Speedcar	3	5	5	7	Ret^{P}	5	3	4	4	7	Ret	5	118
7	(France) AV Racing	7	6	7	Ret	6	7	6	Ret	9	9	5	6	76
8	(Germany) Seyffarth Motorsport					2	6							26
Not classified
-	(United Kingdom) Elite Motorsports with Entire Race Engineering											Ret^{P}	2	0
Pos.	Team	LEC (France)		ZAN (Netherlands)		SPA (Belgium)		MIS (Italy)		NÜR (Germany)		BAR (Spain)		Points

== See also ==
- 2025 British GT Championship
- 2025 French GT4 Cup
- 2025 GT4 America Series
- 2025 GT4 Australia Series
- 2025 SRO GT Cup
- 2025 SRO Japan Cup
