= Benjamin Sylvestersson =

Finnish racing driver (born 2007)

- Sylvestersson in 2026
- Nationality: (Finland) Finnish
- Born: 16 May 2007 (age 19) Parainen, Finland

ADAC GT4 Germany career
- Debut season: 2024
- Current team: FK Performance Motorsport
- Categorisation: FIA Silver
- Car number: 51
- Former teams: Promodrive
- Starts: 26
- Wins: 3
- Podiums: 8
- Poles: 0
- Fastest laps: 1
- Best finish: 2nd in 2026

Previous series
- 2024 2023: XGT4 Italy; Mini Challenge Italy – Academy

Benjamin Sylvestersson (born 16 May 2007) is a Finnish racing driver who last competed in ADAC GT4 Germany for FK Performance Motorsport.

== Career ==
Sylvestersson began karting in 2014, competing until 2021. Primarily racing in Finland, Sylvestersson was runner-up in the 2019 IAME Series Finland's X30 Cadet standings, as well as finishing sixth in the Finnish Championship in OK-J two years later.

In 2022, Sylvestersson made his car racing debut in the V1600 Finnish Championship, a series for production cars, making sporadic appearances across two years. In 2023, Sylvestersson's main campaign was in Mini Challenge Italy, in which he competed from Vallelunga onwards as he was underage for the season opener. He won five times in class and finished on the podium in all 10 races he started to secure runner-up honours in the Academy standings.

Moving up to GT4 competition in 2024, Sylvestersson joined Promodrive to drive a BMW M4 GT4 in XGT4 Italy. After taking his first win of the season at Imola, Sylvestersson swept Mugello and finished third in both races of the Misano finale to clinch runner-up honours overall. Sylvestersson also made one-off cameos for the team in the GT4 European Series and ADAC GT4 Germany, where he graduated to for 2025. Partnering Joseph Ellerine at FK Performance Motorsport, Sylvestersson began the year with two podiums from select outings in the GT4 Winter Series. In his debut season in ADAC GT4 Germany, Sylvestersson took a best result of eighth at the Nürburgring to end the year 14th overall.

In 2026, Sylvestersson joined former champion Gabriele Piana in FK Performance's #51 BMW. He began the season with a win at the Red Bull Ring, becoming the first Finnish driver in series history to take an overall win, and followed that up with three podiums between the Oschersleben and Nürburgring rounds. Sylvestersson then won the only race at Sachsenring and race one at the Hockenheimring to clinch runner-up honours overall.

== Karting record ==
=== Karting career summary ===
Season	Series	Team	Position
2017	RMC Finland — Micro Max		6th
2018	RMC Finland — Mini Max		5th
2019	IAME Series Finland — X30 Cadet		2nd
2020	Finnish Championship — OK-J		12th
2020	Karting European Championship — OK-J	Koski Motorsport	91st
2021	WSK Super Master Series — OK-J	Exprit Racing Team	107th
2021	Champions of the Future — OK-J	Exprit Racing Team	81st
2021	Karting European Championship — OK-J	Exprit Racing Team	72nd
2021	Finnish Championship — OK-J		6th

== Racing record ==
=== Racing career summary ===
Season	Series	Team	Races	Wins	Poles	F/Laps	Podiums	Points	Position
2022	V1600 Finnish Championship		5	0	0	0	0	48	11th
2023	Mini Challenge Italy – Academy		10	5	0	3	10	91	**2nd**
2023	V1600 Finnish Championship								
2024	XGT4 Italy	Promodrive		3					**2nd**
2024	GT4 European Series – Silver	Promodrive	2	0	0	0	0	0	NC
2024	ADAC GT4 Germany	Promodrive	2	0	0	0	0	0	NC†
2025	GT4 Winter Series	FK Performance Motorsport	6	0	0	0	2	46	14th
2025	ADAC GT4 Germany	FK Performance Motorsport	12	0	0	0	0	48	14th
2026	ADAC GT4 Germany	FK Performance Motorsport	12	3	0	1	8	200	**2nd**
2026	Nürburgring Langstrecken-Serie – BMW M2 Racing	FK Performance Motorsport	1	0	0	0	0	8*	NC*

^{†} As Sylvestersson was a guest driver, he was ineligible to score points.

=== Complete GT4 European Series results ===
(key) (Races in bold indicate pole position) (Races in italics indicate fastest lap)

Year	Team	Car	Class	1	2	3	4	5	6	7	8	9	10	11	12	Pos	Points
2024	Promodrive	BMW M4 GT4 Gen II	Silver	LEC; 1	LEC; 2	MIS; 1; 20	MIS; 2; 26	SPA; 1	SPA; 2	HOC; 1	HOC; 2	MNZ; 1	MNZ; 2	JED; 1	JED; 2	NC	0

=== Complete ADAC GT4 Germany results ===
(key) (Races in bold indicate pole position) (Races in italics indicate fastest lap)

Year	Team	Car	1	2	3	4	5	6	7	8	9	10	11	12	13	DC	Points
2024	Promodrive	BMW M4 GT4	OSC; 1	OSC; 2	LAU; 1	LAU; 2	NOR; 1	NOR; 2	NÜR; 1	NÜR; 2	RBR; 1; 17	RBR; 2; 13	HOC; 1	HOC; 2		NC†	0†
2025	FK Performance Motorsport	BMW M4 GT4 Evo (G82)	OSC; 1; 14	OSC; 2; 12	NOR; 1; 12	NOR; 2; 12	NÜR; 1; 10	NÜR; 2; 8	SAC; 1; 14	SAC; 2; 14	RBR; 1; 13	RBR; 2; 15	HOC; 1; 15	HOC; 2; 10		14th	48
2026	FK Performance Motorsport	BMW M4 GT4 Evo (G82)	RBR; 1; 1	RBR; 2; 2	NOR; 1; 9	NOR; 2; 4	OSC; 1; 3	OSC; 2; 2	NÜR; 1 Ret	NÜR; 2; 2	**SAC**; **1**; 1	SAC; 2 C	HOC; 1; 1	HOC; 2; 3	**HOC**; **3**; 4	2nd	200
