= Hendrik Still =

German racing driver (born 1987)

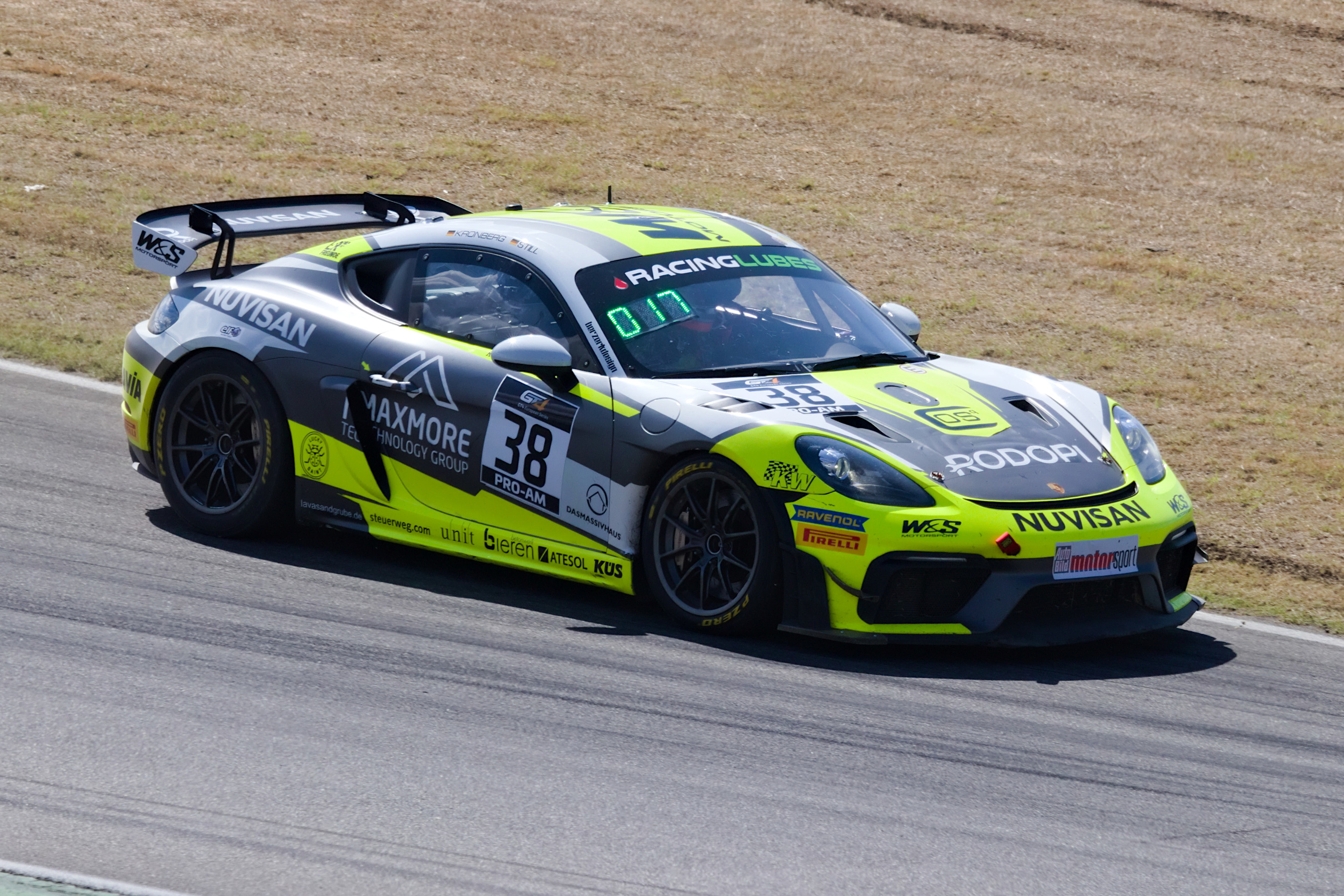
- Still in 2022
- Nationality: (Germany) German
- Born: 31 July 1987 (age 39) Bad Neuenahr, Germany
- Categorisation: FIA Silver

Championship titles
- 2026 2019 2017 2017 2015: ADAC GT4 Germany – Pro-Am; Porsche Super Sports Cup Germany – 5F; V de V Endurance Series – LMP3; Lamborghini Super Trofeo Middle East – Pro-Am; VLN Series – SP10 GT4

Hendrik Still (born 31 July 1987) is a German racing driver who last competed in the GT4 European Series and ADAC GT4 Germany for W&S Motorsport.

A Porsche specialist in GT4, Still is a VLN Series champion, Nürburgring 24 Hours class winner, and GT4 European Series and ADAC GT4 Germany runner-up. Additionally, he has won the V de V Endurance Series in LMP3, and the 24 Hours of Spa in class in GT3.

== Career ==
Still began his racing career in 2004, competing in the SEAT Ibiza Cup. Having competed in entry-level one-make series until 2006, Still made his VLN debut in 2008 and primarily raced there until 2015. During that time frame, Still most notably won the SP10 title in VLN and the 24 Hours of Nürburgring in 2015. That year, Still also joined Sofia Car Motorsport in the GT4 European Series, in which he gave the Bulgarian-built SIN R1 GT4 pole positions at Nogaro and Spielberg, and its maiden Pro class podium at Misano (with Andreas Gülden) to take eighth in points.

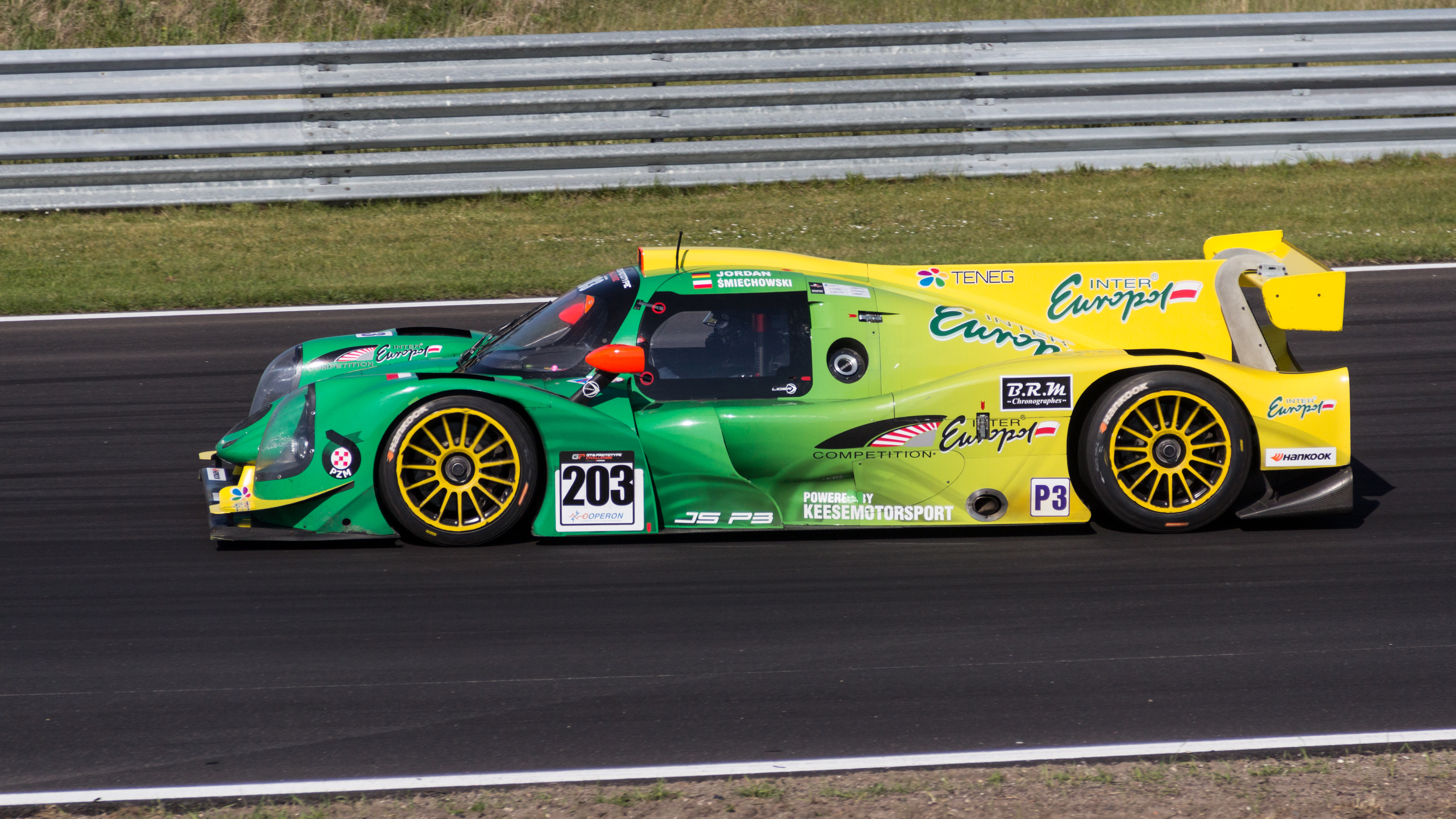
An Inter Europol Ligier JS P3, identical to the one Still drove to the V de V title in 2017.

In 2016, Still stayed with Sofia Car for much of the GT4 European Series, and later made his Blancpain GT Series Endurance Cup debut for Konrad Motorsport at the Nürburgring. That year, Still also won the 12 Hours of Brno in the 991 class for MSG Motorsport. In 2017, Still continued with Konrad to mainly compete in Lamborghini Super Trofeo, winning the Pro-Am title in the Middle East, and taking a lone win in Europe en route to a fifth-place points finish. Still also drove for Konrad at the 24 Hours of Nürburgring, sharing a Lamborghini Huracán GT3 with factory drivers in the premier SP9 class. In parallel, Still raced for Inter Europol Competition in the LMP3 class of the V de V Endurance Series, winning at Algarve and Jarama to clinch the title together with Jakub Śmiechowski.

Returning to GT4 competition for 2018, Still competed for Porsche-fielding Allied Racing in the Pro-Am class of the GT4 European Series, as well as winning the 12 Hours of Imola in class. He also raced for Inter Europol Competition in the LMP3 class of the V de V Endurance Series and European Le Mans Series, winning once in the former at Navarra. Moving to the newly-created ADAC GT4 Germany for 2019 with Porsche legend Timo Bernhard's KÜS Team75 Bernhard team, Still scored a lone podium at Sachsenring to end the season 17th in points. That year, Still also won the Porsche Super Sports Cup Germany title in the 5F class, and took Am victory at the 24 Hours of Spa for Rinaldi Racing in a Ferrari 488 GT3.

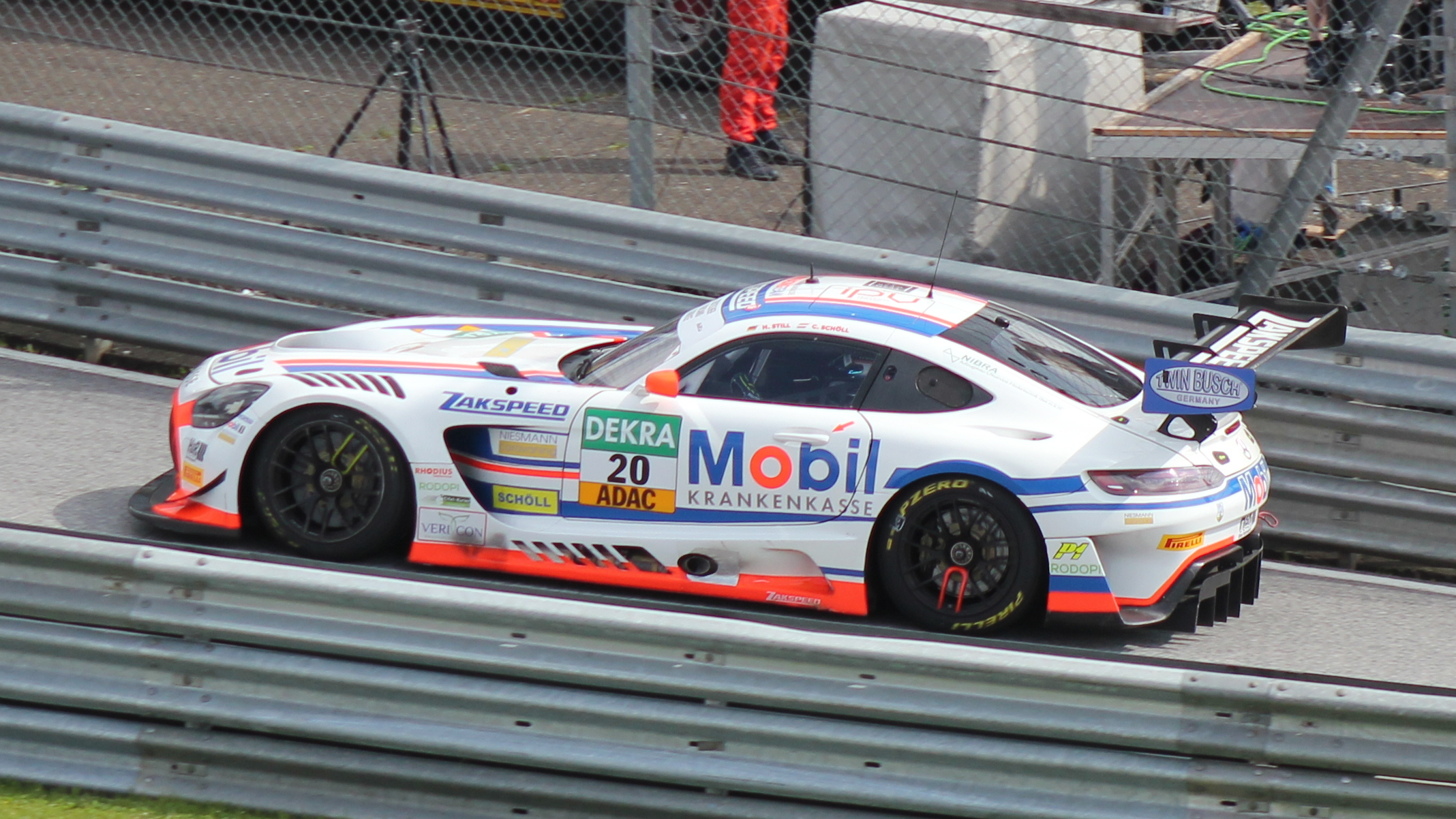
Still's Zakspeed Mercedes at the Red Bull Ring in 2021, his only full season in the ADAC GT Masters.

Continuing in ADAC GT4 Germany for 2020, Still switched to Team AVIA Sorg Rennsport, sharing a BMW M4 GT4 with Jan Marschalkowski. After two rounds, the pair moved to Mercedes-fielding Team Zakspeed, winning on debut at the Sachsenring and taking two other podiums to end the year fifth overall. Remaining with Zakspeed for 2021, Still graduated full-time to the ADAC GT Masters, finishing 41st in a Mercedes-AMG GT3 Evo with Constantin Schöll, in a year in which he also finished second in the TCR class of the 24 Hours of Nürburgring for Hyundai Motorsport N.

In early 2022, Still returned to Rinaldi Racing to compete in the LMP3 class of the Asian Le Mans Series, taking a lone podium at Abu Dhabi to end the winter third in points with Torsten Kratz and Leonard Weiss. Returning to GT4 competition for the rest of the year, Still joined W&S Motorsport for a dual campaign in ADAC GT4 Germany and the Pro-Am class of the GT4 European Series, sharing a Porsche Cayman GT4 Clubsport MR with Max Kronberg in both. In the former, Still took a best result of fourth twice to end the year 10th in points, whereas in Europe he scored a pair of class podiums at the Hockenheimring en route to an eighth-place points finish.

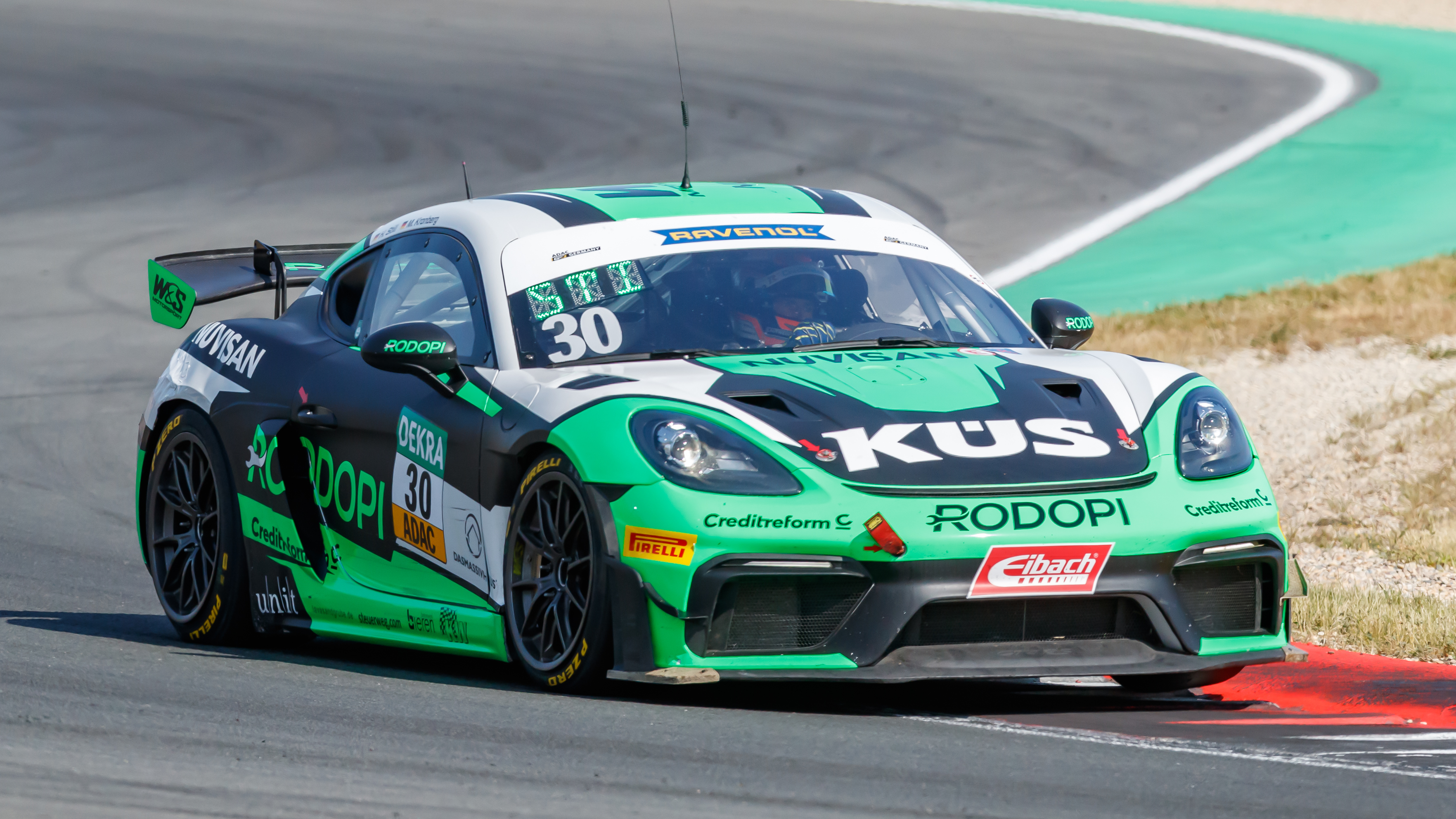
Still's green W&S Motorsport Porsche at Oschersleben in ADAC GT4 Germany in 2023.

In 2023, Still and Kronberg remained with W&S Motorsport for another dual campaign in ADAC GT4 Germany and the Pro-Am class of the GT4 European Series. In Germany, Still took a lone win at the Hockenheimring to end the season eighth overall, while in Europe he took his maiden overall win at the same venue to secure third in Pro-Am points. Continuing with Kronberg and W&S for another ADAC GT4 Germany season in 2024, Still took four podiums and a pole position in the six-round season to move to sixth in the overall standings. In the GT4 European Series, Still switched to the Silver Cup to partner Fabio Rauer in a PROsport Racing Aston Martin, most notably qualifying on pole at the season opener at Le Castellet. However, the campaign was cut short when the team left the series with two rounds to go over balance of performance complaints.

For 2025, Still returned to W&S Motorsport to compete in ADAC GT4 Germany and the Pro-Am class of the GT4 European Series, sharing a Porsche 718 Cayman GT4 Clubsport with Philipp Gogollok in the former and Joachim Bölting in the latter. In ADAC, Still took three wins between the Nürburgring, Red Bull Ring and Hockenheimring to secure runner-up spot. In the SRO series, Still took four consecutive Pro-Am class wins across the Le Castellet, Zandvoort and Spa rounds to also clinch runner-up honours. In 2026, Still continued with W&S Motorsport for another dual campaign, alongside Tim Horrell in ADAC GT4 and Bölting in GT4 Europe. During 2026, Still also won on a one-off appearance in the Supercars Endurance Series at Vila Real. In the former, Still took a best result of sixth at the Hockenheimring finale to end the season 11th overall and secure the Pro-Am title, whereas in the latter he scored a lone Pro-Am podium at Le Castellet to end the year eighth in points.

== Racing record ==
=== Racing career summary ===
Season	Series	Team	Races	Wins	Poles	F/Laps	Podiums	Points	Position
2004	SEAT Ibiza Cup								
2005	Toyota Yaris Cup		12					57.5	19th
2006	Toyota Yaris Cup		13					57	13th
2008	VLN Series								
2010	VLN Series	Boes Motorsport							
2010	24 Hours of Nürburgring – SP10 GT4	Boes Motorsport	1	0	0	0	0	—N/a	6th
2011	VLN Series	GreenMamba Racing							
2011	24 Hours of Nürburgring – SP10 GT4		1	0	0	0	1	—N/a	**2nd**
2012	VLN Series								
2012	24 Hours of Nürburgring – SP10 GT4		1	0	0	0	0	—N/a	9th
2013	VLN Series								
2013	24 Hours of Nürburgring – Cup 1	Raceunion Teichmann Racing	1	0	0	0	0	—N/a	DNF
2014	VLN Series								
2014	24 Hours of Nürburgring – SP10 GT4	STADAvita Racing Team	1	0	0	0	0	—N/a	DNF
2014	GT4 European Series – Invitation	Mathol Racing	2	1	1	2	1	0	NC†
2015	VLN Series – SP10 GT4		8	6	0	5	6		**1st**
2015	GT4 European Series – Pro	Sofia Car Motorsport	8	0	2	0	1	59	8th
2015	24 Hours of Nürburgring – SP10 GT4	Team Mathol Racing e.V.	1	1	0	0	1	—N/a	**1st**
2016	GT4 European Series – Pro	Sofia Car Motorsport	5	0	1	0	0	28	14th
2016	GT4 European Series – Pro	PROsport Performance	1	0	0	0	0	28	14th
2016	Blancpain GT Series Endurance Cup	Konrad Motorsport	1	0	0	0	0	0	NC
2016	Blancpain GT Series Endurance Cup – Pro-Am	Konrad Motorsport	1	0	0	0	0	2	47th
2016	24H Series – 991	MSG Motorsport	2	1	0	0	1	18	11th
2017	Lamborghini Super Trofeo Middle East – Pro-Am	Konrad Motorsport	6	3	2	5	6	83	**1st**
2017	Lamborghini Super Trofeo Europe – Pro-Am	Konrad Motorsport	11	1	2	1	5	94	5th
2017	International GT Open – Pro-Am	Konrad Motorsport	8	0	0	0	0	2	26th
2017	Lamborghini Super Trofeo World Finals – Pro-Am	Konrad Motorsport	2	0	0	2	0		
2017	V de V Endurance Series – LMP3	Inter Europol Competition	6	2			4	218.5	**1st**
2017	GT4 European Series Northern Cup – Silver	RN Vision STS	2	0	0	0	0	8	32nd
2017	GT4 European Series Northern Cup – Pro-Am	RN Vision STS	2	0	0	0	0	12	19th
2017	24 Hours of Nürburgring – SP9	Konrad Motorsport	1	0	0	0	0	—N/a	DNF
2017	24H Series – A6-Pro	Konrad Motorsport	1	0	0	0	0	0	NC
2018	GT4 European Series – Pro-Am	Allied Racing	8	0	0	0	0	23	21st
2018	24H GT Series Europe – 991	Allied Racing	1	0	0	0	0	4	NC
2018	24H GT Series Europe – GT4	Allied Racing	1	1	0	0	1	0	NC
2018	V de V Endurance Series – LMP3	Inter Europol Competition	2	1	0	0	1	79	18th
2018	European Le Mans Series – LMP3	Inter Europol Competition	2	0	0	0	0	1	35th
2019	24H GT Series Continents – A6	Wochenspiegel Team Monschau	3	0	0	0	0	37	NC
2019	24H GT Series Continents – A6	Toksport WRT	3	0	0	0	0	37	NC
2019	ADAC GT4 Germany	KÜS Team75 Bernhard	12	0	0	1	1	11	17th
2019	Porsche Super Sports Cup Germany – 5F		8	6	4	8	7	206.4	**1st**
2019	24 Hours of Nürburgring – SP9	Wochenspiegel Team Monschau	1	0	0	0	0	—N/a	11th
2019	VLN Series – SP8	WS Racing	1	0	0	0	1		19th
2019	VLN Series – V6	Team Mathol Racing e.V.	1	1	0	0	1		17th
2019	VLN Series – Cup 3	Team Mathol Racing e.V.	1	0	0	0	1		32nd
2019	Blancpain GT Series Endurance Cup	Rinaldi Racing	1	0	0	0	0	0	NC
2019	Blancpain GT Series Endurance Cup – Am	Rinaldi Racing	1	1	0	0	1	38	13th
2019	VLN Series – SP9	Team Zakspeed	1	0	0	0	0	0	NC
2020	24H GT Series Continents – GT3-Am	Wochenspiegel Team Monschau	1	0	0	0	0	15	7th
2020	24H GT Series Continents – GT3-Am	Car Collection Motorsport	1	0	0	0	1	15	7th
2020	ADAC GT4 Germany	Team AVIA Sorg Rennsport	4	0	0	0	0	132	5th
2020	ADAC GT4 Germany	Team Zakspeed	8	1	1	0	3	132	5th
2020	Nürburgring Langstrecken-Serie – Cup X	Teichmann Racing	2	1	0	0	2	13.33	7th
2020	24 Hours of Nürburgring – SP7	rent2Drive-Familia racing	1	0	0	0	0	—N/a	DNF
2020	ADAC GT Masters	Team Zakspeed BKK Mobil Oil Racing	4	0	0	0	0	6	40th
2021	24H GT Series – GT3-Am	Team Zakspeed	1	0	0	0	0	0	NC
2021	24H GT Series – GT3-Am	WTM Powered by Phoenix	1	0	0	0	0	0	NC
2021	Nürburgring Langstrecken-Serie – Cup X	Teichmann Racing GTX	4	2	2	0	2		
2021	ADAC GT Masters	Team Zakspeed Mobil Krankenkasse Racing	14	0	0	0	0	3	41st
2021	24 Hours of Nürburgring – TCR	Hyundai Motorsport N	1	0	0	0	1	—N/a	**2nd**
2021	GT2 European Series – Pro-Am	Teichmann Racing	0	0	0	0	0	0	NC
2022	24H GT Series Continents – GT3 Am	Huber Racing	1	0	0	0	0	8	NC
2022	Asian Le Mans Series – LMP3	Rinaldi Racing	4	0	0	0	1	54	**3rd**
2022	Nürburgring Langstrecken-Serie – Cup X	Teichmann Racing	3	1	0	0	1		
2022	GT4 European Series – Pro-Am	W&S Motorsport	12	0	0	0	2	78	8th
2022	ADAC GT4 Germany	W&S Motorsport	12	0	0	1	0	81	10th
2022	Porsche Endurance Trophy Nürburgring Cup – CUP2	Team Mathol Racing	3	0	0	0	0	0	NC
2023	Nürburgring Langstrecken-Serie – SP10	Teichmann Racing	4	0	0	0	0	0	NC
2023	Porsche Endurance Trophy Nürburgring Cup – CUP2	Team Mathol Racing	5	1	0	0	3	85.5	11th
2023	GT4 European Series – Pro-Am	W&S Motorsport	10	2	1	0	6	124	**3rd**
2023	ADAC GT4 Germany	W&S Motorsport	12	1	1	0	2	86	8th
2023	24 Hours of Nürburgring – SP10	Teichmann Racing	1	0	0	0	0	—N/a	8th
2024	GT4 European Series – Silver	PROsport Racing	9	0	1	0	0	21	16th
2024	ADAC GT4 Germany	AVIA W&S Motorsport	12	0	1	1	4	111	6th
2024	Nürburgring Langstrecken-Serie – SP10	AVIA W&S Motorsport	4	0	0	0	0	0	NC
2024	24 Hours of Nürburgring – SP10	AVIA W&S Motorsport	1	0	0	0	0	—N/a	11th
2024	Porsche Endurance Trophy Nürburgring Cup – CUP2	KKrämer Racing	1	0	0	0	0	13.5	26th
2024	ADAC GT Masters	PROsport Racing	2	0	0	0	0	0	NC†
2025	Nürburgring Langstrecken-Serie – SP10	W&S Motorsport	4	0	0	0	1	12	NC
2025	GT4 European Series – Pro-Am	W&S Motorsport	12	4	3	0	5	157	**2nd**
2025	ADAC GT4 Germany	W&S Motorsport	12	3	0	1	5	168	**2nd**
2025	24 Hours of Nürburgring – SP10	W&S Motorsport	1	0	0	0	1	—N/a	**3rd**
2025	Supercars Endurance Series – GT4 Pro	Veloso Motorsport	2	1	0	0	1	38	NC
2026	GT4 Winter Series – Pro-Am	W&S Motorsport	3	1	0	0	3	40	8th
2026	Nürburgring Langstrecken-Serie – SP10 Am	W&S Motorsport	3	0	0	0	0	7	NC
2026	GT4 European Series – Pro-Am	W&S Motorsport	10	0	0	0	1	73	8th
2026	ADAC GT4 Germany	W&S Motorsport	12	0	0	0	0	59	11th
2026	24 Hours of Nürburgring – SP10	W&S Motorsport	1	0	0	0	0	—N/a	6th
2026	Nürburgring Langstrecken-Serie – SP7	W&S Motorsport	1	1	0	0	1	8	NC

* Season still in progress.

^{†} As Still was a guest driver, he was ineligible for points.

=== Complete 24 Hours of Nürburgring results ===
Year	Team	Co-Drivers	Car	Class	Laps	Pos.	Class Pos.
2010	(Germany) Boes Motorsport	(Germany) Torsten Kornmeyer (Germany) Dirk Kornmeyer	Ginetta G50 GT4	SP10	112	99th	6th
2011		(Germany) Torsten Kornmeyer (Germany) Dirk Kornmeyer	Ginetta G50 GT4	SP10	134	35th	**2nd**
2012		(Germany) Torsten Kornmeyer (Germany) Dirk Kornmeyer	Ginetta G50 GT4	SP10	105	97th	7th
2013	(Germany) Raceunion Teichmann Racing	(Germany) Michael Funke (Germany) Niki Schelle (Germany) Jannik Olivo	Opel Astra J OPC	Cup 1	18	DNF	DNF
2014	(Australia) STADAvita Racing Team	(Germany) Scott Preacher (Germany) Oliver Louisoder (Germany) Markus Lungstrass	Aston Martin Vantage V8-GT4	SP10	96	NC	NC
2015	(Germany) Team Mathol Racing e.V.	(Germany) Wolfgang Weber (Germany) Norbert Bermes (United Kingdom) Scott Preacher	Aston Martin Vantage V8-GT4	SP10	130	41st	**1st**
2017	(Austria) Konrad Motorsport	(Italy) Marco Mapelli (Germany) Christian Engelhart (Germany) Dominik Farnbacher	Lamborghini Huracan GT3	SP9	14	DNF	DNF
2019	(Germany) Wochenspiegel Team Monschau	(Netherlands) Indy Dontje (Germany) Georg Weiss (Germany) Leonard Weiss	Ferrari 488 GT3	SP9	152	12th	11th
2020	(Germany) rent2Drive-Familia racing	(Germany) "Der Bommel" (Germany) Bernd Kleeschulte (Germany) Phil Hill	Porsche 991 GT3 Cup	SP7	30	DNF	DNF
2021	(South Korea) Hyundai Motorsport N	(Germany) Luca Engstler (France) Jean-Karl Vernay	Hyundai i30 N TCR	TCR	54	33rd	**2nd**
2023	(Germany) Teichmann Racing	(Germany) Stephan Brodmerkel (Germany) Phil Hill (Austria) Constantin Schöll	Toyota GR Supra GT4 Evo	SP10	143	38th	8th
2024	(Germany) W&S Motorsport	(Germany) Stephan Brodmerkel (Germany) Jürgen Vöhringer (Germany) Finn Zulauf	Porsche 718 Cayman GT4 RS Clubsport	SP10	38	88th	11th
2025	(Germany) W&S Motorsport	(Germany) Stephan Brodmerkel (Germany) Jürgen Vöhringer (Germany) Niclas Wiedmann	Porsche 718 Cayman GT4 RS Clubsport	SP10	83	83rd	**3rd**
2026	(Germany) W&S Motorsport	(Germany) Stephan Brodmerkel (Austria) Constantin Schöll (Germany) Jürgen Vöhringer	Porsche 718 Cayman GT4 RS Clubsport	SP10	133	42nd	6th

=== Complete GT4 European Series results ===
(key) (Races in bold indicate pole position) (Races in italics indicate fastest lap)

Year	Team	Car	Class	1	2	3	4	5	6	7	8	9	10	11	12	Pos	Points
2014	Mathol Racing	Aston Martin Vantage GT4	Invitation	MIS; 1	MIS; 2	ZAN; 1	ZAN; 2	SPA; 1	SPA; 2	LEC; 1	LEC; 2	**NÜR**; **1** Ret	NÜR; 2; 9	MNZ; 1	MNZ; 2	NC†	0†
2015	Sofia Car Motorsport	SIN R1 GT4	Pro	**NOG**; **1**; 6	NOG; 2 Ret	ZAN; 1; 17	ZAN; 2; 14	RBR; 1; 10	**RBR**; **2**; 5	SPA; 1	SPA; 2	NÜR; 1 WD	NÜR; 2 WD	MIS; 1 Ret	MIS; 2; 3	8th	59
2016	Sofia Car Motorsport	SIN R1 GT4	Pro	MNZ; 1; 8	**MNZ**; **2** Ret	PAU; 1; 14	PAU; 2; 7	SIL; Ret								14th	28
2016	PROsport Performance	Porsche Cayman GT4 Clubsport	Pro						SPA; 7	HUN; 1	HUN; 2	ZAN; 1	ZAN; 2			14th	28
2017	RN Vision STS	Porsche Cayman GT4 Clubsport MR	Silver	MIS; 1	MIS; 2	BRH; 1; 11	BRH; 2; 12	RBR; 1	RBR; 2	SVK; 1	SVK; 2	ZAN; 1	ZAN; 2			32nd	8
2017	RN Vision STS	Porsche Cayman GT4 Clubsport MR	Pro-Am											NÜR; 1; 10	NÜR; 2 Ret	19th	12
2018	Allied-Racing	Porsche Cayman GT4 Clubsport MR	Pro-Am	ZOL; 1; 36	ZOL; 2 Ret	BRH; 1; 22	BRH; 2; 30	MIS; 1 Ret	MIS; 2; 14	SPA; 1; 30	SPA; 2; 28	HUN; 1	HUN; 2	NÜR; 1	NÜR; 2	21st	23
2022	W&S Motorsport	Porsche 718 Cayman GT4 Clubsport MR	Pro-Am	IMO; 1; 7	IMO; 2; 8											8th	78
2022	W&S Motorsport	Porsche 718 Cayman GT4 Clubsport	Pro-Am			LEC; 1; 24	LEC; 2; 17	MIS; 1; 23	MIS; 2; 34	SPA; 1 Ret	SPA; 2 Ret	HOC; 1; 6	HOC; 2; 6	CAT; 1 Ret	CAT; 2; 7	8th	78
2023	W&S Motorsport	Porsche 718 Cayman GT4 RS Clubsport	Pro-Am	MNZ; 1	MNZ; 2	LEC; 1; 15	LEC; 2; 17	SPA; 1; 8	SPA; 2; 14	MIS; 1; 22	MIS; 2; 35	**HOC**; **1**; 1	HOC; 2; 3	CAT; 1 Ret	CAT; 2 Ret	3rd	124
2024	PROsport Racing	Aston Martin Vantage AMR GT4	Silver	LEC; 1; 8	**LEC**; **2**; 4	MIS; 1; 9	MIS; 2; 11	SPA; 1 DNS	SPA; 2; 21	HOC; 1 Ret	HOC; 2; 42†	MNZ; 1	MNZ; 2	JED; 1	JED; 2	16th	21
2025	W&S Motorsport	Porsche 718 Cayman GT4 RS Clubsport	Pro-Am	**LEC**; **1**; 24	LEC; 2; 13	**ZAN**; **1**; 13	ZAN; 2; 9	**SPA**; **1**; 10	SPA; 2; 11	MIS; 1; 22	MIS; 2; 16	NÜR; 1; 24	NÜR; 2; 15	CAT; 1; 24	CAT; 2 Ret	2nd	157
2026	W&S Motorsport	Porsche 718 Cayman GT4 RS Clubsport	Pro-Am	LEC; 1; 12	LEC; 2; 20	MNZ; 1; 33	MNZ; 2 Ret	SPA; 1; 18	SPA; 2; 24	MIS; 1; 21	MIS; 2; 20	ZAN; 1; 20	ZAN; 2; 23	ALG; 1	ALG; 2	8th	73

=== Complete GT World Challenge Europe results ===
==== GT World Challenge Europe Endurance Cup ====
Year	Team	Car	Class	1	2	3	4	5	6	7	Pos.	Points
2016	Konrad Motorsport	Lamborghini Huracán GT3	Pro-Am	MNZ	SIL	LEC	SPA; 6H	SPA; 12H	SPA; 24H	NÜR; 27	47th	2
2019	Rinaldi Racing	Ferrari 488 GT3	Am	MNZ	SIL	LEC	SPA; 6H; 50	SPA; 12H; 35	SPA; 24H; 28	CAT	13th	38

=== Complete International GT Open results ===
Year	Team	Car	Class	1	2	3	4	5	6	7	8	9	10	11	12	13	14	Pos.	Points
2017	Konrad Motorsport	Lamborghini Huracán GT3	Pro-Am	EST; 1	EST; 2	SPA; 1	SPA; 2	LEC; 1; 9	LEC; 2; 9	HUN; 1; 9	HUN; 2; 8	SIL; 1	SIL; 2	MNZ; 1; 10	MNZ; 2; 10	CAT; 1; 10	CAT; 2; 8	26th	2

=== Complete European Le Mans Series results ===
(key) (Races in bold indicate pole position; results in italics indicate fastest lap)

Year	Entrant	Class	Chassis	Engine	1	2	3	4	5	6	Rank	Points
2018	Inter Europol Competition	LMP3	Ligier JS P3	Nissan VK50VE 5.0 L V8	LEC	MNZ; 15	RBR	SIL; 13	SPA	ALG	35th	1

=== Complete ADAC GT4 Germany results ===
(key) (Races in bold indicate pole position) (Races in italics indicate fastest lap)

Year	Team	Car	1	2	3	4	5	6	7	8	9	10	11	12	13	DC	Points
2019	KÜS Team75 Bernhard	Porsche 718 Cayman GT4 Clubsport	OSC; 1; 7	OSC; 2; 16	RBR; 1; 12	RBR; 2; 16	ZAN; 1; 21	ZAN; 2; 16	NÜR; 1; 16	NÜR; 2; 20	HOC; 1; 15	HOC; 2 Ret	SAC; 1; 3	SAC; 2; 11		17th	41
2020	Team AVIA Sorg Rennsport	BMW M4 GT4	NÜR; 1; 16	NÜR; 2; 7	HOC; 1; 4	HOC; 2; 10										5th	132
2020	Team Zakspeed	Mercedes-AMG GT4					SAC; 1; 1	SAC; 2; 7	RBR; 1; 2	RBR; 2; 7	LAU; 1; 2	LAU; 2 Ret	OSC; 1; 4	OSC; 2; 10		5th	132
2022	W&S Motorsport	Porsche 718 Cayman GT4 Clubsport	OSC; 1; 10	OSC; 2; 6	RBR; 1; 12	RBR; 2; 19	ZAN; 1; 4	ZAN; 2; 11	NÜR; 1; 12	NÜR; 2; 27	SAC; 1; 10	SAC; 2; 7	HOC; 1; 4	HOC; 2; 5		10th	81
2023	AVIA W&S Motorsport	Porsche 718 Cayman GT4 Clubsport	OSC; 1; 14	OSC; 2; 12	ZAN; 1; 20	ZAN; 2; 11	NÜR; 1 Ret	NÜR; 2; 6	LAU; 1; 20	LAU; 2; 10	SAC; 1; 7	SAC; 2; 7	HOC; 1; 3	**HOC**; **2**; 1		8th	86
2024	AVIA W&S Motorsport	Porsche 718 Cayman GT4 Clubsport	OSC; 1; 12	OSC; 2; 3	LAU; 1; 9	LAU; 2; 3	NOR; 1; 4	NOR; 2; 3	NÜR; 1; 11	**NÜR**; **2**; 16	RBR; 1; 3	RBR; 2 Ret	HOC; 1; 5	HOC; 2; 13		6th	111
2025	AVIA W&S Motorsport	Porsche 718 Cayman GT4 Clubsport	OSC; 1; 5	OSC; 2; 5	NOR; 1; 5	NOR; 2; 14	NÜR; 1; 1	NÜR; 2 Ret	SAC; 1; 2	SAC; 2; 5	RBR; 1; 1	RBR; 2; 5	HOC; 1; 3	**HOC**; **2**; 1		2nd	168
2026	AVIA W&S Motorsport	Porsche 718 Cayman GT4 Clubsport	RBR; 1; 8	RBR; 2; 10	NOR; 1 Ret	NOR; 2; 8	OSC; 1; 16	OSC; 2; 9	NÜR; 1; 13	NÜR; 2; 17	SAC; 1; 12	SAC; 2 C	HOC; 1; 11	HOC; 2; 8	HOC; 3; 6	11th	59

=== Complete ADAC GT Masters results ===
(key) (Races in bold indicate pole position) (Races in italics indicate fastest lap)

Year	Team	Car	1	2	3	4	5	6	7	8	9	10	11	12	13	14	DC	Points
2020	Team Zakspeed BKK Mobil Oil Racing	Mercedes-AMG GT3 Evo	LAU1; 1	LAU1; 2	NÜR; 1	NÜR; 2	HOC; 1	HOC; 2	SAC; 1	SAC; 2	RBR; 1	RBR; 2	LAU2; 1; 16	LAU2; 2; 13	OSC; 1; 20	OSC; 2; 13	40th	6
2021	Team Zakspeed Mobil Krankenkasse Racing	Mercedes-AMG GT3 Evo	OSC; 1; 23	OSC; 2; 20	RBR; 1 Ret	RBR; 2 Ret	ZAN; 1; 20	ZAN; 2; 15	LAU; 1; 15	LAU; 2; 20	SAC; 1; 16	SAC; 2 Ret	HOC; 1 Ret	HOC; 2; 17	NÜR; 1; 15	NÜR; 2; 18	41st	3
2024	PROsport Racing	Aston Martin Vantage AMR GT3	OSC; 1	OSC; 2	ZAN; 1	ZAN; 2	NÜR; 1	NÜR; 2	SPA; 1; 13	SPA; 2; 11	RBR; 1	RBR; 2	HOC; 1	HOC; 2			NC†	0†

=== Complete Asian Le Mans Series results ===
(key) (Races in bold indicate pole position) (Races in italics indicate fastest lap)

Year	Team	Class	Car	Engine	1	2	3	4	Pos.	Points
2022	Rinaldi Racing	LMP3	Duqueine M30 - D08	Nissan VK50VE 5.0 L V8	DUB; 1; 4	DUB; 2; 4	ABU; 1; 2	ABU; 2; 4	3rd	54
