= Hudson Schwartz =

American racing driver (born 2009)

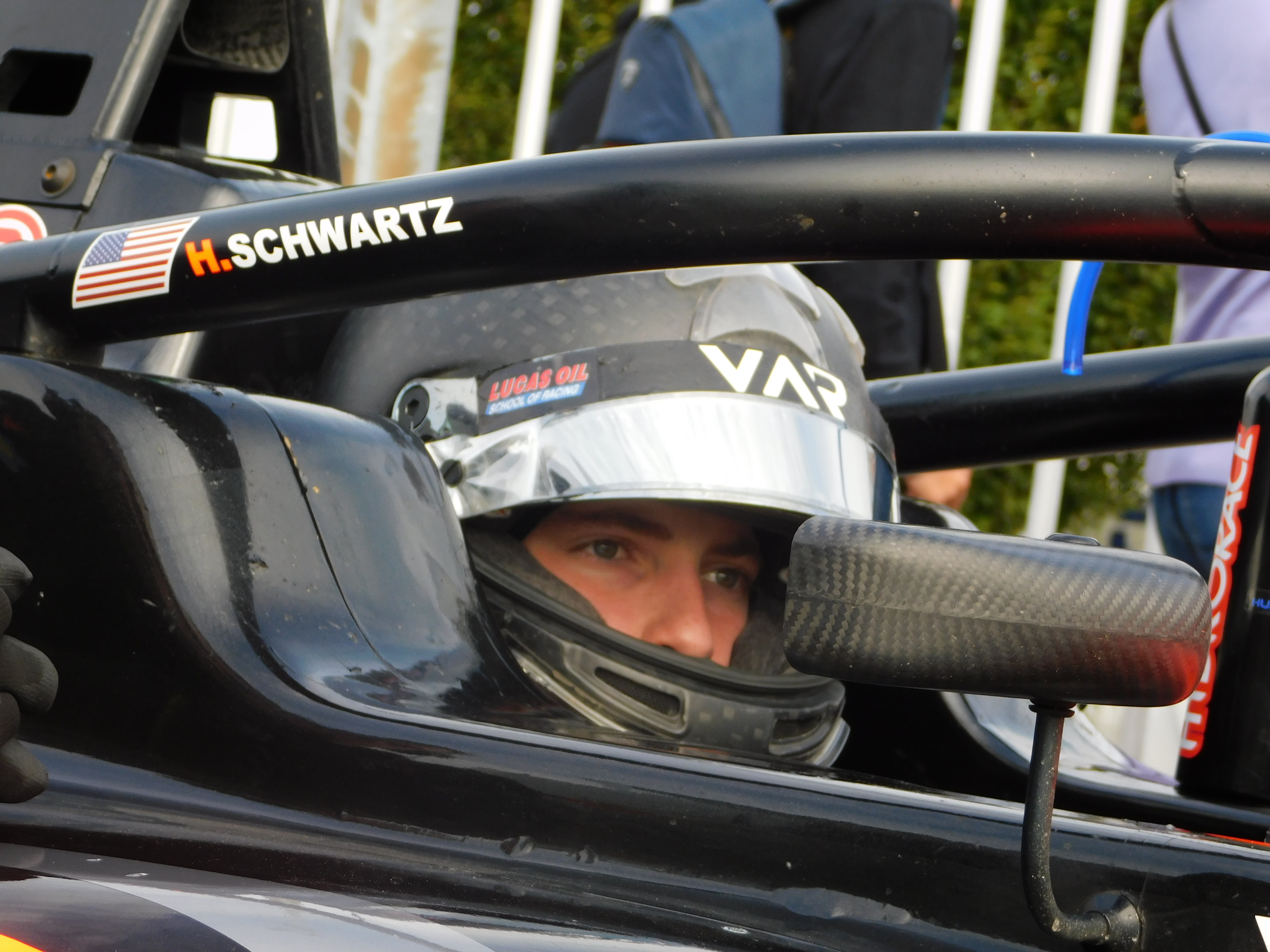
- Schwartz in 2024
- Nationality: (United States) American
- Born: 14 May 2009 (age 17) Washington, D.C., U.S.
- Categorisation: FIA Silver

Championship titles
- 2023: Lucas Oil Formula Car Race Series

Hudson Schwartz (born 14 May 2009) is an American racing driver who last competed in the GT4 European Series and ADAC GT4 Germany for CRT Sport.

== Personal life and karting ==
Schwartz is the son of Roy Schwartz, one of three co-founders of Axios, and an amateur racing driver, who Hudson raced against in the 2022 Lucas Oil Formula Car Race Series.

Schwartz began karting at the age of four and continued karting until 2023, mainly racing for Rolison Performance Group in SKUSA-organized championships.

== Career ==
Schwartz made his full-time single-seater debut in 2023, racing for Velocity Racing Development from Barber onwards. Taking his first podium of the season at Virginia by finishing third in race two, he then took his maiden pole and best result in the following round at Mid-Ohio by finishing second. In the remaining two rounds of the season, Schwartz took one more podium at the season-finale at Circuit of the Americas to end his only season in USF Juniors eighth in points. At the end of the year, Schwartz competed full-time in the Lucas Oil Formula Car Race Series, taking six wins and winning the title and earning $250,000 to put towards his career.

After topping the end of season USF2000 tests, Schwartz made the step-up USF2000 in 2024, joining Pabst Racing for his rookie season in the series. In his only season in the series, Schwartz scored a lone podium in the season-ending Portland round by finishing third in race one, which helped him finish eighth in points. Following that, Schwartz joined Van Amersfoort Racing to race in the final two rounds of the Italian F4 Championship and the final round of the Euro 4 Championship. In those rounds, Schwartz took a best result of 16th at Monza in the former, and two 19th-place finishes in the latter series, albeit at the same venue. Following that, Schwartz made a one-off appearance in the F4 Spanish Championship at Barcelona for Monlau Motorsport. Racing as a guest driver, Schwartz took a best result of tenth among the three races, doing so in race two.

The following year, Schwartz joined MP Motorsport to race in both the Eurocup-4 Spanish Winter and F4 Spanish Championships. In the three-round Winter Championship, Schwartz took a best result of fifth at Jerez and scored points in all but three races to end the winter 15th in the final points standings. In his only full-time season in Spanish F4, Schwartz scored two third-place finishes at Aragón and scored points seven more times to end the year 11th in points. At the end of the year, Schwartz made his debut in the GT4 European Series for Speedy Motorsport at Barcelona, taking a best result of eighth in race one.

Switching to sportscars on a full-time basis for 2026, Schwartz joined CRT Sport for a dual campaign in the GT4 European Series and ADAC GT4 Germany alongside Lucas Cartelle. In the former, Schwartz took a lone win at Le Castellet en route to seventh in the Silver class points. In the latter, Schwartz scored a pair of podiums at the Norisring before taking his first and only win of the season at Oschersleben to end the year fifth overall.

== Karting record ==
=== Karting career summary ===
Season	Series	Team	Position
2021	SKUSA SuperNationals – KA 100 J		23rd
2022	SKUSA SuperNationals – KA 100 J	Speed Concepts Racing	20th
2022	SKUSA SuperNationals – X30 Junior	Speed Concepts Racing	37th

== Racing record ==
=== Racing career summary ===
Season	Series	Team	Races	Wins	Poles	F/Laps	Podiums	Points	Position
2022	Lucas Oil Formula Car Race Series		6	1	?	?	2	178	10th
2023	USF Juniors	Velocity Racing Development	13	0	1	1	3	208	8th
2023	Lucas Oil Formula Car Race Series		15	6	?	?	13	442	**1st**
2024	USF2000 Championship	Pabst Racing	18	0	0	0	1	226	8th
2024	Italian F4 Championship	Van Amersfoort Racing	6	0	0	0	0	0	41st
2024	Euro 4 Championship	Van Amersfoort Racing	3	0	0	0	0	0	35th
2024	F4 Spanish Championship	Monlau Motorsport	3	0	0	0	0	0	NC†
2025	Eurocup-4 Spanish Winter Championship	MP Motorsport	9	0	0	0	0	20	15th
2025	F4 Spanish Championship	KCL by MP Motorsport	21	0	0	0	2	62	11th
2025	GT4 European Series – Silver	Speedy Motorsport	2	0	0	0	0	0	NC†
2025	Supercars Endurance Series – GT4 Pro-Bronze	Speedy Motorsport	2	0	0	0	0	26	NC
2026	GT4 Winter Series – Pro	Speedy Motorsport	3	2	0	0	3	48	8th
2026	GT4 European Series – Silver	CRT Sport	12	1	0	0	2	80	7th
2026	ADAC GT4 Germany	CRT Sport	12	1	0	0	3	123	5th

† As Schwartz was a guest driver, he was ineligible for points

^{*} Season in progress

=== American open-wheel racing results ===
==== USF Juniors ====
(key) (Races in bold indicate pole position) (Races in italics indicate fastest lap) (Races with * indicate most race laps led)

Year	Team	1	2	3	4	5	6	7	8	9	10	11	12	13	14	15	16	Rank	Points
2023	Velocity Racing Development	SEB; 1	SEB; 2	SEB; 3	ALA; 1; 14	ALA; 2; 12	VIR; 1; 7	VIR; 2; 3	VIR; 3; 14	MOH; 1; 5	**MOH**; **2**; 2*	ROA; 1; 5	ROA; 2; 7	ROA; 3; 5	COA; 1; 6	COA; 2; 4	COA; 3; 3	8th	208

==== USF2000 Championship ====
(key) (Races in bold indicate pole position) (Races in italics indicate fastest lap) (Races with * indicate most race laps led)

Year	Team	1	2	3	4	5	6	7	8	9	10	11	12	13	14	15	16	17	18	Rank	Points
2024	Pabst Racing	STP; 1 Ret	STP; 2; 9	NOL; 1; 6	NOL; 2; 4*	NOL; 3; 6	IMS; 1; 20	IMS; 2; 6	IRP; 10	ROA; 1; 7	ROA; 2; 9	MOH; 1; 5	MOH; 2; 10	MOH; 3; 7	TOR; 1; 7	TOR; 2; 7	POR; 1; 3	POR; 2; 17	POR; 3; 13	8th	226

=== Complete Italian F4 Championship results ===
(key) (Races in bold indicate pole position) (Races in italics indicate fastest lap)

Year	Team	1	2	3	4	5	6	7	8	9	10	11	12	13	14	15	16	17	18	19	20	21	DC	Points
2024	Van Amersfoort Racing	MIS; 1	MIS; 2	MIS; 3	IMO; 1	IMO; 2	IMO; 3	VLL; 1	VLL; 2	VLL; 3	MUG; 1	MUG; 2	MUG; 3	LEC; 1	LEC; 2	LEC; 3	CAT; 1; 18	CAT; 2; 24	CAT; 3; 22	MNZ; 1; 22	MNZ; 2; 20	MNZ; 3; 16	41st	0

=== Complete Euro 4 Championship results ===
(key) (Races in bold indicate pole position; races in italics indicate fastest lap)

Year	Team	1	2	3	4	5	6	7	8	9	DC	Points
2024	Van Amersfoort Racing	MUG; 1	MUG; 2	MUG; 3	RBR; 1	RBR; 2	RBR; 3	MNZ; 1; 19	MNZ; 2; 19	MNZ; 3; 23	35th	0

=== Complete F4 Spanish Championship results ===
(key) (Races in bold indicate pole position; races in italics indicate fastest lap)

Year	Team	1	2	3	4	5	6	7	8	9	10	11	12	13	14	15	16	17	18	19	20	21	DC	Points
2024	Monlau Motorsport	JAR; 1	JAR; 2	JAR; 3	POR; 1	POR; 2	POR; 3	LEC; 1	LEC; 2	.LEC; 3	ARA; 1	ARA; 2	ARA; 3	CRT; 1	CRT; 2	CRT; 3	JER; 1	JER; 2	JER; 3	CAT; 1; 13	CAT; 2; 10	CAT; 3; 12	NC†	0
2025	KCL by MP Motorsport	ARA; 1; 3	ARA; 2; 3	ARA; 3; 27	NAV; 1; 9	NAV; 2; 8	NAV; 3; 7	POR; 1; 11	POR; 2; 28	POR; 3; 18	LEC; 1; 8	LEC; 2; 14	LEC; 3; 10	JER; 1; 29†	JER; 2; 5	JER; 3; 13	CRT; 1; 11	CRT; 2; 22	CRT; 3; 7	CAT; 1; 7	CAT; 2; 19	CAT; 3; 15	11th	62

† As Schwartz was a guest driver, he was ineligible for points.

=== Complete Eurocup-4 Spanish Winter Championship results ===
(key) (Races in bold indicate pole position) (Races in italics indicate fastest lap)

Year	Team	1	2	3	4	5	6	7	8	9	DC	Points
2025	MP Motorsport	JER; 1; 5	JER; 2; 9	JER; 3; 19	POR; 1; 9	POR; 2 Ret	POR; 3; 10	NAV; 1; 8	NAV; 2; 8	NAV; 3; 23	15th	20

=== Complete GT4 European Series results ===
(key) (Races in bold indicate pole position) (Races in italics indicate fastest lap)

Year	Team	Car	Class	1	2	3	4	5	6	7	8	9	10	11	12	Pos	Points
2025	Speedy Motorsport	Toyota GR Supra GT4 Evo2	Silver	LEC; 1	LEC; 2	ZAN; 1	ZAN; 2	SPA; 1	SPA; 2	MIS; 1	MIS; 2	NÜR; 1	NÜR; 2	CAT; 1; 8	CAT; 2; 12	NC†	0†
2026	CRT Sport	Toyota GR Supra GT4 Evo2	Silver	LEC; 1 Ret	LEC; 2; 1	MNZ; 1; 3	MNZ; 2; 5	SPA; 1; 37	SPA; 2; 9	MIS; 1; 6	MIS; 2; 6	ZAN; 1 Ret	ZAN; 2; 22	ALG; 1 Ret	ALG; 2; 5	7th	80

=== Complete ADAC GT4 Germany results ===
(key) (Races in bold indicate pole position) (Races in italics indicate fastest lap)

Year	Team	Car	1	2	3	4	5	6	7	8	9	10	11	12	13	DC	Points
2026	CRT Sport	Toyota GR Supra GT4 Evo2	RBR; 1; 4	RBR; 2 Ret	NOR; 1; 3	NOR; 2; 3	OSC; 1; 4	**OSC**; **2**; 1	NÜR; 1; 5	NÜR; 2; 6	SAC; 1; 6	SAC; 2 C	**HOC**; **1** Ret	HOC; 2 Ret	HOC; 3; 7	5th	123
