= 2026 Nürburgring Langstrecken-Serie =

49th season of the German endurance series

The 2026 Nürburgring Langstrecken-Serie was the 49th season of the German endurance series (formerly VLN) run at the Nürburgring Nordschleife, and seventh run as the Nürburgring Langstrecken Serie (NLS). The season began on 14 March and finished on 10 October.

The fourth race was marred by the death of 66-year-old Finnish racing driver Juha Miettinen. An hour into the race, a suspected fluid leak caused a seven-car pile-up at the Klostertal section of the circuit, which included the No. 27 Aston Martin Vantage AMR GT3, No. 111 BMW 325i, No. 410 Porsche Cayman GTS, No. 448 Porsche Cayman CM12, No. 503 Toyota GR Supra, No. 992 Porsche 911 GT3 Cup (992), and Miettinen's No. 121 BMW 325i. All seven drivers were transported to a medical center; Miettinen was pronounced dead following failed resuscitation attempts, while the remaining six drivers sustained minor injuries. His death marked the first driver fatality during a race at the Nürburgring since 2013.

== Calendar ==
The 2026 calendar consists of 10 rounds, still including the two Nürburgring 24 Hours Qualifying Races as part of the season.

In January 2026, VLN moved the date of the NLS2 round forward from 28 March to 21 March, which was reported as allowing Max Verstappen to enter a round in preparation for the 24-hour race.

Rnd.		Race	Length	Circuit	Date
1	NLS1	71. ADAC Westfalenfahrt	4 hours	(Germany) Nürburgring Nordschleife	14 March
2	NLS2	58. ADAC Barbarossapreis	4 hours	(Germany) Nürburgring Nordschleife	21 March
3	NLS3	57. Adenauer ADAC Rundstrecken-Trophy	4 hours	(Germany) Nürburgring Nordschleife	11 April
4	24H-Q1	ADAC 24h Nürburgring Qualifiers Rennen 1	4 hours (Note: The race was red-flagged after 26 minutes following the accident that ultimately claimed the life of Juha Miettinen. It was not restarted.)	(Germany) Nürburgring Nordschleife	18 April
5	24H-Q2	ADAC 24h Nürburgring Qualifiers Rennen 2	4 hours	(Germany) Nürburgring Nordschleife	19 April
6	NLS6	1. ADAC Eifel Trophy	4 hours	(Germany) Nürburgring Nordschleife	20 June
7	NLS7	KW 6h ADAC Ruhr-Pokal-Rennen	6 hours	(Germany) Nürburgring Nordschleife	1 August
8	NLS8	65. ADAC Reinoldus-Langstreckenrennen	4 hours	(Germany) Nürburgring Nordschleife	12 September
9	NLS9	66. ADAC ACAS Cup	4 hours	(Germany) Nürburgring Nordschleife	13 September
10	NLS10	2. NLS Sportwarte-Trophy	4 hours	(Germany) Nürburgring Nordschleife	10 October

== Classes ==
Entries are split into multiple different classes. Current classes are:

	Class
NLS specials
SP3	Purpose-built racecars with an engine capacity between 1750 and 2000 cc.
SP4	Purpose-built racecars with an engine capacity between 2001 and 2500 cc.
SP5	Purpose-built racecars with an engine capacity between 2501 and 3000 cc.
SP6	Purpose-built racecars with an engine capacity between 3001 and 3500 cc.
SP7	Purpose-built racecars with an engine capacity between 3501 and 4000 cc.
SP8	Purpose-built racecars with an engine capacity over 4000 cc.
SP9	For FIA-homologated Group GT3 cars. GT3 sub-classes based on driver ranking system maintained by the FIA.
SP9 Pro, SP9 Pro-Am & SP9 Am	For FIA-homologated Group GT3 cars. GT3 sub-classes based on driver ranking system maintained by the FIA.
SP10	For FIA and SRO-homologated Group GT4 cars. GT4 sub-classes based on driver ranking system.
SP10 Pro, SP10 Am	For FIA and SRO-homologated Group GT4 cars. GT4 sub-classes based on driver ranking system.
SP11	For FIA and SRO-homologated Group GT2 cars. GT2 sub-classes based on driver ranking system.
SP11 Pro, SP11 Pro-Am & SP11 Am	For FIA and SRO-homologated Group GT2 cars. GT2 sub-classes based on driver ranking system.
SP2T	Purpose-built racecars with a turbocharged-engine capacity between 1350 and 1750 cc.
SP3T	Purpose-built racecars with a turbocharged-engine capacity between 1751 and 2000 cc.
SP4T	Purpose-built racecars with a turbocharged-engine capacity between 2001 and 2600 cc.
SP8T	Purpose-built racecars with a turbocharged-engine capacity between 2601 and 4000 cc.
SP-Pro	Prototype racecars with an engine capacity over 3000 cc.
SP-X	'Special vehicles' which do not fit into any other class.
AT(-G)	Vehicles using alternative fuel sources (e.g. electric, LPG, hydrogen, etc.) Cars will be split determined by a pre event BoP.
AT 1 AT 2 AT 3	Vehicles using alternative fuel sources (e.g. electric, LPG, hydrogen, etc.) Cars will be split determined by a pre event BoP.
TCR touring cars
TCR	FIA-homologated TCR Touring Cars.
NLS production cars
V3	Production cars with an engine capacity up to 2000 cc.
V4	Production cars with an engine capacity between 2001 and 2500 cc.
V5	Production cars with an engine capacity between 2501 and 3000 cc.
V6	Production cars with an engine capacity between 3001 and 3500 cc.
VT1	Production cars with a turbocharged-engine with power up to 201 kW (270 hp). Weight-to-power ratio is limited to 7.8 kg/kW (5.8 kg/hp).
VT2-F+4WD	Production cars with front-wheel or four-wheel drive and a turbocharged-engine with power up to 228 kW (306 hp). Weight-to-power ratio is limited to 6.8 kg/kW (5.1 kg/hp) for FWD and 6.65 kg/kW (4.96 kg/hp) for 4WD.
VT2-R	Production cars with rear-wheel drive and a turbocharged-engine with power up to 219 kW (294 hp). Weight-to-power ratio is limited to 7.5 kg/kW (5.6 kg/hp).
VT3	Production cars with a turbocharged-engine with power up to 350 kW (470 hp).
VT Hybrid	Production cars with hybrid power units.
V Elektro	Production cars with electric powertrains.
Porsche Endurance Trophy Nürburgring class cars Cup classes are for single make identical or near identical specification cars
Cup 2	Porsche 992 GT3 Cup cars using Michelin control tyres.
Cup 3	Porsche Cayman GT4 Trophy cars.
Cup Class cars Cup classes are for single make identical or near identical specification cars
M2 Racing	BMW M2 Racing cars.
M240i	BMW M240i Racing Cup cars.
325i	BMW 325i Type E46, E90, E91, E92
Gruppe H historic cars
H2	Pre-2015 production cars and purpose-built racecars with an engine capacity up to 2000 cc.
H4	Pre-2015 production cars and purpose-built racecars with an engine capacity between 2001 and 6250 cc.

== Entry list ==
=== Main classes ===
==== SP9 (Group GT3) ====
Team	Car	Engine	No.	Drivers	Class	Rounds
(Germany) FK Performance Motorsport	BMW M4 GT3 Evo	BMW P58 3.0 L Turbo I6	1	(South Africa) Leyton Fourie	P	7
(Germany) FK Performance Motorsport	BMW M4 GT3 Evo	BMW P58 3.0 L Turbo I6	1	(United Kingdom) Dan Harper	P	7
(Germany) FK Performance Motorsport	BMW M4 GT3 Evo	BMW P58 3.0 L Turbo I6	1	(Bulgaria) Pavel Lefterov	P	7
(Germany) FK Performance Motorsport	BMW M4 GT3 Evo	BMW P58 3.0 L Turbo I6	1	(Netherlands) Maxime Oosten	P	7
(Germany) Team Joos Sportwagentechnik	Porsche 911 GT3 R (992.2)	Porsche M97/80 4.2 L Flat-6	2	(Germany) Michael Joos	Am	7–9
(Germany) Team Joos Sportwagentechnik	Porsche 911 GT3 R (992.2)	Porsche M97/80 4.2 L Flat-6	2	(Germany) Marco Lamsouguer	Am	7–9
(Germany) Team Joos Sportwagentechnik	Porsche 911 GT3 R (992.2)	Porsche M97/80 4.2 L Flat-6	2	(Germany) Fidel Leib	Am	7–9
(Germany) Team Joos Sportwagentechnik	Porsche 911 GT3 R (992.2)	Porsche M97/80 4.2 L Flat-6	2	(Germany) Christopher Brück	PA	10
(Germany) Team Joos Sportwagentechnik	Porsche 911 GT3 R (992.2)	Porsche M97/80 4.2 L Flat-6	2	(Germany) Michael Joos	PA	10
(Germany) Team Joos Sportwagentechnik	Porsche 911 GT3 R (992.2)	Porsche M97/80 4.2 L Flat-6	2	(Germany) Fidel Leib	PA	10
(Netherlands) Mercedes-AMG Team Verstappen Racing	Mercedes-AMG GT3 Evo	Mercedes-AMG M159 6.2 L V8	3	(Andorra) Jules Gounon	P	1–2
(Netherlands) Mercedes-AMG Team Verstappen Racing	Mercedes-AMG GT3 Evo	Mercedes-AMG M159 6.2 L V8	3	(Spain) Daniel Juncadella	P	1–2
(Netherlands) Mercedes-AMG Team Verstappen Racing	Mercedes-AMG GT3 Evo	Mercedes-AMG M159 6.2 L V8	3	(Austria) Lucas Auer	P	1, 4–5
(Netherlands) Mercedes-AMG Team Verstappen Racing	Mercedes-AMG GT3 Evo	Mercedes-AMG M159 6.2 L V8	3	(Netherlands) Max Verstappen	P	2, 4–5
(Germany) Mercedes-AMG Team Ravenol	Mercedes-AMG GT3 Evo	Mercedes-AMG M159 6.2 L V8	80	(Germany) Fabian Schiller	P	1–2, 4–5, 8
(Germany) Mercedes-AMG Team Ravenol	Mercedes-AMG GT3 Evo	Mercedes-AMG M159 6.2 L V8	80	(Belgium) Maxime Martin	P	1–2
(Germany) Mercedes-AMG Team Ravenol	Mercedes-AMG GT3 Evo	Mercedes-AMG M159 6.2 L V8	80	(Germany) Luca Stolz	P	1, 4–5, 7
(Germany) Mercedes-AMG Team Ravenol	Mercedes-AMG GT3 Evo	Mercedes-AMG M159 6.2 L V8	80	(Germany) Maro Engel	P	1, 4–5
(Germany) Mercedes-AMG Team Ravenol	Mercedes-AMG GT3 Evo	Mercedes-AMG M159 6.2 L V8	80	(Estonia) Ralf Aron	P	7
(Germany) Mercedes-AMG Team Ravenol	Mercedes-AMG GT3 Evo	Mercedes-AMG M159 6.2 L V8	80	(Germany) Jay Mo Härtling	P	8
(Armenia) Goroyan RT by Car Collection (No. 4) (Germany) Car Collection Motorsport (No. 22)	Porsche 911 GT3 R (992.2)	Porsche M97/80 4.2 L Flat-6	4	(Armenia) Artur Goroyan	PA	1, 3–5, 7
(Armenia) Goroyan RT by Car Collection (No. 4) (Germany) Car Collection Motorsport (No. 22)	Porsche 911 GT3 R (992.2)	Porsche M97/80 4.2 L Flat-6	4	(Kyrgyzstan) Oleg Kvitka (Note: Veremenko and "Selv" are Russian, but they compete under German license as Russian national emblems were banned by the FIA following the Russian invasion of Ukraine. Kvitka, also a Russian, competes under a Kyrgyzstani license for the same reason.)	PA	1, 3–5
(Armenia) Goroyan RT by Car Collection (No. 4) (Germany) Car Collection Motorsport (No. 22)	Porsche 911 GT3 R (992.2)	Porsche M97/80 4.2 L Flat-6	4	(Switzerland) Alex Fontana	PA	1, 7
(Armenia) Goroyan RT by Car Collection (No. 4) (Germany) Car Collection Motorsport (No. 22)	Porsche 911 GT3 R (992.2)	Porsche M97/80 4.2 L Flat-6	4	(France) Nathanaël Berthon	PA	3–5
(Armenia) Goroyan RT by Car Collection (No. 4) (Germany) Car Collection Motorsport (No. 22)	Porsche 911 GT3 R (992.2)	Porsche M97/80 4.2 L Flat-6	4	(Germany) Nico Menzel	PA	7
(Armenia) Goroyan RT by Car Collection (No. 4) (Germany) Car Collection Motorsport (No. 22)	Audi R8 LMS Evo II	Audi DAR 5.2 L V10	22	(Germany) Florian Spengler	PA	8–9
(Armenia) Goroyan RT by Car Collection (No. 4) (Germany) Car Collection Motorsport (No. 22)	Audi R8 LMS Evo II	Audi DAR 5.2 L V10	22	(Germany) Nico Hantke	PA	8–9
(Armenia) Goroyan RT by Car Collection (No. 4) (Germany) Car Collection Motorsport (No. 22)	Audi R8 LMS Evo II	Audi DAR 5.2 L V10	22	(Germany) Christer Jöns	PA	8–9
(Germany) Black Falcon Team EAE	Porsche 911 GT3 R (992.2)	Porsche M97/80 4.2 L Flat-6	5	(Turkey) Mustafa-Mehmet Kaya	Am	2–9
(Germany) Black Falcon Team EAE	Porsche 911 GT3 R (992.2)	Porsche M97/80 4.2 L Flat-6	5	(Germany) Mike Stursberg	Am	2–9
(Germany) Black Falcon Team EAE	Porsche 911 GT3 R (992.2)	Porsche M97/80 4.2 L Flat-6	5	(Italy) Gabriele Piana	Am	2, 4–7
(Germany) Black Falcon Team EAE	Porsche 911 GT3 R (992.2)	Porsche M97/80 4.2 L Flat-6	5	(Netherlands) Daan Arrow	Am	3, 8–9
(Germany) Black Falcon Team EAE	Porsche 911 GT3 R (992.2)	Porsche M97/80 4.2 L Flat-6	5	(Germany) Thomas Kiefer	Am	4–5
(Germany) 48LOSCH Motorsport by Black Falcon	Porsche 911 GT3 R (992.2)	Porsche M97/80 4.2 L Flat-6	48	(Germany) Patrick Assenheimer	PA	1–2, 4–10
(Germany) 48LOSCH Motorsport by Black Falcon	Porsche 911 GT3 R (992.2)	Porsche M97/80 4.2 L Flat-6	48	(Germany) Tobias Müller	PA	1–2, 4–10
(Germany) 48LOSCH Motorsport by Black Falcon	Porsche 911 GT3 R (992.2)	Porsche M97/80 4.2 L Flat-6	48	(Luxembourg) Dylan Pereira	PA	1–2, 4–10
(Germany) 48LOSCH Motorsport by Black Falcon	Porsche 911 GT3 R (992.2)	Porsche M97/80 4.2 L Flat-6	48	(Netherlands) Daan Arrow	PA	4–5
(Germany) SP Racing Cologne Schmickler Performance	Audi R8 LMS Evo II	Audi DAR 5.2 L V10	6	(Germany) Pierre Lemmerz	Am	6–8
(Germany) SP Racing Cologne Schmickler Performance	Audi R8 LMS Evo II	Audi DAR 5.2 L V10	6	(Germany) Alexander Kroker	Am	6–7
(Germany) SP Racing Cologne Schmickler Performance	Audi R8 LMS Evo II	Audi DAR 5.2 L V10	6	(Germany) Andreas Ziegler	Am	7
(Germany) SP Racing Cologne Schmickler Performance	Audi R8 LMS Evo II	Audi DAR 5.2 L V10	6	(Germany) Lutz Obermann	Am	8
(Austria) Konrad Motorsport	Lamborghini Huracán GT3 Evo 1, 10; Lamborghini Huracán GT3 Evo 2 2–5	Lamborghini DGF 5.2 L V10	7	(Germany) Christian Engelhart	P	1–3
(Austria) Konrad Motorsport	Lamborghini Huracán GT3 Evo 1, 10; Lamborghini Huracán GT3 Evo 2 2–5	Lamborghini DGF 5.2 L V10	7	(Germany) Maximilian Paul	P	1–2
(Austria) Konrad Motorsport	Lamborghini Huracán GT3 Evo 1, 10; Lamborghini Huracán GT3 Evo 2 2–5	Lamborghini DGF 5.2 L V10	7	(Latvia) Patricija Stalidzāne	P	2–3
(Austria) Konrad Motorsport	Lamborghini Huracán GT3 Evo 1, 10; Lamborghini Huracán GT3 Evo 2 2–5	Lamborghini DGF 5.2 L V10	7	(Bulgaria) Pavel Lefterov	P	3
(Austria) Konrad Motorsport	Lamborghini Huracán GT3 Evo 1, 10; Lamborghini Huracán GT3 Evo 2 2–5	Lamborghini DGF 5.2 L V10	7	(Bulgaria) Pavel Lefterov	PA	4–5, 10
(Austria) Konrad Motorsport	Lamborghini Huracán GT3 Evo 1, 10; Lamborghini Huracán GT3 Evo 2 2–5	Lamborghini DGF 5.2 L V10	7	(Germany) Maximilian Paul	PA	4–5
(Austria) Konrad Motorsport	Lamborghini Huracán GT3 Evo 1, 10; Lamborghini Huracán GT3 Evo 2 2–5	Lamborghini DGF 5.2 L V10	7	(Latvia) Patricija Stalidzāne	PA	4–5
(Austria) Konrad Motorsport	Lamborghini Huracán GT3 Evo 1, 10; Lamborghini Huracán GT3 Evo 2 2–5	Lamborghini DGF 5.2 L V10	7	(Bulgaria) Dimitar Balev	PA	10
(Austria) Konrad Motorsport	Lamborghini Huracán GT3 Evo 1, 10; Lamborghini Huracán GT3 Evo 2 2–5	Lamborghini DGF 5.2 L V10	7	(Bulgaria) Aleks Stefanov	PA	10
(Austria) Konrad Motorsport	Lamborghini Huracán GT3 Evo 1, 10; Lamborghini Huracán GT3 Evo 2 2–5	Lamborghini DGF 5.2 L V10	7	(United Kingdom) Daniel Weston	PA	10
(Lithuania) Juta Racing	Audi R8 LMS Evo II	Audi DAR 5.2 L V10	8	(Germany) Alexey Veremenko	PA	6
(Lithuania) Juta Racing	Audi R8 LMS Evo II	Audi DAR 5.2 L V10	8	(Germany) "Selv"	PA	6
(Lithuania) Juta Racing	Audi R8 LMS Evo II	Audi DAR 5.2 L V10	8	(Germany) Frank Stippler	PA	6
(Lithuania) Juta Racing	Audi R8 LMS Evo II	Audi DAR 5.2 L V10	8	(Germany) Alexey Veremenko	Am	1–2, 4–5, 7–8, 10
(Lithuania) Juta Racing	Audi R8 LMS Evo II	Audi DAR 5.2 L V10	8	(Kyrgyzstan) "Selv"	Am	1–2, 4–5, 7–8, 10
(Lithuania) Juta Racing	Audi R8 LMS Evo II	Audi DAR 5.2 L V10	9; 71 (Note: Alternate number used during the 24h Nürburgring Qualifiers races.)	(Germany) Otto Blank	PA	3–5
(Lithuania) Juta Racing	Audi R8 LMS Evo II	Audi DAR 5.2 L V10	9; 71	(Germany) Björn Grossmann	PA	3–5
(Lithuania) Juta Racing	Audi R8 LMS Evo II	Audi DAR 5.2 L V10	9; 71	(Germany) Pierre Kaffer	PA	3
(Lithuania) Juta Racing	Audi R8 LMS Evo II	Audi DAR 5.2 L V10	9; 71	(Germany) Christer Jöns	PA	4–5
(Germany) Schnitzelalm Racing	Mercedes-AMG GT3 Evo	Mercedes-AMG M159 6.2 L V8	11	(Germany) Jay Mo Härtling	PA	4–5
(Germany) Schnitzelalm Racing	Mercedes-AMG GT3 Evo	Mercedes-AMG M159 6.2 L V8	11	(Germany) Kenneth Heyer	PA	4–5
(Germany) Schnitzelalm Racing	Mercedes-AMG GT3 Evo	Mercedes-AMG M159 6.2 L V8	11	(Germany) Jannes Fittje	PA	4–5
(Germany) SR Motorsport by Schnitzelalm	Mercedes-AMG GT3 Evo	Mercedes-AMG M159 6.2 L V8	21	(Germany) Jay Mo Härtling	PA	10
(Germany) SR Motorsport by Schnitzelalm	Mercedes-AMG GT3 Evo	Mercedes-AMG M159 6.2 L V8	21	(Germany) Jannes Fittje	PA	10
(Germany) SR Motorsport by Schnitzelalm	Mercedes-AMG GT3 Evo	Mercedes-AMG M159 6.2 L V8	21	(Germany) Tim Neuser	PA	10
(Germany) Team-RaceIng	Audi R8 LMS Evo II	Audi DAR 5.2 L V10	14	(United Kingdom) Leonidas Karavasili	PA	8–9
(Germany) Team-RaceIng	Audi R8 LMS Evo II	Audi DAR 5.2 L V10	14	(United Kingdom) Samuel Harrison	PA	8–9
(Germany) Team-RaceIng	Audi R8 LMS Evo II	Audi DAR 5.2 L V10	14	(Finland) Miika Panu	PA	8–9
(Germany) Scherer Sport PHX	Audi R8 LMS Evo II	Audi DAR 5.2 L V10	16	(Germany) Christopher Haase	P	2, 4–5
(Germany) Scherer Sport PHX	Audi R8 LMS Evo II	Audi DAR 5.2 L V10	16	(Germany) Nico Hantke	P	2
(Germany) Scherer Sport PHX	Audi R8 LMS Evo II	Audi DAR 5.2 L V10	16	(United Kingdom) Alexander Sims	P	4–5
(Germany) Scherer Sport PHX	Audi R8 LMS Evo II	Audi DAR 5.2 L V10	16	(United Kingdom) Ben Green	P	4–5
(Germany) Dunlop Motorsports	Porsche 911 GT3 R (992.2)	Porsche M97/80 4.2 L Flat-6	17	(Germany) Nico Menzel	P	1–2, 6, 8–10
(Germany) Dunlop Motorsports	Porsche 911 GT3 R (992.2)	Porsche M97/80 4.2 L Flat-6	17	(France) Julien Andlauer	P	1
(Germany) Dunlop Motorsports	Porsche 911 GT3 R (992.2)	Porsche M97/80 4.2 L Flat-6	17	(France) Dorian Boccolacci	P	2, 4–5
(Germany) Dunlop Motorsports	Porsche 911 GT3 R (992.2)	Porsche M97/80 4.2 L Flat-6	17	(Belgium) Alessio Picariello	P	4–5
(Germany) Dunlop Motorsports	Porsche 911 GT3 R (992.2)	Porsche M97/80 4.2 L Flat-6	17	(Germany) Sven Müller	P	6, 10
(Germany) Dunlop Motorsports	Porsche 911 GT3 R (992.2)	Porsche M97/80 4.2 L Flat-6	17	(Netherlands) Flynt Schuring	P	8–9
(Germany) Falken Motorsports	Porsche 911 GT3 R (992.2)	Porsche M97/80 4.2 L Flat-6	44	(Austria) Klaus Bachler	P	1, 3, 6
(Germany) Falken Motorsports	Porsche 911 GT3 R (992.2)	Porsche M97/80 4.2 L Flat-6	44	(Netherlands) Morris Schuring	P	1, 4–5, 8–9
(Germany) Falken Motorsports	Porsche 911 GT3 R (992.2)	Porsche M97/80 4.2 L Flat-6	44	(Germany) Tim Heinemann	P	2, 4–6, 8–10
(Germany) Falken Motorsports	Porsche 911 GT3 R (992.2)	Porsche M97/80 4.2 L Flat-6	44	(Germany) Sven Müller	P	2, 4–6, 10
(Germany) Falken Motorsports	Porsche 911 GT3 R (992.2)	Porsche M97/80 4.2 L Flat-6	44	(Germany) Benjamin Leuchter	P	3
(Germany) Lionspeed GP	Porsche 911 GT3 R (992.2)	Porsche M97/80 4.2 L Flat-6	18	(United Kingdom) Jake Hill	PA	4–5
(Germany) Lionspeed GP	Porsche 911 GT3 R (992.2)	Porsche M97/80 4.2 L Flat-6	18	(Germany) Patrick Kolb	PA	4–5
(Germany) Lionspeed GP	Porsche 911 GT3 R (992.2)	Porsche M97/80 4.2 L Flat-6	18	(United Kingdom) Kyle Tilley	PA	4–5
(Germany) Lionspeed GP	Porsche 911 GT3 R (992.2)	Porsche M97/80 4.2 L Flat-6	24	(Germany) Patrick Kolb	P	1
(United States) Era Motorsport	Mercedes-AMG GT3 Evo	Mercedes-AMG M159 6.2 L V8	20	(United Kingdom) Adam Christodoulou	PA	7
(United States) Era Motorsport	Mercedes-AMG GT3 Evo	Mercedes-AMG M159 6.2 L V8	20	(United Kingdom) Jake Hill	PA	7
(United States) Era Motorsport	Mercedes-AMG GT3 Evo	Mercedes-AMG M159 6.2 L V8	20	(United Kingdom) Kyle Tilley	PA	7
(Slovakia) Gamota Racing	BMW M4 GT3 Evo	BMW P58 3.0 L Turbo I6	23	(Germany) David Jahn	PA	All
(Slovakia) Gamota Racing	BMW M4 GT3 Evo	BMW P58 3.0 L Turbo I6	23	(Germany) Moritz Kranz	PA	All
(Slovakia) Gamota Racing	BMW M4 GT3 Evo	BMW P58 3.0 L Turbo I6	23	(Slovakia) Antal Zsigó	PA	All
(Slovakia) Gamota Racing	BMW M4 GT3 Evo	BMW P58 3.0 L Turbo I6	23	(Germany) Felipe Fernández Laser	PA	7
(Slovakia) Gamota Racing	BMW M4 GT3 Evo	BMW P58 3.0 L Turbo I6	36	(Germany) Dennis Fetzer	Am	10
(Slovakia) Gamota Racing	BMW M4 GT3 Evo	BMW P58 3.0 L Turbo I6	36	(Slovakia) Antal Zsigó	Am	10
(Slovakia) Gamota Racing	BMW M4 GT3 Evo	BMW P58 3.0 L Turbo I6	36	(Hungary) Csaba Walter	Am	10
(Germany) Dörr Motorsport	McLaren 720S GT3 Evo	McLaren M840T 4.0 L Turbo V8	25	(Germany) Ben Dörr	PA	7
(Germany) Dörr Motorsport	McLaren 720S GT3 Evo	McLaren M840T 4.0 L Turbo V8	25	(Germany) Phil Dörr	PA	7
(Germany) Dörr Motorsport	McLaren 720S GT3 Evo	McLaren M840T 4.0 L Turbo V8	25	(Germany) Volker Strycek	PA	7
(Germany) Dörr Motorsport	McLaren 720S GT3 Evo	McLaren M840T 4.0 L Turbo V8	69	(Germany) Ben Dörr	P	4–5
(Germany) Dörr Motorsport	McLaren 720S GT3 Evo	McLaren M840T 4.0 L Turbo V8	69	(Germany) Volker Strycek	P	4–5
(Germany) Dörr Motorsport	McLaren 720S GT3 Evo	McLaren M840T 4.0 L Turbo V8	69	(Germany) Timo Glock	P	4–5
(Germany) Dörr Motorsport	McLaren 720S GT3 Evo	McLaren M840T 4.0 L Turbo V8	69	(Germany) Timo Scheider	P	4–5
(Germany) PROsport Racing Team Bilstein	Mercedes-AMG GT3 Evo	Mercedes-AMG M159 6.2 L V8	26	(United Kingdom) Adam Christodoulou	P	4–5
(Germany) PROsport Racing Team Bilstein	Mercedes-AMG GT3 Evo	Mercedes-AMG M159 6.2 L V8	26	(Canada) Mikaël Grenier	P	4–5
(Germany) PROsport Racing Team Bilstein	Mercedes-AMG GT3 Evo	Mercedes-AMG M159 6.2 L V8	26	(United Kingdom) Chris Lulham	P	4–5
(Germany) PROsport Racing Team Bilstein	Mercedes-AMG GT3 Evo	Mercedes-AMG M159 6.2 L V8	26	(United Kingdom) Adam Christodoulou	PA	6, 10
(Germany) PROsport Racing Team Bilstein	Mercedes-AMG GT3 Evo	Mercedes-AMG M159 6.2 L V8	26	(United Kingdom) Jake Hill	PA	6
(Germany) PROsport Racing Team Bilstein	Mercedes-AMG GT3 Evo	Mercedes-AMG M159 6.2 L V8	26	(United Kingdom) Kyle Tilley	PA	6
(Germany) PROsport Racing Team Bilstein	Mercedes-AMG GT3 Evo	Mercedes-AMG M159 6.2 L V8	26	(Belgium) Simon Balcaen	PA	7
(Germany) PROsport Racing Team Bilstein	Mercedes-AMG GT3 Evo	Mercedes-AMG M159 6.2 L V8	26	(France) Steven Palette	PA	7, 10
(Germany) PROsport Racing Team Bilstein	Mercedes-AMG GT3 Evo	Mercedes-AMG M159 6.2 L V8	26	(Germany) Marek Böckmann	PA	10
(Germany) PROsport-Racing	Aston Martin Vantage AMR GT3	Aston Martin AMR16A 4.0 L Turbo V8	27	(Germany) Marek Böckmann	Am	4–5
(Germany) PROsport-Racing	Aston Martin Vantage AMR GT3	Aston Martin AMR16A 4.0 L Turbo V8	27	(Belgium) Maxime Dumarey	Am	4–5
(Germany) PROsport-Racing	Aston Martin Vantage AMR GT3	Aston Martin AMR16A 4.0 L Turbo V8	27	(Germany) Maik Rönnefarth	Am	4–5
(Germany) PROsport-Racing	Aston Martin Vantage AMR GT3	Aston Martin AMR16A 4.0 L Turbo V8	27	(Germany) Tobias Wahl	Am	4–5
(Germany) PROsport-Racing	Aston Martin Vantage AMR GT3	Aston Martin AMR16A 4.0 L Turbo V8	37	(Belgium) Guido Dumarey	PA	8–9
(Germany) PROsport-Racing	Aston Martin Vantage AMR GT3	Aston Martin AMR16A 4.0 L Turbo V8	37	(Belgium) Maxime Dumarey	PA	8–9
(Germany) PROsport-Racing	Aston Martin Vantage AMR GT3	Aston Martin AMR16A 4.0 L Turbo V8	37	(United Kingdom) Adam Christodoulou	PA	8–9
(Germany) PROsport-Racing	Aston Martin Vantage AMR GT3	Aston Martin AMR16A 4.0 L Turbo V8	37	(Belgium) Guido Dumarey	Am	1–7, 10
(Germany) PROsport-Racing	Aston Martin Vantage AMR GT3	Aston Martin AMR16A 4.0 L Turbo V8	37	(Belgium) Maxime Dumarey	Am	1–7, 10
(Germany) PROsport-Racing	Aston Martin Vantage AMR GT3	Aston Martin AMR16A 4.0 L Turbo V8	37	(Germany) Marek Böckmann	Am	2, 6–7
(Germany) PROsport-Racing	Aston Martin Vantage AMR GT3	Aston Martin AMR16A 4.0 L Turbo V8	37	(Germany) Markus Lönnroth	Am	3–5
(Germany) PROsport-Racing	Aston Martin Vantage AMR GT3	Aston Martin AMR16A 4.0 L Turbo V8	37	(Germany) Tobias Wahl	Am	4–5
(Germany) PROsport-Racing	Aston Martin Vantage AMR GT3	Aston Martin AMR16A 4.0 L Turbo V8	37	(Germany) Hugo Sasse	Am	10
(South Korea) Hankook Competition	Porsche 911 GT3 R (992.2)	Porsche M97/80 4.2 L Flat-6	30	(South Korea) Kim Jong-Kyum	P	6
(South Korea) Hankook Competition	Porsche 911 GT3 R (992.2)	Porsche M97/80 4.2 L Flat-6	30	(Netherlands) Récardo Bruins Choi	P	6
(South Korea) Hankook Competition	Porsche 911 GT3 R (992.2)	Porsche M97/80 4.2 L Flat-6	30	(Denmark) Michael Klitgaard Christensen	P	6
(South Korea) Hankook Competition	Porsche 911 GT3 R (992.2)	Porsche M97/80 4.2 L Flat-6	30	(Canada) Steven Cho	PA	2, 4–5, 10
(South Korea) Hankook Competition	Porsche 911 GT3 R (992.2)	Porsche M97/80 4.2 L Flat-6	30	(South Korea) Kim Jong-Kyum	PA	2, 4–5, 10
(South Korea) Hankook Competition	Porsche 911 GT3 R (992.2)	Porsche M97/80 4.2 L Flat-6	30	(Netherlands) Récardo Bruins Choi	PA	2, 4–5, 10
(South Korea) Hankook Competition	Porsche 911 GT3 R (992.2)	Porsche M97/80 4.2 L Flat-6	30	(Germany) Marco Seefried	PA	2, 4–5
(Germany) Toyo Tires with Ring Racing	Mercedes-AMG GT3 Evo	Mercedes-AMG M159 6.2 L V8	32	(Germany) Andreas Gülden	PA	All
(Germany) Toyo Tires with Ring Racing	Mercedes-AMG GT3 Evo	Mercedes-AMG M159 6.2 L V8	32	(Japan) Yuichi Nakayama	PA	All
(Germany) Toyo Tires with Ring Racing	Mercedes-AMG GT3 Evo	Mercedes-AMG M159 6.2 L V8	32	(Germany) Tim Sandtler	PA	All
(Germany) Toyo Tires with Ring Racing	Mercedes-AMG GT3 Evo	Mercedes-AMG M159 6.2 L V8	32	(France) Giuliano Alesi	PA	8–9
(Germany) Kkrämer Racing	Audi R8 LMS Evo II	Audi DAR 5.2 L V10	33	(Germany) Michele di Martino	PA	1–5
(Germany) Kkrämer Racing	Audi R8 LMS Evo II	Audi DAR 5.2 L V10	33	(Germany) Fidel Leib	PA	1–5
(Germany) Kkrämer Racing	Audi R8 LMS Evo II	Audi DAR 5.2 L V10	33	(Germany) Tobias Vazquez-Garcia	PA	1–5
(Germany) Kkrämer Racing	Audi R8 LMS Evo II	Audi DAR 5.2 L V10	33	(Germany) Christopher Brück	PA	2
(Germany) Kkrämer Racing	Audi R8 LMS Evo II	Audi DAR 5.2 L V10	33	(Germany) Karsten Krämer	PA	4–5
(Germany) Kkrämer Racing	Audi R8 LMS Evo II	Audi DAR 5.2 L V10	33	(Germany) Michele di Martino	Am	6, 8–10
(Germany) Kkrämer Racing	Audi R8 LMS Evo II	Audi DAR 5.2 L V10	33	(Germany) Fidel Leib	Am	6
(Germany) Kkrämer Racing	Audi R8 LMS Evo II	Audi DAR 5.2 L V10	33	(Germany) Tobias Wahl	Am	6
(Germany) Kkrämer Racing	Audi R8 LMS Evo II	Audi DAR 5.2 L V10	33	(Germany) Karsten Krämer	Am	8–10
(Germany) Kkrämer Racing	Audi R8 LMS Evo II	Audi DAR 5.2 L V10	33	(Germany) Peter Sander	Am	8–10
(Germany) Kkrämer Racing	Audi R8 LMS Evo II	Audi DAR 5.2 L V10	33	(France) Leo Messenger	Am	8
(Germany) Walkenhorst Motorsport	Aston Martin Vantage AMR GT3 Evo	Aston Martin AMR16A 4.0 L Turbo V8	34	(Norway) Christian Krognes	P	1–2, 4–5
(Germany) Walkenhorst Motorsport	Aston Martin Vantage AMR GT3 Evo	Aston Martin AMR16A 4.0 L Turbo V8	34	(Italy) Mattia Drudi	P	1–2
(Germany) Walkenhorst Motorsport	Aston Martin Vantage AMR GT3 Evo	Aston Martin AMR16A 4.0 L Turbo V8	34	(Denmark) Nicki Thiim	P	4–5
(Germany) Walkenhorst Motorsport	Aston Martin Vantage AMR GT3 Evo	Aston Martin AMR16A 4.0 L Turbo V8	35	(Norway) Christian Krognes	P	6–7, 10
(Germany) Walkenhorst Motorsport	Aston Martin Vantage AMR GT3 Evo	Aston Martin AMR16A 4.0 L Turbo V8	35	(Ecuador) Mateo Villagomez	P	6, 10
(Germany) Walkenhorst Motorsport	Aston Martin Vantage AMR GT3 Evo	Aston Martin AMR16A 4.0 L Turbo V8	35	(Germany) Dennis Fetzer	P	7
(Germany) Walkenhorst Motorsport	Aston Martin Vantage AMR GT3 Evo	Aston Martin AMR16A 4.0 L Turbo V8	35	(Germany) Dennis Fetzer	PA	1–2, 4–5, 8–9
(Germany) Walkenhorst Motorsport	Aston Martin Vantage AMR GT3 Evo	Aston Martin AMR16A 4.0 L Turbo V8	35	(Ecuador) Mateo Villagomez	PA	1–2, 4–5, 8–9
(Germany) Walkenhorst Motorsport	Aston Martin Vantage AMR GT3 Evo	Aston Martin AMR16A 4.0 L Turbo V8	35	(Germany) Felipe Fernández Laser	PA	1–2, 4–5
(Germany) Walkenhorst Motorsport	Aston Martin Vantage AMR GT3 Evo	Aston Martin AMR16A 4.0 L Turbo V8	35	(Germany) Stefan Aust	PA	4–5
(Germany) Walkenhorst Motorsport	Aston Martin Vantage AMR GT3 Evo	Aston Martin AMR16A 4.0 L Turbo V8	35	(Norway) Christian Krognes	PA	8–9
(Germany) Walkenhorst Motorsport	Aston Martin Vantage AMR GT3 Evo	Aston Martin AMR16A 4.0 L Turbo V8	39	(Norway) Anders Buchardt	PA	4–5
(Germany) Walkenhorst Motorsport	Aston Martin Vantage AMR GT3 Evo	Aston Martin AMR16A 4.0 L Turbo V8	39	(Germany) Nico Hantke	PA	4–5
(Germany) Walkenhorst Motorsport	Aston Martin Vantage AMR GT3 Evo	Aston Martin AMR16A 4.0 L Turbo V8	39	(Netherlands) Mex Jansen	PA	4–5
(Germany) Walkenhorst Motorsport	Aston Martin Vantage AMR GT3 Evo	Aston Martin AMR16A 4.0 L Turbo V8	39	(Germany) Henry Walkenhorst	PA	4–5
(Germany) Saugmotoren Motorsport	BMW Z4 GT3	BMW P65B44 4.4 L V8	36	(Germany) Julian Reeh	Am	4–5
(Germany) Saugmotoren Motorsport	BMW Z4 GT3	BMW P65B44 4.4 L V8	36	(Germany) Ralf Schall	Am	4–5
(Germany) Saugmotoren Motorsport	BMW Z4 GT3	BMW P65B44 4.4 L V8	36	(Germany) Christian Scherer	Am	4–5
(Germany) Saugmotoren Motorsport	BMW Z4 GT3	BMW P65B44 4.4 L V8	36	(Germany) Henry Walkenhorst	Am	4–5
(Netherlands) Koopman Racing	BMW Z4 GT3	BMW P65B44 4.4 L V8	40	(Germany) Peter Posavac	Am	3
(Netherlands) Koopman Racing	BMW Z4 GT3	BMW P65B44 4.4 L V8	40	(Germany) Michael Funke	Am	3
(Netherlands) Koopman Racing	BMW Z4 GT3	BMW P65B44 4.4 L V8	40	(Germany) Frank Nikolaus	Am	3
(Japan) Realize Kondo Racing with Rinaldi	Ferrari 296 GT3 Evo	Ferrari F163CE 3.0 L Turbo V6	45	(Netherlands) Thierry Vermeulen	P	1–2, 4–5
(Japan) Realize Kondo Racing with Rinaldi	Ferrari 296 GT3 Evo	Ferrari F163CE 3.0 L Turbo V6	45	(France) Thomas Neubauer	P	1–2
(Japan) Realize Kondo Racing with Rinaldi	Ferrari 296 GT3 Evo	Ferrari F163CE 3.0 L Turbo V6	45	(Germany) Dennis Marschall	P	1, 4–5
(Japan) Realize Kondo Racing with Rinaldi	Ferrari 296 GT3 Evo	Ferrari F163CE 3.0 L Turbo V6	45	(South Africa) David Perel	P	2, 4–5
(Hong Kong) KCMG	Mercedes-AMG GT3 Evo	Mercedes-AMG M159 6.2 L V8	47	(Finland) Jesse Krohn	P	2–5
(Hong Kong) KCMG	Mercedes-AMG GT3 Evo	Mercedes-AMG M159 6.2 L V8	47	(United Kingdom) David Pittard	P	2–5
(Hong Kong) KCMG	Mercedes-AMG GT3 Evo	Mercedes-AMG M159 6.2 L V8	47	(Japan) Nirei Fukuzumi	P	2, 4–6, 9
(Hong Kong) KCMG	Mercedes-AMG GT3 Evo	Mercedes-AMG M159 6.2 L V8	47	(Japan) Sho Tsuboi	P	2, 9
(Hong Kong) KCMG	Mercedes-AMG GT3 Evo	Mercedes-AMG M159 6.2 L V8	47	(Japan) Kamui Kobayashi	P	3, 6, 8
(Hong Kong) KCMG	Mercedes-AMG GT3 Evo	Mercedes-AMG M159 6.2 L V8	47	(Italy) Edoardo Liberati	P	3
(Hong Kong) KCMG	Mercedes-AMG GT3 Evo	Mercedes-AMG M159 6.2 L V8	47	(Japan) Naoya Gamou	P	4–6, 8
(Germany) équipe vitesse	Audi R8 LMS Evo II	Audi DAR 5.2 L V10	50	(Germany) Michael Heimrich	Am	4–10
(Germany) équipe vitesse	Audi R8 LMS Evo II	Audi DAR 5.2 L V10	50	(Germany) Arno Klasen	Am	4–10
(Germany) équipe vitesse	Audi R8 LMS Evo II	Audi DAR 5.2 L V10	50	(Italy) Lorenzo Rocco di Torrepadula	Am	4–5, 8–9
(Germany) équipe vitesse	Audi R8 LMS Evo II	Audi DAR 5.2 L V10	50	(Belgium) Aris Balanian	Am	6–9
(Italy) Dinamic GT	Porsche 911 GT3 R (992.2)	Porsche M97/80 4.2 L Flat-6	54	(Italy) Michele Beretta	P	1–2, 4–5
(Italy) Dinamic GT	Porsche 911 GT3 R (992.2)	Porsche M97/80 4.2 L Flat-6	54	(Denmark) Michael Christensen	P	1, 4–5, 8–9
(Italy) Dinamic GT	Porsche 911 GT3 R (992.2)	Porsche M97/80 4.2 L Flat-6	54	(Denmark) Bastian Buus	P	1
(Italy) Dinamic GT	Porsche 911 GT3 R (992.2)	Porsche M97/80 4.2 L Flat-6	54	(Germany) Joel Sturm	P	2, 4–5
(Italy) Dinamic GT	Porsche 911 GT3 R (992.2)	Porsche M97/80 4.2 L Flat-6	54	(Netherlands) Loek Hartog	P	2, 8–9
(Italy) Dinamic GT	Porsche 911 GT3 R (992.2)	Porsche M97/80 4.2 L Flat-6	54	(France) Alessandro Ghiretti	P	4–5
(Italy) Dinamic GT	Porsche 911 GT3 R (992.2)	Porsche M97/80 4.2 L Flat-6	54	(France) Loris Cabirou Gomez	P	9
(Germany) HRT Ford Racing	Ford Mustang GT3 Evo	Ford Coyote 5.4 L V8	64	(Germany) Vincent Kolb	P	1, 7–10
(Germany) HRT Ford Racing	Ford Mustang GT3 Evo	Ford Coyote 5.4 L V8	64	(Germany) Christopher Mies	P	1
(Germany) HRT Ford Racing	Ford Mustang GT3 Evo	Ford Coyote 5.4 L V8	64	(Belgium) Frédéric Vervisch	P	1
(Germany) HRT Ford Racing	Ford Mustang GT3 Evo	Ford Coyote 5.4 L V8	64	(Norway) Dennis Olsen	P	1
(Germany) HRT Ford Racing	Ford Mustang GT3 Evo	Ford Coyote 5.4 L V8	64	(Switzerland) Fabio Scherer	P	2
(Germany) HRT Ford Racing	Ford Mustang GT3 Evo	Ford Coyote 5.4 L V8	64	(Norway) Emil Christian Gjerdrum	P	2
(Germany) HRT Ford Racing	Ford Mustang GT3 Evo	Ford Coyote 5.4 L V8	64	(India) Arjun Maini	P	2
(Germany) HRT Ford Racing	Ford Mustang GT3 Evo	Ford Coyote 5.4 L V8	64	(Germany) Frank Stippler	P	7–10
(Germany) HRT Ford Racing	Ford Mustang GT3 Evo	Ford Coyote 5.4 L V8	65	(Germany) Vincent Kolb	P	3
(Germany) HRT Ford Racing	Ford Mustang GT3 Evo	Ford Coyote 5.4 L V8	65	(Germany) Christopher Mies	P	3
(Germany) HRT Ford Racing	Ford Mustang GT3 Evo	Ford Coyote 5.4 L V8	65	(Norway) Dennis Olsen	P	3
(Germany) HRT Ford Racing	Ford Mustang GT3 Evo	Ford Coyote 5.4 L V8	65	(Belgium) Frédéric Vervisch	P	3
(Germany) HRT Ford Racing	Ford Mustang GT3 Evo	Ford Coyote 5.4 L V8	65	(Germany) Frank Stippler	P	4–5
(Germany) HRT Ford Racing	Ford Mustang GT3 Evo	Ford Coyote 5.4 L V8	65	(Germany) Hubert Haupt	P	4–5
(Germany) HRT Ford Racing	Ford Mustang GT3 Evo	Ford Coyote 5.4 L V8	65	(India) Arjun Maini	P	4–5
(Germany) HRT Ford Racing	Ford Mustang GT3 Evo	Ford Coyote 5.4 L V8	65	(Germany) David Schumacher	P	4–5
(Germany) HRT Ford Racing	Ford Mustang GT3 Evo	Ford Coyote 5.4 L V8	65	(Germany) Hubert Haupt	PA	2
(Germany) HRT Ford Racing	Ford Mustang GT3 Evo	Ford Coyote 5.4 L V8	65	(Germany) David Schumacher	PA	2
(Germany) HRT Ford Racing	Ford Mustang GT3 Evo	Ford Coyote 5.4 L V8	65	(Germany) Frank Stippler	PA	2
(Germany) HRT Ford Racing	Ford Mustang GT3 Evo	Ford Coyote 5.4 L V8	67	(Germany) Christopher Mies	P	4–5
(Germany) HRT Ford Racing	Ford Mustang GT3 Evo	Ford Coyote 5.4 L V8	67	(Belgium) Frédéric Vervisch	P	4–5
(Germany) HRT Ford Racing	Ford Mustang GT3 Evo	Ford Coyote 5.4 L V8	67	(Switzerland) Fabio Scherer	P	4–5
(Germany) HRT Ford Racing	Ford Mustang GT3 Evo	Ford Coyote 5.4 L V8	67	(Netherlands) Colin Caresani	P	4–5
(Germany) Schubert Motorsport	BMW M4 GT3 Evo	BMW P58 3.0 L Turbo I6	77	(Netherlands) Robin Frijns	P	1, 3, 6
(Germany) Schubert Motorsport	BMW M4 GT3 Evo	BMW P58 3.0 L Turbo I6	77	(Austria) Philipp Eng	P	1, 3
(Germany) Schubert Motorsport	BMW M4 GT3 Evo	BMW P58 3.0 L Turbo I6	77	(Germany) Marco Wittmann	P	1, 3
(Germany) Schubert Motorsport	BMW M4 GT3 Evo	BMW P58 3.0 L Turbo I6	77	(Belgium) Ugo de Wilde	P	2, 4–5, 7–9
(Germany) Schubert Motorsport	BMW M4 GT3 Evo	BMW P58 3.0 L Turbo I6	77	(Belgium) Charles Weerts	P	2, 4–5
(Germany) Schubert Motorsport	BMW M4 GT3 Evo	BMW P58 3.0 L Turbo I6	77	(Germany) Jens Klingmann	P	2, 6–9
(Germany) Schubert Motorsport	BMW M4 GT3 Evo	BMW P58 3.0 L Turbo I6	77	(Germany) Tim Tramnitz	P	7, 10
(Germany) Schubert Motorsport	BMW M4 GT3 Evo	BMW P58 3.0 L Turbo I6	77	(South Africa) Jordan Pepper	P	8–10
(Denmark) High Class Racing	Porsche 911 GT3 R (992.2)	Porsche M97/80 4.2 L Flat-6	86	(Denmark) Anders Fjordbach	PA	4–5
(Denmark) High Class Racing	Porsche 911 GT3 R (992.2)	Porsche M97/80 4.2 L Flat-6	86	(China) Li Kerong	PA	4–5
(Denmark) High Class Racing	Porsche 911 GT3 R (992.2)	Porsche M97/80 4.2 L Flat-6	86	(China) Ye Hongli	PA	4–5
(Germany) Up2Race	Porsche 911 GT3 R (992.2)	Porsche M97/80 4.2 L Flat-6	88	(Ukraine) Oleksiy Kikireshko	PA	7
(Germany) Up2Race	Porsche 911 GT3 R (992.2)	Porsche M97/80 4.2 L Flat-6	88	(Germany) Tim Heinemann	PA	7
(Germany) Rowe Racing	BMW M4 GT3 Evo	BMW P58 3.0 L Turbo I6	98	(Brazil) Augusto Farfus	P	1–2
(Germany) Rowe Racing	BMW M4 GT3 Evo	BMW P58 3.0 L Turbo I6	98	(Switzerland) Raffaele Marciello	P	1–2
(Germany) Rowe Racing	BMW M4 GT3 Evo	BMW P58 3.0 L Turbo I6	98	(South Africa) Jordan Pepper	P	1
(Germany) Rowe Racing	BMW M4 GT3 Evo	BMW P58 3.0 L Turbo I6	98	(South Africa) Kelvin van der Linde	P	2
(Germany) Rowe Racing	BMW M4 GT3 Evo	BMW P58 3.0 L Turbo I6	99	(United Kingdom) Dan Harper	P	1–2
(Germany) Rowe Racing	BMW M4 GT3 Evo	BMW P58 3.0 L Turbo I6	99	(Germany) Max Hesse	P	1, 4–5
(Germany) Rowe Racing	BMW M4 GT3 Evo	BMW P58 3.0 L Turbo I6	99	(South Africa) Sheldon van der Linde	P	1
(Germany) Rowe Racing	BMW M4 GT3 Evo	BMW P58 3.0 L Turbo I6	99	(South Africa) Jordan Pepper	P	2, 4–5
(Germany) Rowe Racing	BMW M4 GT3 Evo	BMW P58 3.0 L Turbo I6	99	(South Africa) Kelvin van der Linde	P	4–5
(Belgium) Mühlner Motorsport	Porsche 911 GT3 R (992.2)	Porsche M97/80 4.2 L Flat-6	123	(Germany) Ben Bünnagel	PA	4–5, 7–9
(Belgium) Mühlner Motorsport	Porsche 911 GT3 R (992.2)	Porsche M97/80 4.2 L Flat-6	123	(Estonia) Martin Rump	PA	4–5, 7–9
(Belgium) Mühlner Motorsport	Porsche 911 GT3 R (992.2)	Porsche M97/80 4.2 L Flat-6	123	(Germany) Noah Nagelsdiek	PA	7–9
(Germany) Team ABT Sportsline	Lamborghini Huracán GT3 Evo 2	Lamborghini DGF 5.2 L V10	130; 84	(Italy) Marco Mapelli	P	1–2
(Germany) Team ABT Sportsline	Lamborghini Huracán GT3 Evo 2	Lamborghini DGF 5.2 L V10	130; 84	(Netherlands) Nicky Catsburg	P	1
(Germany) Team ABT Sportsline	Lamborghini Huracán GT3 Evo 2	Lamborghini DGF 5.2 L V10	130; 84	(United Kingdom) Nick Yelloly	P	1
(Germany) Team ABT Sportsline	Lamborghini Huracán GT3 Evo 2	Lamborghini DGF 5.2 L V10	130; 84	(Italy) Mirko Bortolotti	P	2, 4–5
(Germany) Team ABT Sportsline	Lamborghini Huracán GT3 Evo 2	Lamborghini DGF 5.2 L V10	130; 84	(Germany) Luca Engstler	P	2, 4–5
(Germany) Team ABT Sportsline	Lamborghini Huracán GT3 Evo 2	Lamborghini DGF 5.2 L V10	130; 84	(Switzerland) Patric Niederhauser	P	2, 4–5
(Thailand) Renazzo Motorsport	Lamborghini Huracán GT3 Evo 2	Lamborghini DGF 5.2 L V10	786	(Thailand) Kiki Sak Nana	Am	1–3, 6–8, 10
(Thailand) Renazzo Motorsport	Lamborghini Huracán GT3 Evo 2	Lamborghini DGF 5.2 L V10	786	(Germany) Christoph Breuer	Am	1–3, 6–7, 10
(Thailand) Renazzo Motorsport	Lamborghini Huracán GT3 Evo 2	Lamborghini DGF 5.2 L V10	786	(Germany) Dieter Schmidtmann	Am	1–3, 6, 8, 10
(Thailand) Renazzo Motorsport	Lamborghini Huracán GT3 Evo 2	Lamborghini DGF 5.2 L V10	786	(Germany) Thomas Mutsch	Am	3, 7
(Thailand) Renazzo Motorsport	Lamborghini Huracán GT3 Evo 2	Lamborghini DGF 5.2 L V10	786	(Germany) Thomas Kiefer	Am	8
(Germany) Manthey Racing EMA	Porsche 911 GT3 R (992.2)	Porsche M97/80 4.2 L Flat-6	911	(Turkey) Ayhancan Güven	P	1, 3
(Germany) Manthey Racing EMA	Porsche 911 GT3 R (992.2)	Porsche M97/80 4.2 L Flat-6	911	(France) Kévin Estre	P	1
(Germany) Manthey Racing EMA	Porsche 911 GT3 R (992.2)	Porsche M97/80 4.2 L Flat-6	911	(Australia) Matt Campbell	P	3–5
(Germany) Manthey Racing EMA	Porsche 911 GT3 R (992.2)	Porsche M97/80 4.2 L Flat-6	911	(Germany) Christoph Breuer	P	4–5
(Germany) Manthey Racing EMA	Porsche 911 GT3 R (992.2)	Porsche M97/80 4.2 L Flat-6	911	(Austria) Thomas Preining	P	4–5
Entry Lists:

Icon	Class
P	Pro Cup
PA	Pro-Am Cup
Am	Am Cup

==== SP10 (Group GT4) ====
Team	Car	Engine	No.	Drivers	Class	Rounds
(Germany) FK Performance Motorsport	BMW M4 GT4 Evo (G82)	BMW S58B30T0 3.0 L Turbo I6	1	(Bulgaria) Pavel Lefterov	PA	9
(Germany) FK Performance Motorsport	BMW M4 GT4 Evo (G82)	BMW S58B30T0 3.0 L Turbo I6	1	(Bulgaria) Alex Stefanov	PA	9
(Germany) FK Performance Motorsport	BMW M4 GT4 Evo (G82)	BMW S58B30T0 3.0 L Turbo I6	1	(Bulgaria) Dimitar Balev	PA	9
(Germany) Cerny Motorsport	BMW M4 GT4 Evo (G82)	BMW S58B30T0 3.0 L Turbo I6	145	(Belgium) Aris Balanian	PA	4–5
(Germany) Cerny Motorsport	BMW M4 GT4 Evo (G82)	BMW S58B30T0 3.0 L Turbo I6	145	(France) Joshua Bednarski	PA	4–5
(Germany) Cerny Motorsport	BMW M4 GT4 Evo (G82)	BMW S58B30T0 3.0 L Turbo I6	145	(United Kingdom) Peter Cate	PA	4–5
(Germany) Cerny Motorsport	BMW M4 GT4 Evo (G82)	BMW S58B30T0 3.0 L Turbo I6	145	(Germany) Tom Schütze	PA	4–5
(Germany) Plusline Motorsport	BMW M4 GT4 Evo (G82)	BMW S58B30T0 3.0 L Turbo I6	155	(Germany) Maik Rönnefarth	Am	1–6, 8–10
(Germany) Plusline Motorsport	BMW M4 GT4 Evo (G82)	BMW S58B30T0 3.0 L Turbo I6	155	(Germany) Richard Gresek	Am	1, 3–10
(Germany) Plusline Motorsport	BMW M4 GT4 Evo (G82)	BMW S58B30T0 3.0 L Turbo I6	155	(Germany) Philipp Gresek	Am	1, 8–10
(Germany) Plusline Motorsport	BMW M4 GT4 Evo (G82)	BMW S58B30T0 3.0 L Turbo I6	155	(Germany) Christian Konnerth	Am	2, 7
(Germany) Plusline Motorsport	BMW M4 GT4 Evo (G82)	BMW S58B30T0 3.0 L Turbo I6	155	(Germany) Tobias Wahl	Am	2
(Germany) W&S Motorsport	Porsche 718 Cayman GT4 RS Clubsport	Porsche MDG.GA 4.0 L Flat-6	164	(Germany) Stephan Brodmerkel	PA	10
(Germany) W&S Motorsport	Porsche 718 Cayman GT4 RS Clubsport	Porsche MDG.GA 4.0 L Flat-6	164	(Germany) Constantin Schöll	PA	10
(Germany) W&S Motorsport	Porsche 718 Cayman GT4 RS Clubsport	Porsche MDG.GA 4.0 L Flat-6	164	(Germany) Stephan Brodmerkel	Am	1–3, 6–9
(Germany) W&S Motorsport	Porsche 718 Cayman GT4 RS Clubsport	Porsche MDG.GA 4.0 L Flat-6	164	(Germany) Hendrik Still	Am	1–2, 6–7
(Germany) W&S Motorsport	Porsche 718 Cayman GT4 RS Clubsport	Porsche MDG.GA 4.0 L Flat-6	164	(Germany) Jürgen Vöhringer	Am	1–2, 6–7
(Germany) W&S Motorsport	Porsche 718 Cayman GT4 RS Clubsport	Porsche MDG.GA 4.0 L Flat-6	164	(Austria) Constantin Schöll	Am	3, 6–9
(Germany) W&S Motorsport	Porsche 718 Cayman GT4 RS Clubsport	Porsche MDG.GA 4.0 L Flat-6	164	(Germany) Yanis Anhorn	Am	3
(Germany) W&S Motorsport	Porsche 718 Cayman GT4 RS Clubsport	Porsche MDG.GA 4.0 L Flat-6	164	(Austria) Tobias Poschik	Am	8–9
(Germany) SR Motorsport by Schnitzelalm	Mercedes-AMG GT4	Mercedes-Benz M178 4.0 L Turbo V8	165	(Germany) Jay Mo Härtling	PA	9
(Germany) SR Motorsport by Schnitzelalm	Mercedes-AMG GT4	Mercedes-Benz M178 4.0 L Turbo V8	165	(Germany) Enrico Förderer	PA	9
(Germany) SR Motorsport by Schnitzelalm	Mercedes-AMG GT4	Mercedes-Benz M178 4.0 L Turbo V8	165	(Germany) Tim Neuser	PA	9
(Romania) Willi Motorsport	BMW M4 GT4 Evo (G82)	BMW S58B30T0 3.0 L Turbo I6	166	(Romania) Sergiu Nicolae	PA	10
(Romania) Willi Motorsport	BMW M4 GT4 Evo (G82)	BMW S58B30T0 3.0 L Turbo I6	166	(Romania) Tudor Tudurachi	PA	10
(Germany) Toyo Tires with Ring Racing	Toyota GR Supra GT4 Evo	BMW B58B30 3.0 L Turbo I6	170	(Japan) Kazuto Kotaka	P	2, 4–6
(Germany) Toyo Tires with Ring Racing	Toyota GR Supra GT4 Evo	BMW B58B30 3.0 L Turbo I6	170	(Japan) Miki Koyama	P	2, 4–6
(Germany) Toyo Tires with Ring Racing	Toyota GR Supra GT4 Evo	BMW B58B30 3.0 L Turbo I6	170	(Japan) Shunji Okumoto	P	4–5
(Germany) Toyo Tires with Ring Racing	Toyota GR Supra GT4 Evo	BMW B58B30 3.0 L Turbo I6	170	(France) Giuliano Alesi	P	4–5
(Germany) Toyo Tires with Ring Racing	Toyota GR Supra GT4 Evo	BMW B58B30 3.0 L Turbo I6	170	(Japan) Miki Koyama	PA	8–10
(Germany) Toyo Tires with Ring Racing	Toyota GR Supra GT4 Evo	BMW B58B30 3.0 L Turbo I6	170	(Japan) Shunji Okumoto	PA	8–10
(Germany) Toyo Tires with Ring Racing	Toyota GR Supra GT4 Evo	BMW B58B30 3.0 L Turbo I6	170	(Japan) Kazuto Kotaka	PA	10
(Germany) Toyo Tires with Ring Racing	Toyota GR Supra GT4 Evo	BMW B58B30 3.0 L Turbo I6	170	(Japan) Yuichi Nakayama	Am	1
(Germany) Toyo Tires with Ring Racing	Toyota GR Supra GT4 Evo	BMW B58B30 3.0 L Turbo I6	170	(Japan) Shunji Okumoto	Am	1
(Switzerland) BSL Racing Team	Porsche 718 Cayman GT4 RS Clubsport	Porsche MDG.GA 4.0 L Flat-6	171	(Germany) Philipp Hagnauer	Am	2, 4–5
(Switzerland) BSL Racing Team	Porsche 718 Cayman GT4 RS Clubsport	Porsche MDG.GA 4.0 L Flat-6	171	(Germany) Alexander Walker	Am	2, 4–5
(Switzerland) BSL Racing Team	Porsche 718 Cayman GT4 RS Clubsport	Porsche MDG.GA 4.0 L Flat-6	171	(Sweden) Eric Ullström	Am	4–5
(Germany) PROsport-Racing	Mercedes-AMG GT4	Mercedes-Benz M178 4.0 L Turbo V8	174	(Belgium) Jacques Derenne	P	3
(Germany) PROsport-Racing	Mercedes-AMG GT4	Mercedes-Benz M178 4.0 L Turbo V8	174	(United Kingdom) Kyle Tilley	P	3
(Germany) PROsport-Racing	Mercedes-AMG GT4	Mercedes-Benz M178 4.0 L Turbo V8	174	(Netherlands) Ricardo van der Ende	PA	10
(Germany) PROsport-Racing	Mercedes-AMG GT4	Mercedes-Benz M178 4.0 L Turbo V8	174	(Germany) Nico Hantke	PA	10
(Germany) PROsport-Racing	Mercedes-AMG GT4	Mercedes-Benz M178 4.0 L Turbo V8	174	(Germany) Hugo Sasse	PA	10
(Germany) PROsport-Racing	Mercedes-AMG GT4	Mercedes-Benz M178 4.0 L Turbo V8	175	(Sweden) Gustav Bard	Am	4–5
(Germany) PROsport-Racing	Mercedes-AMG GT4	Mercedes-Benz M178 4.0 L Turbo V8	175	(Germany) Carsten Kautz	Am	4–5
(Germany) PROsport-Racing	Mercedes-AMG GT4	Mercedes-Benz M178 4.0 L Turbo V8	175	(United Kingdom) Chris Lulham	Am	4–5
(Germany) PROsport-Racing	Mercedes-AMG GT4	Mercedes-Benz M178 4.0 L Turbo V8	175	(Portugal) Guilherme Oliveira	Am	4–5
(Germany) PROsport-Racing	Mercedes-AMG GT4	Mercedes-Benz M178 4.0 L Turbo V8	175	(Belgium) Jacques Derenne	Am	8–9
(Germany) PROsport-Racing	Mercedes-AMG GT4	Mercedes-Benz M178 4.0 L Turbo V8	175	(United States) Robb Holland	Am	8
(Germany) PROsport-Racing	Mercedes-AMG GT4	Mercedes-Benz M178 4.0 L Turbo V8	175	(Belgium) Jean-Luc Behets	Am	9
(Germany) PROsport-Racing	Mercedes-AMG GT4	Mercedes-Benz M178 4.0 L Turbo V8	176	(Germany) Anton Abee	PA	1–8, 10
(Germany) PROsport-Racing	Mercedes-AMG GT4	Mercedes-Benz M178 4.0 L Turbo V8	176	(Germany) Yannik Himmels	PA	1–8, 10
(Germany) PROsport-Racing	Mercedes-AMG GT4	Mercedes-Benz M178 4.0 L Turbo V8	176	(Germany) Jörg Viebahn	PA	1–8
(Germany) PROsport-Racing	Mercedes-AMG GT4	Mercedes-Benz M178 4.0 L Turbo V8	176	(Germany) Marek Böckmann	PA	10
(Germany) PROsport-Racing	Aston Martin Vantage AMR GT4 Evo	Mercedes-Benz M177 4.0 L Turbo V8	175	(Sweden) Gustav Bard	P	3
(Germany) PROsport-Racing	Aston Martin Vantage AMR GT4 Evo	Mercedes-Benz M177 4.0 L Turbo V8	175	(Sweden) Patrick Skoog	P	3
(Germany) PROsport-Racing	Porsche 718 Cayman GT4 RS Clubsport	Porsche MDG.GA 4.0 L Flat-6	181	(Germany) Anton Abée	PA	9
(Germany) PROsport-Racing	Porsche 718 Cayman GT4 RS Clubsport	Porsche MDG.GA 4.0 L Flat-6	181	(Germany) Yannik Himmels	PA	9
(Germany) PROsport-Racing	Porsche 718 Cayman GT4 RS Clubsport	Porsche MDG.GA 4.0 L Flat-6	181	(Germany) Jörg Viebahn	PA	9
(Germany) AV Racing by Black Falcon	BMW M4 GT4 Evo (G82)	BMW S58B30T0 3.0 L Turbo I6	177	(Romania) Alexandru Vasilescu	Am	All
(Germany) AV Racing by Black Falcon	BMW M4 GT4 Evo (G82)	BMW S58B30T0 3.0 L Turbo I6	177	(United States) Malcolm Harrison	Am	1, 3, 6–7
(Germany) AV Racing by Black Falcon	BMW M4 GT4 Evo (G82)	BMW S58B30T0 3.0 L Turbo I6	177	(United States) David Ogburn	Am	1, 3, 7
(Germany) AV Racing by Black Falcon	BMW M4 GT4 Evo (G82)	BMW S58B30T0 3.0 L Turbo I6	177	(Romania) Sergiu Nicolae	Am	2
(Germany) AV Racing by Black Falcon	BMW M4 GT4 Evo (G82)	BMW S58B30T0 3.0 L Turbo I6	177	(United States) Charles Russell Turner	Am	4–5, 7–9
(Germany) AV Racing by Black Falcon	BMW M4 GT4 Evo (G82)	BMW S58B30T0 3.0 L Turbo I6	177	(United States) Mark Smith	Am	4–5, 10
(Germany) AV Racing by Black Falcon	BMW M4 GT4 Evo (G82)	BMW S58B30T0 3.0 L Turbo I6	177	(United States) Charles Espenlaub	Am	6
(Germany) AV Racing by Black Falcon	BMW M4 GT4 Evo (G82)	BMW S58B30T0 3.0 L Turbo I6	177	(Germany) Manuel Metzger	Am	8–9
(Germany) AV Racing by Black Falcon	BMW M4 GT4 Evo (G82)	BMW S58B30T0 3.0 L Turbo I6	177	(United States) Mike Skeen	Am	10
(Germany) AV Racing by Black Falcon	BMW M4 GT4 Evo (G82)	BMW S58B30T0 3.0 L Turbo I6	180	(United States) Judson Holt	Am	1–5, 8–9
(Germany) AV Racing by Black Falcon	BMW M4 GT4 Evo (G82)	BMW S58B30T0 3.0 L Turbo I6	180	(United States) Denny Stripling	Am	1–5, 8–9
(Germany) AV Racing by Black Falcon	BMW M4 GT4 Evo (G82)	BMW S58B30T0 3.0 L Turbo I6	180	(United States) Charles Russell Turner	Am	1, 3
(Germany) AV Racing by Black Falcon	BMW M4 GT4 Evo (G82)	BMW S58B30T0 3.0 L Turbo I6	180	(United States) David Ogburn	Am	2, 4–5, 8–9
(Germany) AV Racing by Black Falcon	BMW M4 GT4 Evo (G82)	BMW S58B30T0 3.0 L Turbo I6	180	(South Korea) Lee Chang-uk	Am	10
(Germany) AV Racing by Black Falcon	BMW M4 GT4 Evo (G82)	BMW S58B30T0 3.0 L Turbo I6	180	(South Korea) Lee Jung-woo	Am	10
(Japan) Toyota Racing United	Toyota GR Supra GT4 Evo "B-Spec"	BMW B58B30 3.0 L Turbo I6	178; 90	(France) Hadrien David	P	3
(Japan) Toyota Racing United	Toyota GR Supra GT4 Evo "B-Spec"	BMW B58B30 3.0 L Turbo I6	178; 90	(France) Edgar Pierre	P	3
(Japan) Toyota Racing United	Toyota GR Supra GT4 Evo "B-Spec"	BMW B58B30 3.0 L Turbo I6	178; 90	(Belgium) Lucas Cartelle	PA	4–5
(Japan) Toyota Racing United	Toyota GR Supra GT4 Evo "B-Spec"	BMW B58B30 3.0 L Turbo I6	178; 90	(Spain) Javier Sagrera	PA	4–5
(Japan) Toyota Racing United	Toyota GR Supra GT4 Evo "B-Spec"	BMW B58B30 3.0 L Turbo I6	178; 90	(Germany) Hugo Schwarze	PA	4–5
(Germany) Jung Motorsport	Mercedes-AMG GT4	Mercedes-Benz M178 4.0 L Turbo V8	179	(Germany) Eugen Weber	G	10
(Germany) Jung Motorsport	Mercedes-AMG GT4	Mercedes-Benz M178 4.0 L Turbo V8	179	(Germany) Mario Fuchs	G	10
(Germany) Jung Motorsport	Mercedes-AMG GT4	Mercedes-Benz M178 4.0 L Turbo V8	179	(Germany) Tobias Jung	G	10
(Germany) SRS Team Sorg Rennsport	Porsche 718 Cayman GT4 RS Clubsport	Porsche MDG.GA 4.0 L Flat-6	181	(Denmark) Anders Fjordbach	PA	1–2
(Germany) SRS Team Sorg Rennsport	Porsche 718 Cayman GT4 RS Clubsport	Porsche MDG.GA 4.0 L Flat-6	181	(China) Li Kerong	PA	1–2
(Germany) SRS Team Sorg Rennsport	Porsche 718 Cayman GT4 RS Clubsport	Porsche MDG.GA 4.0 L Flat-6	181	(China) Ye Hongli	PA	1–2
(Germany) Manthey Racing	Porsche 718 Cayman GT4 RS Clubsport	Porsche MDG.GA 4.0 L Flat-6	181	(Canada) Orey Fidani	Am	8
(Germany) Manthey Racing	Porsche 718 Cayman GT4 RS Clubsport	Porsche MDG.GA 4.0 L Flat-6	181	(Germany) Lars Kern	Am	8
	Audi R8 LMS GT4 Evo	Audi DAR 5.2 L V10	188	(Germany) Markus Bückle	P	3
	Audi R8 LMS GT4 Evo	Audi DAR 5.2 L V10	188	(Germany) Danny Brink	P	3
	Audi R8 LMS GT4 Evo	Audi DAR 5.2 L V10	188	(Germany) Moritz Thomas Rosenbach	P	3
(Switzerland) Hofor Racing by Bonk Motorsport	BMW M4 GT4 (G82)	BMW S58B30T0 3.0 L TurboI6	189	(Germany) Michael Bonk	P	6
(Switzerland) Hofor Racing by Bonk Motorsport	BMW M4 GT4 (G82)	BMW S58B30T0 3.0 L TurboI6	189	(Switzerland) Martin Kroll	P	6
(Switzerland) Hofor Racing by Bonk Motorsport	BMW M4 GT4 (G82)	BMW S58B30T0 3.0 L TurboI6	189	(Germany) Jens Moetefindt	P	6
(Switzerland) Hofor Racing by Bonk Motorsport	BMW M4 GT4 (G82)	BMW S58B30T0 3.0 L TurboI6	189	(Switzerland) Martin Kroll	Am	1–5, 7–10
(Switzerland) Hofor Racing by Bonk Motorsport	BMW M4 GT4 (G82)	BMW S58B30T0 3.0 L TurboI6	189	(Germany) Michael Bonk	Am	1, 3–5, 7–10
(Switzerland) Hofor Racing by Bonk Motorsport	BMW M4 GT4 (G82)	BMW S58B30T0 3.0 L TurboI6	189	(Germany) Thorsten Wolter	Am	2, 4–5
(Switzerland) Hofor Racing by Bonk Motorsport	BMW M4 GT4 (G82)	BMW S58B30T0 3.0 L TurboI6	189	(Germany) Jens Moetefindt	Am	7
(Switzerland) Hofor Racing by Bonk Motorsport	BMW M4 GT4 (G82)	BMW S58B30T0 3.0 L TurboI6	190; 188	(Germany) Maximilian Partl	PA	4–5, 7
(Switzerland) Hofor Racing by Bonk Motorsport	BMW M4 GT4 (G82)	BMW S58B30T0 3.0 L TurboI6	190; 188	(Germany) Philip Wiskirchen	PA	4–5, 7
(Switzerland) Hofor Racing by Bonk Motorsport	BMW M4 GT4 (G82)	BMW S58B30T0 3.0 L TurboI6	190; 188	(Germany) Michael Schrey	PA	4–5
(Switzerland) Hofor Racing by Bonk Motorsport	BMW M4 GT4 (G82)	BMW S58B30T0 3.0 L TurboI6	190; 188	(Germany) Felix Partl	PA	7
(Germany) Car Collection Motorsport	Porsche 718 Cayman GT4 RS Clubsport	Porsche MDG.GA 4.0 L Flat-6	191	(Germany) Montego Maassen	PA	7
(Germany) Car Collection Motorsport	Porsche 718 Cayman GT4 RS Clubsport	Porsche MDG.GA 4.0 L Flat-6	191	(Dominican Republic) Joel Monegro	PA	7
(Germany) Car Collection Motorsport	Porsche 718 Cayman GT4 RS Clubsport	Porsche MDG.GA 4.0 L Flat-6	191	(Switzerland) Alexander Fach	PA	7
(Singapore) Giti Tire Motorsport by WS Racing	Porsche 718 Cayman GT4 RS Clubsport	Porsche MDG.GA 4.0 L Flat-6	646	(Germany) Michelle Halder	P	7
(Singapore) Giti Tire Motorsport by WS Racing	Porsche 718 Cayman GT4 RS Clubsport	Porsche MDG.GA 4.0 L Flat-6	646	(United Kingdom) Chloe Chong	P	7
(Singapore) Giti Tire Motorsport by WS Racing	Porsche 718 Cayman GT4 RS Clubsport	Porsche MDG.GA 4.0 L Flat-6	646	(Liechtenstein) Fabienne Wohlwend	P	7
(Germany) Team75 Bernhard	Porsche 718 Cayman GT4 RS Clubsport	Porsche MDG.GA 4.0 L Flat-6	718	(Germany) Timo Bernhard	G	7
(Germany) Team75 Bernhard	Porsche 718 Cayman GT4 RS Clubsport	Porsche MDG.GA 4.0 L Flat-6	718	(Germany) Jörg Bergmeister	G	7
Entry Lists:

Icon	Class
P	Pro Cup
PA	Pro/Am Cup
Am	Am Cup
G	Guest

==== Porsche Endurance Trophy Nürburgring ====
Team	Car	Engine	No.	Drivers	Class	Rounds
CUP2
(Germany) Sante Royale Racing Team	Porsche 992 GT3 Cup (992.1)	Porsche 4.0 L Flat-6	95	(Germany) David Kiefer	P	4–5
(Germany) Sante Royale Racing Team	Porsche 992 GT3 Cup (992.1)	Porsche 4.0 L Flat-6	95	(Germany) Marius Kiefer	P	4–5
(Germany) Sante Royale Racing Team	Porsche 992 GT3 Cup (992.1)	Porsche 4.0 L Flat-6	95	(Germany) Stefan Kiefer	P	4–5
(Germany) Sante Royale Racing Team	Porsche 992 GT3 Cup (992.1)	Porsche 4.0 L Flat-6	95	(Austria) Luca Rettenbacher	P	4–5
(Germany) Black Falcon Team Zimmermann	Porsche 992 GT3 Cup (992.1)	Porsche 4.0 L Flat-6	900	(Germany) Alexander Hardt	P	1–3, 6–10
(Germany) Black Falcon Team Zimmermann	Porsche 992 GT3 Cup (992.1)	Porsche 4.0 L Flat-6	900	(Chile) Benjamín Hites	P	1–3, 6–10
(Germany) Black Falcon Team Zimmermann	Porsche 992 GT3 Cup (992.1)	Porsche 4.0 L Flat-6	900	(Germany) Benjamin Koslowski	P	1–3, 6–10
(Germany) Team Liqui Moly by Black Falcon	Porsche 992 GT3 Cup (992.1)	Porsche 4.0 L Flat-6	902	(United States) Ryan Harrison	P	1–3, 6–10
(Germany) Team Liqui Moly by Black Falcon	Porsche 992 GT3 Cup (992.1)	Porsche 4.0 L Flat-6	902	(Austria) Raphael Rennhofer	P	1–3, 6–10
(Germany) Team Liqui Moly by Black Falcon	Porsche 992 GT3 Cup (992.1)	Porsche 4.0 L Flat-6	902	(Germany) Leon Wassertheurer	P	1–3, 6–10
(Germany) Black Falcon (Germany) AV Racing by Black Falcon	Porsche 992 GT3 Cup (992.1)	Porsche 4.0 L Flat-6	920	(Germany) Noah Nagelsdiek	P	4–5
(Germany) Black Falcon (Germany) AV Racing by Black Falcon	Porsche 992 GT3 Cup (992.1)	Porsche 4.0 L Flat-6	920	(Austria) Raphael Rennhofer	P	4–5
(Germany) Black Falcon (Germany) AV Racing by Black Falcon	Porsche 992 GT3 Cup (992.1)	Porsche 4.0 L Flat-6	920	(United States) Peter Ludwig	G	7
(Germany) Black Falcon (Germany) AV Racing by Black Falcon	Porsche 992 GT3 Cup (992.1)	Porsche 4.0 L Flat-6	920	(Germany) Manuel Metzger	G	7
(Germany) Black Falcon (Germany) AV Racing by Black Falcon	Porsche 992 GT3 Cup (992.1)	Porsche 4.0 L Flat-6	920	(Switzerland) "Sun Tzu"	G	7
(Germany) SRS Team Sorg Rennsport	Porsche 992 GT3 Cup (992.1)	Porsche 4.0 L Flat-6	901	(Germany) Fabio Grosse	P	1–3, 6–10
(Germany) SRS Team Sorg Rennsport	Porsche 992 GT3 Cup (992.1)	Porsche 4.0 L Flat-6	901	(Switzerland) Patrik Grütter	P	1–3, 6–10
(Germany) SRS Team Sorg Rennsport	Porsche 992 GT3 Cup (992.1)	Porsche 4.0 L Flat-6	915	(Germany) Stefan Beyer	PA	6–10
(Germany) SRS Team Sorg Rennsport	Porsche 992 GT3 Cup (992.1)	Porsche 4.0 L Flat-6	915	(Germany) Max Schlichenmeier	PA	6–10
(Germany) SRS Team Sorg Rennsport	Porsche 992 GT3 Cup (992.1)	Porsche 4.0 L Flat-6	915	(Austria) Bernhard Wagner	PA	6–10
(Germany) SRS Team Sorg Rennsport	Porsche 992 GT3 Cup (992.1)	Porsche 4.0 L Flat-6	915	(Germany) Maximilian Hill	PA	7
(Germany) SRS Team Sorg Rennsport	Porsche 992 GT3 Cup (992.1)	Porsche 4.0 L Flat-6	915	(Germany) Stefan Beyer	Am	2–3
(Germany) SRS Team Sorg Rennsport	Porsche 992 GT3 Cup (992.1)	Porsche 4.0 L Flat-6	915	(Austria) Bernhard Wagner	Am	2–3
(Germany) SRS Team Sorg Rennsport	Porsche 992 GT3 Cup (992.1)	Porsche 4.0 L Flat-6	915	(Germany) Max Schlichenmeier	Am	3
(Belgium) Mühlner Motorsport	Porsche 992 GT3 Cup (992.1)	Porsche 4.0 L Flat-6	904	(Netherlands) Flynt Schuring	P	1–2
(Belgium) Mühlner Motorsport	Porsche 992 GT3 Cup (992.1)	Porsche 4.0 L Flat-6	904	(Estonia) Martin Rump	P	1, 3, 6
(Belgium) Mühlner Motorsport	Porsche 992 GT3 Cup (992.1)	Porsche 4.0 L Flat-6	904	(Germany) Nico Bastian	P	2–3, 6–10
(Belgium) Mühlner Motorsport	Porsche 992 GT3 Cup (992.1)	Porsche 4.0 L Flat-6	904	(France) Joshua Bednarski	P	4–5, 7–9
(Belgium) Mühlner Motorsport	Porsche 992 GT3 Cup (992.1)	Porsche 4.0 L Flat-6	904	(Germany) Arne Hoffmeister	P	4–5
(Belgium) Mühlner Motorsport	Porsche 992 GT3 Cup (992.1)	Porsche 4.0 L Flat-6	904	(Hungary) Csaba Walter	P	4–5
(Belgium) Mühlner Motorsport	Porsche 992 GT3 Cup (992.1)	Porsche 4.0 L Flat-6	904	(Germany) Tim Scheerbarth	P	7–10
(Belgium) Mühlner Motorsport	Porsche 992 GT3 Cup (992.1)	Porsche 4.0 L Flat-6	904	(Ukraine) Ivan Peklin	P	7
(Belgium) Mühlner Motorsport	Porsche 992 GT3 Cup (992.1)	Porsche 4.0 L Flat-6	921	(France) Joshua Bednarski	P	1–3, 6
(Belgium) Mühlner Motorsport	Porsche 992 GT3 Cup (992.1)	Porsche 4.0 L Flat-6	921	(Germany) Tim Scheerbarth	P	1–3, 6
(Germany) pb performance	Porsche 992 GT3 Cup (992.1)	Porsche 4.0 L Flat-6	906	(Germany) Ralf-Peter Bonk	Am	2–10
(Germany) pb performance	Porsche 992 GT3 Cup (992.1)	Porsche 4.0 L Flat-6	906	(Netherlands) Marco van Ramshorst	Am	2–10
(Switzerland) Hofor Racing	Porsche 992 GT3 Cup (992.1)	Porsche 4.0 L Flat-6	908	(Switzerland) Michael Kroll	Am	1, 3, 6–10
(Switzerland) Hofor Racing	Porsche 992 GT3 Cup (992.1)	Porsche 4.0 L Flat-6	908	(Germany) Thomas Mühlenz	Am	1, 3, 6–10
(Switzerland) Hofor Racing	Porsche 992 GT3 Cup (992.1)	Porsche 4.0 L Flat-6	908	(Germany) Alexander Prinz	Am	1, 3, 6–10
(Switzerland) Hofor Racing	Porsche 992 GT3 Cup (992.1)	Porsche 4.0 L Flat-6	908	(Switzerland) Chantal Prinz	Am	1, 7
(Switzerland) Hofor Racing	Porsche 992 GT3 Cup (992.1)	Porsche 4.0 L Flat-6	908	(Germany) Torsten Kratz	Am	3, 10
(Germany) Kkrämer Racing	Porsche 992 GT3 Cup (992.1)	Porsche 4.0 L Flat-6	909	(France) Leo Messenger	PA	1–3, 6, 8, 10
(Germany) Kkrämer Racing	Porsche 992 GT3 Cup (992.1)	Porsche 4.0 L Flat-6	909	(Germany) Peter Sander	PA	1–3, 6, 8, 10
(Germany) Kkrämer Racing	Porsche 992 GT3 Cup (992.1)	Porsche 4.0 L Flat-6	909	(Germany) Karsten Krämer	PA	1–3, 6, 10
(Germany) Kkrämer Racing	Porsche 992 GT3 Cup (992.1)	Porsche 4.0 L Flat-6	909	(Switzerland) Michelangelo Comazzi	PA	6, 10
(Germany) Kkrämer Racing	Porsche 992 GT3 Cup (992.1)	Porsche 4.0 L Flat-6	909	(United States) Ace Robey	PA	8
(Germany) Kkrämer Racing	Porsche 992 GT3 Cup (992.1)	Porsche 4.0 L Flat-6	909	(Germany) Karsten Krämer	Am	4–5, 7
(Germany) Kkrämer Racing	Porsche 992 GT3 Cup (992.1)	Porsche 4.0 L Flat-6	909	(Germany) Peter Sander	Am	4–5, 7
(Germany) Kkrämer Racing	Porsche 992 GT3 Cup (992.1)	Porsche 4.0 L Flat-6	909	(France) Leo Messenger	Am	4–5
(Germany) Kkrämer Racing	Porsche 992 GT3 Cup (992.1)	Porsche 4.0 L Flat-6	909	(United States) Ace Robey	Am	4–5
(Germany) Smyrlis Racing	Porsche 992 GT3 Cup (992.1)	Porsche 4.0 L Flat-6	910	(Germany) Alex Koch	Am	1–3, 6–10
(Germany) Smyrlis Racing	Porsche 992 GT3 Cup (992.1)	Porsche 4.0 L Flat-6	910	(Germany) Niklas Koch	Am	1–3, 6–10
(Germany) Smyrlis Racing	Porsche 992 GT3 Cup (992.1)	Porsche 4.0 L Flat-6	910	(Norway) Oskar Sandberg	Am	1
(Germany) Smyrlis Racing	Porsche 992 GT3 Cup (992.1)	Porsche 4.0 L Flat-6	910	(Germany) Klaus Koch	Am	2–3, 6–10
(Germany) Smyrlis Racing	Porsche 992 GT3 Cup (992.1)	Porsche 4.0 L Flat-6	926	(United Kingdom) Leonidas Karavasili	G	3
(Germany) Smyrlis Racing	Porsche 992 GT3 Cup (992.1)	Porsche 4.0 L Flat-6	926	(Germany) Jürgen Oehler	G	3
(United Kingdom) Team Cameron	Porsche 992 GT3 Cup (992.1)	Porsche 4.0 L Flat-6	913	(United Kingdom) Bill Cameron	P	4–5
(United Kingdom) Team Cameron	Porsche 992 GT3 Cup (992.1)	Porsche 4.0 L Flat-6	913	(United Kingdom) Jim Cameron	P	4–5
(United Kingdom) Team Cameron	Porsche 992 GT3 Cup (992.1)	Porsche 4.0 L Flat-6	913	(United Kingdom) Bill Cameron	Am	1–2, 6–10
(United Kingdom) Team Cameron	Porsche 992 GT3 Cup (992.1)	Porsche 4.0 L Flat-6	913	(Germany) Ralf-Peter Bonk	Am	1–2
(United Kingdom) Team Cameron	Porsche 992 GT3 Cup (992.1)	Porsche 4.0 L Flat-6	913	(United Kingdom) Jim Cameron	Am	6–10
(Germany) Up2Race	Porsche 992 GT3 Cup (992.1)	Porsche 4.0 L Flat-6	917	(Ukraine) Oleksiy Kikireshko	P	1–2
(Germany) Up2Race	Porsche 992 GT3 Cup (992.1)	Porsche 4.0 L Flat-6	917	(Germany) Tim Heinemann	P	1
(Germany) Up2Race	Porsche 992 GT3 Cup (992.1)	Porsche 4.0 L Flat-6	917	(Germany) Fabio Grosse	P	2
(Germany) Up2Race	Porsche 992 GT3 Cup (992.1)	Porsche 4.0 L Flat-6	917	(Germany) Peter Terting	P	2
(Germany) Team Clickvers.de	Porsche 992 GT3 Cup (992.1)	Porsche 4.0 L Flat-6	919	(Germany) Robin Chrzanowski	P	4–5
(Germany) Team Clickvers.de	Porsche 992 GT3 Cup (992.1)	Porsche 4.0 L Flat-6	919	(Germany) Kersten Jodexnis	P	4–5
(Germany) Team Clickvers.de	Porsche 992 GT3 Cup (992.1)	Porsche 4.0 L Flat-6	919	(Germany) Richard-Sven Karl Jodexnis	P	4–5
(Germany) Team Clickvers.de	Porsche 992 GT3 Cup (992.1)	Porsche 4.0 L Flat-6	919	(Germany) Peter Scharmach	P	4–5
(Germany) Team Clickvers.de	Porsche 992 GT3 Cup (992.1)	Porsche 4.0 L Flat-6	919	(Germany) Robin Chrzanowski	PA	1–3, 6–10
(Germany) Team Clickvers.de	Porsche 992 GT3 Cup (992.1)	Porsche 4.0 L Flat-6	919	(Germany) Kersten Jodexnis	PA	1–3, 6–10
(Germany) Team Clickvers.de	Porsche 992 GT3 Cup (992.1)	Porsche 4.0 L Flat-6	919	(Germany) Richard-Sven Karl Jodexnis	PA	1–3, 6–10
(Germany) Team Clickvers.de	Porsche 992 GT3 Cup (992.1)	Porsche 4.0 L Flat-6	919	(Germany) Peter Scharmach	PA	7
(Germany) Huber Motorsport	Porsche 992 GT3 Cup (992.1)	Porsche 4.0 L Flat-6	925	(United States) Jaden Lander	P	4–5
(Germany) Huber Motorsport	Porsche 992 GT3 Cup (992.1)	Porsche 4.0 L Flat-6	925	(United States) Jonathan Miller	P	4–5
(Germany) Huber Motorsport	Porsche 992 GT3 Cup (992.1)	Porsche 4.0 L Flat-6	925	(Germany) Hans Wehrmann	P	4–5
(Germany) Huber Motorsport	Porsche 992 GT3 Cup (992.1)	Porsche 4.0 L Flat-6	925	(United States) Jaden Lander	G	3
(Germany) Huber Motorsport	Porsche 992 GT3 Cup (992.1)	Porsche 4.0 L Flat-6	925	(United States) Jonathan Miller	G	3
(Germany) Huber Motorsport	Porsche 992 GT3 Cup (992.1)	Porsche 4.0 L Flat-6	925	(United States) Jake Walker	G	3
(Germany) RPM Racing	Porsche 992 GT3 Cup (992.1)	Porsche 4.0 L Flat-6	935	(Sweden) Niclas Jönsson	G	1, 3, 8–9
(Germany) RPM Racing	Porsche 992 GT3 Cup (992.1)	Porsche 4.0 L Flat-6	935	(United States) Tracy Krohn	G	1, 3, 8–9
CUP3
(Germany) Black Falcon	Porsche 718 Cayman GT4 RS Clubsport	Porsche MDG.GA 4.0 L Flat-6	939	(Germany) Axel Sartingen	Am	1, 4–5
(Germany) Black Falcon	Porsche 718 Cayman GT4 RS Clubsport	Porsche MDG.GA 4.0 L Flat-6	939	(Germany) Nils Schwenk	Am	1, 4–5
(Germany) Black Falcon	Porsche 718 Cayman GT4 RS Clubsport	Porsche MDG.GA 4.0 L Flat-6	939	(Germany) Anton Ruf	Am	4–5
(Germany) Black Falcon	Porsche 718 Cayman GT4 RS Clubsport	Porsche MDG.GA 4.0 L Flat-6	939	(Germany) Axel Sartingen	G	3
(Germany) Black Falcon	Porsche 718 Cayman GT4 RS Clubsport	Porsche MDG.GA 4.0 L Flat-6	939	(Germany) Nils Schwenk	G	3
(Germany) Black Falcon	Porsche 718 Cayman GT4 RS Clubsport	Porsche MDG.GA 4.0 L Flat-6	939	(Netherlands) Simon van Roon	G	3
(Germany) Adrenalin Motorsport Team Mainhattan Wheels	Porsche 718 Cayman GT4 RS Clubsport	Porsche MDG.GA 4.0 L Flat-6	941	(Germany) Adrian Rziczny	P	4–5
(Germany) Adrenalin Motorsport Team Mainhattan Wheels	Porsche 718 Cayman GT4 RS Clubsport	Porsche MDG.GA 4.0 L Flat-6	941	(Netherlands) Mark van der Snel	P	4–5
(Germany) Adrenalin Motorsport Team Mainhattan Wheels	Porsche 718 Cayman GT4 RS Clubsport	Porsche MDG.GA 4.0 L Flat-6	941	(Netherlands) Max van der Snel	P	4–5
(Germany) Adrenalin Motorsport Team Mainhattan Wheels	Porsche 718 Cayman GT4 RS Clubsport	Porsche MDG.GA 4.0 L Flat-6	941	(Germany) Stefan Kruse	Am	1–3, 6–10
(Germany) Adrenalin Motorsport Team Mainhattan Wheels	Porsche 718 Cayman GT4 RS Clubsport	Porsche MDG.GA 4.0 L Flat-6	941	(Germany) Adrian Rziczny	Am	1–3, 6–10
(Germany) Adrenalin Motorsport Team Mainhattan Wheels	Porsche 718 Cayman GT4 RS Clubsport	Porsche MDG.GA 4.0 L Flat-6	941	(Germany) David Vogt	Am	2–3, 6–9
(Germany) 9und11 Racing	Porsche 718 Cayman GT4 RS Clubsport	Porsche MDG.GA 4.0 L Flat-6	944	(Germany) Leonard Oehme	P	1–3, 6–10
(Germany) 9und11 Racing	Porsche 718 Cayman GT4 RS Clubsport	Porsche MDG.GA 4.0 L Flat-6	944	(Germany) Moritz Oehme	P	1–3, 6–10
(Thailand) Renazzo Motorsport	Porsche 718 Cayman GT4 RS Clubsport	Porsche MDG.GA 4.0 L Flat-6	945	(Germany) Markus Nölken	PA	10
(Thailand) Renazzo Motorsport	Porsche 718 Cayman GT4 RS Clubsport	Porsche MDG.GA 4.0 L Flat-6	945	(France) Célia Martin	PA	10
(Thailand) Renazzo Motorsport	Porsche 718 Cayman GT4 RS Clubsport	Porsche MDG.GA 4.0 L Flat-6	945	(Germany) Markus Nölken	Am	1–7
(Thailand) Renazzo Motorsport	Porsche 718 Cayman GT4 RS Clubsport	Porsche MDG.GA 4.0 L Flat-6	945	(Germany) Ulrich Daniel Nölken	Am	1–2, 4–7
(Thailand) Renazzo Motorsport	Porsche 718 Cayman GT4 RS Clubsport	Porsche MDG.GA 4.0 L Flat-6	945	(Germany) Alexander Meixner	Am	3
	Porsche 718 Cayman GT4 RS Clubsport	Porsche MDG.GA 4.0 L Flat-6	946	(Germany) Marco Reinbold	G	8–9
	Porsche 718 Cayman GT4 RS Clubsport	Porsche MDG.GA 4.0 L Flat-6	946	(Germany) Tom Nittel	G	8–9
(Germany) SRS Team Sorg Rennsport	Porsche 718 Cayman GT4 RS Clubsport	Porsche MDG.GA 4.0 L Flat-6	949	(Germany) Darian Donkel	Am	1–3, 6–10
(Germany) SRS Team Sorg Rennsport	Porsche 718 Cayman GT4 RS Clubsport	Porsche MDG.GA 4.0 L Flat-6	949	(Germany) Aaron Wenisch	Am	1–3, 6–10
(Germany) SRS Team Sorg Rennsport	Porsche 718 Cayman GT4 RS Clubsport	Porsche MDG.GA 4.0 L Flat-6	949	(India) Akshay Gupta	Am	1–3
(Germany) SRS Team Sorg Rennsport	Porsche 718 Cayman GT4 RS Clubsport	Porsche MDG.GA 4.0 L Flat-6	949	(Germany) Nick Deißler	Am	6–10
(Germany) SRS Team Sorg Rennsport	Porsche 718 Cayman GT4 RS Clubsport	Porsche MDG.GA 4.0 L Flat-6	959	(Germany) Heiko Eichenberg	P	6–10
(Germany) SRS Team Sorg Rennsport	Porsche 718 Cayman GT4 RS Clubsport	Porsche MDG.GA 4.0 L Flat-6	959	(Netherlands) Calvin de Groot	P	6–10
(Germany) SRS Team Sorg Rennsport	Porsche 718 Cayman GT4 RS Clubsport	Porsche MDG.GA 4.0 L Flat-6	959	(Germany) Heiko Eichenberg	PA	1–3
(Germany) SRS Team Sorg Rennsport	Porsche 718 Cayman GT4 RS Clubsport	Porsche MDG.GA 4.0 L Flat-6	959	(Netherlands) Calvin de Groot	PA	1–3
(Germany) SRS Team Sorg Rennsport	Porsche 718 Cayman GT4 RS Clubsport	Porsche MDG.GA 4.0 L Flat-6	959	(Germany) Heiko Eichenberg	Am	4–5
(Germany) SRS Team Sorg Rennsport	Porsche 718 Cayman GT4 RS Clubsport	Porsche MDG.GA 4.0 L Flat-6	959	(Germany) Fabio Grosse	Am	4–5
(Germany) SRS Team Sorg Rennsport	Porsche 718 Cayman GT4 RS Clubsport	Porsche MDG.GA 4.0 L Flat-6	959	(Switzerland) Patrik Grütter	Am	4–5
(Germany) SRS Team Sorg Rennsport	Porsche 718 Cayman GT4 RS Clubsport	Porsche MDG.GA 4.0 L Flat-6	964	(Germany) Jörg Barth	G	7
(Germany) SRS Team Sorg Rennsport	Porsche 718 Cayman GT4 RS Clubsport	Porsche MDG.GA 4.0 L Flat-6	964	(Germany) Sören Timm	G	7
(Germany) SRS Team Sorg Rennsport	Porsche 718 Cayman GT4 RS Clubsport	Porsche MDG.GA 4.0 L Flat-6	964	(Germany) Niklas Meisenzahl	G	7
(Germany) SRS Team Sorg Rennsport	Porsche 718 Cayman GT4 RS Clubsport	Porsche MDG.GA 4.0 L Flat-6	964	(Germany) Adrian Wolf	G	7
(Germany) SRS Team Sorg Rennsport	Porsche 718 Cayman GT4 RS Clubsport	Porsche MDG.GA 4.0 L Flat-6	969	(Germany) Maximilian Eisberg	Am	1–3, 6–10
(Germany) SRS Team Sorg Rennsport	Porsche 718 Cayman GT4 RS Clubsport	Porsche MDG.GA 4.0 L Flat-6	969	(Sweden) Tommy Graberg	Am	1–3, 6–8, 10
(Germany) SRS Team Sorg Rennsport	Porsche 718 Cayman GT4 RS Clubsport	Porsche MDG.GA 4.0 L Flat-6	969	(United Kingdom) Leonidas Karavasili	Am	1
(Germany) SRS Team Sorg Rennsport	Porsche 718 Cayman GT4 RS Clubsport	Porsche MDG.GA 4.0 L Flat-6	969	(Germany) Axel Sartingen	Am	2
(Germany) SRS Team Sorg Rennsport	Porsche 718 Cayman GT4 RS Clubsport	Porsche MDG.GA 4.0 L Flat-6	969	(Germany) Sebastian Von Gartzen	Am	6–7
(Germany) SRS Team Sorg Rennsport	Porsche 718 Cayman GT4 RS Clubsport	Porsche MDG.GA 4.0 L Flat-6	969	(United States) Seth Brown	Am	8–9
(Germany) SRS Team Sorg Rennsport	Porsche 718 Cayman GT4 RS Clubsport	Porsche MDG.GA 4.0 L Flat-6	979	(United States) Joshua Jacobs	P	4–5
(Germany) SRS Team Sorg Rennsport	Porsche 718 Cayman GT4 RS Clubsport	Porsche MDG.GA 4.0 L Flat-6	979	(Germany) Christian Volz	P	4–5
(Germany) SRS Team Sorg Rennsport	Porsche 718 Cayman GT4 RS Clubsport	Porsche MDG.GA 4.0 L Flat-6	979	(Germany) Maximilian	Am	2–3, 8–9
(Germany) SRS Team Sorg Rennsport	Porsche 718 Cayman GT4 RS Clubsport	Porsche MDG.GA 4.0 L Flat-6	979	(Germany) Christoph Blümer	Am	2–3
(Germany) SRS Team Sorg Rennsport	Porsche 718 Cayman GT4 RS Clubsport	Porsche MDG.GA 4.0 L Flat-6	979	(United States) Joshua Jacobs	Am	2
(Germany) SRS Team Sorg Rennsport	Porsche 718 Cayman GT4 RS Clubsport	Porsche MDG.GA 4.0 L Flat-6	979	(Canada) Damon Surzyshyn	Am	3
(Germany) SRS Team Sorg Rennsport	Porsche 718 Cayman GT4 RS Clubsport	Porsche MDG.GA 4.0 L Flat-6	979	(Republic of Ireland) Jayden Kelly	Am	8–9
(Germany) SRS Team Sorg Rennsport	Porsche 718 Cayman GT4 RS Clubsport	Porsche MDG.GA 4.0 L Flat-6	979	(Germany) Adrian Wolf	Am	8–9
(Germany) SRS Team Sorg Rennsport	Porsche 718 Cayman GT4 RS Clubsport	Porsche MDG.GA 4.0 L Flat-6	979	(Germany) Maximilian	G	1
(Germany) SRS Team Sorg Rennsport	Porsche 718 Cayman GT4 RS Clubsport	Porsche MDG.GA 4.0 L Flat-6	979	(United States) Joshua Jacobs	G	1
(Germany) Schmickler Performance powered by Ravenol	Porsche 718 Cayman GT4 RS Clubsport	Porsche MDG.GA 4.0 L Flat-6	950	(Germany) Horst Baumann	P	2–3, 5, 7–10
(Germany) Schmickler Performance powered by Ravenol	Porsche 718 Cayman GT4 RS Clubsport	Porsche MDG.GA 4.0 L Flat-6	950	(Germany) Kai Riemer	P	2–3, 5, 7–10
(Germany) Schmickler Performance powered by Ravenol	Porsche 718 Cayman GT4 RS Clubsport	Porsche MDG.GA 4.0 L Flat-6	950	(Germany) Stefan Schmickler	P	2–3, 5, 7–10
(Germany) Schmickler Performance powered by Ravenol	Porsche 718 Cayman GT4 RS Clubsport	Porsche MDG.GA 4.0 L Flat-6	950	(Germany) Horst Baumann	PA	1
(Germany) Schmickler Performance powered by Ravenol	Porsche 718 Cayman GT4 RS Clubsport	Porsche MDG.GA 4.0 L Flat-6	950	(Germany) Markus Schmickler	PA	1
(Germany) Schmickler Performance powered by Ravenol	Porsche 718 Cayman GT4 RS Clubsport	Porsche MDG.GA 4.0 L Flat-6	950	(Germany) Stefan Schmickler	PA	1
(Germany) Schmickler Performance powered by Ravenol	Porsche 718 Cayman GT4 RS Clubsport	Porsche MDG.GA 4.0 L Flat-6	960	(Australia) Yasser Shahin	G	1, 3
(Germany) Schmickler Performance powered by Ravenol	Porsche 718 Cayman GT4 RS Clubsport	Porsche MDG.GA 4.0 L Flat-6	960	(Germany) Marco Seefried	G	1, 3
(Germany) Schmickler Performance powered by Ravenol	Porsche 718 Cayman GT4 RS Clubsport	Porsche MDG.GA 4.0 L Flat-6	960	(United States) Anthony McIntosh	G	7
(Germany) Schmickler Performance powered by Ravenol	Porsche 718 Cayman GT4 RS Clubsport	Porsche MDG.GA 4.0 L Flat-6	960	(United Kingdom) Ben Tuck	G	7
(Germany) Smyrlis Racing	Porsche 718 Cayman GT4 RS Clubsport	Porsche MDG.GA 4.0 L Flat-6	951	(Germany) Constantin Laube	Am	1–3, 6–10
(Germany) Smyrlis Racing	Porsche 718 Cayman GT4 RS Clubsport	Porsche MDG.GA 4.0 L Flat-6	951	(Germany) Henry Lindloff	Am	1–3, 6–10
(Germany) Smyrlis Racing	Porsche 718 Cayman GT4 RS Clubsport	Porsche MDG.GA 4.0 L Flat-6	951	(Germany) Paul Heinisch	Am	1
(Germany) Smyrlis Racing	Porsche 718 Cayman GT4 RS Clubsport	Porsche MDG.GA 4.0 L Flat-6	951	(Germany) Hugo Schwarze	Am	2
(Germany) Smyrlis Racing	Porsche 718 Cayman GT4 RS Clubsport	Porsche MDG.GA 4.0 L Flat-6	951	(Germany) Max Rosam	Am	3, 6–10
(Germany) Smyrlis Racing	Porsche 718 Cayman GT4 RS Clubsport	Porsche MDG.GA 4.0 L Flat-6	952	(Germany) Christian Kraus	PA	6–7, 8–10
(Germany) Smyrlis Racing	Porsche 718 Cayman GT4 RS Clubsport	Porsche MDG.GA 4.0 L Flat-6	952	(Norway) Peder Saltvedt	PA	6–7, 8–10
(Germany) Smyrlis Racing	Porsche 718 Cayman GT4 RS Clubsport	Porsche MDG.GA 4.0 L Flat-6	952	(Germany) Fidel Leib	PA	6
(Germany) Smyrlis Racing	Porsche 718 Cayman GT4 RS Clubsport	Porsche MDG.GA 4.0 L Flat-6	952	(Germany) Jan Hendrik Heimbach	PA	7
(Germany) Smyrlis Racing	Porsche 718 Cayman GT4 RS Clubsport	Porsche MDG.GA 4.0 L Flat-6	952	(Germany) Constantin Laube	PA	8
(Germany) Smyrlis Racing	Porsche 718 Cayman GT4 RS Clubsport	Porsche MDG.GA 4.0 L Flat-6	952	(Germany) Max Rosam	PA	9
(Germany) Smyrlis Racing	Porsche 718 Cayman GT4 RS Clubsport	Porsche MDG.GA 4.0 L Flat-6	952	(Japan) Obara Koji	PA	10
(Germany) Smyrlis Racing	Porsche 718 Cayman GT4 RS Clubsport	Porsche MDG.GA 4.0 L Flat-6	952	(Germany) Christian Kraus	Am	1–3
(Germany) Smyrlis Racing	Porsche 718 Cayman GT4 RS Clubsport	Porsche MDG.GA 4.0 L Flat-6	952	(Norway) Peder Saltvedt	Am	1–3
(Germany) Smyrlis Racing	Porsche 718 Cayman GT4 RS Clubsport	Porsche MDG.GA 4.0 L Flat-6	952	(Germany) Alexander Fielenbach	Am	1
(Germany) Smyrlis Racing	Porsche 718 Cayman GT4 RS Clubsport	Porsche MDG.GA 4.0 L Flat-6	952	(Norway) Eirik Wenaas-Schei	Am	3
(Germany) Smyrlis Racing	Porsche 718 Cayman GT4 RS Clubsport	Porsche MDG.GA 4.0 L Flat-6	953	(Germany) Alexander Fielenbach	P	2–10
(Germany) Smyrlis Racing	Porsche 718 Cayman GT4 RS Clubsport	Porsche MDG.GA 4.0 L Flat-6	953	(Norway) Oskar Sandberg	P	2–10
(Germany) Smyrlis Racing	Porsche 718 Cayman GT4 RS Clubsport	Porsche MDG.GA 4.0 L Flat-6	953	(Germany) Frank Anhorn	Am	1
(Germany) Smyrlis Racing	Porsche 718 Cayman GT4 RS Clubsport	Porsche MDG.GA 4.0 L Flat-6	953	(Germany) Klaus Koch	Am	1
(Germany) Smyrlis Racing	Porsche 718 Cayman GT4 RS Clubsport	Porsche MDG.GA 4.0 L Flat-6	953	(Germany) Jürgen Oehler	Am	1
	Porsche 718 Cayman GT4 RS Clubsport	Porsche MDG.GA 4.0 L Flat-6	954	(Switzerland) Armando Stanco	G	10
	Porsche 718 Cayman GT4 RS Clubsport	Porsche MDG.GA 4.0 L Flat-6	954	(Switzerland) Dario Stanco	G	10
(Germany) W&S Motorsport	Porsche 718 Cayman GT4 RS Clubsport	Porsche MDG.GA 4.0 L Flat-6	961	(United Kingdom) Toby Goodman	P	6–10
(Germany) W&S Motorsport	Porsche 718 Cayman GT4 RS Clubsport	Porsche MDG.GA 4.0 L Flat-6	961	(Czech Republic) Michal Makes	P	6–10
(Germany) W&S Motorsport	Porsche 718 Cayman GT4 RS Clubsport	Porsche MDG.GA 4.0 L Flat-6	961	(Germany) Marius Rauer	P	6–10
(Germany) W&S Motorsport	Porsche 718 Cayman GT4 RS Clubsport	Porsche MDG.GA 4.0 L Flat-6	961	(United Kingdom) Toby Goodman	PA	3
(Germany) W&S Motorsport	Porsche 718 Cayman GT4 RS Clubsport	Porsche MDG.GA 4.0 L Flat-6	961	(Czech Republic) Michal Makes	PA	3
(Germany) W&S Motorsport	Porsche 718 Cayman GT4 RS Clubsport	Porsche MDG.GA 4.0 L Flat-6	961	(Germany) Marius Rauer	PA	3
(Germany) W&S Motorsport	Porsche 718 Cayman GT4 RS Clubsport	Porsche MDG.GA 4.0 L Flat-6	961	(United Kingdom) Toby Goodman	Am	1–2
(Germany) W&S Motorsport	Porsche 718 Cayman GT4 RS Clubsport	Porsche MDG.GA 4.0 L Flat-6	961	(Czech Republic) Michal Makes	Am	1–2
(Germany) W&S Motorsport	Porsche 718 Cayman GT4 RS Clubsport	Porsche MDG.GA 4.0 L Flat-6	961	(Germany) Marius Rauer	Am	1–2
(Germany) W&S Motorsport	Porsche 718 Cayman GT4 RS Clubsport	Porsche MDG.GA 4.0 L Flat-6	962	(Germany) Moritz Oberheim	P	1–3, 6–10
(Germany) W&S Motorsport	Porsche 718 Cayman GT4 RS Clubsport	Porsche MDG.GA 4.0 L Flat-6	962	(Germany) Lorenz Stegmann	P	1–3, 6–10
(Germany) W&S Motorsport	Porsche 718 Cayman GT4 RS Clubsport	Porsche MDG.GA 4.0 L Flat-6	962	(Germany) Finn Zulauf	P	1–3
(Germany) W&S Motorsport	Porsche 718 Cayman GT4 RS Clubsport	Porsche MDG.GA 4.0 L Flat-6	982	(Germany) Lion Düker	Am	1–3, 6–10
(Germany) W&S Motorsport	Porsche 718 Cayman GT4 RS Clubsport	Porsche MDG.GA 4.0 L Flat-6	982	(Germany) Christoph Krombach	Am	1–3, 6–10
(Germany) W&S Motorsport	Porsche 718 Cayman GT4 RS Clubsport	Porsche MDG.GA 4.0 L Flat-6	982	(Germany) Oliver Kunz	Am	1–3, 6–10
(Germany) asBest Racing	Porsche 718 Cayman GT4 RS Clubsport	Porsche MDG.GA 4.0 L Flat-6	966	(Germany) Kim Berwanger	Am	1–3, 6–10
(Germany) asBest Racing	Porsche 718 Cayman GT4 RS Clubsport	Porsche MDG.GA 4.0 L Flat-6	966	(Germany) Jan-Niklas Stieler	Am	1–3, 6–10
(Germany) asBest Racing	Porsche 718 Cayman GT4 RS Clubsport	Porsche MDG.GA 4.0 L Flat-6	966	(Germany) René Höber	Am	2–3, 6–10
(United Kingdom) Breakell Racing	Porsche 718 Cayman GT4 RS Clubsport	Porsche MDG.GA 4.0 L Flat-6	967	(United Kingdom) Karim Sekkat	PA	8–9
(United Kingdom) Breakell Racing	Porsche 718 Cayman GT4 RS Clubsport	Porsche MDG.GA 4.0 L Flat-6	967	(United Kingdom) Joshua Hislop	PA	8–9
(United Kingdom) Breakell Racing	Porsche 718 Cayman GT4 RS Clubsport	Porsche MDG.GA 4.0 L Flat-6	967	(United Kingdom) Karim Sekkat	Am	3–5
(United Kingdom) Breakell Racing	Porsche 718 Cayman GT4 RS Clubsport	Porsche MDG.GA 4.0 L Flat-6	967	(United Kingdom) Pippa Mann	Am	3
(United Kingdom) Breakell Racing	Porsche 718 Cayman GT4 RS Clubsport	Porsche MDG.GA 4.0 L Flat-6	967	(Venezuela) Javier Ripoll	Am	3
(United Kingdom) Breakell Racing	Porsche 718 Cayman GT4 RS Clubsport	Porsche MDG.GA 4.0 L Flat-6	967	(United Kingdom) James Breakell	Am	4–5
(United Kingdom) Breakell Racing	Porsche 718 Cayman GT4 RS Clubsport	Porsche MDG.GA 4.0 L Flat-6	967	(United Kingdom) Joshua Hislop	Am	4–5
(Switzerland) BSL Racing Team	Porsche 718 Cayman GT4 RS Clubsport	Porsche MDG.GA 4.0 L Flat-6	970	(Germany) Dominik Schraml	G	8–9
(Switzerland) BSL Racing Team	Porsche 718 Cayman GT4 RS Clubsport	Porsche MDG.GA 4.0 L Flat-6	970	(Germany) Dirk Kraus	G	8–9
(Switzerland) BSL Racing Team	Porsche 718 Cayman GT4 RS Clubsport	Porsche MDG.GA 4.0 L Flat-6	970	(Sweden) Robin Knutsson	G	8–9
(Switzerland) BSL Racing Team	Porsche 718 Cayman GT4 RS Clubsport	Porsche MDG.GA 4.0 L Flat-6	977	(Switzerland) Marc Arn	P	4–5
(Switzerland) BSL Racing Team	Porsche 718 Cayman GT4 RS Clubsport	Porsche MDG.GA 4.0 L Flat-6	977	(Switzerland) Philipp Frommenwiler	P	4–5
(Switzerland) BSL Racing Team	Porsche 718 Cayman GT4 RS Clubsport	Porsche MDG.GA 4.0 L Flat-6	977	(Germany) Christoph Ruhrmann	P	4–5
(Switzerland) BSL Racing Team	Porsche 718 Cayman GT4 RS Clubsport	Porsche MDG.GA 4.0 L Flat-6	977	(Switzerland) Marcel Zimmermann	P	4–5
(Germany) Speedworxx Automotive	Porsche 718 Cayman GT4 RS Clubsport	Porsche MDG.GA 4.0 L Flat-6	971	(Germany) Erik Braun	PA	1–3, 6–10
(Germany) Speedworxx Automotive	Porsche 718 Cayman GT4 RS Clubsport	Porsche MDG.GA 4.0 L Flat-6	971	(Germany) Arne Hoffmeister	PA	1–3, 6–10
(Germany) Speedworxx Automotive	Porsche 718 Cayman GT4 RS Clubsport	Porsche MDG.GA 4.0 L Flat-6	971	(Germany) Franz Linden	PA	1–3, 6–10
(Germany) Speedworxx Automotive	Porsche 718 Cayman GT4 RS Clubsport	Porsche MDG.GA 4.0 L Flat-6	972	(Germany) Rüdiger Schicht	G	8
(Germany) Speedworxx Automotive	Porsche 718 Cayman GT4 RS Clubsport	Porsche MDG.GA 4.0 L Flat-6	972	(Germany) Erik Braun	G	8
(Germany) Speedworxx Automotive	Porsche 718 Cayman GT4 RS Clubsport	Porsche MDG.GA 4.0 L Flat-6	972	(Germany) Montana	G	8
(Germany) Team Extreme Racing	Porsche 718 Cayman GT4 RS Clubsport	Porsche MDG.GA 4.0 L Flat-6	977	(Germany) Nick Wüstenhagen	PA	3, 6–10
(Germany) Team Extreme Racing	Porsche 718 Cayman GT4 RS Clubsport	Porsche MDG.GA 4.0 L Flat-6	977	(Germany) Moritz Wiskirchen	PA	3, 7–9
(Germany) Team Extreme Racing	Porsche 718 Cayman GT4 RS Clubsport	Porsche MDG.GA 4.0 L Flat-6	977	(Germany) Fabio Sacchi	PA	3, 10
(Germany) Team Extreme Racing	Porsche 718 Cayman GT4 RS Clubsport	Porsche MDG.GA 4.0 L Flat-6	977	(Germany) John Lee Schambony	PA	6, 8–10
(Germany) Team Extreme Racing	Porsche 718 Cayman GT4 RS Clubsport	Porsche MDG.GA 4.0 L Flat-6	977	(Germany) Sebastian Brandl	PA	6
(Germany) Team Extreme Racing	Porsche 718 Cayman GT4 RS Clubsport	Porsche MDG.GA 4.0 L Flat-6	977	(Germany) Janina Schall	PA	7
(Germany) Kkrämer Racing	Porsche 718 Cayman GT4 RS Clubsport	Porsche MDG.GA 4.0 L Flat-6	978	(Germany) Karsten Krämer	Am	1
(Germany) Kkrämer Racing	Porsche 718 Cayman GT4 RS Clubsport	Porsche MDG.GA 4.0 L Flat-6	978	(Germany) Olaf Baunack	Am	4–5
(Germany) Kkrämer Racing	Porsche 718 Cayman GT4 RS Clubsport	Porsche MDG.GA 4.0 L Flat-6	978	(Germany) Michelangelo Comazzi	Am	4–5
(Germany) Kkrämer Racing	Porsche 718 Cayman GT4 RS Clubsport	Porsche MDG.GA 4.0 L Flat-6	978	(Germany) Marco Lamsouguer	Am	4–5
(Germany) Kkrämer Racing	Porsche 718 Cayman GT4 RS Clubsport	Porsche MDG.GA 4.0 L Flat-6	978	(Germany) Guido Tönnessen	Am	4–5
(Germany) Kkrämer Racing	Porsche 718 Cayman GT4 RS Clubsport	Porsche MDG.GA 4.0 L Flat-6	978	(Germany) Mario Handrick	G	2
(Germany) Kkrämer Racing	Porsche 718 Cayman GT4 RS Clubsport	Porsche MDG.GA 4.0 L Flat-6	978	(Germany) Olaf Baunack	G	2
(Germany) Kkrämer Racing	Porsche 718 Cayman GT4 RS Clubsport	Porsche MDG.GA 4.0 L Flat-6	978	(Germany) Marco Lamsouguer	G	2
(Germany) Lionspeed GP	Porsche 718 Cayman GT4 RS Clubsport	Porsche MDG.GA 4.0 L Flat-6	980	(United States) Adam Adelson	G	1, 3
(Germany) Lionspeed GP	Porsche 718 Cayman GT4 RS Clubsport	Porsche MDG.GA 4.0 L Flat-6	980	(United Kingdom) Jamie Green	G	1
(Germany) Lionspeed GP	Porsche 718 Cayman GT4 RS Clubsport	Porsche MDG.GA 4.0 L Flat-6	980	(France) Bruno Spengler	G	3
(Germany) Lionspeed GP	Porsche 718 Cayman GT4 RS Clubsport	Porsche MDG.GA 4.0 L Flat-6	980	(Sweden) Gustav Bergström	G	7
(Germany) Lionspeed GP	Porsche 718 Cayman GT4 RS Clubsport	Porsche MDG.GA 4.0 L Flat-6	980	(Luxembourg) Timmo Mol	G	7
(Germany) Lionspeed GP	Porsche 718 Cayman GT4 RS Clubsport	Porsche MDG.GA 4.0 L Flat-6	989	(Dominican Republic) Joel Monegro	G	3
(Germany) Lionspeed GP	Porsche 718 Cayman GT4 RS Clubsport	Porsche MDG.GA 4.0 L Flat-6	989	(United Kingdom) Jake Hill	G	3
(Germany) SEEBACH Motorsport	Porsche 718 Cayman GT4 RS Clubsport	Porsche MDG.GA 4.0 L Flat-6	980	(Germany) Levin Gelf	G	8–9
(Germany) SEEBACH Motorsport	Porsche 718 Cayman GT4 RS Clubsport	Porsche MDG.GA 4.0 L Flat-6	980	(Germany) Jannes Fittje	G	8–9
(Germany) Max Kruse Racing	Porsche 718 Cayman GT4 RS Clubsport	Porsche MDG.GA 4.0 L Flat-6	990	(Netherlands) Simon van Roon	G	7–9
(Germany) Max Kruse Racing	Porsche 718 Cayman GT4 RS Clubsport	Porsche MDG.GA 4.0 L Flat-6	990	(Netherlands) Rudy van Buren	G	7
(Germany) Max Kruse Racing	Porsche 718 Cayman GT4 RS Clubsport	Porsche MDG.GA 4.0 L Flat-6	990	(Netherlands) Tom Coronel	G	8
(Germany) Max Kruse Racing	Porsche 718 Cayman GT4 RS Clubsport	Porsche MDG.GA 4.0 L Flat-6	990	(Netherlands) Jan Jaap van Roon	G	9
(Belgium) Mühlner Motorsport	Porsche 718 Cayman GT4 RS Clubsport	Porsche MDG.GA 4.0 L Flat-6	999	(Ukraine) Oleksandr Kosohov	Am	4–5
(Belgium) Mühlner Motorsport	Porsche 718 Cayman GT4 RS Clubsport	Porsche MDG.GA 4.0 L Flat-6	999	(Canada) Maxwell Polzler	Am	4–5
(Belgium) Mühlner Motorsport	Porsche 718 Cayman GT4 RS Clubsport	Porsche MDG.GA 4.0 L Flat-6	999	(United States) Scott Speed	G	6
(Belgium) Mühlner Motorsport	Porsche 718 Cayman GT4 RS Clubsport	Porsche MDG.GA 4.0 L Flat-6	999	(Germany) Markus Bückle	G	7, 10
(Belgium) Mühlner Motorsport	Porsche 718 Cayman GT4 RS Clubsport	Porsche MDG.GA 4.0 L Flat-6	999	(Germany) Danny Brink	G	7
(Belgium) Mühlner Motorsport	Porsche 718 Cayman GT4 RS Clubsport	Porsche MDG.GA 4.0 L Flat-6	999	(Germany) Moritz Thomas Rosenbach	G	7
(Belgium) Mühlner Motorsport	Porsche 718 Cayman GT4 RS Clubsport	Porsche MDG.GA 4.0 L Flat-6	999	(Costa Rica) Amadeo Quiros	G	8–9
(Belgium) Mühlner Motorsport	Porsche 718 Cayman GT4 RS Clubsport	Porsche MDG.GA 4.0 L Flat-6	999	(Germany) Sascha Sieber	G	8–9
(Belgium) Mühlner Motorsport	Porsche 718 Cayman GT4 RS Clubsport	Porsche MDG.GA 4.0 L Flat-6	999	(France) Célia Martin	10	
(Belgium) Mühlner Motorsport	Porsche 718 Cayman GT4 RS Clubsport	Porsche MDG.GA 4.0 L Flat-6	999	(Germany) Kai Riemer		1
Entry Lists:

Icon	Class
992 entries
Icon	Class
P	Cup 2-Pro
PA	Cup 2-Pro/Am
Am	Cup 2-Am
G	Guest
Cayman GT4 entries
Icon	Class
P	Cup 3-Pro
PA	Cup 3-Pro/Am
Am	Cup 3-Am
G	Guest

=== Other classes ===
==== NLS specials ====
Team	Car	No.	Drivers	Rounds
SP-X
(Germany) HWA Engineering Speed	Mercedes-Benz 190E HWA EVO.R	61	(Germany) Christian Gebhardt	3–5
(Germany) HWA Engineering Speed	Mercedes-Benz 190E HWA EVO.R	61	(Norway) Evald Holstad	3–5
(Germany) HWA Engineering Speed	Mercedes-Benz 190E HWA EVO.R	61	(Germany) Sebastian Asch	3
(Germany) HWA Engineering Speed	Mercedes-Benz 190E HWA EVO.R	61	(Germany) Peter Ludwig	4–5
(Germany) HWA Engineering Speed	Mercedes-Benz 190E HWA EVO.R	61	(France) Bruno Spengler	4–5
(Germany) HWA Engineering Speed	Mercedes-Benz 190E HWA EVO.R	62	(United Kingdom) Jamie Green	3–5
(Germany) HWA Engineering Speed	Mercedes-Benz 190E HWA EVO.R	62	(Germany) Luca Ludwig	3–5
(Germany) HWA Engineering Speed	Mercedes-Benz 190E HWA EVO.R	62	(Germany) Lance David Arnold	3
(Germany) HWA Engineering Speed	Mercedes-Benz 190E HWA EVO.R	62	(Germany) Sebastian Asch	4–5
(Germany) HWA Engineering Speed	Mercedes-Benz 190E HWA EVO.R	62	(Germany) Markus Winkelhock	4–5
(Austria) Reiter Engineering	KTM X-Bow GTX	66	(Switzerland) Julien Apothéloz	2–3
(Austria) Reiter Engineering	KTM X-Bow GTX	66	(Switzerland) Miklas Born	2–3
(Austria) Reiter Engineering	KTM X-Bow GTX	66	(Germany) Arne Hoffmeister	2–3
(Austria) Reiter Engineering	KTM X-Bow GTX	66	(Germany) Marcel Johannes Marchewicz	3
(Germany) Schubert Motorsport	BMW M3 Touring 24H	81	(Germany) Jens Klingmann	2, 4–5
(Germany) Schubert Motorsport	BMW M3 Touring 24H	81	(Belgium) Ugo de Wilde	2
(Germany) Schubert Motorsport	BMW M3 Touring 24H	81	(United States) Connor De Phillippi	4–5
(Germany) Schubert Motorsport	BMW M3 Touring 24H	81	(United States) Neil Verhagen	4–5
SP-Pro
(Germany) Manthey Racing	Porsche 718 Cayman GT4 RS Clubsport M	13	(Canada) Orey Fidani	9
(Germany) Manthey Racing	Porsche 718 Cayman GT4 RS Clubsport M	13	(Germany) Lars Kern	9
(Germany) Manthey Racing	Porsche 992 GT3 Cup (992.1)	992	(Germany) Björn Griesemann	3–5, 7
(Germany) Manthey Racing	Porsche 992 GT3 Cup (992.1)	992	(Germany) Georg Griesemann	3–5, 7
(Germany) Manthey Racing	Porsche 992 GT3 Cup (992.1)	992	(Germany) Marco Holzer	3–5, 7
(Germany) Manthey Racing	Porsche 992 GT3 Cup (992.1)	992	(Germany) Dirk Adorf	4–5
SP8T
(Germany) Schubert Motorsport	BMW M2 CS Racing	145	(Germany) Juliano Holzem	1, 3
(Germany) Schubert Motorsport	BMW M2 CS Racing	145	(Sweden) Alfred Nilsson	1, 3
(Germany) Schubert Motorsport	BMW M2 CS Racing	145	(Germany) Sandro Holzem	3
SP7
(Poland) Apexwerk Racing	Porsche 718 Cayman GT4 RS Clubsport	69	(Poland) Damian Lempart	1–2
(Poland) Apexwerk Racing	Porsche 718 Cayman GT4 RS Clubsport	69	(Poland) Jacek Pydys	1–2
(Germany) asBest Racing	Porsche 718 Cayman GT4 RS Clubsport	70	(Switzerland) Marco Grilli	1
(Germany) asBest Racing	Porsche 718 Cayman GT4 RS Clubsport	70	(Germany) Sascha Sieber	10
(Germany) Team Motopark	Porsche 718 Cayman GT4 RS Clubsport	70	(Netherlands) Remon Vos	8–9
(Germany) Team Motopark	Porsche 718 Cayman GT4 RS Clubsport	70	(Germany) Timo Rumpfkeil	8–9
(Germany) RPM Racing	Porsche 991 Cup	71	(Belgium) Kris Cools	6–9
(Germany) RPM Racing	Porsche 991 Cup	71	(Czech Republic) Milan Kodídek	6–9
(Germany) RPM Racing	Porsche 991 Cup	71	(Germany) Ralf Schall	6–8
(Germany) RPM Racing	Porsche 991 Cup	71	(South Korea) Choi Jang-han	7
(Germany) RPM Racing	Porsche 991 Cup	71	(Germany) Jay Mo Härtling	9
(Germany) W&S Motorsport	Porsche 992 GT3	72	(Germany) Hendrik Still	7
(Germany) W&S Motorsport	Porsche 992 GT3	72	(Denmark) Michelle Gatting	7
(Germany) W&S Motorsport	Porsche 992 GT3	72	(Germany) Marco Seefried	7–8
(Germany) W&S Motorsport	Porsche 992 GT3	72	(Germany) Marco Holzer	8
(Germany) PROsport-Racing	Porsche Cayman Pro4	78	(Germany) Nico Hantke	10
(Germany) PROsport-Racing	Porsche Cayman Pro4	78	(Belgium) Nico Verdonck	10
(Germany) tm-racing.org	Porsche 718 Cayman GT4 RS Clubsport	82	(Germany) Benedikt Höpfer	1–6
(Germany) tm-racing.org	Porsche 718 Cayman GT4 RS Clubsport	82	(Germany) Marco Vitonelli	1–6
(Germany) tm-racing.org	Porsche 718 Cayman GT4 RS Clubsport	82	(Germany) Fabio Sacchi	1
(Germany) tm-racing.org	Porsche 718 Cayman GT4 RS Clubsport	82	(Germany) Michael Schröder	3–5
(Germany) tm-racing.org	Porsche 718 Cayman GT4 RS Clubsport	82	(Poland) Jacek Pydys	4–6
(Switzerland) BSL Racing Team	Porsche 718 Cayman GT4 MR	84	(Switzerland) Alexander Walker	8–9
(Switzerland) BSL Racing Team	Porsche 718 Cayman GT4 MR	84	(Switzerland) Philipp Hagnauer	8–9
(Switzerland) BSL Racing Team	Porsche 718 Cayman GT4 MR	84	(Poland) Jacek Pydys	8–9
(Germany) Up2Race	Porsche 718 Cayman GT4 RS Clubsport	89	(Germany) Christoph Ruhrmann	3
(Germany) Up2Race	Porsche 718 Cayman GT4 RS Clubsport	89	(Germany) Manfred Weber	3
(Austria) Reiter Engineering	Porsche 991 Cup	91	(Germany) Lukas Ertl	4–5
(Austria) Reiter Engineering	Porsche 991 Cup	91	(Germany) Maximilian Johannes Ertl	4–5
(Austria) Reiter Engineering	Porsche 991 Cup	91	(Germany) Stefan Ertl	4–5
	Porsche 718 Cayman GT4 RS Clubsport	169	(Germany) Paul Hochberger	7
	Porsche 718 Cayman GT4 RS Clubsport	169	(Germany) Tom Nittel	7
	Porsche 718 Cayman GT4 RS Clubsport	169	(Germany) Marco Reinbold	7
(Germany) Four Motors Bioconcept-Car	Porsche 718 Cayman GT4 RS Clubsport	420	(Germany) Henning Cramer	4–5, 8
(Germany) Four Motors Bioconcept-Car	Porsche 718 Cayman GT4 RS Clubsport	420	(Switzerland) Marc Schöni	4–5, 8
(Germany) Four Motors Bioconcept-Car	Porsche 718 Cayman GT4 RS Clubsport	420	(Germany) Oliver Sprungmann	4–5, 8
(Germany) Four Motors Bioconcept-Car	Porsche 718 Cayman GT4 RS Clubsport	420	(Australia) Yasser Shahin	7
(Germany) Four Motors Bioconcept-Car	Porsche 718 Cayman GT4 RS Clubsport	420	(Italy) Enzo Trulli	7
(Germany) Four Motors Bioconcept-Car	Porsche 718 Cayman GT4 RS Clubsport	420	(Finland) Marcus Amand	7
(Germany) Four Motors Bioconcept-Car	Porsche 718 Cayman GT4 RS Clubsport	420	(Germany) Jürgen Marzi	7
SP4T
(Germany) Max Kruse Racing	Volkswagen Golf GTI Clubsport 24h	76	(Germany) Timo Hochwind	2
(Germany) Max Kruse Racing	Volkswagen Golf GTI Clubsport 24h	76	(Sweden) Johan Kristoffersson	2
(Germany) Max Kruse Racing	Volkswagen Golf GTI Clubsport 24h	76	(Germany) Fabian Vettel	2
(Germany) Max Kruse Racing	Volkswagen Golf GTI Clubsport 24h	76	(Germany) Heiko Hammel	3
(Germany) Max Kruse Racing	Volkswagen Golf GTI Clubsport 24h	76	(South Africa) Jonathan Mogotsi	3
(Germany) Max Kruse Racing	Volkswagen Golf GTI Clubsport 24h	76	(Germany) Nico Otto	3
(Japan) Subaru Tecnica International	Subaru WRX STI GT N24	88	(Japan) Takuto Iguchi	4–5
(Japan) Subaru Tecnica International	Subaru WRX STI GT N24	88	(Japan) Kota Sasaki	4–5
(South Korea) Hyundai Motorsport N	Hyundai Elantra N1 RP	302	(Spain) Mikel Azcona	4–5
(South Korea) Hyundai Motorsport N	Hyundai Elantra N1 RP	302	(South Korea) Kim Young-chan	4–5
(South Korea) Hyundai Motorsport N	Hyundai Elantra N1 RP	302	(Germany) Mark Wallenwein	4–5
(South Korea) Hyundai Motorsport N	Hyundai Elantra N1 RP	303	(South Korea) Kim Gyu-min	4–5
(South Korea) Hyundai Motorsport N	Hyundai Elantra N1 RP	303	(Puerto Rico) Carlos Jose Sepulveda Irizarry	4–5
(South Korea) Hyundai Motorsport N	Hyundai Elantra N1 RP	303	(South Korea) Shin Woo-jin	4–5
(South Korea) Hyundai Motorsport N	Hyundai Elantra N1 RP	303	(Germany) Mark Wallenwein	4–5
SP4
(Germany) Kuepper Racing	BMW 325i	250	(Germany) Bernd Kuepper	1–3, 6
(Germany) Kuepper Racing	BMW 325i	250	(Germany) Kevin Küpper	1–3, 6
(Germany) Kuepper Racing	BMW 325i	250	(Germany) Michael Mönch	1–3
(Germany) Kuepper Racing	BMW 325i	250	(Germany) Carsten Welschar	3
(Germany) Oepen Motors Automobilsport	BMW 346C	254	(Germany) Ingo Oepen	1–3, 7–8, 10
(Germany) Oepen Motors Automobilsport	BMW 346C	254	(Germany) Christian Koger	1–3
(Germany) Oepen Motors Automobilsport	BMW 346C	254	(Germany) Henrik Launhardt	2, 10
(Germany) Oepen Motors Automobilsport	BMW 346C	254	(Germany) Thorsten Köppert	3, 7–8
(Germany) Oepen Motors Automobilsport	BMW 346C	254	(Germany) Ralph Hengesbach	7
SP3T
(Germany) Max Kruse Racing	Volkswagen Golf GTI Clubsport 24h	10	(Germany) Stephan Epp	6, 8
(Germany) Max Kruse Racing	Volkswagen Golf GTI Clubsport 24h	10	(Germany) Heiko Hammel	6
(Germany) Max Kruse Racing	Volkswagen Golf GTI Clubsport 24h	10	(Germany) Timo Hochwind	6
(Germany) Max Kruse Racing	Volkswagen Golf GTI Clubsport 24h	10	(Germany) Max Kruse	8–9
(Germany) Max Kruse Racing	Volkswagen Golf GTI Clubsport 24h	10	(Germany) Franco Fahrbach	8–9
(Germany) Max Kruse Racing	Volkswagen Golf GTI Clubsport 24h	10	(South Africa) Jonathan Mogotsi	8–9
(Germany) Ollis Garage Racing	Dacia Logan	300	(Germany) Oliver Kriese	1–7, 9
(Germany) Ollis Garage Racing	Dacia Logan	300	(Germany) Robert Neumann	3, 6–7
(Germany) Ollis Garage Racing	Dacia Logan	300	(Germany) Christian Geilfus	4–5
(Germany) Ollis Garage Racing	Dacia Logan	300	(Netherlands) Misha Charoudin	6
(Germany) Ollis Garage Racing	Dacia Logan	300	(Germany) Gregor Starck	7
(Germany) Ollis Garage Racing	Dacia Logan	300	(Germany) Fabian Henze	9
(Germany) asBest Racing	SEAT Cup Racer	303	(Germany) Maximilian Kochendörfer	10
(Germany) asBest Racing	SEAT Cup Racer	303	(Germany) Danny Brink	10
(Germany) asBest Racing	SEAT Cup Racer	303	(Germany) Sebastian Radermacher	10
(Germany) asBest Racing	Volkswagen Golf GTI TCR DSG	800	(Germany) Thomas Ardelt	4–5
(Germany) asBest Racing	Volkswagen Golf GTI TCR DSG	800	(Germany) Manuel Dormagen	4–5
(Germany) asBest Racing	Volkswagen Golf GTI TCR DSG	800	(Germany) Sven Oepen	4–5
(Germany) asBest Racing	SEAT Cupra TCR	808	(Germany) Jens Wulf	6–7
(Germany) asBest Racing	SEAT Cupra TCR	808	(Germany) Danny Brink	6
(Germany) asBest Racing	SEAT Cupra TCR	808	(Germany) Moritz Thomas Rosenbach	6
(Germany) asBest Racing	SEAT Cupra TCR	808	(Germany) Mark Trompeter	7
(Germany) asBest Racing	SEAT Cupra TCR	808	(Germany) Christian Andreas Franz	7
(Germany) Schmickler Performance powered by Ravenol	Porsche 982 Turbo	312	(Germany) Achim Wawer	3, 6, 8–10
(Germany) Schmickler Performance powered by Ravenol	Porsche 982 Turbo	312	(Germany) Claudius Karch	3, 6, 8–9
(Germany) Schmickler Performance powered by Ravenol	Porsche 982 Turbo	312	(Germany) Carsten Knechtges	8–10
(Germany) 2R Racing	Audi TT	317	(Germany) Wolfgang Haugg	3
(Germany) 2R Racing	Audi TT	317	(Germany) Rudi Speich	3
(Germany) 2R Racing	Audi TT	317	(Germany) Roland Waschkau	3
(Germany) Sharky Racing	Audi RS 3 LMS TCR (2017)	321	(France) Nathanaël Berthon	1–2
(Germany) Sharky Racing	Audi RS 3 LMS TCR (2017)	321	(Brazil) Pedro Carvalho Ebrahim	1–2
(Germany) Sharky Racing	Audi RS 3 LMS TCR (2017)	321	(Italy) Gian Maria Gabbiani	1
(Germany) Sharky Racing	Audi RS 3 LMS TCR (2017)	321	(Germany) Markus Bückle	2
(Germany) Sharky Racing	Audi RS 3 LMS TCR (2017)	321	(Germany) Moritz Thomas Rosenbach	2
(Germany) Sharky Racing	Audi RS 3 LMS TCR (2017)	321	(Austria) Tobias Poschik	6
(Germany) Sharky Racing	Audi RS 3 LMS TCR (2017)	321	(Germany) Lennard Falk von Canal	6
(Germany) Sharky Racing	Audi RS 3 LMS TCR (2017)	321	(Germany) Jann Jöge	7
(Germany) Sharky Racing	Audi RS 3 LMS TCR (2017)	321	(Germany) Justin Mücke	7
(Germany) Sharky Racing	Audi RS 3 LMS TCR (2017)	321	(Latvia) Ivars Vallers	7
(Germany) Sharky Racing	Cupra León TCR	322	(Germany) Markus Bückle	1–3
(Germany) Sharky Racing	Cupra León TCR	322	(Germany) Danny Brink	1–2
(Germany) Sharky Racing	Cupra León TCR	322	(Switzerland) Miklas Born	1
(Germany) Sharky Racing	Cupra León TCR	322	(Italy) Gian Maria Gabbiani	2–3
(Germany) Sharky Racing	Cupra León TCR	322	(Germany) Sascha Siegert	2
(Germany) Sharky Racing	Cupra León TCR	322	(Germany) Mats Heidler	3
(Germany) Sharky Racing	Cupra León TCR	322	(Germany) Carsten Kautz	3
(Germany) Autohaus Winterthur GmbH	Audi RS 3 LMS TCR DSG (2017)	323	(Switzerland) Armando Stanco	4–5
(Germany) Autohaus Winterthur GmbH	Audi RS 3 LMS TCR DSG (2017)	323	(Switzerland) Dario Stanco	4–5
	Volkswagen Golf VII TCR	323	(Bulgaria) Boyko Milanov Shopov	7
	Volkswagen Golf VII TCR	323	(Bulgaria) Yordan Mihaylov Stefanov	7
	Volkswagen Golf VII TCR	323	(Bulgaria) Aleksander Antoniev Yankov	7
	Volkswagen Golf VII TCR	323	(Bulgaria) Ventsislav Krasimirov Raychinov	7
	Mitsubishi Lancer CT9A	333	(Germany) Axel Duffner	6
	Mitsubishi Lancer CT9A	333	(Germany) Mario Fuchs	6
	Mitsubishi Lancer CT9A	333	(Germany) Eugen Weber	6
(Germany) Max Kruse Racing	Volkswagen Golf VII	819	(South Africa) Jonathan Mogotsi	2
(Germany) Max Kruse Racing	Volkswagen Golf VII	819	(Netherlands) Simon van Roon	2
(Germany) Max Kruse Racing	Volkswagen Golf VII	819	(Germany) Jens Dralle	3
(Germany) Max Kruse Racing	Volkswagen Golf VII	819	(Germany) Max Kruse	3
(Germany) Max Kruse Racing	Volkswagen Golf VII	819	(Germany) Christoph Lenz	3
(Germany) Max Kruse Racing	Volkswagen Golf VII	819	(Germany) Matthias Wasel	3
(Germany) Max Kruse Racing	Volkswagen Golf VII	819	(Germany) Carlos Fahrbach	7
(Germany) Max Kruse Racing	Volkswagen Golf VII	819	(Germany) Franco Fahrbach	7
(Germany) Max Kruse Racing	Volkswagen Golf VII	819	(Germany) Luca Wieninger	7
(Germany) Max Kruse Racing	Volkswagen Golf VII	819	(United States) Ren Messinger	10
(Germany) Max Kruse Racing	Volkswagen Golf VII	819	(United States) Rowan Gill	10
(Germany) Max Kruse Racing	Volkswagen Golf VII	819	(United States) John Salerno	10
SP3
(Germany) Ravenol Motorsport by MDM Racing	BMW 318ti	275	(Germany) Leo Geisler	4–5
(Germany) Ravenol Motorsport by MDM Racing	BMW 318ti	275	(United Kingdom) Michael Harris	4–5
SP2T
(Japan) Toyota Gazoo Rookie Racing	Toyota GR Yaris DAT Concept	109	(Japan) Daisuke Toyoda	1–2
(Japan) Toyota Gazoo Rookie Racing	Toyota GR Yaris DAT Concept	109	(Japan) Kazuki Nakajima	1
(Japan) Toyota Gazoo Rookie Racing	Toyota GR Yaris DAT Concept	109	(Japan) Hiroaki Ishiura	2
(Japan) Toyota Gazoo Rookie Racing	Toyota GR Yaris DAT Concept	109	(Japan) Kazuya Oshima	2
(Japan) Toyota Gazoo Rookie Racing	Toyota GR Yaris DAT Concept	110	(Japan) Daisuke Toyoda	1–2
(Japan) Toyota Gazoo Rookie Racing	Toyota GR Yaris DAT Concept	110	(Japan) Kazuki Nakajima	1
(Japan) Toyota Gazoo Rookie Racing	Toyota GR Yaris DAT Concept	110	(Japan) Hiroaki Ishiura	2
(Japan) Toyota Gazoo Rookie Racing	Toyota GR Yaris DAT Concept	110	(Japan) Kazuya Oshima	2
(Germany) Bitter Motorsport	Bitter Corsa	380	(Germany) Björn Morhin	2–5, 7–8, 10
(Germany) Bitter Motorsport	Bitter Corsa	380	(Germany) Christian Schäffer	2–5, 7–8, 10
(Germany) Bitter Motorsport	Bitter Corsa	380	(Germany) Katharina Lippka	2–3
(Germany) Bitter Motorsport	Bitter Corsa	380	(Germany) Volker Strycek	2, 7
(Germany) Bitter Motorsport	Bitter Corsa	380	(Germany) Jan Soumagne	3–5, 7–8, 10
(Germany) Bitter Motorsport	Bitter Corsa	380	(Germany) Lena Strycek	4–5
(Germany) Schumann Motorsport	Hyundai i30	381	(Germany) Alexander Planer	8–9
(Germany) Schumann Motorsport	Hyundai i30	381	(Germany) Armin Nickel	8–9
(Germany) Schumann Motorsport	Hyundai i30	381	(Germany) Marcel Radestock	8–9
(Germany) Ring Racing	Toyota GR Yaris	385	(Germany) Michael Tischner	7–10
(Germany) Ring Racing	Toyota GR Yaris	385	(Germany) Heiko Tönges	7–10
(Germany) Ring Racing	Toyota GR Yaris	385	(Germany) Uwe Kleen	7–8, 10
Entry Lists:

==== AT(-G) ====
Team	Car	No.	Drivers	Rounds
AT 1
(Germany) Max Kruse Racing	Audi R8 LMS GT3 Evo II	11	(Germany) Christian Kohlhaas	6–9
(Germany) Max Kruse Racing	Audi R8 LMS GT3 Evo II	11	(Switzerland) Christoph Lenz	6–9
(Germany) Max Kruse Racing	Audi R8 LMS GT3 Evo II	11	(Germany) Nico Otto	6, 10
(Germany) Max Kruse Racing	Audi R8 LMS GT3 Evo II	11	(Germany) Finn Zulauf	7–9
(Germany) Max Kruse Racing	Audi R8 LMS GT3 Evo II	11	(Germany) Benjamin Leuchter	10
(Germany) Max Kruse Racing	Audi R8 LMS GT3 Evo II	11	(Germany) Heiko Hammel	10
(Germany) Max Kruse Racing	Audi R8 LMS GT3 Evo II	19	(Netherlands) Jan Jaap van Roon	2–3, 7–8
(Germany) Max Kruse Racing	Audi R8 LMS GT3 Evo II	19	(Netherlands) Tom Coronel	2–3, 7, 9
(Germany) Max Kruse Racing	Audi R8 LMS GT3 Evo II	19	(Netherlands) Rudy van Buren	2
(Germany) Max Kruse Racing	Audi R8 LMS GT3 Evo II	19	(Germany) Christian Kohlhaas	3
(Germany) Max Kruse Racing	Audi R8 LMS GT3 Evo II	19	(Netherlands) Duncan Huisman	8–9
(Germany) Max Kruse Racing	Audi R8 LMS GT3 Evo II	75	(Germany) Dominik Fugel	1–3, 7–10
(Germany) Max Kruse Racing	Audi R8 LMS GT3 Evo II	75	(Germany) Marcel Fugel	1–3, 7–10
(Germany) Max Kruse Racing	Audi R8 LMS GT3 Evo II	75	(Germany) Benjamin Leuchter	1–3, 7–10
(Germany) équipe vitesse	Audi R8 LMS GT3 Evo II	18	(Germany) Carrie Schreiner	6, 8–9
(Germany) équipe vitesse	Audi R8 LMS GT3 Evo II	18	(Germany) Andreas Ziegler	6, 8–9
(Germany) équipe vitesse	Audi R8 LMS GT3 Evo II	18	(Germany) Roland Froese	6, 9
(Germany) équipe vitesse	Audi R8 LMS GT3 Evo II	18	(Germany) Alexander Kroker	8
AT 2
(Singapore) Giti Tire Motorsport by WS Racing	Porsche 992 GT3 Cup	146	(Germany) Janina Schall	1–5
(Singapore) Giti Tire Motorsport by WS Racing	Porsche 992 GT3 Cup	146	(Liechtenstein) Fabienne Wohlwend	1–5
(Singapore) Giti Tire Motorsport by WS Racing	Porsche 992 GT3 Cup	146	(Latvia) Patricija Stalidzane	1
(Singapore) Giti Tire Motorsport by WS Racing	Porsche 992 GT3 Cup	146	(Germany) Carrie Schreiner	2, 4–5
(Singapore) Giti Tire Motorsport by WS Racing	Porsche 992 GT3 Cup	146	(United Kingdom) Chloe Chong	3
(Singapore) Giti Tire Motorsport by WS Racing	Porsche 992 GT3 Cup	146	(Germany) Michelle Halder	4–5
(Singapore) Giti Tire Motorsport by WS Racing	Porsche 992 GT3 Cup	640	(Germany) Janina Schall	8–9
(Singapore) Giti Tire Motorsport by WS Racing	Porsche 992 GT3 Cup	640	(Liechtenstein) Fabienne Wohlwend	8–9
(Singapore) Giti Tire Motorsport by WS Racing	Porsche 992 GT3 Cup	640	(United Kingdom) Chloe Chong	8–9
(Germany) Four Motors Bioconcept-Car	Porsche 992 GT3 Cup	320	(Denmark) Henrik Bollerslev	4–5
(Germany) Four Motors Bioconcept-Car	Porsche 992 GT3 Cup	320	(Germany) Thomas von Löwis of Menar	4–5
(Germany) Four Motors Bioconcept-Car	Porsche 992 GT3 Cup	320	(Germany) Smudo	4–5
(Germany) Black Falcon Team Fanatec	Porsche 992 GT3 Cup	632	(United Kingdom) Jimmy Broadbent	1–5, 7–10
(Germany) Black Falcon Team Fanatec	Porsche 992 GT3 Cup	632	(United Kingdom) Steve Alvarez Brown	1–5, 7–10
(Germany) Black Falcon Team Fanatec	Porsche 992 GT3 Cup	632	(Netherlands) Misha Charoudin	1–5, 7–10
(Germany) Black Falcon Team Fanatec	Porsche 992 GT3 Cup	632	(Germany) Manuel Metzger	2–5, 7–10
(Germany) Manthey Racing	Porsche 718 Cayman GT4 RS CS M	718	(Germany) Björn Griesemann	1
(Germany) Manthey Racing	Porsche 718 Cayman GT4 RS CS M	718	(Germany) Georg Griesemann	1
(Germany) Manthey Racing	Porsche 718 Cayman GT4 RS CS M	718	(Germany) Marco Holzer	1
AT 3
(Germany) Max Kruse Racing	Volkswagen Golf GTI Clubsport 24h	10	(Germany) Max Kruse	1
(Germany) Max Kruse Racing	Volkswagen Golf GTI Clubsport 24h	10	(Switzerland) Christoph Lenz	1
(Germany) Max Kruse Racing	Volkswagen Golf GTI Clubsport 24h	10	(Germany) Matthias Wasel	1
(Germany) Max Kruse Racing	Volkswagen Golf GTI Clubsport 24h	76	(Germany) Heiko Hammel	1
(Germany) Max Kruse Racing	Volkswagen Golf GTI Clubsport 24h	76	(Germany) Timo Hochwind	1
(Germany) Max Kruse Racing	Volkswagen Golf GTI Clubsport 24h	76	(Germany) Nico Otto	1
(Germany) Max Kruse Racing	Volkswagen Golf VII	819	(Germany) Jens Dralle	1
(Germany) Max Kruse Racing	Volkswagen Golf VII	819	(South Africa) Jonathan Mogotsi	1
Entry Lists:

==== TCR ====
Team	Car	No.	Drivers	Rounds
(Germany) KMA-Racing	Volkswagen Golf GTI TCR DSG	89	(Germany) Dirk Groneck	4–5
(Germany) KMA-Racing	Volkswagen Golf GTI TCR DSG	89	(Germany) Marco Knappmeier	4–5
(Germany) Sharky Racing	Audi RS 3 LMS TCR (2021)	321	(Argentina) Jose Visir	8–9
(Germany) Sharky Racing	Audi RS 3 LMS TCR (2021)	321	(Argentina) Eduardo Romanelli	8–9
(Germany) Sharky Racing	Audi RS 3 LMS TCR (2021)	321	(Bulgaria) Alexandra Vateva	8–9
(Germany) Sharky Racing	Audi RS 3 LMS TCR (2021)	321	(Germany) Justin Mücke	9
(Norway) Møller Bil Motorsport	Audi RS 3 LMS TCR (2021)	801	(Norway) Kenneth Østvold	2–3, 6, 8, 10
(Norway) Møller Bil Motorsport	Audi RS 3 LMS TCR (2021)	801	(Norway) Håkon Schjærin	2–3, 6, 8, 10
(Norway) Møller Bil Motorsport	Audi RS 3 LMS TCR (2021)	801	(Norway) Atle Gulbrandsen	2, 6, 10
(Norway) Møller Bil Motorsport	Audi RS 3 LMS TCR (2021)	801	(Norway) Anders Lindstad	3, 8, 10
(Germany) asBest Racing	Cupra León TCR	808	(Germany) Jens Wulf	1, 3
(Germany) asBest Racing	Cupra León TCR	808	(Germany) Dennis Leißing	3
(Germany) asBest Racing	Cupra León TCR	808	(Germany) Mark Trompeter	3
(Latvia) LV Racing	Audi RS 3 LMS TCR (2021)	821	(Latvia) Ivars Vallers	3, 7–10
(Latvia) LV Racing	Audi RS 3 LMS TCR (2021)	821	(Germany) Philipp Eis	3, 8–10
(Latvia) LV Racing	Audi RS 3 LMS TCR (2021)	821	(Sweden) Mikaela Åhlin-Kottulinsky	3
(Latvia) LV Racing	Audi RS 3 LMS TCR (2021)	821	(Italy) Gian Maria Gabbiani	7–10
(Latvia) LV Racing	Audi RS 3 LMS TCR (2021)	821	(Austria) Tobias Poschik	7
(South Korea) Hyundai Motorsport N	Hyundai Elantra N TCR (2024)	830	(Spain) Mikel Azcona	4–5
(South Korea) Hyundai Motorsport N	Hyundai Elantra N TCR (2024)	830	(Germany) Marc Basseng	4–5
(South Korea) Hyundai Motorsport N	Hyundai Elantra N TCR (2024)	830	(Germany) Nico Bastian	4–5
(South Korea) Hyundai Motorsport N	Hyundai Elantra N TCR (2024)	830	(Germany) Manuel Lauck	4–5
Entry Lists:

==== NLS production cars ====
Team	Car	No.	Drivers	Rounds
V6
(Germany) Adrenalin Motorsport Team Mainhattan Wheels	Porsche Cayman S	396	(Germany) Christian Büllesbach	1–7, 10
(Germany) Adrenalin Motorsport Team Mainhattan Wheels	Porsche Cayman S	396	(Germany) Klaus Faßbender	1–7, 10
(Germany) Adrenalin Motorsport Team Mainhattan Wheels	Porsche Cayman S	396	(Germany) Andreas Schettler	1–7, 10
(Germany) Adrenalin Motorsport Team Mainhattan Wheels	Porsche Cayman S	396	(Germany) Daniel Zils	1–3, 6–7, 10
(Germany) Adrenalin Motorsport Team Mainhattan Wheels	Porsche Cayman S	396	(Spain) Carlos Arimon	4–5
(Germany) Schmickler Performance powered by Ravenol	Porsche 911	400	(Germany) Christian Heuchemer	1–3, 6–8
(Germany) Schmickler Performance powered by Ravenol	Porsche 911	400	(Germany) Thomas Heuchemer	1–3, 6–8
(Germany) Schmickler Performance powered by Ravenol	Porsche 911	400	(Germany) Sascha Kloft	2–3, 6–8
(Germany) rent2Drive-MEHRTEC-racing	Porsche Cayman GTS	410	(Switzerland) David Ackermann	1–2, 4–10
(Germany) rent2Drive-MEHRTEC-racing	Porsche Cayman GTS	410	(France) Jérôme Larbi	1–2, 4–10
(Germany) rent2Drive-MEHRTEC-racing	Porsche Cayman GTS	410	(Germany) Leo-Livius Arne Weber	1–2
(Germany) rent2Drive-MEHRTEC-racing	Porsche Cayman GTS	410	(Germany) Laurents Hörr	1
(Germany) rent2Drive-MEHRTEC-racing	Porsche Cayman GTS	410	(Germany) Csaba Walter	2
(Germany) rent2Drive-MEHRTEC-racing	Porsche Cayman GTS	410	(Italy) Stefano Croci	4–5
(Germany) rent2Drive-MEHRTEC-racing	Porsche Cayman GTS	410	(France) Joël Le Bihan	4–5
(Germany) rent2Drive-MEHRTEC-racing	Porsche Cayman GTS	410	(Germany) Stephan Epp	6
(Germany) rent2Drive-MEHRTEC-racing	Porsche Cayman GTS	410	(Germany) Stefan Müller	6
(Germany) rent2Drive-MEHRTEC-racing	Porsche Cayman GTS	410	(Germany) Marco Vitonelli	7–9
(Germany) rent2Drive-MEHRTEC-racing	Porsche Cayman GTS	410	(Germany) Alexander Weber	7
(Germany) rent2Drive-MEHRTEC-racing	Porsche Cayman GTS	410	(United Kingdom) Spandexia	8
(Germany) rent2Drive-MEHRTEC-racing	Porsche Cayman GTS	410	(Germany) Tobias Kracht	9–10
	Porsche Cayman S	415	(Germany) Christian Weber	8–10
	Porsche Cayman S	415	(Germany) Benedikt Höpfer	8–9
	Porsche Cayman S	415	(Germany) Alexander Müller	10
	Porsche Cayman S	415	(Germany) Torsten Krey	10
(Germany) Köppen Motorsport	Porsche 911	416; 415	(Germany) Sebastian Rings	2, 4–5, 8–10
(Germany) Köppen Motorsport	Porsche 911	416; 415	(Germany) Maximilian Arnold	2, 4–5, 8–9
(Germany) Köppen Motorsport	Porsche 911	416; 415	(Germany) Bastian Arend	2, 4–5
(Germany) Köppen Motorsport	Porsche 911	416; 415	(Germany) Alexander Köppen	4–5, 8–10
V5
	Porsche Cayman	440	(Germany) Florian Layer	7
	Porsche Cayman	440	(Germany) Andreas Müller	7
	Porsche Cayman	440	(Germany) Florian Quante	7
(Germany) Adrenalin Motorsport Team Mainhattan Wheels	Porsche Cayman	444	(Germany) Daniel Korn	All
(Germany) Adrenalin Motorsport Team Mainhattan Wheels	Porsche Cayman	444	(Germany) Tobias Korn	All
(Germany) Adrenalin Motorsport Team Mainhattan Wheels	Porsche Cayman	444	(Germany) Ulrich Korn	All
(Germany) rent2Drive-MEHRTEC-racing	Porsche Cayman	445	(Switzerland) David Ackermann	3
(Germany) rent2Drive-MEHRTEC-racing	Porsche Cayman	445	(Germany) Happinessa	3
(Germany) rent2Drive-MEHRTEC-racing	Porsche Cayman	445	(France) Jérôme Larbi	3
(Germany) rent2Drive-MEHRTEC-racing	Porsche Cayman	445	(Germany) Leo-Livius Arne Weber	3
(Germany) rent2Drive-MEHRTEC-racing	Porsche Cayman	445	(France) Joël Le Bihan	8–9
(Germany) rent2Drive-MEHRTEC-racing	Porsche Cayman	445	(Spain) Manuel Canizares Tortosa	8, 10
(Germany) rent2Drive-MEHRTEC-racing	Porsche Cayman	445	(Germany) Alexander Weber	8
(Germany) rent2Drive-MEHRTEC-racing	Porsche Cayman	445	(Germany) Tobias Kracht	8
(Germany) rent2Drive-MEHRTEC-racing	Porsche Cayman	445	(Germany) Marcel Weber	9
(Germany) rent2Drive-MEHRTEC-racing	Porsche Cayman	445	(Germany) Georg Arbinger	10
(Germany) rent2Drive-MEHRTEC-racing	Porsche Cayman	445	(Germany) Stefano Croci	10
(Germany) tm-racing.org	Porsche Cayman	446	(Germany) Sebastian Brandl	1–2, 10
(Germany) tm-racing.org	Porsche Cayman	446	(Germany) Michael Schröder	1–2
(Germany) tm-racing.org	Porsche Cayman	446	(Germany) Benedikt Höpfer	10
(Germany) tm-racing.org	Porsche Cayman	446	(Germany) Moritz Terhar	10
(Germany) tm-racing.org	Porsche Cayman	448	(Germany) Matthias Beckwermert	4–5
(Germany) tm-racing.org	Porsche Cayman	448	(Germany) Philip Klinkmüller	4–5
(Germany) tm-racing.org	Porsche Cayman 981	447	(Germany) Matthias Beckwermert	1–3, 6–10
(Germany) tm-racing.org	Porsche Cayman 981	447	(Germany) Philip Klinkmüller	1–3, 6–10
(Germany) Pure Racing	Porsche Cayman CM12	455	(Sweden) Peter Baumann	2
(Germany) Pure Racing	Porsche Cayman CM12	455	(Germany) Matthias Trinius	2
(Germany) Pure Racing	Porsche Cayman CM12	455	(Germany) Thorsten Held	2
V4
	BMW E90 325i	730	(Germany) Mark Monhof	7, 10
	BMW E90 325i	730	(Germany) Daniel Syrzisko	7, 10
	BMW E90 325i	730	(Germany) Sascha Korte	7
V3
	BMW 318is	529	(Germany) Manfred Schmitz	3, 6–9
	BMW 318is	529	(Germany) Katja Thomas	3, 6–9
	BMW 318is	529	(Germany) Reiner Thomas	3, 6–9
VT3
(Germany) MSC Sinzig e.V. im ADAC	Audi S3	59	(Germany) Rudi Speich	7
(Germany) MSC Sinzig e.V. im ADAC	Audi S3	59	(Germany) Dirk Vleugels	7
(Germany) MSC Sinzig e.V. im ADAC	Audi S3	59	(Germany) Roland Waschkau	7
VT2-FWD+4WD
(Germany) Jung Motorsport	Cupra Leon	470	(Germany) Michael Eichhorn	All
(Germany) Jung Motorsport	Cupra Leon	470	(Germany) Tobias Jung	All
(Germany) Jung Motorsport	Cupra Leon	470	(Germany) Marcel Unland	All
(Germany) Jung Motorsport	Cupra Leon	470	(Germany) Markus Weinstock	All
(Germany) Jung Motorsport	Cupra Leon	472	(Germany) Lars Füting	1–9
(Germany) Jung Motorsport	Cupra Leon	472	(Germany) Maximilian Simons	1–6, 8–9
(Germany) Jung Motorsport	Cupra Leon	472	(Germany) Tobias Jung	1–3, 7
(Germany) Jung Motorsport	Cupra Leon	472	(Germany) Eugen Weber	1, 3
(Germany) Jung Motorsport	Cupra Leon	472	(Germany) Marc Etzkorn	4–5, 10
(Germany) Jung Motorsport	Cupra Leon	472	(Thailand) Thanathip Thanalapanan	4–5
(Germany) Jung Motorsport	Cupra Leon	472	(Germany) Yannick Bieniek	6, 9
(Germany) Jung Motorsport	Cupra Leon	472	(Germany) Tim Robertz	6
(Germany) Jung Motorsport	Cupra Leon	472	(Germany) Giancarlo-Gino Lührs	7
(Germany) Jung Motorsport	Cupra Leon	472	(Germany) Michael Eichhorn	7
(Germany) Jung Motorsport	Cupra Leon	472	(Germany) Jens Wulf	8–10
(Germany) Jung Motorsport	Cupra Leon	472	(Germany) Sascha Siegert	8
(Germany) Jung Motorsport	Cupra Leon	472	(Germany) Achim Ewenz	10
	Cupra Leon	471	(Netherlands) Chris Rothoff	6, 8
	Cupra Leon	471	(Germany) Elias Funke	6
	Cupra Leon	471	(Germany) Andre Kern	6
(Germany) Time Attack Paderborn by GTÜ Wieseler	Volkswagen Golf 7.5	474	(Switzerland) Boris Hrubesch	3
(Germany) Time Attack Paderborn by GTÜ Wieseler	Volkswagen Golf 7.5	474	(Germany) Fabian Tillmann	3
(Germany) Time Attack Paderborn by GTÜ Wieseler	Volkswagen Golf 7.5	474	(Germany) Michael Wolpertinger	3
(Germany) asBest Racing	Volkswagen Scirocco	477	(Germany) Bastian Beck	1
(Germany) asBest Racing	Volkswagen Scirocco	477	(Germany) Thomas Mennecke	3–5, 7
(Germany) asBest Racing	Volkswagen Scirocco	477	(Germany) Maximilian Kochendörfer	3, 7
(Germany) asBest Racing	Volkswagen Scirocco	477	(Germany) Christian Schier	4–5
(Germany) asBest Racing	Volkswagen Scirocco	477	(Germany) Sebastian Radermacher	6–7
(Germany) asBest Racing	Volkswagen Scirocco	477	(Germany) Alex Schneider	6
(Germany) Dupré Engineering	Audi S3	480	(Germany) Christoph Dupré	All
(Germany) Dupré Engineering	Audi S3	480	(Germany) Jürgen Nett	All
(Germany) Dupré Engineering	Audi S3	480	(Germany) Joachim Nett	All
(Germany) Ollis Garage Racing	Renault Mégane RS	481	(Germany) Oliver Kriese	3, 8
(Germany) Ollis Garage Racing	Renault Mégane RS	481	(Germany) Christian Geilfus	3
(Germany) Ollis Garage Racing	Renault Mégane RS	481	(Germany) Fabian Henze	8
(Germany) SRS Team Sorg Rennsport	BMW 128ti	488	(Germany) Daniel Alger	1–5
(Germany) SRS Team Sorg Rennsport	BMW 128ti	488	(Germany) Nick Deißler	1–5
(Germany) SRS Team Sorg Rennsport	BMW 128ti	488	(Belgium) Kobe Pauwels	2
(Germany) SRS Team Sorg Rennsport	BMW 128ti	488	(Netherlands) Tijmen van der Helm	3
(Germany) SRS Team Sorg Rennsport	BMW 128ti	488	(Netherlands) Calvin de Groot	4–5
(Germany) mathilda racing	Volkswagen Scirocco R	490	(Germany) Michael Paatz	10
(Germany) mathilda racing	Volkswagen Scirocco R	490	(Germany) Mathilda Paatz	10
(Germany) STENLE Marketing by Mertens Motorsport	Hyundai i30N	491	(Germany) Ralf Wiesner	1–7
(Germany) STENLE Marketing by Mertens Motorsport	Hyundai i30N	491	(Germany) Richard Schäfer	1–5, 7–8
(Germany) STENLE Marketing by Mertens Motorsport	Hyundai i30N	491	(United States) Jeff Ricca	1, 3–8
(Germany) STENLE Marketing by Mertens Motorsport	Hyundai i30N	491	(Belgium) Jarno D'Hauw	8
(Germany) STENLE Marketing by Mertens Motorsport	Hyundai i30N	492	(Puerto Rico) Carlos Jose Sepulveda Irizarry	1, 3
(Germany) STENLE Marketing by Mertens Motorsport	Hyundai i30N	492	(South Korea) Shin Woo-jin	1, 3
(Germany) STENLE Marketing by Mertens Motorsport	Hyundai i30N	492	(Germany) Fabian Tillmann	1, 7, 10
(Germany) STENLE Marketing by Mertens Motorsport	Hyundai i30N	492	(Germany) Richard Schäfer	6, 9–10
(Germany) STENLE Marketing by Mertens Motorsport	Hyundai i30N	492	(Germany) Christian Alexander Dannesberger	6
(Germany) STENLE Marketing by Mertens Motorsport	Hyundai i30N	492	(Germany) Niklas Walter	6
(Germany) STENLE Marketing by Mertens Motorsport	Hyundai i30N	492	(United States) Jeff Ricca	7, 9
(Germany) STENLE Marketing by Mertens Motorsport	Hyundai i30N	492	(Canada) Shelby Mills	7
(Germany) STENLE Marketing by Mertens Motorsport	Hyundai i30N	496	(Puerto Rico) Carlos Jose Sepulveda Irizarry	3–5
(Germany) STENLE Marketing by Mertens Motorsport	Hyundai i30N	496	(South Korea) Shin Woo-jin	3
(Germany) STENLE Marketing by Mertens Motorsport	Hyundai i30N	496	(United States) Jeff Ricca	4–5
(Germany) FS Motorsport	Volkswagen Golf 8 GTI Clubsport	494	(Brazil) Flavia Pellegrino Fernandes	All
(Germany) FS Motorsport	Volkswagen Golf 8 GTI Clubsport	494	(Germany) Thomas Schönfeld	All
(Germany) FS Motorsport	Volkswagen Golf 8 GTI Clubsport	494	(Germany) Tom Schütze	1–3
(Germany) FS Motorsport	Volkswagen Golf 8 GTI Clubsport	494	(Germany) Alex Schneider	4–5
(Germany) FS Motorsport	Volkswagen Golf 8 GTI Clubsport	494	(Germany) Sebastian Disch	6
(Germany) FS Motorsport	Volkswagen Golf 8 GTI Clubsport	494	(Germany) Dennis Surace	7–8
(Germany) FS Motorsport	Volkswagen Golf 8 GTI Clubsport	494	(Germany) Tobias Neuber	8–10
(Germany) FS Motorsport	Volkswagen Golf 8.5 GTI Clubsport	495	(Germany) Michael Bohrer	All
(Germany) FS Motorsport	Volkswagen Golf 8.5 GTI Clubsport	495	(Germany) Pascal Otto Fritzsche	All
(Germany) FS Motorsport	Volkswagen Golf 8.5 GTI Clubsport	495	(Germany) Alex Schneider	7
VT2-RWD
(Germany) Schmickler Performance powered by Ravenol	BMW 230i	55	(Israel) Hagay Farran	1–7
(Germany) Schmickler Performance powered by Ravenol	BMW 230i	55	(Israel) Moran Gott	1–7
(Germany) Adrenalin Motorsport Team Mainhattan Wheels	BMW 330i	500	(Germany) Philipp Leisen	1–8, 10
(Germany) Adrenalin Motorsport Team Mainhattan Wheels	BMW 330i	500	(Germany) Philipp Stahlschmidt	1–8, 10
(Germany) Adrenalin Motorsport Team Mainhattan Wheels	BMW 330i	500	(Germany) Daniel Zils	1–8, 10
(Germany) Adrenalin Motorsport Team Mainhattan Wheels	BMW 330i	501	(United Kingdom) Harry King	1
(Germany) Adrenalin Motorsport Team Mainhattan Wheels	BMW 330i	501	(China) Lin Weixiong	2
(Germany) Adrenalin Motorsport Team Mainhattan Wheels	BMW 330i	501	(China) Yang Haoyu	2
(Germany) Adrenalin Motorsport Team Mainhattan Wheels	BMW 330i	501	(Argentina) Nano Lopez	4–5
(Germany) Adrenalin Motorsport Team Mainhattan Wheels	BMW 330i	501	(United States) Ren Messinger	4–5
(Germany) Adrenalin Motorsport Team Mainhattan Wheels	BMW 330i	501	(Germany) Sub7BTG	4–5
(Germany) Adrenalin Motorsport Team Mainhattan Wheels	BMW 330i	501	(Germany) Matthias Trinius	4–5
(Singapore) Giti Tire Motorsport by WS Racing	BMW 330i	502	(Germany) Niklas Ehrhardt	1–2
(Singapore) Giti Tire Motorsport by WS Racing	BMW 330i	502	(Germany) Thomas Ehrhardt	1–2
(Singapore) Giti Tire Motorsport by WS Racing	BMW 330i	502	(Germany) Fabian Pirrone	1–2
(Singapore) Giti Tire Motorsport by WS Racing	BMW 330i	502	(Germany) Elena Egger	3, 9
(Singapore) Giti Tire Motorsport by WS Racing	BMW 330i	502	(Sweden) Siri Hökfelt	3
(Singapore) Giti Tire Motorsport by WS Racing	BMW 330i	502	(Estonia) Carmen Kraav	3
(Singapore) Giti Tire Motorsport by WS Racing	BMW 330i	502	(Japan) Takashi Ito	9
(Singapore) Giti Tire Motorsport by WS Racing	BMW 330i	503	(Germany) Elena Egger	4–5
(Singapore) Giti Tire Motorsport by WS Racing	BMW 330i	503	(Sweden) Siri Hökfelt	4–5
(Singapore) Giti Tire Motorsport by WS Racing	BMW 330i	503	(Germany) Helge Tamm	4–5
(Singapore) Giti Tire Motorsport by WS Racing	Toyota Supra	503	(Germany) Elena Egger	1–2
(Singapore) Giti Tire Motorsport by WS Racing	Toyota Supra	503	(Sweden) Siri Hökfelt	1–2
(Singapore) Giti Tire Motorsport by WS Racing	Toyota Supra	503	(Estonia) Carmen Kraav	1–2
(Singapore) Giti Tire Motorsport by WS Racing	Toyota Supra	503	(Germany) Fabian Pirrone	3, 10
(Singapore) Giti Tire Motorsport by WS Racing	Toyota Supra	503	(Germany) Niklas Ehrhardt	3
(Singapore) Giti Tire Motorsport by WS Racing	Toyota Supra	503	(Germany) Thomas Ehrhardt	3
(Singapore) Giti Tire Motorsport by WS Racing	Toyota Supra	503	(Germany) Ingo Horst	10
(Singapore) Giti Tire Motorsport by WS Racing	Toyota Supra	503	(Germany) Lutz Horst	10
(Singapore) Giti Tire Motorsport by WS Racing	BMW 228i	506	(United Kingdom) Chloe Chong	1–2
(Singapore) Giti Tire Motorsport by WS Racing	BMW 228i	506	(Germany) Dennis Garbe	1–2
(Singapore) Giti Tire Motorsport by WS Racing	BMW 228i	506	(Germany) John Lee Schambony	1–2
(Singapore) Giti Tire Motorsport by WS Racing	BMW 228i	506	(Austria) Elena Egger	6
(Singapore) Giti Tire Motorsport by WS Racing	BMW 228i	506	(Sweden) Siri Hökfelt	6
(Singapore) Giti Tire Motorsport by WS Racing	BMW 228i	506	(Germany) Ingo Horst	6
(Singapore) Giti Tire Motorsport by WS Racing	BMW 228i	506	(Germany) Helge Tamm	6
(Singapore) Giti Tire Motorsport by WS Racing	BMW 230i	509	(Austria) Elena Egger	7
(Singapore) Giti Tire Motorsport by WS Racing	BMW 230i	509	(Germany) Helge Tamm	7
(Singapore) Giti Tire Motorsport by WS Racing	BMW 230i	509	(Germany) Hubert Winzer	7
(Singapore) Giti Tire Motorsport by WS Racing	BMW 230i	509	(Germany) Tabea Jünger	7
(Singapore) Giti Tire Motorsport by WS Racing	BMW 230i	509	(Japan) Takashi Ito	8
(Singapore) Giti Tire Motorsport by WS Racing	BMW 230i	509	(Luxembourg) Graham Wilson	8
(Germany) SRS Team Sorg Rennsport	BMW 330i	504	(Germany) Daniel Alger	1
(Germany) SRS Team Sorg Rennsport	BMW 330i	504	(Germany) Nick Deißler	1
(Germany) SRS Team Sorg Rennsport	BMW 330i	504	(Germany) Max Schlichenmeier	1
(Germany) SRS Team Sorg Rennsport	BMW 330i	504	(Germany) Mathias Baar	10
(Germany) SRS Team Sorg Rennsport	BMW 330i	504	(Netherlands) Remon Jager	10
(Germany) SRS Team Sorg Rennsport	BMW 330i	514	(United Kingdom) Jake Hill	1, 3
(Germany) SRS Team Sorg Rennsport	BMW 330i	514	(Germany) Kurt Strube	1, 4–7
(Germany) SRS Team Sorg Rennsport	BMW 330i	514	(Australia) Campbell Nunn	1
(Germany) SRS Team Sorg Rennsport	BMW 330i	514	(South Korea) Lee Chang-uk	2
(Germany) SRS Team Sorg Rennsport	BMW 330i	514	(South Korea) Lee Jung-woo	2
(Germany) SRS Team Sorg Rennsport	BMW 330i	514	(United States) Adam Adelson	3
(Germany) SRS Team Sorg Rennsport	BMW 330i	514	(France) Bruno Spengler	3
(Germany) SRS Team Sorg Rennsport	BMW 330i	514	(Netherlands) Tijmen van der Helm	3
(Germany) SRS Team Sorg Rennsport	BMW 330i	514	(Italy) Alberto Carobbio	4–5
(Germany) SRS Team Sorg Rennsport	BMW 330i	514	(Germany) Heinz-Jürgen Kroner	4–5
(Germany) SRS Team Sorg Rennsport	BMW 330i	514	(Italy) Ugo Vicenzi	4–5
(Germany) SRS Team Sorg Rennsport	BMW 330i	514	(Republic of Ireland) Jayden Kelly	6
(Germany) SRS Team Sorg Rennsport	BMW 330i	514	(Germany) Luciano Schneider	6
(Germany) SRS Team Sorg Rennsport	BMW 330i	514	(United States) Alejandro Gutierrez	7
(Germany) SRS Team Sorg Rennsport	BMW 330i	514	(Germany) Rainer Gelhaus	7
(Germany) SRS Team Sorg Rennsport	BMW 330i	514	(Germany) Lars Duckek	7
(Germany) SRS Team Sorg Rennsport	BMW 330i	514	(United Kingdom) Miles Wragg	10
(Germany) SRS Team Sorg Rennsport	BMW 330i	514	(Netherlands) Jesse Uddoh	10
(Germany) SRS Team Sorg Rennsport	BMW 330i	514	(Germany) Ole Scharp	10
(Germany) SRS Team Sorg Rennsport	Toyota Supra	524	(Netherlands) Piet-Jan Ooms	All
(Germany) SRS Team Sorg Rennsport	Toyota Supra	524	(Italy) Ionuc Catalin Timis	All
(Germany) SRS Team Sorg Rennsport	Toyota Supra	524	(Netherlands) Tijmen van der Helm	1
(Germany) SRS Team Sorg Rennsport	Toyota Supra	524	(United Kingdom) Tom Fleming	2
(Germany) SRS Team Sorg Rennsport	Toyota Supra	524	(Austria) Kiano Blum	3
(Germany) SRS Team Sorg Rennsport	Toyota Supra	524	(United States) Rafael Torres	4–5
(Germany) SRS Team Sorg Rennsport	Toyota Supra	524	(United Kingdom) Charlie Fagg	6
(Germany) SRS Team Sorg Rennsport	Toyota Supra	524	(Italy) Francesco Bugane	7
(Germany) Keeevin Motorsport	BMW F30	505	(Germany) Serge van Vooren	1–6, 8–9
(Germany) Keeevin Motorsport	BMW F30	505	(Poland) Nikodem Silecki	1–2
(Germany) Keeevin Motorsport	BMW F30	505	(Germany) Matthias Aretz	1, 3–6, 8–9
(Germany) Keeevin Motorsport	BMW F30	505	(Germany) Christoph Blümer	2
(Germany) Keeevin Motorsport	BMW F30	505	(Germany) Axel Duffner	4–5
(Germany) Keeevin Motorsport	BMW F30	505	(Germany) Thomas Plum	6
(Germany) Keeevin Motorsport	BMW F30	505	(Germany) Christian Scherer	7
(Germany) Keeevin Motorsport	BMW F30	505	(Germany) Andreas Schmidt	7
(Germany) Keeevin Motorsport	BMW F30	505	(Germany) Jörg Schönfelder	8–9
(Germany) Keeevin Motorsport	BMW F30	505	(Bulgaria) Ivaylo Asenov	10
(Germany) Keeevin Motorsport	BMW F30	505	(Bulgaria) Yordan Mihaylov Stefanov	10
(Germany) Keeevin Motorsport	BMW F30	505	(Bulgaria) Ventsislav Krasimirov Raychinov	10
(Lithuania) Juta Racing	BMW 330i	507	(Kazakhstan) Alexandr Artemyev	6
(Lithuania) Juta Racing	BMW 330i	507	(Lithuania) Arunas Geciauskas	6
(Lithuania) Juta Racing	BMW 330i	507	(United Kingdom) Lars Viljoen	6
(Germany) Speedbeat Motorsport	BMW 330i	508	(Germany) Christian Koch	6–7
(Germany) Speedbeat Motorsport	BMW 330i	508	(Germany) Andreas Pöschko	6–7
(Germany) Speedbeat Motorsport	BMW 330i	508	(Germany) Beat Schmitz	6–7
(Germany) Speedbeat Motorsport	BMW 330i	508	(Germany) Andre Sommerberg	6–7
(Germany) Manheller Racing	BMW F30	510	(Portugal) Guilherme Oliveira	1–2
(Germany) Manheller Racing	BMW F30	510	(United Kingdom) Sandy Mitchell	1, 3
(Germany) Manheller Racing	BMW F30	510	(Spain) Lluc Ibáñez	2
(Germany) Manheller Racing	BMW F30	510	(Spain) Nil Montserrat	2
(Germany) Manheller Racing	BMW F30	510	(Germany) Max Reis	3
(Germany) Manheller Racing	Toyota Supra	515	(Germany) Marcel Manheller	7–8, 10
(Germany) Manheller Racing	Toyota Supra	515	(Germany) Harald Barth	7–8, 10
(Germany) Manheller Racing	Toyota Supra	515	(Germany) Markus Schiller	7
(Germany) Manheller Racing	Toyota Supra	515	(Belgium) Jean-Luc Behets	8
	BMW F30	511	(Netherlands) Lars van 't Veer	3
	BMW F30	511	(Germany) Benjamin Baller	3
	BMW F30	511	(Netherlands) Ralf Jaspers	3
(Germany) Teichmann Racing	Toyota Supra VT2	512	(Australia) Kenny Habul	1
(Germany) Teichmann Racing	Toyota Supra VT2	512	(Germany) Daniel Schwerfeld	1
RAVENOL Japan	Toyota Supra	519	(Germany) Manfred Röss	3–5
RAVENOL Japan	Toyota Supra	519	(Germany) Matthias Röss	3–5
RAVENOL Japan	Toyota Supra	519	(Germany) Malte Tack	3–5
(Germany) Toyo Tires with Ring Racing	Toyota Supra	520	(Japan) Takuma Miyazono	1–8
(Germany) Toyo Tires with Ring Racing	Toyota Supra	520	(Japan) Jin Horino	1–2, 4–5, 7
(Germany) Toyo Tires with Ring Racing	Toyota Supra	520	(Japan) Masato Kawabata	1, 4–6, 10
(Germany) Toyo Tires with Ring Racing	Toyota Supra	520	(Japan) Hideyuki Fujino	2–3, 8–9
(Germany) Toyo Tires with Ring Racing	Toyota Supra	520	(Japan) Hokuto Matsuyama	3, 8–10
	BMW 330i	522	(Netherlands) Lin Hodenius	1, 3
	BMW 330i	522	(United Kingdom) David Pittard	1
	BMW 330i	522	(Germany) Philip Stern	3
Entry Lists:

==== BMW Cup Classes ====
Team	Car	No.	Drivers	Rounds
BMW M240i
(Germany) Adrenalin Motorsport Team Mainhattan Wheels	BMW M240i Racing Cup	650	(Italy) Edoardo Bugane	1–5, 7–10
(Germany) Adrenalin Motorsport Team Mainhattan Wheels	BMW M240i Racing Cup	650	(Germany) Sven Markert	1–5, 7–10
(Germany) Adrenalin Motorsport Team Mainhattan Wheels	BMW M240i Racing Cup	650	(Germany) Yannick Fübrich	2–5, 7–10
(Germany) Adrenalin Motorsport Team Mainhattan Wheels	BMW M240i Racing Cup	650	(Germany) Tim Lukas Müller	2–3
(Germany) Adrenalin Motorsport Team Mainhattan Wheels	BMW M240i Racing Cup	650	(Germany) Benjamin Albers	4–5
(Germany) Adrenalin Motorsport Team Mainhattan Wheels	BMW M240i Racing Cup	650	(Germany) Lars Harbeck	6
(Germany) Adrenalin Motorsport Team Mainhattan Wheels	BMW M240i Racing Cup	650	(Argentina) Nano Lopez	6
(Germany) Adrenalin Motorsport Team Mainhattan Wheels	BMW M240i Racing Cup	650	(Germany) Tim Tramnitz	6
(Germany) Adrenalin Motorsport Team Mainhattan Wheels	BMW M240i Racing Cup	651	(Germany) Benjamin Albers	1–5
(Germany) Adrenalin Motorsport Team Mainhattan Wheels	BMW M240i Racing Cup	651	(Argentina) Santiago Baztarrica	1–5
(Germany) Adrenalin Motorsport Team Mainhattan Wheels	BMW M240i Racing Cup	651	(United States) Nico Silva	1–5
(Germany) Adrenalin Motorsport Team Mainhattan Wheels	BMW M240i Racing Cup	651	(Germany) Tim Lukas Müller	4–6
(Germany) Adrenalin Motorsport Team Mainhattan Wheels	BMW M240i Racing Cup	651	(Italy) Edoardo Bugane	6
(Germany) Adrenalin Motorsport Team Mainhattan Wheels	BMW M240i Racing Cup	651	(Germany) Yannick Fübrich	6
(Germany) Adrenalin Motorsport Team Mainhattan Wheels	BMW M240i Racing Cup	651	(Germany) Sven Markert	6
(Germany) Adrenalin Motorsport Team Mainhattan Wheels	BMW M240i Racing Cup	651	(Germany) Andreas Winkler	7–10
(Germany) Adrenalin Motorsport Team Mainhattan Wheels	BMW M240i Racing Cup	651	(Germany) Lars Harbeck	7, 9–10
(Germany) Adrenalin Motorsport Team Mainhattan Wheels	BMW M240i Racing Cup	651	(Sweden) Siri Hökfelt	7, 10
(Germany) Adrenalin Motorsport Team Mainhattan Wheels	BMW M240i Racing Cup	651	(Germany) Sub7BTG	7
(Germany) Adrenalin Motorsport Team Mainhattan Wheels	BMW M240i Racing Cup	651	(Canada) Adam Tang	8-9
(Germany) Adrenalin Motorsport Team Mainhattan Wheels	BMW M240i Racing Cup	651	(Germany) Danny Brink	8
(Germany) Adrenalin Motorsport Team Mainhattan Wheels	BMW M240i Racing Cup	651	(Germany) Markus Bückle	8
(Germany) Adrenalin Motorsport Team Mainhattan Wheels	BMW M240i Racing Cup	652	(Romania) Aldrin Opran	1–3
(Germany) Adrenalin Motorsport Team Mainhattan Wheels	BMW M240i Racing Cup	652	(Netherlands) Mark van der Snel	1–2
(Germany) Adrenalin Motorsport Team Mainhattan Wheels	BMW M240i Racing Cup	652	(Argentina) Nano Lopez	1
(Germany) Adrenalin Motorsport Team Mainhattan Wheels	BMW M240i Racing Cup	652	(Netherlands) Max van der Snel	2
(Germany) Adrenalin Motorsport Team Mainhattan Wheels	BMW M240i Racing Cup	652	(Germany) Lars Harbeck	3–5, 10
(Germany) Adrenalin Motorsport Team Mainhattan Wheels	BMW M240i Racing Cup	652	(United Kingdom) Harry King	3
(Germany) Adrenalin Motorsport Team Mainhattan Wheels	BMW M240i Racing Cup	652	(France) Grégoire Boutonnet	4–5
(Germany) Adrenalin Motorsport Team Mainhattan Wheels	BMW M240i Racing Cup	652	(United Kingdom) Oleg Kravets	4–5
(Germany) Adrenalin Motorsport Team Mainhattan Wheels	BMW M240i Racing Cup	652	(France) Laurent Laparra	4–5
(Germany) Adrenalin Motorsport Team Mainhattan Wheels	BMW M240i Racing Cup	652	(Netherlands) Filip Hoenjet	6
(Germany) Adrenalin Motorsport Team Mainhattan Wheels	BMW M240i Racing Cup	652	(Germany) Markus Schiller	6
(Germany) Adrenalin Motorsport Team Mainhattan Wheels	BMW M240i Racing Cup	652	(Canada) Parker Thompson	6
(Germany) Adrenalin Motorsport Team Mainhattan Wheels	BMW M240i Racing Cup	652	(China) Lin Weixiong	7
(Germany) Adrenalin Motorsport Team Mainhattan Wheels	BMW M240i Racing Cup	652	(China) Yang Haoyu	7
(Germany) Adrenalin Motorsport Team Mainhattan Wheels	BMW M240i Racing Cup	652	(Brazil) Arthur Copstein	8–10
(Germany) Adrenalin Motorsport Team Mainhattan Wheels	BMW M240i Racing Cup	652	(Moldova) Serghei Ievlev	8
(Germany) Adrenalin Motorsport Team Mainhattan Wheels	BMW M240i Racing Cup	652	(Moldova) Evgenii Magidovich	8
(Germany) Adrenalin Motorsport Team Mainhattan Wheels	BMW M240i Racing Cup	652	(Sweden) Siri Hökfelt	9
(Germany) Adrenalin Motorsport Team Mainhattan Wheels	BMW M240i Racing Cup	652	(Germany) Danny Brink	9
(Germany) Adrenalin Motorsport Team Mainhattan Wheels	BMW M240i Racing Cup	652	(Germany) Markus Bückle	9
(Germany) Adrenalin Motorsport Team Mainhattan Wheels	BMW M240i Racing Cup	652	(Germany) Alexander Gotthardt	10
(Germany) Adrenalin Motorsport Team Mainhattan Wheels	BMW M240i Racing Cup	653	(United Kingdom) Farquini	1–2, 4–10
(Germany) Adrenalin Motorsport Team Mainhattan Wheels	BMW M240i Racing Cup	653	(United Kingdom) Ben Pitch	1–2, 4–7
(Germany) Adrenalin Motorsport Team Mainhattan Wheels	BMW M240i Racing Cup	653	(Belgium) Axel Soyez	3
(Germany) Adrenalin Motorsport Team Mainhattan Wheels	BMW M240i Racing Cup	653	(Germany) Alboretto	3
(Germany) Adrenalin Motorsport Team Mainhattan Wheels	BMW M240i Racing Cup	653	(Germany) Hermann Vortkamp	3
(Germany) Adrenalin Motorsport Team Mainhattan Wheels	BMW M240i Racing Cup	653	(United States) Chad Gilsinger	8
(Germany) Adrenalin Motorsport Team Mainhattan Wheels	BMW M240i Racing Cup	653	(United States) Ben Jacobs	8
(Germany) Adrenalin Motorsport Team Mainhattan Wheels	BMW M240i Racing Cup	653	(Argentina) Ignacio Montenegro	9
(Germany) Adrenalin Motorsport Team Mainhattan Wheels	BMW M240i Racing Cup	653	(France) Antoine Doquin	9
(Germany) Adrenalin Motorsport Team Mainhattan Wheels	BMW M240i Racing Cup	653	(Australia) Lachlan Evennett	10
(Belgium) JJ Motorsport	BMW M240i Racing Cup	658	(Belgium) Hakan Sari	2–5
(Belgium) JJ Motorsport	BMW M240i Racing Cup	658	(Belgium) Recep Sari	2–5
(Belgium) JJ Motorsport	BMW M240i Racing Cup	658	(Germany) Lars Harbeck	2
(Germany) Smyrlis Racing	BMW M240i Racing Cup	660	(Germany) Antoine Berberich Martini	6
(Germany) Smyrlis Racing	BMW M240i Racing Cup	660	(Germany) Denny Berndt	6
(Germany) SR Motorsport by Schnitzelalm	BMW M240i Racing Cup	661	(Germany) Cedric Fuchs	7–8
(Germany) SR Motorsport by Schnitzelalm	BMW M240i Racing Cup	661	(Germany) Tom Kalender	7
(Germany) SR Motorsport by Schnitzelalm	BMW M240i Racing Cup	661	(Germany) Lennard Falk von Canal	7
(Germany) SR Motorsport by Schnitzelalm	BMW M240i Racing Cup	661	(Germany) Enrico Förderer	7
(Germany) SR Motorsport by Schnitzelalm	BMW M240i Racing Cup	661	(India) Ravi Ramyead	8
(Germany) SR Motorsport by Schnitzelalm	BMW M240i Racing Cup	661	(Germany) Wilhelm Kühne	8
(Germany) SR Motorsport by Schnitzelalm	BMW M240i Racing Cup	661	(Germany) Timo Kieslich	8
(Germany) Team Motopark	BMW M240i Racing Cup	662	(United Kingdom) Christian Mansell	7
(Germany) Team Motopark	BMW M240i Racing Cup	662	(Netherlands) Remon Vos	7
(Germany) Team Motopark	BMW M240i Racing Cup	662	(Germany) Timo Rumpfkeil	7
(Germany) Team Motopark	BMW M240i Racing Cup	663	(United Kingdom) Christian Mansell	7
(Germany) Team Motopark	BMW M240i Racing Cup	663	(Netherlands) Remon Vos	7
(Germany) Team Motopark	BMW M240i Racing Cup	663	(Germany) Timo Rumpfkeil	7
(Germany) Ganser Motorsport / Schmickler Performance powered by Ravenol	BMW M240i Racing Cup	664	(Netherlands) Filip Hoenjet	1, 3–5, 7–10
(Germany) Ganser Motorsport / Schmickler Performance powered by Ravenol	BMW M240i Racing Cup	664	(Germany) Sarah Ganser	1, 3–5
(Germany) Ganser Motorsport / Schmickler Performance powered by Ravenol	BMW M240i Racing Cup	664	(Israel) Moran Gott	4–5, 7–10
(Germany) Ganser Motorsport / Schmickler Performance powered by Ravenol	BMW M240i Racing Cup	664	(Israel) Hagay Farran	4–5
(Singapore) Giti Tire Motorsport by WS Racing	BMW M240i Racing Cup	665	(Netherlands) John van der Sanden	1–7
(Singapore) Giti Tire Motorsport by WS Racing	BMW M240i Racing Cup	665	(Germany) Jan Ullrich	1–6, 8–10
(Singapore) Giti Tire Motorsport by WS Racing	BMW M240i Racing Cup	665	(Germany) Ulf Steffens	1–6
(Singapore) Giti Tire Motorsport by WS Racing	BMW M240i Racing Cup	665	(Australia) Bart Horsten	7, 9–10
(Singapore) Giti Tire Motorsport by WS Racing	BMW M240i Racing Cup	665	(United Kingdom) Matthew Higgens	7, 9
(Singapore) Giti Tire Motorsport by WS Racing	BMW M240i Racing Cup	665	(Germany) Fabian Pirrone	7
(Singapore) Giti Tire Motorsport by WS Racing	BMW M240i Racing Cup	665	(Romania) Fadi Rida	8
(Singapore) Giti Tire Motorsport by WS Racing	BMW M240i Racing Cup	665	(Romania) Tudor Tudurachi	8
(Singapore) Giti Tire Motorsport by WS Racing	BMW M240i Racing Cup	665	(Germany) Peter Terting	10
(Singapore) Giti Tire Motorsport by WS Racing	BMW M240i Racing Cup	670	(France) Nicolas Markiewicz	1, 3–5
(Singapore) Giti Tire Motorsport by WS Racing	BMW M240i Racing Cup	670	(France) Adrien Paviot	1, 3
(Singapore) Giti Tire Motorsport by WS Racing	BMW M240i Racing Cup	670	(France) Valentin Belgy	1, 4–5
(Singapore) Giti Tire Motorsport by WS Racing	BMW M240i Racing Cup	670	(Germany) Dennis Garbe	4–5
(Singapore) Giti Tire Motorsport by WS Racing	BMW M240i Racing Cup	680	(Sweden) Andreas Andersson	4–5
(Singapore) Giti Tire Motorsport by WS Racing	BMW M240i Racing Cup	680	(Sweden) Andreas Nilsson	4–5
(Singapore) Giti Tire Motorsport by WS Racing	BMW M240i Racing Cup	680	(Sweden) Johan Nilsson	4–5
	BMW M240i Racing Cup	666	(Germany) Bernd Kuepper	7
	BMW M240i Racing Cup	666	(Germany) Niklas Ehrhardt	7
	BMW M240i Racing Cup	666	(Germany) Günther Hartwig	7
	BMW M240i Racing Cup	666	(Germany) Stefan Stempel	10
	BMW M240i Racing Cup	666	(Germany) Julius Wiese	10
	BMW M240i Racing Cup	666	(Germany) Robert Neumann	10
(United Kingdom) Breakell Racing	BMW M240i Racing Cup	667	(Republic of Ireland) Aidan Mulready	1–3, 6–10
(United Kingdom) Breakell Racing	BMW M240i Racing Cup	667	(United Kingdom) Joshua Hislop	1–2, 6–7, 9–10
(United Kingdom) Breakell Racing	BMW M240i Racing Cup	667	(United Kingdom) James Breakell	1, 6, 8–9
(United Kingdom) Breakell Racing	BMW M240i Racing Cup	667	(United Kingdom) Karim Sekkat	2
(United Kingdom) Breakell Racing	BMW M240i Racing Cup	667	(Dominican Republic) Pedro Zaiter	3, 7
(United Kingdom) Breakell Racing	BMW M240i Racing Cup	667	(Switzerland) Andreas Simon	3, 8
(United Kingdom) Breakell Racing	BMW M240i Racing Cup	667	(United Kingdom) Adam Sharpe	7
(United Kingdom) Breakell Racing	BMW M240i Racing Cup	667	(United Kingdom) Tom Wheatley	10
(Germany) Keeevin Motorsport	BMW M240i Racing Cup	669	(Germany) Maximilian Kurz	2–3
(Germany) Keeevin Motorsport	BMW M240i Racing Cup	669	(Germany) Riccardo Petrolo	2–3
(Germany) Keeevin Motorsport	BMW M240i Racing Cup	669	(Germany) Loris Scheider	2
(Germany) Keeevin Motorsport	BMW M240i Racing Cup	669	(Turkey) Zeynel Babacan	3
(Germany) Up2Race	BMW M240i Racing Cup	670	(Italy) Riccardo Tucci	6, 8
(Germany) Up2Race	BMW M240i Racing Cup	670	(United Kingdom) Samuel Harrison	6
(Germany) Up2Race	BMW M240i Racing Cup	670	(Finland) Mika Panu	6
(Germany) Up2Race	BMW M240i Racing Cup	670	(Netherlands) John Van Der Sanden	8, 10
(Germany) Up2Race	BMW M240i Racing Cup	670	(Switzerland) Jean-Luc D'Auria	8
(Germany) Up2Race	BMW M240i Racing Cup	670	(Germany) Jannik Reinhard	10
(Germany) Up2Race	BMW M240i Racing Cup	670	(Germany) Ralf Brückmann	10
(Germany) Up2Race	BMW M240i Racing Cup	680	(Sweden) Evald Holstad	1–2
(Germany) Up2Race	BMW M240i Racing Cup	680	(Germany) Jannik Reinhard	2, 7
(Germany) Up2Race	BMW M240i Racing Cup	680	(United Kingdom) Jamie Green	2
(Germany) Up2Race	BMW M240i Racing Cup	680	(Germany) Ralf Bohn	6
(Germany) Up2Race	BMW M240i Racing Cup	680	(Germany) Alfred Renauer	6
(Germany) Up2Race	BMW M240i Racing Cup	680	(Germany) Jan Ullrich	6
(Germany) Up2Race	BMW M240i Racing Cup	680	(Germany) Alboretto	7
(Germany) Up2Race	BMW M240i Racing Cup	680	(Switzerland) Jean-Luc D'Auria	7
(Germany) asBest Racing	BMW M240i Racing Cup	677	(Switzerland) Marco Grilli	All
(Germany) asBest Racing	BMW M240i Racing Cup	677	(Switzerland) Thomas Alpiger	3–5
(Germany) asBest Racing	BMW M240i Racing Cup	677	(Switzerland) Michael Neuhauser	4–5
(Germany) asBest Racing	BMW M240i Racing Cup	677	(Germany) Sebastian Tauber	4–5
(Germany) asBest Racing	BMW M240i Racing Cup	677	(Germany) Tom Schütze	7
(Germany) asBest Racing	BMW M240i Racing Cup	677	(Germany) Sebastian Disch	7
(Germany) asBest Racing	BMW M240i Racing Cup	677	(Germany) Christian Andreas Franz	8–10
BMW M2 Racing
(Germany) Adrenalin Motorsport Team Mainhattan Wheels	BMW M2 CS Racing	870	(China) Foo Kuk Cheung	2
(Germany) Adrenalin Motorsport Team Mainhattan Wheels	BMW M2 CS Racing	870	(China) Zou Yunfeng	2, 4–5
(Germany) Adrenalin Motorsport Team Mainhattan Wheels	BMW M2 CS Racing	870	(United States) Robby Foley	3
(Germany) Adrenalin Motorsport Team Mainhattan Wheels	BMW M2 CS Racing	870	(United States) Francis Selldorf	3
(Germany) Adrenalin Motorsport Team Mainhattan Wheels	BMW M2 CS Racing	870	(China) Lin Weixiong	4–5
(Germany) Adrenalin Motorsport Team Mainhattan Wheels	BMW M2 CS Racing	870	(China) Yang Haoyu	4–5
(Germany) Adrenalin Motorsport Team Mainhattan Wheels	BMW M2 CS Racing	870	(Germany) Benjamin Albers	6–10
(Germany) Adrenalin Motorsport Team Mainhattan Wheels	BMW M2 CS Racing	870	(United States) Nico Silva	6–10
(Germany) Adrenalin Motorsport Team Mainhattan Wheels	BMW M2 CS Racing	870	(Argentina) Santiago Baztarrica	6–9
(Germany) Adrenalin Motorsport Team Mainhattan Wheels	BMW M2 CS Racing	870	(Germany) Philipp Stahlschmidt	10
(Germany) FK Performance Motorsport	BMW M2 CS Racing	871	(Bulgaria) Alex Stefanov	8
(Germany) FK Performance Motorsport	BMW M2 CS Racing	871	(Bulgaria) Dimitar Balev	8
(Germany) FK Performance Motorsport	BMW M2 CS Racing	871	(United Kingdom) Daniel Weston	8
(Germany) FK Performance Motorsport	BMW M2 CS Racing	871	(Poland) Robin Rogalski	8
(Germany) FK Performance Motorsport	BMW M2 CS Racing	875	(Germany) Fabio Rauer	7
(Germany) FK Performance Motorsport	BMW M2 CS Racing	875	(Finland) Benjamin Sylvestersson	7
(Germany) FK Performance Motorsport	BMW M2 CS Racing	875	(Bulgaria) Alex Stefanov	7
(Germany) Ravenol Motorsport	BMW M2 CS Racing	877	(Germany) Marc David Müller	1–3, 6–10
(Germany) Ravenol Motorsport	BMW M2 CS Racing	877	(Germany) Henrik Seibel	1, 3, 6–10
(Germany) Ravenol Motorsport	BMW M2 CS Racing	877	(Netherlands) Maxime Oosten	2
(Germany) SRS Team Sorg Rennsport	BMW M2 CS Racing	878	(Belgium) Tim Peeters	All
(Germany) SRS Team Sorg Rennsport	BMW M2 CS Racing	878	(Germany) Max Schlichenmeier	1–2, 6
(Germany) SRS Team Sorg Rennsport	BMW M2 CS Racing	878	(Germany) Tabea Jünger	1, 3–5, 10
(Germany) SRS Team Sorg Rennsport	BMW M2 CS Racing	878	(Germany) Maximilian Hill	2–10
(Germany) SRS Team Sorg Rennsport	BMW M2 CS Racing	878	(Germany) Aaron Wenisch	4–5
(Germany) SRS Team Sorg Rennsport	BMW M2 CS Racing	878	(United States) Johnny Huang	7
(Germany) SRS Team Sorg Rennsport	BMW M2 CS Racing	878	(Italy) Max Mutschlechner	7
(Germany) SRS Team Sorg Rennsport	BMW M2 CS Racing	878	(United States) Rafael Torres	8–9
(Germany) SRS Team Sorg Rennsport	BMW M2 CS Racing	899	(Germany) Daniel Alger	6–7
(Germany) SRS Team Sorg Rennsport	BMW M2 CS Racing	899	(Germany) Mathias Baar	6
(Germany) SRS Team Sorg Rennsport	BMW M2 CS Racing	899	(Italy) Sofia Necchi	6
(Germany) SRS Team Sorg Rennsport	BMW M2 CS Racing	899	(Netherlands) Olivier Olthof	6, 10
(Germany) SRS Team Sorg Rennsport	BMW M2 CS Racing	899	(Germany) Gina Jobes	6
(Germany) SRS Team Sorg Rennsport	BMW M2 CS Racing	899	(Italy) Andreas Mayrl	6
(Germany) SRS Team Sorg Rennsport	BMW M2 CS Racing	899	(Australia) Campbell Nunn	8–9
(Germany) SRS Team Sorg Rennsport	BMW M2 CS Racing	899	(Germany) Ole Scharp	8–9
(Germany) SRS Team Sorg Rennsport	BMW M2 CS Racing	899	(Australia) Joshua Rogers	8
(Germany) SRS Team Sorg Rennsport	BMW M2 CS Racing	899	(United Kingdom) Max Esterson	9–10
(Germany) SRS Team Sorg Rennsport	BMW M2 CS Racing	899	(Germany) Marcus Trotzenberg	10
(Germany) ME Motorsport	BMW M2 CS Racing	885	(Germany) Markus Eichele	7
(Germany) ME Motorsport	BMW M2 CS Racing	885	(Germany) Thomas Rackl	7
(Germany) ME Motorsport	BMW M2 CS Racing	885	(Germany) Linus Hahne	7
(Switzerland) Hofor Racing by Bonk Motorsport	BMW M2 CS Racing	888	(Switzerland) Ranko Mijatovic	All
(Switzerland) Hofor Racing by Bonk Motorsport	BMW M2 CS Racing	888	(Germany) Michael Schrey	1–5, 7
(Germany) Walkenhorst Motorsport	BMW M2 CS Racing	898	(Germany) Bennet Ehrl	1–2, 4–6, 8–9
(Germany) Walkenhorst Motorsport	BMW M2 CS Racing	898	(Norway) Emil Christian Gjerdrum	1
(Germany) Walkenhorst Motorsport	BMW M2 CS Racing	898	(Germany) Maxim Felix Dacher	2, 4–5, 8
(Germany) Walkenhorst Motorsport	BMW M2 CS Racing	898	(United States) Tazio Ottis	4–5
(Germany) Walkenhorst Motorsport	BMW M2 CS Racing	898	(Germany) Hermann Vortkamp	4–5
(Germany) Walkenhorst Motorsport	BMW M2 CS Racing	898	(Norway) Lars Erik Wogsted	6, 8–9
(Germany) Walkenhorst Motorsport	BMW M2 CS Racing	898	(Germany) Henry Walkenhorst	9
(Germany) Walkenhorst Motorsport	BMW M2 CS Racing	898	(United Kingdom) Daniel Weston	9
(Germany) W&S Motorsport	BMW M2 CS Racing	899	(Germany) Frank Anhorn	1–3
(Germany) W&S Motorsport	BMW M2 CS Racing	899	(Germany) Yanis Anhorn	1–2
(Germany) W&S Motorsport	BMW M2 CS Racing	899	(Luxembourg) Max Lamesch	3
(Germany) W&S Motorsport	BMW M2 CS Racing	899	(Luxembourg) John Marechal	3
BMW 325i Challenge
(Germany) EiFelkind Racing	BMW 325i	100	(Germany) Henning Hausmeier	All
(Germany) EiFelkind Racing	BMW 325i	100	(Austria) Michael Fischer	1–5
(Germany) EiFelkind Racing	BMW 325i	100	(Germany) Oliver Frisse	1–2, 4–10
(Germany) EiFelkind Racing	BMW 325i	100	(Austria) Markus Fischer	4–5
(Germany) EiFelkind Racing	BMW 325i	100	(Germany) Philipp Weber	7
(Germany) EiFelkind Racing	BMW 325i	100	(Germany) Moritz Thomas Rosenbach	8–10
(Germany) EiFelkind Racing	BMW 325i	101	(Germany) Sven Schulte	4–5
(Germany) EiFelkind Racing	BMW 325i	101	(Germany) Tim Schwolow	4–5
(Germany) EiFelkind Racing	BMW 325i	101	Vladimir Lobachev	4–5
(Germany) EiFelkind Racing	BMW 325i	101	(Germany) Heiko Weckenbrock	4–5
(Germany) EiFelkind Racing	BMW 325i	102	(Austria) Michael Fischer	1
(Germany) EiFelkind Racing	BMW 325i	102	(Germany) Nils Renkem	2, 7
(Germany) EiFelkind Racing	BMW 325i	102	(Germany) Max Rosam	2
(Germany) EiFelkind Racing	BMW 325i	102	(Germany) Tim Schwolow	6
(Germany) EiFelkind Racing	BMW 325i	102	(Austria) Maximilian Vogl	6
(Germany) EiFelkind Racing	BMW 325i	102	(United States) Thomas Pendergrass	7–9
(Germany) EiFelkind Racing	BMW 325i	102	(Germany) Sven Schulte	7
(Germany) EiFelkind Racing	BMW 325i	102	(Germany) Marc Ullrich	8–9
(Germany) EiFelkind Racing	BMW 325i	102	(Germany) Alexander Tauscher	8
(Germany) EiFelkind Racing	BMW 325i	102	(Germany) Michael Koch	9
(Germany) EiFelkind Racing	BMW 325i	102	(Germany) Luca Alpert	10
(Germany) EiFelkind Racing	BMW 325i	102	(Norway) Steffen Knutsen Hjelvik	10
(Germany) Spezzial Racing	BMW 325i	101	(Germany) Fritz Hebig	1–3, 6–8
(Germany) Spezzial Racing	BMW 325i	101	(Germany) Paul Pensler	1–3, 6–8
(Germany) asBest Racing	BMW 325i	108	(Germany) Bastian Beck	1
(Germany) asBest Racing	BMW 325i	108	(Germany) Anton Hahnenkamm	2
(Germany) asBest Racing	BMW 325i	108	(Germany) Michael Koch	2
(Germany) asBest Racing	BMW 325i	108	(Germany) Sascha Korte	2
(Germany) asBest Racing	BMW 325i	108	(Netherlands) Chris Rothoff	3
(Germany) asBest Racing	BMW 325i	108	(Germany) Roman Schiemenz	3
(Germany) asBest Racing	BMW 325i	108	(Germany) Andre Gehring	4–5
(Germany) asBest Racing	BMW 325i	108	(Germany) Robert Neumann	4–5
(Germany) asBest Racing	BMW 325i	108	(Germany) Jens Schneider	7
(Germany) asBest Racing	BMW 325i	108	(Germany) Robin Reimer	7
(Germany) asBest Racing	BMW 325i	108	(Germany) Zoran Radulovic	7
(Germany) asBest Racing	BMW 325i	108	(France) Nicolas Koenig	10
(Germany) asBest Racing	BMW 325i	108	(Germany) Pierre Humbert	10
(Germany) TEAM JSCompetition	BMW 325i	107	(Germany) Christian Koger	9–10
(Germany) TEAM JSCompetition	BMW 325i	107	(Germany) Alexander Müller	9
(Germany) TEAM JSCompetition	BMW 325i	107	(Germany) Jonas Spölgen	9
(Germany) TEAM JSCompetition	BMW 325i	107	(Germany) Alexander Euler	10
(Germany) TEAM JSCompetition	BMW 325i	107	(Austria) Eric Tobler	10
(Germany) TEAM JSCompetition	BMW 325i	111	(Germany) Eugen Becker	1–6
(Germany) TEAM JSCompetition	BMW 325i	111	(Germany) Jonas Spölgen	1–6
(Germany) TEAM JSCompetition	BMW 325i	112	(Germany) Jonas Spölgen	4–6, 8
(Germany) TEAM JSCompetition	BMW 325i	112	(Germany) Christian Geilfus	4–5
(Germany) TEAM JSCompetition	BMW 325i	112	(Switzerland) Kevin Ott	4–5
(Germany) TEAM JSCompetition	BMW 325i	112	(Switzerland) Flurin Zimmermann	4–5
(Germany) TEAM JSCompetition	BMW 325i	112	(Germany) Eugen Becker	6
(Germany) TEAM JSCompetition	BMW 325i	112	(Germany) Julia Ponkratz	6
(Germany) TEAM JSCompetition	BMW 325i	112	(Germany) Christian Koger	8
(Germany) rent2Drive-MEHRTEC-racing	BMW 325i	112	(United Kingdom) Sam Holman	2
(Germany) rent2Drive-MEHRTEC-racing	BMW 325i	112	(United Kingdom) Stuart McLaren	2
(Germany) rent2Drive-MEHRTEC-racing	BMW 325i	112	(Germany) Happinessa	2
(Germany) rent2Drive-MEHRTEC-racing	BMW 325i	115	(Germany) Jürgen Huber	1, 3
(Germany) rent2Drive-MEHRTEC-racing	BMW 325i	115	(Germany) Simon Sagmeister	1, 3
(Germany) rent2Drive-MEHRTEC-racing	BMW 325i	115	(United Kingdom) Sam Holman	8
(Germany) rent2Drive-MEHRTEC-racing	BMW 325i	115	(United Kingdom) Stuart McLaren	8
(Germany) rent2Drive-MEHRTEC-racing	BMW 325i	115	(United Kingdom) Thomas MacFarlane	8
(Germany) rent2Drive-MEHRTEC-racing	BMW 325i	115	(United Kingdom) Sean Connolly	8
	BMW 325i	120	(Germany) Dominik Schöning	7
	BMW 325i	120	(Germany) Roman Schiemenz	7
(Germany) Keeevin Motorsport	BMW 325i	121	(Sweden) Dan Berghult	1–4
(Germany) Keeevin Motorsport	BMW 325i	121	(Finland) Juha Miettinen	1–4
(Germany) Keeevin Motorsport	BMW 325i	122	(United Kingdom) Alex Wright	10
(Germany) Keeevin Motorsport	BMW 325i	122	(Germany) Jonathan Sharp	10
	BMW 325i	124	(Germany) Michael Wolpertinger	8
	BMW 325i	124	(Germany) Viktoria Bochen	8
	BMW 325i	124	(Germany) Tim Schlebusch	8
	BMW 325i Kombi	700	(Germany) Florian Altschaffel	7
	BMW 325i Kombi	700	(Germany) Jonas Krause	7
	BMW 325i Kombi	700	(Germany) Edouard Martin	7
Entry Lists:

==== Gruppe H historic cars ====
Team	Car	No.	Drivers	Rounds
H2
	Honda Civic Type R	611	(Germany) Mark Giesbrecht	7–8, 10
	Honda Civic Type R	611	(Germany) Frank Kuhlmann	7–8, 10
	Honda Civic Type R	611	(Germany) Michael Flehmer	7
H4
Entry Lists:

== Results ==
Rnd.	Race	Pole position	Overall winners	Report
NLS1	71. ADAC Westfalenfahrt	Cancelled due to the weather conditions		
NLS2	58. ADAC Barbarossapreis	(Netherlands) No. 3 Mercedes-AMG Team Verstappen Racing	(Germany) No. 99 Rowe Racing	
NLS2	58. ADAC Barbarossapreis	Max Verstappen; Jules Gounon; Daniel Juncadella	Dan Harper; Jordan Pepper	
NLS3	57. Adenauer ADAC Rundstrecken-Trophy	(Hong Kong) No. 47 KCMG	(Germany) No. 77 Schubert Motorsport	
NLS3	57. Adenauer ADAC Rundstrecken-Trophy	(Japan) Kamui Kobayashi (Finland) Jesse Krohn (Italy) Edoardo Liberati (United Kingdom) David Pittard	(Austria) Philipp Eng (Netherlands) Robin Frijns (Germany) Marco Wittmann	
24H-Q1	ADAC 24h Nürburgring Qualifiers Rennen 1	Race abandoned due to driver death		
24H-Q2	ADAC 24h Nürburgring Qualifiers Rennen 2	(Japan) No. 45 Realize Kondo Racing with Rinaldi	(Germany) No. 16 Scherer Sport PHX	
24H-Q2	ADAC 24h Nürburgring Qualifiers Rennen 2	(Germany) Dennis Marschall; David Perel; Thierry Vermeulen	(United Kingdom) Ben Green (Germany) Christopher Haase (United Kingdom) Alexander Sims	
NLS6	1. ADAC Eifel Trophy	(Germany) No. 35 Walkenhorst Motorsport	(Germany) No. 17 Dunlop Motorsports	
NLS6	1. ADAC Eifel Trophy	(Norway) Christian Krognes (Ecuador) Mateo Villagomez	(Germany) Nico Menzel (Germany) Sven Müller	
NLS7	KW 6h ADAC Ruhr-Pokal-Rennen	(Germany) No. 80 Mercedes-AMG Team Ravenol	(Germany) No. 80 Mercedes-AMG Team Ravenol	
NLS7	KW 6h ADAC Ruhr-Pokal-Rennen	(Estonia) Ralf Aron (Germany) Luca Stolz	(Estonia) Ralf Aron (Germany) Luca Stolz	
NLS8	65. ADAC Reinoldus-Langstreckenrennen	(Slovakia) No. 23 Gamota Racing	(Germany) No. 77 Schubert Motorsport	
NLS8	65. ADAC Reinoldus-Langstreckenrennen	(Germany) David Jahn (Germany) Moritz Kranz (Slovakia) Antal Zsigó	(Germany) Jens Klingmann (South Africa) Jordan Pepper (Belgium) Ugo de Wilde	
NLS9	66. ADAC ACAS Cup	(Germany) No. 44 Falken Motorsports	(Germany) No. 44 Falken Motorsports	
NLS9	66. ADAC ACAS Cup	(Germany) Tim Heinemann (Netherlands) Morris Schuring	(Germany) Tim Heinemann (Netherlands) Morris Schuring	
NLS10	2. NLS Sportwarte-Rennen	(Slovakia) No. 23 Gamota Racing	(Germany) No. 17 Dunlop Motorsports	
NLS10	2. NLS Sportwarte-Rennen	(Germany) David Jahn (Germany) Moritz Kranz (Slovakia) Antal Zsigó	(Germany) Nico Menzel (Germany) Sven Müller	

== Championship standings ==
=== Points system ===
==== Drivers ====
For drivers classification, points are awarded based on race duration, position in class, and number of starters in class. At the end of the season, the best 8 (eight) races will count for the championship and the rest will be dropped; however, disqualifications or race bans cannot be dropped.

In case of a driver entering for multiple cars in a race, they should nominate which car should they score points from; otherwise they automatically score from the car with the lowest start number.

4-hour race

Position in class	Starter cars in class						
Position in class	1	2	3	4	5	6	7+
1st	2	3	4	6	8	11	15
2nd	-	2	3	4	6	8	11
3rd	-	-	2	3	4	6	8
4th	-	-	-	2	3	4	6
5th	-	-	-	-	2	3	4
6th	-	-	-	-	-	2	3
7th	-	-	-	-	-	-	2
8th and below	-	-	-	-	-	-	1

6-hour race

Position in class	Starter cars in class						
Position in class	1	2	3	4	5	6	7+
1st	3	4	5	8	10	14	19
2nd	-	3	4	5	8	10	14
3rd	-	-	3	4	5	8	10
4th	-	-	-	3	4	5	8
5th	-	-	-	-	3	4	5
6th	-	-	-	-	-	3	4
7th	-	-	-	-	-	-	3
8th and below	-	-	-	-	-	-	1

==== Teams ====
For teams championships, points are awarded by finishing position. Also, for NLS Speed-Trophäe (overall teams) classification only, bonus points are awarded for top 3 in qualifying.

Position	1st	2nd	3rd	4th	5th	6th	7th	8th	9th	10th	11th	12th	13th	14th	15th	16th	17th	18th	19th	20th
Qualifying	3	2	1																	
Race	35	28	25	22	20	18	16	14	12	11	10	9	8	7	6	5	4	3	2	1

==== Porsche Endurance Trophy Nürburgring ====
Classes CUP2 and CUP3 are part of Porsche Endurance Trophy Nürburgring and have their own points system. The 24h Nürburgring Qualifier Races do not count towards these classes' classifications.

Position	1st	2nd	3rd	4th	5th	6th	7th	8th	9th	10th	11th	12th	13th	14th	15th	Pole	FL
4 hours	20	17	15	13	11	10	9	8	7	6	5	4	3	2	1	1	1
6 hours	30	25.5	22.5	19.5	16.5	15	13.5	12	10.5	9	7.5	6	4.5	3	1.5	1	1

=== Legends ===
Colour	Result
Gold	Winner
Silver	Second place
Bronze	Third place
Green	Points classification
Blue	Non-points classification
Blue	Non-classified finish (NC)
Purple	Retired, not classified (Ret)
Red	Did not qualify (DNQ)
Red	Did not pre-qualify (DNPQ)
Black	Disqualified (DSQ)
White	Did not start (DNS)
White	Withdrew (WD)
White	Race cancelled (C)
Blank	Did not practice (DNP)
Blank	Did not arrive (DNA)
Blank	Excluded (EX)

Icon	Class
J	Junior-Trophäe
L	Ladies-Trophäe
G	Gentleman-Trophäe

‡ — Result not counted for classification

^{1 2 3} — Points-paying position in qualifying

_{15-1} — Points won (drivers' classifications)

=== Drivers' Classifications ===
==== Gesamtwertung (Overall) ====
Pos.	Driver	Team	Class	NLS1	NLS2	NLS3	24H-Q		NLS6	NLS7	NLS8	NLS9	NLS10	Points
1	(Italy) Edoardo Bugane (Germany) Sven Markert	(Germany) #650 Adrenalin Motorsport Team Mainhattan Wheels	BMW M240i	C	1_{15}	1_{15}	C	1_{15}		1_{19}				79
1	(Italy) Edoardo Bugane (Germany) Sven Markert	(Germany) #651 Adrenalin Motorsport Team Mainhattan Wheels	BMW M240i						1_{15}					79
1	(Germany) Yannick Fübrich	(Germany) #650 Adrenalin Motorsport Team Mainhattan Wheels	BMW M240i		1_{15}	1_{15}	C	1_{15}		1_{19}				79
1	(Germany) Yannick Fübrich	(Germany) #651 Adrenalin Motorsport Team Mainhattan Wheels	BMW M240i						1_{15}					79
4	(Germany) Alexander Fielenbach	(Germany) #952 Smyrlis Racing	CUP3	C										64
4	(Germany) Alexander Fielenbach	(Germany) #953 Smyrlis Racing	CUP3		1_{15}	1_{15}	C	1_{15}	Ret	1_{19}				64
4	(Norway) Oskar Sandberg	(Germany) #910 Smyrlis Racing	CUP2	C										64
4	(Norway) Oskar Sandberg	(Germany) #953 Smyrlis Racing	CUP3		1_{15}	1_{15}	C	1_{15}	Ret	1_{19}				64
6	(Germany) Anton Abée (Germany) Yannik Himmels (Germany) Jörg Viebahn G	(Germany) #176 PROsport-Racing	SP10	C	1_{15}	3_{8}	C	3_{8}	1_{11}	2_{14}				56
9	(Austria) Raphael Rennhofer J	(Germany) #902 Team Liqui Moly by Black Falcon	CUP2	C	1_{15}	Ret			2_{11}	2_{14}				55
9	(Austria) Raphael Rennhofer J	(Germany) #920 Black Falcon	CUP2				C	1_{15}						55
9	(Germany) Benjamin Albers	(Germany) #650 Adrenalin Motorsport Team Mainhattan Wheels	BMW M240i				C	1_{15}						55
9	(Germany) Benjamin Albers	(Germany) #651 Adrenalin Motorsport Team Mainhattan Wheels	BMW M240i	C	2_{11}	2_{11}	C	Ret						55
9	(Germany) Benjamin Albers	(Germany) #870 Adrenalin Motorsport Team Mainhattan Wheels	BMW M2						2_{8}	3_{10}				55
11	(Romania) Alexandru Vasilescu G	(Germany) #177 AV Racing by Black Falcon	SP10	C	2_{11}	1_{15}	C	6_{3}	3_{6}	1_{19}				54
12	(Switzerland) Patrik Grütter	(Germany) #901 SRS Team Sorg Rennsport	CUP2	C	5_{4}	1_{15}			3_{8}	3_{10}				48
12	(Switzerland) Patrik Grütter	(Germany) #959 SRS Team Sorg Rennsport	CUP3				C	2_{11}						48
13	(Switzerland) Ranko Mijatovic	(Switzerland) #888 Hofor Racing by Bonk Motorsport	BMW M2	C	1_{11}	1_{8}	C	1_{6}	5_{3}	1_{19}				47
14	(United States) David Ogburn	(Germany) #177 AV Racing by Black Falcon	SP10	C		1_{15}				1_{19}				46
14	(United States) David Ogburn	(Germany) #180 AV Racing by Black Falcon	SP10		4_{6}		C	4_{6}						46
15	(Germany) Daniel Zils	(Germany) #396 Adrenalin Motorsport Team Mainhattan Wheels	V6	C	Ret	Ret			1_{4}‡	1_{4}‡				45
15	(Germany) Daniel Zils	(Germany) #500 Adrenalin Motorsport Team Mainhattan Wheels	VT2-RWD	C	Ret	2_{11}	C	1_{15}	Ret	1_{19}				45
15	(Germany) Philipp Leisen (Germany) Philipp Stahlschmidt	(Germany) #500 Adrenalin Motorsport Team Mainhattan Wheels	VT2-RWD	C	Ret	2_{11}	C	1_{15}	Ret	1_{19}				45
15	(Netherlands) Piet-Jan Ooms (Italy) Ionuc Catalin Timis	(Germany) #524 SRS Team Sorg Rennsport	VT2-RWD	C	1_{15}	1_{15}	C	Ret	1_{15}	Ret				45
15	(Germany) Tim Lukas Müller J	(Germany) #650 Adrenalin Motorsport Team Mainhattan Wheels	BMW M240i		1_{15}	1_{15}								45
15	(Germany) Tim Lukas Müller J	(Germany) #651 Adrenalin Motorsport Team Mainhattan Wheels	BMW M240i				C	Ret	1_{15}					45
21	(United States) Charles Russell Turner G	(Germany) #177 AV Racing by Black Falcon	SP10		2_{11}		C	6_{3}		1_{19}				44
21	(United States) Charles Russell Turner G	(Germany) #180 AV Racing by Black Falcon	SP10	C		2_{11}								44
21	(Germany) Michael Schrey	(Switzerland) #188 Hofor Racing by Bonk Motorsport	SP10				C	2_{11}‡						44
21	(Germany) Michael Schrey	(Switzerland) #888 Hofor Racing by Bonk Motorsport	BMW M2	C	1_{11}	1_{8}	C	1_{6}		1_{19}				44
23	(Germany) Patrick Assenheimer (Germany) Tobias Müller (Luxembourg) Dylan Pereira	(Germany) #48 48LOSCH Motorsport by Black Falcon	SP9 Pro-Am	C	1_{15}		C	Ret	1_{8}	1_{19}				42
26	(Germany) Marcel Unland (Germany) Markus Weinstock	(Germany) #470 Jung Motorsport	VT2-F+4WD	C	1_{15}	2_{11}	C	Ret	1_{15}	Ret				41
26	(Germany) Michael Eichhorn G	(Germany) #470 Jung Motorsport	VT2-F+4WD	C	1_{15}	2_{11}	C	Ret	1_{15}	Ret				41
26	(Germany) Michael Eichhorn G	(Germany) #472 Jung Motorsport	VT2-F+4WD							3_{10}‡				41
26	(Germany) Tobias Jung	(Germany) #470 Jung Motorsport	VT2-F+4WD	C	1_{15}	2_{11}	C	Ret	1_{15}	Ret				41
26	(Germany) Tobias Jung	(Germany) #472 Jung Motorsport	VT2-F+4WD	C	4_{6}‡	3_{8}‡				3_{10}‡				41
30	(United States) Malcolm Harrison J	(Germany) #177 AV Racing by Black Falcon	SP10	C		1_{15}			3_{6}	1_{19}				40
30	(United States) Ryan Harrison J (Germany) Leon Wassertheurer J	(Germany) #902 Team Liqui Moly by Black Falcon	CUP2	C	1_{15}	Ret			2_{11}	2_{14}				40
30	(Turkey) Mustafa-Mehmet Kaya (Germany) Mike Stursberg G	(Germany) #5 Black Falcon Team EAE	SP9 Am		1_{6}	1_{6}	C	1_{6}	2_{8}	2_{14}				40
30	(Argentina) Santiago Baztarrica J (United States) Nico Silva	(Germany) #651 Adrenalin Motorsport Team Mainhattan Wheels	BMW M240i	C	2_{11}	2_{11}	C	Ret						40
30	(Argentina) Santiago Baztarrica J (United States) Nico Silva	(Germany) #870 Adrenalin Motorsport Team Mainhattan Wheels	BMW M2						2_{8}	3_{10}				40
37	(Germany) Marc David Müller	(Germany) #877 Ravenol Motorsport	BMW M2	C	2_{8}	2_{6}			1_{11}	2_{14}				39
38	(Germany) Alexander Hardt (Chile) Benjamín Hites (Germany) Benjamin Koslowski J	(Germany) #900 Black Falcon Team Zimmermann	CUP2	C	4_{6}	2_{11}			8_{1}	1_{19}				37
38	(Germany) Moritz Oberheim (Germany) Lorenz Stegmann J	(Germany) #962 W&S Motorsport	CUP3	C	Ret	3_{8}			1_{15}	2_{14}				37
38	(Germany) Heiko Eichenberg G	(Germany) #959 SRS Team Sorg Rennsport	CUP3	C	2_{11}	2_{11}	C	2_{11}	Ret	6_{4}				37
Pos.	Driver	Team	Class	NLS1	NLS2	NLS3	24H-Q		NLS6	NLS7	NLS8	NLS9	NLS10	Points

Gesamtwertung - Position 44th and below
Pos.	Driver	Team	Class	NLS1	NLS2	NLS3	24H-Q		NLS6	NLS7	NLS8	NLS9	NLS10	Points
44	(Germany) Christoph Dupré (Germany) Joachim Nett G (Germany) Jürgen Nett G	(Germany) #480 Dupré Engineering	VT2-F+4WD	C	Ret	Ret	C	1_{15}	Ret	1_{19}				34
44	(Thailand) Kiki Sak Nana G	(Thailand) #786 Renazzo Motorsport	SP9 Am	C	Ret	2_{4}			1_{11}	1_{19}				34
44	(Germany) Christoph Breuer	(Thailand) #786 Renazzo Motorsport	SP9 Am	C	Ret	2_{4}			1_{11}	1_{19}				34
44	(Germany) Christoph Breuer	(Germany) #911 Manthey Racing EMA	SP9 Pro				C	WD						34
44	(Japan) Takuma Miyazono	(Germany) #520 Toyo Tires with Ring Racing	VT2-RWD	C	8_{1}	5_{4}	C	5_{4}	2_{11}	2_{14}				34
50	(Brazil) Flavia Pellegrino Fernandes L (Germany) Thomas Schönfeld	(Germany) #494 FS Motorsport	VT2-F+4WD	C	2_{11}	Ret	C	3_{8}	NC	2_{14}				33
52	(Germany) Paul Pensler J	(Germany) #101 Spezzial Racing	BMW 325i	C	1_{11}	Ret			2_{6}	1_{14}				31
52	(Germany) Henrik Seibel J	(Germany) #877 Ravenol Motorsport	BMW M2	C		2_{6}			1_{11}	2_{14}				31
54	(Germany) Oliver Frisse (Germany) Henning Hausmeier	(Germany) #100 EiFelkind Racing	BMW 325i	C	Ret	2_{8}	C	1_{6}	1_{8}	3_{8}				30
54	(Germany) David Jahn (Germany) Moritz Kranz (Slovakia) Antal Zsigó	(Slovakia) #23 Gamota Racing	SP9 Pro-Am	C	3_{8}	1_{6}	C	3_{8}	3_{4}	6_{4}				30
59	(Israel) Moran Gott	(Germany) #55 Schmickler Performance powered by Ravenol	VT2-RWD	C	2_{11}	4_{6}	C	2_{11}	Ret	Ret				28 (42)
59	(Israel) Moran Gott	(Germany) #664 Ganser Motorsport	BMW M240i				C	NC‡		2_{14}‡				28 (42)
59	(Israel) Hagay Farran	(Germany) #55 Schmickler Performance powered by Ravenol	VT2-RWD	C	2_{11}	4_{6}	C	2_{11}	Ret	Ret				28
59	(Israel) Hagay Farran	(Germany) #664 Ganser Motorsport	BMW M240i				C	4_{6}‡						28
61	(France) Joshua Bednarski	(Germany) #145 Cerny Motorsport	SP10				C	5_{4}‡						27
61	(France) Joshua Bednarski	(Belgium) #904 Mühlner Motorsport	CUP2				C	2_{11}		4_{8}				27
61	(France) Joshua Bednarski	(Belgium) #921 Mühlner Motorsport	CUP2	C	3_{8}	Ret								27
62	(Germany) Michael Bohrer (Germany) Pascal Otto Fritzsche	(Germany) #495 FS Motorsport	VT2-F+4WD	C	Ret	1_{15}	C	2_{11}	Ret	Ret				26
62	(Netherlands) Calvin de Groot J	(Germany) #488 SRS Team Sorg Rennsport	VT2-F+4WD				C	Ret						26
62	(Netherlands) Calvin de Groot J	(Germany) #959 SRS Team Sorg Rennsport	CUP3	C	2_{11}	2_{11}			Ret	6_{4}				26
65	(United States) Judson Holt G (United States) Denny Stripling G	(Germany) #180 AV Racing by Black Falcon	SP10	C	4_{6}	2_{11}	C	4_{6}						23
67	(Germany) Leonard Oehme (Germany) Moritz Oehme J	(Germany) #944 9und11 Racing	CUP3	C	5_{4}	5_{4}			2_{11}	7_{3}				22
67	(United Kingdom) Toby Goodman J (Czech Republic) Michal Makes (Germany) Marius Rauer	(Germany) #961 W&S Motorsport	CUP3	C	4_{6}	4_{6}			Ret	3_{10}				22
67	(Germany) Robin Chrzanowski (Germany) Kersten Jodexnis G (Germany) Richard-Sven Karl Jodexnis	(Germany) #919 Team Clickvers.de	CUP2	C	7_{2}	6_{3}	C	4_{6}	4_{6}	5_{5}				22
75	(Germany) Andreas Gülden (Germany) Tim Sandtler	(Germany) #32 Toyo Tires with Ring Racing	SP9 Pro-Am	C	4_{6}	3_{3}	C	DNS	4_{3}	4_{8}				20
75	(Japan) Yuichi Nakayama	(Germany) #32 Toyo Tires with Ring Racing	SP9 Pro-Am	C	4_{6}	3_{3}	C	DNS	4_{3}	4_{8}				20
75	(Japan) Yuichi Nakayama	(Germany) #170 Toyo Tires with Ring Racing	SP10	C										20
78	(Belgium) Guido Dumarey G	(Germany) #37 PROsport-Racing	SP9 Am	C	3_{3}	3_{3}	C	4_{2}	3_{6}	5_{5}				19
78	(Switzerland) Martin Kroll G	(Switzerland) #189 Hofor Racing by Bonk Motorsport	SP10	C	5_{4}	4_{6}	C	7_{2}	4_{4}	7_{3}				19
80	(Armenia) Artur Goroyan	(Armenia) #4 Goroyan RT by Car Collection	SP9 Pro-Am	C		2_{4}	C	Ret		2_{14}				18
80	(Germany) Maximilian Simons	(Germany) #472 Jung Motorsport	VT2-F+4WD	C	4_{6}	3_{8}	C	5_{4}	Ret					18
82	(Ecuador) Mateo Villagomez J	(Germany) #35 Walkenhorst Motorsport	SP9 Pro						3_{6}					17
82	(Ecuador) Mateo Villagomez J	(Germany) #35 Walkenhorst Motorsport	SP9 Pro-Am	C	2_{11}		C	DNS						17
82	(Germany) Horst Baumann G	(Germany) #950 Schmickler Performance powered by Ravenol	CUP3	C	3_{8}	Ret			10_{1}	4_{8}				17
82	(Belgium) Maxime Dumarey	(Germany) #27 PROsport-Racing	SP9 Am				C	DNS						17 (19)
82	(Belgium) Maxime Dumarey	(Germany) #37 PROsport-Racing	SP9 Am	C	3_{3}	3_{3}	C	4_{2}‡	3_{6}	5_{5}				17 (19)
82	(Netherlands) Misha Charoudin	(Germany) #300 Ollis Garage Racing	SP3T						3_{6}					17
82	(Netherlands) Misha Charoudin	(Germany) #632 Black Falcon Team Fanatec	AT 2	C	1_{2}	1_{3}	C	1_{3}		1_{3}				17
86	(Germany) Tim Scheerbarth	(Belgium) #904 Mühlner Motorsport	CUP2							4_{8}				16
86	(Germany) Tim Scheerbarth	(Belgium) #921 Mühlner Motorsport	CUP2	C	3_{8}	Ret			Ret					16
86	(Germany) Alexey Veremenko (Germany) "Selv"	(Lithuania) #8 Juta Racing	SP9 Pro-Am						Ret					16
86	(Germany) Alexey Veremenko (Germany) "Selv"	(Lithuania) #8 Juta Racing	SP9 Am	C	2_{4}		C	2_{4}		4_{8}				16
86	(Germany) Maximilian Hill	(Germany) #878 SRS Team Sorg Rennsport	BMW M2		5_{3}	4_{3}	C	2_{4}	3_{6}	NC				16 (17)
86	(Germany) Maximilian Hill	(Germany) #915 SRS Team Sorg Rennsport	CUP2							9_{1}‡				16 (17)
90	(Germany) Dieter Schmidtmann	(Thailand) #786 Renazzo Motorsport	SP9 Am	C	Ret	2_{4}			1_{11}					15
90	(Germany) Peter Sander	(Germany) #909 Kkrämer Racing	CUP2	C	6_{3}	Ret	C	3_{8}	5_{4}	Ret				15
90	(Germany) Ralf Wiesner G	(Germany) #491 STENLE Marketing by Mertens Motorsport	VT2-F+4WD	C	Ret	Ret	C	6_{3}	3_{8}	6_{4}				15
93	(Republic of Ireland) Aidan Mulready	(United Kingdom) #667 Breakell Racing	BMW M240i	C	9_{1}	7_{2}			2_{11}	Ret				14
93	(Netherlands) Mark van der Snel G	(Germany) #652 Adrenalin Motorsport Team Mainhattan Wheels	BMW M240i	C	4_{6}									14
93	(Netherlands) Mark van der Snel G	(Germany) #941 Adrenalin Motorsport Team Mainhattan Wheels	CUP3				C	3_{8}						14
93	(Germany) Danny Brink	#188 (Audi R8 LMS GT4 Evo)	SP10			9_{1}								14
93	(Germany) Danny Brink	(Germany) #322 Sharky Racing	SP3T	C	2_{4}									14
93	(Germany) Danny Brink	(Germany) #808 asBest Racing	SP3T						2_{8}					14
93	(Germany) Danny Brink	(Belgium) #999 Mühlner Motorsport	CUP3							13_{1}				14
93	(Germany) Matthias Beckwermert (Germany) Philip Klinkmüller	(Germany) #447 tm-racing.org	V5	C	3_{3}	2_{3}			1_{3}	1_{5}				14
93	(Germany) Matthias Beckwermert (Germany) Philip Klinkmüller	(Germany) #448 tm-racing.org	V5				C	DNS						14
98	(Germany) Fidel Leib	(Germany) #2 Team Joos Sportwagentechnik	SP9 Am							3_{10}				13 (14)
98	(Germany) Fidel Leib	(Germany) #33 Kkrämer Racing	SP9 Pro-Am	C	Ret	DNS	C	6_{3}						13 (14)
98	(Germany) Fidel Leib	(Germany) #33 Kkrämer Racing	SP9 Am						Ret					13 (14)
98	(Germany) Fidel Leib	(Germany) #952 Smyrlis Racing	CUP3						9_{1}‡					13 (14)
98	(Germany) Oliver Kriese G	(Germany) #300 Ollis Garage Racing	SP3T	C	3_{3}	5_{2}	C	3_{2}	3_{6}					13
98	(Germany) Oliver Kriese G	#481 (Renault Mégane RS)	VT2-F+4WD			Ret								13
100	(Germany) Jonas Spölgen	(Germany) #111 TEAM JSCompetition	BMW 325i	C	2_{8}	Ret	C	DNS	Ret					12
100	(Germany) Jonas Spölgen	(Germany) #112 TEAM JSCompetition	BMW 325i				C	2_{4}	Ret					12
100	(Germany) Daniel Korn (Germany) Tobias Korn (Germany) Ulrich Korn G	(Germany) #444 Adrenalin Motorsport Team Mainhattan Wheels	V5	C	1_{6}	1_{4}	C	1_{2}	Ret	Ret				12
100	(Belgium) Tim Peeters	(Germany) #878 SRS Team Sorg Rennsport	BMW M2	C	5_{3}	4_{3}	C	NC	3_{6}	NC				12
100	(Germany) Ralf-Peter Bonk G	(Germany) #906 pb performance	CUP2		11_{1}	9_{1}	C	5_{4}	6_{3}	7_{3}				12
100	(Germany) Ralf-Peter Bonk G	(Germany) #913 Team Cameron	CUP2	C	9_{1}‡									12
106	(Sweden) Dan Berghult G	(Germany) #121 Keeevin Motorsport	BMW 325i	C	Ret	1_{11}	C	WD						11
106	(Finland) Juha Miettinen G	(Germany) #121 Keeevin Motorsport	BMW 325i	C	Ret	1_{11}	C^{†}							11
106	(Germany) Dennis Fetzer J	(Germany) #35 Walkenhorst Motorsport	SP9 Pro							NC				11
106	(Germany) Dennis Fetzer J	(Germany) #35 Walkenhorst Motorsport	SP9 Pro-Am	C	2_{11}									11
106	(Germany) Adrian Rziczny J	(Germany) #941 Adrenalin Motorsport Team Mainhattan Wheels	CUP3	C	10_{1}	Ret	C	3_{8}	7_{2}	Ret				11
106	(United Kingdom) Jimmy Broadbent (United Kingdom) Steve Alvarez Brown	(Germany) #632 Black Falcon Team Fanatec	AT 2	C	1_{2}	1_{3}	C	1_{3}		1_{3}				11
106	(Germany) Manuel Metzger	(Germany) #632 Black Falcon Team Fanatec	AT 2		1_{2}	1_{3}	C	1_{3}		1_{3}				11
106	(Germany) Manuel Metzger	(Germany) #920 AV Racing by Black Falcon	CUP2							6^{4}‡				11
113	(Germany) Nick Deißler J	(Germany) #488 SRS Team Sorg Rennsport	VT2-F+4WD	C	3_{8}‡	4_{6}	C	Ret						10 (18)
113	(Germany) Nick Deißler J	(Germany) #949 SRS Team Sorg Rennsport	CUP3						6_{3}	8_{1}				10 (18)
113	(Germany) Christian Büllesbach (Germany) Klaus Faßbender G (Germany) Andreas Schettler G	(Germany) #396 Adrenalin Motorsport Team Mainhattan Wheels	V6	C	Ret	Ret	C	2_{2}	1_{4}	1_{4}				10
113	(Germany) Bennet Ehrl J	(Germany) #898 Walkenhorst Motorsport	BMW M2	C	4_{4}		C	4_{2}	4_{4}					10
113	(Germany) Michael Heimrich G (Germany) Arno Klasen G	(Germany) #50 équipe vitesse	SP9 Am				C	3_{3}	5_{3}	6_{4}				10
113	(Germany) Karsten Krämer	(Germany) #33 Kkrämer Racing	SP9 Pro-Am				C	6_{3}						10 (15)
113	(Germany) Karsten Krämer	(Germany) #909 Kkrämer Racing	CUP2	C	6_{3}	Ret	C	3_{8}‡	5_{4}	Ret				10 (15)
113	(Germany) Karsten Krämer	(Germany) #978 Kkrämer Racing	CUP3	C										10 (15)
121	(Germany) Rudi Speich G	(Germany) #59 MSC Sinzig e.V. im ADAC	VT3							1_{3}				9
121	(Germany) Rudi Speich G	(Germany) #317 2R Racing	SP3T			2_{6}								9
121	(Germany) Constantin Laube J (Germany) Henry Lindloff J	(Germany) #951 Smyrlis Racing	CUP3	C	14_{1}	16_{1}			4_{6}	15_{1}				9
121	(Germany) Stephan Brodmerkel G	(Germany) #164 W&S Motorsport	SP10	C	7_{2}	7_{2}			Ret	5_{5}				9
125	(Germany) Eugen Becker	(Germany) #111 TEAM JSCompetition	BMW 325i	C	2_{8}	Ret	C	DNS	Ret					8
125	(Germany) Eugen Becker	(Germany) #112 TEAM JSCompetition	BMW 325i						Ret					8
125	(Germany) Maik Rönnefarth	(Germany) #27 PROsport-Racing	SP9 Am				C	DNS						8
125	(Germany) Maik Rönnefarth	(Germany) #155 Plusline Motorsport	SP10	C	3_{8}		C	WD	Ret					8
125	(Germany) Alex Koch (Germany) Niklas Koch J	(Germany) #910 Smyrlis Racing	CUP2	C	8_{1}	4_{6}			9_{1}	Ret				8
125	(Germany) Klaus Koch G	(Germany) #910 Smyrlis Racing	CUP2		8_{1}	4_{6}			9_{1}	Ret				8
125	(Germany) Klaus Koch G	(Germany) #953 Smyrlis Racing	CUP3	C										8
125	(Germany) Max Rosam J	(Germany) #102 EiFelkind Racing	BMW 325i		Ret									8
125	(Germany) Max Rosam J	(Germany) #951 Smyrlis Racing	CUP3			16_{1}			4_{6}	15_{1}				8
131	(Germany) Jürgen Vöhringer G	(Germany) #164 W&S Motorsport	SP10	C	7_{2}				Ret	5_{5}				7
131	(Netherlands) Jan Jaap van Roon	(Germany) #19 Max Kruse Racing	AT 1		1_{3}	Ret				2_{4}				7
131	(Germany) Richard Schäfer	(Germany) #491 STENLE Marketing by Mertens Motorsport	VT2-F+4WD	C	Ret	Ret	C	6_{3}		6_{4}				7
131	(Germany) Richard Schäfer	(Germany) #492 STENLE Marketing by Mertens Motorsport						Ret						7
134	(Norway) Håkon Schjærin G	(Norway) #801 Møller Bil Motorsport	TCR		NC	1_{4}			1_{2}					6
134	(Germany) Darian Donkel J	(Germany) #949 SRS Team Sorg Rennsport	CUP3	C	7_{2}	Ret			6_{3}	8_{1}				6
136	(Netherlands) John van der Sanden (Germany) Ulf Steffens	(Singapore) #665 Giti Tire Motorsport by WS Racing	BMW M240i	C	10_{1}	Ret	C	Ret	5_{4}	Ret				5
136	(Germany) Frank Stippler G	(Lithuania) #8 Juta Racing	SP9 Pro-Am						Ret					5
136	(Germany) Frank Stippler G	(Germany) #64 HRT Ford Racing	SP9 Pro							4_{4}				5
136	(Germany) Frank Stippler G	(Germany) #65 HRT Ford Racing	SP9 Pro		Ret		C	9_{1}						5
136	(Germany) Dominik Fugel (Germany) Marcel Fugel	(Germany) #75 Max Kruse Racing	AT 1	C	2_{2}	1_{3}				Ret				5
136	(Germany) Max Schlichenmeier J	(Germany) #878 SRS Team Sorg Rennsport	BMW M2	C	5_{3}				3_{6}‡					5 (11)
136	(Germany) Max Schlichenmeier J	(Germany) #915 SRS Team Sorg Rennsport	CUP2			10_{1}			NC	9_{1}				5 (11)
136	(Germany) Janina Schall J L	(Singapore) #146 Giti Tire Motorsport by WS Racing	AT 2	C	DNS	2_{2}	C	2_{2}						5
136	(Germany) Janina Schall J L	(Germany) #977 Team Extreme Racing	CUP3							14_{1}				5
136	(Germany) Markus Nölken G	(Thailand) #945 Renazzo Motorsport	CUP3	C	15_{1}	10_{1}	C	7_{2}	12_{1}	Ret				5
144	(Kyrgyzstan) Oleg Kvitka G	(Armenia) #4 Goroyan RT by Car Collection	SP9 Pro-Am	C		2_{4}	C	Ret						4
144	(Switzerland) Flurin Zimmermann	(Germany) #112 TEAM JSCompetition	BMW 325i				C	2_{4}						4
144	(Germany) Max Kruse (Germany) Matthias Wasel G	(Germany) #819 Max Kruse Racing	SP3T			3_{4}								4
144	(Liechtenstein) Fabienne Wohlwend L	(Singapore) #146 Giti Tire Motorsport by WS Racing	AT 2	C	DNS	2_{2}	C	2_{2}						4
144	(Liechtenstein) Fabienne Wohlwend L	(Singapore) #646 Giti Tire Motorsport by WS Racing	SP10							Ret				4
144	(Switzerland) David Ackermann G (France) Jérôme Larbi	(Germany) #410 rent2Drive-MEHRTEC-racing	V6	C	WD		C	DNS	3_{2}	WD				4
144	(Switzerland) David Ackermann G (France) Jérôme Larbi	(Germany) #445 rent2Drive-MEHRTEC-racing	V5			3_{2}								4
144	(Germany) Ulrich Daniel Nölken	(Thailand) #945 Renazzo Motorsport	CUP3	C	15_{1}		C	7_{2}	12_{1}	Ret				4
144	(Germany) Lion Düker J (Germany) Christoph Krombach (Germany) Oliver Kunz G	(Germany) #982 W&S Motorsport	CUP3	C	9_{1}	9_{1}			8_{1}	9_{1}				4
144	(Germany) Christian Kraus (Norway) Peder Saltvedt J	(Germany) #952 Smyrlis Racing	CUP3	C	11_{1}	12_{1}			9_{1}	12_{1}				4
157	(Latvia) Patricija Stalidzane J L	(Austria) #7 Konrad Motorsport	SP9 Pro		6_{3}	Ret								3
157	(Latvia) Patricija Stalidzane J L	(Austria) #7 Konrad Motorsport	SP9 Pro-Am				C	Ret						3
157	(Latvia) Patricija Stalidzane J L	(Singapore) #146 Giti Tire Motorsport by WS Racing	AT 2	C										3
157	(Germany) Tobias Vazquez-Garcia	(Germany) #33 Kkrämer Racing	SP9 Pro-Am	C	Ret	DNS	C	6_{3}						3
157	(Poland) Damian Lempart	(Poland) #69 Apexwerk Racing	SP7	C	1_{3}									3
157	(Italy) Lorenzo Rocco di Torrepadula G	(Germany) #50 équipe vitesse	SP9 Am				C	3_{3}						3
157	(Germany) Stefan Kruse G	(Germany) #941 Adrenalin Motorsport Team Mainhattan Wheels	CUP3	C	10_{1}	Ret			7_{2}	Ret				3
157	(Germany) David Vogt	(Germany) #941 Adrenalin Motorsport Team Mainhattan Wheels	CUP3		10_{1}	Ret			7_{2}	Ret				3
157	(Germany) Maximilian Eisberg J (Sweden) Tommy Graberg G	(Germany) #969 SRS Team Sorg Rennsport	CUP3	C	8_{1}	8_{1}			NC	16_{1}				3
157	(Germany) Stefan Beyer G (Austria) Bernhard Wagner G	(Germany) #915 SRS Team Sorg Rennsport	CUP2	C	10_{1}	10_{1}			NC	9_{1}				3
167	(Germany) Benjamin Leuchter	(Germany) #44 Falken Motorsports	SP9 Pro			DSQ								2 (5)
167	(Germany) Benjamin Leuchter	(Germany) #75 Max Kruse Racing	AT 1	C	2_{2}	1_{3}‡				Ret				2 (5)
167	(India) Akshay Gupta	(Germany) #949 SRS Team Sorg Rennsport	CUP3	C	7_{2}	Ret								2
167	(Germany) Serge van Vooren G	(Germany) #505 Keeevin Motorsport	VT2-RWD	C	9_{1}	9_{1}	C	DNS	Ret					2
167	(Germany) Maximilian	(Germany) #979 SRS Team Sorg Rennsport	CUP3	C	12_{1}	13_{1}								2
171	(Germany) Kim Berwanger	(Germany) #966 asBest Racing	CUP3	C	Ret	Ret			Ret	11_{1}				1
171	(Germany) René Höber G	(Germany) #966 asBest Racing	CUP3		Ret	Ret			Ret	11_{1}				1
171	(Germany) Richard Gresek G	(Germany) #155 Plusline Motorsport	SP10	C			C	8_{1}	Ret	Ret				1
171	(Germany) Matthias Aretz	(Germany) #505 Keeevin Motorsport	VT2-RWD	C		9_{1}	C	DNS	Ret					1
Pos.	Driver	Team	Class	NLS1	NLS2	NLS3	24H-Q		NLS6	NLS7	NLS8	NLS9	NLS10	Points

==== Klassensieger-Trophäe (Class) ====
===== SP9 Pro =====
Pos.	Driver	Team	NLS1	NLS2	NLS3	24H-Q		NLS6	NLS7	NLS8	NLS9	NLS10	Points
1	(Germany) Frank Stippler	(Germany) #64 HRT Ford Racing							4_{4}	Ret	3_{4}	4_{3}	12
1	(Germany) Frank Stippler	(Germany) #65 HRT Ford Racing		Ret		C	9_{1}						12
2	(Ecuador) Mateo Villagomez	(Germany) #35 Walkenhorst Motorsport						3_{6}				Ret	6
3	(Latvia) Patricija Stalidzane	(Austria) #7 Konrad Motorsport		6_{3}	Ret								3
Non-championship entries
—	(South Africa) Jordan Pepper	(Germany) #77 Schubert Motorsport								1_{15}	Ret	3_{4}	(38)
—	(South Africa) Jordan Pepper	(Germany) #98 Rowe Racing	C										(38)
—	(South Africa) Jordan Pepper	(Germany) #99 Rowe Racing		1_{15}		C	5_{4}						(38)
—	(Germany) Tim Heinemann	(Germany) #44 Falken Motorsports		2_{11}		C	DNS	Ret		2_{11}	1_{8}	2_{6}	(36)
—	(Germany) Nico Menzel	(Germany) #17 Dunlop Motorsports	C	7_{2}				1_{11}		4_{6}	2_{6}	1_{8}	(33)
—	(Germany) Jens Klingmann	(Germany) #77 Schubert Motorsport		10_{1}				2_{8}	2_{8}	1_{15}	Ret		(32)
—	(Germany) Sven Müller	(Germany) #17 Dunlop Motorsports						1_{11}				1_{8}	(30)
—	(Germany) Sven Müller	(Germany) #44 Falken Motorsports		2_{11}		C	DNS					2_{6}	(30)
—	(Belgium) Ugo de Wilde	(Germany) #77 Schubert Motorsport		10_{1}		C	6_{3}		2_{8}	1_{15}	Ret		(27)
—	(United Kingdom) Dan Harper	(Germany) #1 FK Performance Motorsport							3_{5}				(20)
—	(United Kingdom) Dan Harper	(Germany) #99 Rowe Racing	C	1_{15}									(20)
—	(Germany) Christopher Haase	(Germany) #16 Scherer Sport PHX		5_{4}		C	1_{15}						(19)
—	(Netherlands) Morris Schuring	(Germany) #44 Falken Motorsports	C			C	DNS			2_{11}	1_{8}		(19)
—	(Netherlands) Robin Frijns	(Germany) #77 Schubert Motorsport	C		1_{11}			2_{8}					(19)
—	(Germany) Vincent Kolb	(Germany) #64 HRT Ford Racing	C						4_{4}	Ret	3_{4}	4_{3}	(17)
—	(Germany) Vincent Kolb	(Germany) #65 HRT Ford Racing			3_{6}								(17)
—	(Germany) Luca Stolz	(Germany) #80 Mercedes-AMG Team Ravenol	C			C	4_{6}		1_{10}				(16)
—	(Australia) Matt Campbell	(Germany) #911 Manthey Racing EMA			2_{8}	C	3_{8}						(16)
—	(United Kingdom) Alexander Sims (United Kingdom) Ben Green	(Germany) #16 Scherer Sport PHX				C	1_{15}						(15)
—	(Germany) Fabian Schiller	(Germany) #80 Mercedes-AMG Team Ravenol	C	Ret		C	4_{6}			3_{8}			(14)
—	(Italy) Mirko Bortolotti (Germany) Luca Engstler (Switzerland) Patric Niederhauser	(Germany) #130/84 Team ABT Sportsline		8_{1}		C	2_{11}						(12)
—	(Germany) Tim Tramnitz	(Germany) #77 Schubert Motorsport							2_{8}			3_{4}	(12)
—	(Norway) Christian Krognes	(Germany) #34 Walkenhorst Motorsport	C	4_{6}		C	Ret						(12)
—	(Norway) Christian Krognes	(Germany) #35 Walkenhorst Motorsport						3_{6}	NC			Ret	(12)
—	(Netherlands) Flynt Schuring	(Germany) #17 Dunlop Motorsports								4_{6}	2_{6}		(12)
—	(Austria) Philipp Eng (Germany) Marco Wittmann	(Germany) #77 Schubert Motorsport	C		1_{11}								(11)
—	(Japan) Kamui Kobayashi	(Hong Kong) #47 KCMG			4_{4}			5_{3}		5_{4}			(11)
—	(Estonia) Ralf Aron	(Germany) #80 Mercedes-AMG Team Ravenol							1_{10}				(10)
—	(Netherlands) Thierry Vermeulen	(Japan) #45 Realize Kondo Racing with Rinaldi	C	3_{8}		C	Ret						(8)
—	(South Africa) David Perel	(Japan) #45 Realize Kondo Racing with Rinaldi		3_{8}		C	Ret						(8)
—	(France) Thomas Neubauer	(Japan) #45 Realize Kondo Racing with Rinaldi	C	3_{8}									(8)
—	(Turkey) Ayhancan Güven	(Germany) #911 Manthey Racing EMA	C		2_{8}								(8)
—	(Austria) Thomas Preining	(Germany) #911 Manthey Racing EMA				C	3_{8}						(8)
—	(Germany) Jay Mo Härtling	(Germany) #80 Mercedes-AMG Team Ravenol								3_{8}			(8)
—	(Germany) Christopher Mies (Belgium) Frédéric Vervisch	(Germany) #64 HRT Ford Racing	C										(8)
—	(Germany) Christopher Mies (Belgium) Frédéric Vervisch	(Germany) #65 HRT Ford Racing			3_{6}								(8)
—	(Germany) Christopher Mies (Belgium) Frédéric Vervisch	(Germany) #67 HRT Ford Racing				C	7_{2}						(8)
—	(Denmark) Michael Christensen	(Italy) #54 Dinamic GT	C			C	10_{1}			Ret	4_{3}		(8)
—	(Denmark) Michael Christensen	(South Korea) #30 Hankook Competition						4_{4}					(8)
—	(Japan) Naoya Gamou	(Hong Kong) #47 KCMG				C	Ret	5_{3}		5_{4}			(7)
—	(Germany) Maro Engel	(Germany) #80 Mercedes-AMG Team Ravenol	C			C	4_{6}						(6)
—	(Italy) Mattia Drudi	(Germany) #34 Walkenhorst Motorsport	C	4_{6}									(6)
—	(Norway) Dennis Olsen	(Germany) #64 HRT Ford Racing	C										(6)
—	(Norway) Dennis Olsen	(Germany) #65 HRT Ford Racing			3_{6}								(6)
—	(South Africa) Leyton Fourie (Bulgaria) Pavel Lefterov (Netherlands) Maxime Oosten	(Germany) #1 FK Performance Motorsport							3_{5}				(5)
—	(Finland) Jesse Krohn (United Kingdom) David Pittard	(Hong Kong) #47 KCMG		9_{1}	4_{4}	C	Ret						(5)
—	(South Africa) Kelvin van der Linde	(Germany) #98 Rowe Racing		12_{1}									(5)
—	(South Africa) Kelvin van der Linde	(Germany) #99 Rowe Racing				C	5_{4}						(5)
—	(Germany) Max Hesse	(Germany) #99 Rowe Racing	C			C	5_{4}						(4)
—	(South Korea) Kim Jong-Kyum (United Arab Emirates) Récardo Bruins Choi	(South Korea) #30 Hankook Competition						4_{4}					(4)
—	(Germany) Nico Hantke	(Germany) #16 Scherer Sport PHX		5_{4}									(4)
—	(Italy) Edoardo Liberati	(Hong Kong) #47 KCMG			4_{4}								(4)
—	(Japan) Nirei Fukuzumi	(Hong Kong) #47 KCMG		9_{1}		C	Ret	5_{3}			DNS		(4)
—	(Belgium) Charles Weerts	(Germany) #77 Schubert Motorsport		10_{1}		C	6_{3}						(4)
—	(Germany) Christian Engelhart	(Austria) #7 Konrad Motorsport	C	6_{3}	Ret								(3)
—	(Germany) Maximilian Paul	(Austria) #7 Konrad Motorsport	C	6_{3}									(3)
—	(Netherlands) Loek Hartog	(Italy) #54 Dinamic GT		Ret						Ret	4_{3}		(3)
—	(France) Loris Cabirou Gomez	(Italy) #54 Dinamic GT									4_{3}		(3)
—	(Switzerland) Fabio Scherer	(Germany) #64 HRT Ford Racing		11_{1}									(3)
—	(Switzerland) Fabio Scherer	(Germany) #67 HRT Ford Racing				C	7_{2}						(3)
—	(France) Dorian Boccolacci	(Germany) #17 Dunlop Motorsports		7_{2}		C	DNS						(2)
—	(Netherlands) Colin Caresani	(Germany) #67 HRT Ford Racing				C	7_{2}						(2)
—	(India) Arjun Maini	(Germany) #64 HRT Ford Racing		11_{1}									(2)
—	(India) Arjun Maini	(Germany) #65 HRT Ford Racing				C	9_{1}						(2)
—	(Italy) Marco Mapelli	(Germany) #130 Team ABT Sportsline	C	8_{1}									(1)
—	(United Kingdom) Adam Christodoulou (Canada) Mikaël Grenier (United Kingdom) Chris Lulham	(Germany) #26 PROsport-Racing Team Bilstein				C	8_{1}						(1)
—	(Germany) Hubert Haupt (Germany) David Schumacher	(Germany) #65 HRT Ford Racing				C	9_{1}						(1)
—	(Japan) Sho Tsuboi	(Hong Kong) #47 KCMG		9_{1}							DNS		(1)
—	(Italy) Michele Beretta	(Italy) #54 Dinamic GT	C	Ret		C	10_{1}						(1)
—	(Germany) Joel Sturm	(Italy) #54 Dinamic GT		Ret		C	10_{1}						(1)
—	(France) Alessandro Ghiretti	(Italy) #54 Dinamic GT				C	10_{1}						(1)
—	(Netherlands) Max Verstappen	(Netherlands) #3 Mercedes-AMG Team Verstappen Racing		DSQ		C	11_{1}						(1)
—	(Austria) Lucas Auer	(Netherlands) #3 Mercedes-AMG Team Verstappen Racing	C			C	11_{1}						(1)
—	(Norway) Emil Christian Gjerdrum	(Germany) #64 HRT Ford Racing		11_{1}									(1)
—	(Brazil) Augusto Farfus (Switzerland) Raffaele Marciello	(Germany) #98 Rowe Racing	C	12_{1}									(1)
—	(Germany) Dennis Fetzer	(Germany) #35 Walkenhorst Motorsport							NC				—
—	(Germany) Dennis Marschall	(Japan) #45 Realize Kondo Racing with Rinaldi	C			C	Ret						—
—	(Belgium) Maxime Martin	(Germany) #80 Mercedes-AMG Team Ravenol	C	Ret									—
—	(Germany) Ben Dörr (Germany) Timo Glock (Germany) Timo Scheider (Germany) Volker Strycek	(Germany) #69 Dörr Motorsport				C	Ret						—
—	(Denmark) Nicki Thiim	(Germany) #34 Walkenhorst Motorsport				C	Ret						—
—	(Bulgaria) Pavel Lefterov	(Austria) #7 Konrad Motorsport			Ret								—
—	(Andorra) Jules Gounon (Spain) Daniel Juncadella	(Netherlands) #3 Mercedes-AMG Team Verstappen Racing	C	DSQ									—
—	(Austria) Klaus Bachler	(Germany) #44 Falken Motorsports	C		DSQ			Ret					—
—	(Germany) Benjamin Leuchter	(Germany) #44 Falken Motorsports			DSQ								—
—	(Belgium) Alessio Picariello	(Germany) #17 Dunlop Motorsports				C	DNS						—
—	(Germany) Christoph Breuer	(Germany) #911 Manthey Racing EMA				C	WD						—
—	(France) Julien Andlauer	(Germany) #17 Dunlop Motorsports	C										—
—	(Denmark) Bastian Buus	(Italy) #54 Dinamic GT	C										—
—	(Netherlands) Nicky Catsburg (United Kingdom) Nick Yelloly	(Germany) #130 Team ABT Sportsline	C										—
—	(South Africa) Sheldon van der Linde	(Germany) #99 Rowe Racing	C										—
—	(France) Kévin Estre	(Germany) #911 Manthey Racing EMA	C										—
Pos.	Driver	Team	NLS1	NLS2	NLS3	24H-Q		NLS6	NLS7	NLS8	NLS9	NLS10	Points

===== SP9 Pro-Am =====
Pos.	Driver	Team	NLS1	NLS2	NLS3	24H-Q		NLS6	NLS7	NLS8	NLS9	NLS10	Points
1	(Germany) Patrick Assenheimer (Germany) Tobias Müller (Luxembourg) Dylan Pereira	(Germany) #48 48LOSCH Motorsport by Black Falcon	C	1_{15}		C	Ret	1_{8}	1_{19}				42
4	(Germany) David Jahn (Germany) Moritz Kranz (Slovakia) Antal Zsigó	(Slovakia) #23 Gamota Racing	C	3_{8}	1_{6}	C	3_{8}	3_{4}	6_{4}				30
7	(Germany) Andreas Gülden (Japan) Yuichi Nakayama (Germany) Tim Sandtler	(Germany) #32 Toyo Tires with Ring Racing	C	4_{6}	3_{3}	C	DNS	4_{3}	4_{8}				20
10	(Armenia) Artur Goroyan	(Armenia) #4 Goroyan RT by Car Collection	C		2_{4}	C	Ret		2_{14}				18
11	(Germany) Dennis Fetzer (Ecuador) Mateo Villagomez	(Germany) #35 Walkenhorst Motorsport	C	2_{11}		C	DNS						11
13	(Kyrgyzstan) Oleg Kvitka	(Armenia) #4 Goroyan RT by Car Collection	C		2_{4}	C	Ret						4
14	(Germany) Fidel Leib (Germany) Tobias Vazquez-Garcia	(Germany) #33 Kkrämer Racing	C	Ret	DNS	C	6_{3}						3
14	(Germany) Karsten Krämer	(Germany) #33 Kkrämer Racing				C	6_{3}						3
Non-championship entries
—	(Germany) Ben Bünnagel (Estonia) Martin Rump	(Belgium) #123 Mühlner Motorsport				C	2_{11}		3_{10}				(21)
—	(Germany) Jay Mo Härtling (Germany) Kenneth Heyer (Germany) Jannes Fittje	(Germany) #11 Schnitzelalm Racing				C	1_{15}						(15)
—	(Germany) Felipe Fernández Laser	(Slovakia) #23 Gamota Racing							6_{4}				(15)
—	(Germany) Felipe Fernández Laser	(Germany) #35 Walkenhorst Motorsport	C	2_{11}		C	DNS						(15)
—	(Switzerland) Alex Fontana	(Armenia) #4 Goroyan RT by Car Collection	C						2_{14}				(14)
—	(Germany) Nico Menzel	(Armenia) #4 Goroyan RT by Car Collection							2_{14}				(14)
—	(Germany) Noah Nagelsdiek	(Belgium) #123 Mühlner Motorsport							3_{10}				(10)
—	(Canada) Steven Cho (South Korea) Kim Jong-Kyum (Netherlands) Récardo Bruins Choi (Germany) Marco Seefried	(South Korea) #30 Hankook Competition		Ret		C	4_{6}						(6)
—	(United Kingdom) Jake Hill (United Kingdom) Kyle Tilley	(Germany) #18 Lionspeed GP				C	DNS						(6)
—	(United Kingdom) Jake Hill (United Kingdom) Kyle Tilley	(United States) #20 Era Motorsport							Ret				(6)
—	(United Kingdom) Jake Hill (United Kingdom) Kyle Tilley	(Germany) #26 PROsport-Racing Team Bilstein						2_{6}					(6)
—	(United Kingdom) Adam Christodoulou	(United States) #20 Era Motorsport							Ret				(6)
—	(United Kingdom) Adam Christodoulou	(Germany) #26 PROsport-Racing Team Bilstein						2_{6}					(6)
—	(Germany) Ben Dörr (Germany) Phil Dörr (Germany) Volker Strycek	(Germany) #25 Dörr Motorsport							5_{5}				(5)
—	(France) Nathanaël Berthon	(Armenia) #4 Goroyan RT by Car Collection			2_{4}	C	Ret						(4)
—	(Denmark) Anders Fjordbach (China) Li Kerong (China) Ye Hongli	(Denmark) #86 High Class Racing				C	5_{4}						(4)
—	(Germany) Michele di Martino	(Germany) #33 Kkrämer Racing	C	Ret	DNS	C	6_{3}						(3)
—	(Germany) Otto Blank (Germany) Björn Großmann	(Lithuania) #9/71 Juta Racing			4_{2}	C	Ret						(2)
—	(Germany) Pierre Kaffer	(Lithuania) #9 Juta Racing			4_{2}								(2)
—	(Netherlands) Daan Arrow	(Germany) #48 48LOSCH Motorsport by Black Falcon				C	Ret						—
—	(Bulgaria) Pavel Lefterov (Germany) Maximilian Paul	(Austria) #7 Konrad Motorsport				C	Ret						—
—	(Germany) Christer Jöns	(Lithuania) #71 Juta Racing				C	Ret						—
—	(Latvia) Patricija Stalidzane	(Austria) #7 Konrad Motorsport				C	Ret						—
—	(Germany) Christopher Brück	(Germany) #33 Kkrämer Racing		Ret									—
—	(Germany) Hubert Haupt (Germany) David Schumacher	(Germany) #65 HRT Ford Racing		Ret									—
—	(Germany) Alexey Veremenko (Germany) "Selv" (Germany) Frank Stippler	(Lithuania) #8 Juta Racing						Ret					—
—	(Belgium) Simon Balcaen (France) Steven Palette	(Germany) #26 PROsport-Racing Team Bilstein							Ret				—
—	(Germany) Stefan Aust	(Germany) #35 Walkenhorst Motorsport				C	DNS						—
—	(Norway) Anders Buchardt (Germany) Nico Hantke (Netherlands) Mex Jansen (Germany) Henry Walkenhorst	(Germany) #39 Walkenhorst Motorsport				C	DNS						—
—	(Germany) Patrick Kolb	(Germany) #18 Lionspeed GP				C	DNS						—
Pos.	Driver	Team	NLS1	NLS2	NLS3	24H-Q		NLS6	NLS7	NLS8	NLS9	NLS10	Points

===== SP9 Am =====
Pos.	Driver	Team	NLS1	NLS2	NLS3	24H-Q		NLS6	NLS7	NLS8	NLS9	NLS10	Points
1	(Turkey) Mustafa-Mehmet Kaya (Germany) Mike Stursberg	(Germany) #5 Black Falcon Team EAE		1_{6}	1_{6}	C	1_{6}	2_{8}	2_{14}				40
3	(Germany) Christoph Breuer (Thailand) Kiki Sak Nana	(Thailand) #786 Renazzo Motorsport	C	Ret	2_{4}			1_{11}	1_{19}				34
5	(Belgium) Guido Dumarey	(Germany) #37 PROsport-Racing	C	3_{3}	3_{3}	C	4_{2}	3_{6}	5_{5}				19
6	(Belgium) Maxime Dumarey	(Germany) #27 PROsport-Racing				C	DNS						17
6	(Belgium) Maxime Dumarey	(Germany) #37 PROsport-Racing	C	3_{3}	3_{3}	C	4_{2}‡	3_{6}	5_{5}				17
7	(Germany) Alexey Veremenko (Germany) "Selv"	(Lithuania) #8 Juta Racing	C	2_{4}		C	2_{4}		4_{8}				16
9	(Germany) Dieter Schmidtmann	(Thailand) #786 Renazzo Motorsport	C	Ret	2_{4}			1_{11}					15
10	(Germany) Michael Heimrich (Germany) Arno Klasen	(Germany) #50 équipe vitesse				C	3_{3}	5_{3}	6_{4}				10
10	(Germany) Fidel Leib	(Germany) #2 Team Joos Sportwagentechnik							3_{10}				10
10	(Germany) Fidel Leib	(Germany) #33 Kkrämer Racing						Ret					10
13	(Italy) Lorenzo Rocco di Torrepadula	(Germany) #50 équipe vitesse				C	3_{3}						3
Non-championship entries
—	(Italy) Gabriele Piana	(Germany) #5 Black Falcon Team EAE		1_{6}		C	1_{6}	2_{8}	2_{14}				(34)
—	(Germany) Thomas Mutsch	(Thailand) #786 Renazzo Motorsport			2_{4}				1_{19}				(23)
—	(Germany) Michael Joos (Germany) Marco Lamsouguer	(Germany) #2 Team Joos Sportwagentechnik							3_{10}				(10)
—	(Germany) Marek Böckmann	(Germany) #27 PROsport-Racing				C	DNS						(8)
—	(Germany) Marek Böckmann	(Germany) #37 PROsport-Racing		3_{3}					5_{5}				(8)
—	(Belgium) Aris Balanian	(Germany) #50 équipe vitesse						5_{3}	6_{4}				(7)
—	(Netherlands) Daan Arrow	(Germany) #5 Black Falcon Team EAE			1_{6}								(6)
—	(Germany) Thomas Kiefer	(Germany) #5 Black Falcon Team EAE				C	1_{6}						(6)
—	(Germany) Pierre Lemmerz (Germany) Alexander Kroker	#6 (Audi R8 LMS Evo)						4_{4}	Ret				(4)
—	(Germany) Markus Lönnroth	(Germany) #37 PROsport-Racing			3_{3}	C	NC						(3)
—	(Germany) Tobias Wahl	(Germany) #27 PROsport-Racing				C	DNS						(2)
—	(Germany) Tobias Wahl	(Germany) #33 Kkrämer Racing						Ret					(2)
—	(Germany) Tobias Wahl	(Germany) #37 PROsport-Racing				C	4_{2}						(2)
—	(Germany) Peter Posavac (Germany) Michael Funke (Germany) Frank Nikolaus	(Netherlands) #40 Koopman Racing			Ret								—
—	(Germany) Michele di Martino	(Germany) #33 Kkrämer Racing						Ret					—
—	(Germany) Andreas Ziegler	#6 (Audi R8 LMS Evo)							Ret				—
—	(Germany) Julian Reeh (Germany) Ralf Schall (Germany) Christian Scherer (Germany) Henry Walkenhorst	(Germany) #36 Saugmotoren Motorsport				C	DNS						—
—	(Germany) Maik Rönnefarth	(Germany) #27 PROsport-Racing				C	DNS						—
Pos.	Driver	Team	NLS1	NLS2	NLS3	24H-Q		NLS6	NLS7	NLS8	NLS9	NLS10	Points

===== SP10 =====
Pos.	Driver	Team	NLS1	NLS2	NLS3	24H-Q		NLS6	NLS7	NLS8	NLS9	NLS10	Points
1	(Germany) Anton Abée (Germany) Yannik Himmels (Germany) Jörg Viebahn	(Germany) #176 PROsport-Racing	C	1_{15}	3_{8}	C	3_{8}	1_{11}	2_{14}				56
4	(Romania) Alexandru Vasilescu	(Germany) #177 AV Racing by Black Falcon	C	2_{11}	1_{15}	C	6_{3}	3_{6}	1_{19}				54
5	(United States) David Ogburn	(Germany) #177 AV Racing by Black Falcon	C		1_{15}				1_{19}				46
5	(United States) David Ogburn	(Germany) #180 AV Racing by Black Falcon		4_{6}		C	4_{6}						46
6	(United States) Charles Russell Turner	(Germany) #177 AV Racing by Black Falcon		2_{11}		C	6_{3}		1_{19}				44
6	(United States) Charles Russell Turner	(Germany) #180 AV Racing by Black Falcon	C		2_{11}								44
7	(United States) Malcolm Harrison	(Germany) #177 AV Racing by Black Falcon	C		1_{15}			3_{6}	1_{19}				40
8	(United States) Judson Holt (United States) Denny Stripling	(Germany) #180 AV Racing by Black Falcon	C	4_{6}	2_{11}	C	4_{6}						23
10	(Switzerland) Martin Kroll	(Switzerland) #189 Hofor Racing by Bonk Motorsport	C	5_{4}	4_{6}	C	7_{2}	4_{4}	7_{3}				19
11	(Germany) Stephan Brodmerkel	(Germany) #164 W&S Motorsport	C	7_{2}	7_{2}			Ret	5_{5}				9
12	(Germany) Maik Rönnefarth	(Germany) #155 Plusline Motorsport	C	3_{8}		C	WD	Ret					8
13	(Germany) Jürgen Vöhringer	(Germany) #164 W&S Motorsport	C	7_{2}				Ret	5_{5}				7
14	(Germany) Richard Gresek	(Germany) #155 Plusline Motorsport	C			C	8_{1}	Ret	Ret				1
14	(Germany) Danny Brink	#188 (Audi R8 LMS GT4 Evo)			9_{1}								1
Non-championship entries
—	(Japan) Kazuto Kotaka (Japan) Miki Koyama	(Germany) #170 Toyo Tires with Ring Racing		Ret		C	1_{15}	2_{8}					(23)
—	(Germany) Maximilian Partl (Germany) Philip Wiskirchen	(Switzerland) #190/188 Hofor Racing by Bonk Motorsport				C	2_{11}		3_{10}				(21)
—	(Japan) Shunji Okumoto	(Germany) #170 Toyo Tires with Ring Racing	C			C	1_{15}						(15)
—	(France) Giuliano Alesi	(Germany) #170 Toyo Tires with Ring Racing				C	1_{15}						(15)
—	(Germany) Michael Bonk	(Switzerland) #189 Hofor Racing by Bonk Motorsport	C		4_{6}	C	7_{2}	4_{4}	7_{3}				(15)
—	(Romania) Sergiu Nicolae	(Germany) #177 AV Racing by Black Falcon		2_{11}									(11)
—	(Germany) Michael Schrey	(Switzerland) #188 Hofor Racing by Bonk Motorsport				C	2_{11}						(11)
—	(Germany) Felix Partl	(Switzerland) #190 Hofor Racing by Bonk Motorsport							3_{10}				(10)
—	(Germany) Christian Konnerth	(Germany) #155 Plusline Motorsport		3_{8}					Ret				(8)
—	(Germany) Tobias Wahl	(Germany) #155 Plusline Motorsport		3_{8}									(8)
—	(Germany) Timo Bernhard (Germany) Jörg Bergmeister	(Germany) #718 Team75 Bernhard							4^{8}				(8)
—	(Germany) Hendrik Still	(Germany) #164 W&S Motorsport	C	7_{2}				Ret	5_{5}				(7)
—	(Austria) Constantin Schöll	(Germany) #164 W&S Motorsport			7_{2}			Ret	5_{5}				(7)
—	(Germany) Jens Moetefindt	(Switzerland) #189 Hofor Racing by Bonk Motorsport						4_{4}	7_{3}				(7)
—	(United States) Charles Espenlaub	(Germany) #177 AV Racing by Black Falcon						3_{6}					(6)
—	(Germany) Thorsten Wolter	(Switzerland) #189 Hofor Racing by Bonk Motorsport		5_{4}		C	7_{2}						(6)
—	(Belgium) Aris Balanian (France) Joshua Bednarski (United Kingdom) Peter Cate (Germany) Tom Schütze	(Germany) #145 Cerny Motorsport				C	5_{4}						(4)
—	(Belgium) Jacques Derenne (United Kingdom) Kyle Tilley	(Germany) #174 PROsport-Racing			5_{4}								(4)
—	(Germany) Montego Maassen (Dominican Republic) Joel Monegro (Switzerland) Alexander Fach	(Germany) #191 Car Collection Motorsport							6_{4}				(4)
—	(Germany) Philipp Hagnauer (Germany) Alexander Walker	(Switzerland) #171 BSL Racing Team		6_{3}		C	9_{1}						(4)
—	(Sweden) Gustav Bard	(Germany) #175 PROsport-Racing			6_{3}	C	11_{1}						(4)
—	(United States) Mark Smith	(Germany) #177 AV Racing by Black Falcon				C	6_{3}						(3)
—	(Sweden) Patrick Skoog	(Germany) #175 PROsport-Racing			6_{3}								(3)
—	(Germany) Yanis Anhorn	(Germany) #164 W&S Motorsport			7_{2}								(2)
—	(Denmark) Anders Fjordbach (China) Li Kerong (China) Ye Hongli	(Germany) #181 SRS Team Sorg Rennsport	C	8_{1}									(1)
—	(France) Hadrien David (France) Edgar Pierre	(Japan) #178 Toyota Racing United			8_{1}								(1)
—	(Sweden) Eric Ullström	(Switzerland) #171 BSL Racing Team				C	9_{1}						(1)
—	(Germany) Markus Bückle (Germany) Moritz Rosenbach	#188 (Audi R8 LMS GT4 Evo)			9_{1}								(1)
—	(Belgium) Lucas Cartelle (Spain) Javier Sagrera (Germany) Hugo Schwarze	(Japan) #90 Toyota Racing United				C	10_{1}						(1)
—	(Germany) Carsten Kautz (Portugal) Guilherme Oliveira	(Germany) #175 PROsport-Racing				C	11_{1}						(1)
—	(Germany) Michelle Halder (United Kingdom) Chloe Chong (Liechtenstein) Fabienne Wohlwend	(Singapore) #646 Giti Tire Motorsport by WS Racing							Ret				—
—	(Germany) Philipp Gresek	(Germany) #155 Plusline Motorsport	C										—
—	(Japan) Yuichi Nakayama	(Germany) #170 Toyo Tires with Ring Racing	C										—
—	(United Kingdom) Chris Lulham	(Germany) #175 PROsport-Racing				C	WD						—
Pos.	Driver	Team	NLS1	NLS2	NLS3	24H-Q		NLS6	NLS7	NLS8	NLS9	NLS10	Points

===== SP10 Pro-Am =====
Pos.	Driver	Team	NLS1	NLS2	NLS3	24H-Q		NLS6	NLS7	NLS8	NLS9	NLS10	Points
1	(Germany) Anton Abée (Germany) Yannik Himmels (Germany) Jörg Viebahn	(Germany) #176 PROsport-Racing	C	1_{15}	3_{8}	C	3_{8}	1_{11}	2_{14}				56
Non-championship entries
—	(Germany) Max Partl (Germany) Philip Wiskirchen	(Switzerland) #188 Hofor Racing by Bonk Motorsport				C	2_{11}		3_{10}				(21)
—	(Germany) Michael Schrey	(Switzerland) #188 Hofor Racing by Bonk Motorsport				C	2_{11}						(11)
—	(Germany) Felix Partl	(Switzerland) #190 Hofor Racing by Bonk Motorsport							3_{10}				(10)
—	(Belgium) Aris Balanian (France) Joshua Bednarski (United Kingdom) Peter Cate (Germany) Tom Schütze	(Germany) #145 Cerny Motorsport				C	5_{4}						(4)
—	(Germany) Montego Maassen (Dominican Republic) Joel Monegro (Switzerland) Alexander Fach	(Germany) #191 Car Collection Motorsport							6_{4}				(4)
—	(Denmark) Anders Fjordbach (China) Li Kerong (China) Ye Hongli	(Germany) #181 SRS Team Sorg Rennsport	C	8_{1}									(1)
—	(Belgium) Lucas Cartelle (Spain) Javier Sagrera (Germany) Hugo Schwarze	(Japan) #90 Toyota Racing United				C	10_{1}						(1)
Pos.	Driver	Team	NLS1	NLS2	NLS3	24H-Q		NLS6	NLS7	NLS8	NLS9	NLS10	Points

===== SP10 Am =====
Pos.	Driver	Team	NLS1	NLS2	NLS3	24H-Q		NLS6	NLS7	NLS8	NLS9	NLS10	Points
1	(Romania) Alexandru Vasilescu	(Germany) #177 AV Racing by Black Falcon	C	2_{11}	1_{15}	C	6_{3}	3_{6}	1_{19}				54
2	(United States) David Ogburn	(Germany) #177 AV Racing by Black Falcon	C		1_{15}				1_{19}				46
2	(United States) David Ogburn	(Germany) #180 AV Racing by Black Falcon		4_{6}		C	4_{6}						46
3	(United States) Charles Russell Turner	(Germany) #177 AV Racing by Black Falcon		2_{11}		C	6_{3}		1_{19}				44
3	(United States) Charles Russell Turner	(Germany) #180 AV Racing by Black Falcon	C		2_{11}								44
4	(United States) Malcolm Harrison	(Germany) #177 AV Racing by Black Falcon	C		1_{15}			3_{6}	1_{19}				40
5	(United States) Judson Holt (United States) Denny Stripling	(Germany) #180 AV Racing by Black Falcon	C	4_{6}	2_{11}	C	4_{6}						23
7	(Switzerland) Martin Kroll	(Switzerland) #189 Hofor Racing by Bonk Motorsport	C	5_{4}	4_{6}	C	7_{2}		7_{3}				15
8	(Germany) Stephan Brodmerkel	(Germany) #164 W&S Motorsport	C	7_{2}	7_{2}			Ret	5_{5}				9
9	(Germany) Maik Rönnefarth	(Germany) #155 Plusline Motorsport	C	3_{8}		C	WD	Ret					8
10	(Germany) Jürgen Vöhringer	(Germany) #164 W&S Motorsport	C	7_{2}				Ret	5_{5}				7
Non-championship entries
—	(Germany) Michael Bonk	(Switzerland) #189 Hofor Racing by Bonk Motorsport	C		4_{6}	C	7_{2}	4_{4}	7_{3}				(15)
—	(Romania) Sergiu Nicolae	(Germany) #177 AV Racing by Black Falcon		2_{11}									(11)
—	(Germany) Christian Konnerth	(Germany) #155 Plusline Motorsport		3_{8}					Ret				(8)
—	(Germany) Tobias Wahl	(Germany) #155 Plusline Motorsport		3_{8}									(8)
—	(Germany) Hendrik Still	(Germany) #164 W&S Motorsport	C	7_{2}				Ret	5_{5}				(7)
—	(Austria) Constantin Schöll	(Germany) #164 W&S Motorsport			7_{2}			Ret	5_{5}				(7)
—	(United States) Charles Espenlaub	(Germany) #177 AV Racing by Black Falcon						3_{6}					(6)
—	(Germany) Thorsten Wolter	(Switzerland) #189 Hofor Racing by Bonk Motorsport		5_{4}		C	7_{2}						(6)
—	(Germany) Philipp Hagnauer (Germany) Alexander Walker	(Switzerland) #171 BSL Racing Team		6_{3}		C	9_{1}						(4)
—	(United States) Mark Smith	(Germany) #177 AV Racing by Black Falcon				C	6_{3}						(3)
—	(Germany) Jens Moetefindt	(Switzerland) #189 Hofor Racing by Bonk Motorsport							7_{3}				(3)
—	(Germany) Yanis Anhorn	(Germany) #164 W&S Motorsport			7_{2}								(2)
—	(Germany) Richard Gresek	(Germany) #155 Plusline Motorsport	C			C	8_{1}	Ret	Ret				(1)
—	(Sweden) Eric Ullström	(Switzerland) #171 BSL Racing Team				C	9_{1}						(1)
—	(Sweden) Gustav Bard (Germany) Carsten Kautz (Portugal) Guilherme Oliveira	(Germany) #175 PROsport-Racing				C	11_{1}						(1)
—	(Germany) Philipp Gresek	(Germany) #155 Plusline Motorsport	C										—
—	(Japan) Yuichi Nakayama (Japan) Shunji Okumoto	(Germany) #170 Toyo Tires with Ring Racing	C										—
—	(United Kingdom) Chris Lulham	(Germany) #175 PROsport-Racing				C	WD						—
Pos.	Driver	Team	NLS1	NLS2	NLS3	24H-Q		NLS6	NLS7	NLS8	NLS9	NLS10	Points

===== SP7 =====
Pos.	Driver	Team	NLS1	NLS2	NLS3	24H-Q		NLS6	NLS7	NLS8	NLS9	NLS10	Points
1	(Poland) Damian Lempart	(Poland) #69 Apexwerk Racing	C	1_{3}									3
Non-championship entries
—	(Germany) Hendrik Still (Denmark) Michelle Gatting (Germany) Marco Seefried	(Germany) #72 W&S Motorsport							1_{8}				(8)
—	(Poland) Jacek Pydys	(Poland) #69 Apexwerk Racing	C	1_{3}									(6)
—	(Poland) Jacek Pydys	(Germany) #82 tm-racing.org				C	1_{3}	Ret					(6)
—	(Belgium) Kris Cools (Czech Republic) Milan Kodídek (Germany) Ralf Schall	(Germany) #71 RPM Racing						Ret	2_{5}				(5)
—	(South Korea) Choi Jang-han	(Germany) #71 RPM Racing							2_{5}				(5)
—	(Germany) Benedikt Höpfer (Germany) Marco Vitonelli	(Germany) #82 tm-racing.org	C	2_{2}	Ret	C	1_{3}	Ret					(5)
—	(Australia) Yasser Shahin (Italy) Enzo Trulli (Finland) Marcus Amand (Germany) Jürgen Marzi	(Germany) #420 Four Motors Bioconcept-Car							3_{4}				(4)
—	(Germany) Christoph Ruhrmann (Germany) Manfred Weber	(Germany) #89 Up2Race			1_{3}								(3)
—	(Germany) Michael Schröder	(Germany) #82 tm-racing.org			Ret	C	NC						—
—	(Germany) Lukas Ertl (Germany) Maximilian Johannes Ertl (Germany) Stefan Ertl	(Austria) #91 Reiter Engineering				C	Ret						—
—	(Germany) Paul Hochberger (Germany) Tom Nittel (Germany) Marco Reinbold	#169 (Porsche 718 Cayman GT4 RS Clubsport)							Ret				—
—	(Germany) Henning Cramer (Switzerland) Marc Schöni (Germany) Oliver Sprungmann	(Germany) #420 Four Motors Bioconcept-Car				C	WD						—
—	(Switzerland) Marco Grilli	(Germany) #70 asBest Racing	C										—
—	(Germany) Fabio Sacchi	(Germany) #82 tm-racing.org	C										—
Pos.	Driver	Team	NLS1	NLS2	NLS3	24H-Q		NLS6	NLS7	NLS8	NLS9	NLS10	Points

===== SP3T =====
Pos.	Driver	Team	NLS1	NLS2	NLS3	24H-Q		NLS6	NLS7	NLS8	NLS9	NLS10	Points
1	(Germany) Oliver Kriese	(Germany) #300 Ollis Garage Racing	C	3_{3}	5_{2}	C	3_{2}	3_{6}	Ret				13
2	(Germany) Danny Brink	(Germany) #322 Sharky Racing	C	2_{4}									12
2	(Germany) Danny Brink	(Germany) #808 asBest Racing						2_{8}					12
3	(Germany) Rudi Speich	(Germany) #317 2R Racing			2_{6}								6
3	(Netherlands) Misha Charoudin	(Germany) #300 Ollis Garage Racing						3_{6}					6
5	(Germany) Max Kruse (Germany) Matthias Wasel	(Germany) #819 Max Kruse Racing			3_{4}								4
Non-championship entries
—	(Germany) Claudius Karch (Germany) Achim Wawer	(Germany) #312 Schmickler Performance powered by Ravenol			1_{8}			1_{11}					(19)
—	(Germany) Moritz Thomas Rosenbach	(Germany) #321 Sharky Racing		1_{6}									(14)
—	(Germany) Moritz Thomas Rosenbach	(Germany) #808 asBest Racing						2_{8}					(14)
—	(Germany) Carlos Fahrbach (Germany) Franco Fahrbach (Germany) Luca Wieninger	(Germany) #819 Max Kruse Racing							1_{10}				(10)
—	(Germany) Markus Bückle	(Germany) #321 Sharky Racing		1_{6}									(9)
—	(Germany) Markus Bückle	(Germany) #322 Sharky Racing	C	2_{4}	4_{3}								(9)
—	(Germany) Jens Wulf	(Germany) #808 asBest Racing						2_{8}	Ret				(8)
—	(Germany) Jann Jöge (Germany) Justin Mücke (Latvia) Ivars Vallers	(Germany) #321 Sharky Racing							2_{8}				(8)
—	(Germany) Robert Neumann	(Germany) #300 Ollis Garage Racing			5_{2}			3_{6}	Ret				(8)
—	(Italy) Gian Maria Gabbiani	(Germany) #321 Sharky Racing	C										(7)
—	(Italy) Gian Maria Gabbiani	(Germany) #322 Sharky Racing		2_{4}	4_{3}								(7)
—	(France) Nathanaël Berthon (Brazil) Pedro Carvalho Ebrahim	(Germany) #321 Sharky Racing	C	1_{6}									(6)
—	(Germany) Wolfgang Haugg (Germany) Roland Waschkau	(Germany) #317 2R Racing			2_{6}								(6)
—	(Bulgaria) Boyko Milanov Shopov (Bulgaria) Yordan Mihaylov Stefanov (Bulgaria) Aleksander Antoniev Yankov (Bulgaria) Ventsislav Krasimirov Raychinov	(Germany) #323 (Volkswagen Golf VII TCR)							3_{5}				(5)
—	(Switzerland) Armando Stanco (Switzerland) Dario Stanco	(Germany) #323 Autohaus Winterthur GmbH				C	1_{4}						(4)
—	(Germany) Sascha Siegert	(Germany) #322 Sharky Racing		2_{4}									(4)
—	(Germany) Jens Dralle (Germany) Christoph Lenz	(Germany) #819 Max Kruse Racing			3_{4}								(4)
—	(Germany) Thomas Ardelt (Germany) Manuel Dormagen (Germany) Sven Oepen	(Germany) #800 asBest Racing				C	2_{3}						(3)
—	(Germany) Mats Heidler (Germany) Carsten Kautz	(Germany) #322 Sharky Racing			4_{3}								(3)
—	(Germany) Christian Geilfus	(Germany) #300 Ollis Garage Racing				C	3_{2}						(2)
—	(South Africa) Jonathan Mogotsi (Netherlands) Simon van Roon	(Germany) #819 Max Kruse Racing		Ret									—
—	(Germany) Stephan Epp (Germany) Heiko Hammel (Germany) Timo Hochwind	(Germany) #10 Max Kruse Racing						Ret					—
—	(Austria) Tobias Poschik (Germany) Lennard Falk von Canal	(Germany) #321 Sharky Racing						Ret					—
—	(Germany) Axel Duffner (Germany) Mario Fuchs (Germany) Eugen Weber	#333 (Mitsubishi Lancer CT9A)						Ret					—
—	(Germany) Gregor Starck	(Germany) #300 Ollis Garage Racing							Ret				—
—	(Germany) Mark Trompeter (Germany) Christian Andreas Franz	(Germany) #808 asBest Racing							Ret				—
—	(Switzerland) Miklas Born	(Germany) #322 Sharky Racing	C										—
Pos.	Driver	Team	NLS1	NLS2	NLS3	24H-Q		NLS6	NLS7	NLS8	NLS9	NLS10	Points

===== AT 1 =====
Pos.	Driver	Team	NLS1	NLS2	NLS3	24H-Q	NLS6	NLS7	NLS8	NLS9	NLS10	Points
1	(Netherlands) Jan Jaap van Roon	(Germany) #19 Max Kruse Racing		1_{3}	Ret			2_{4}				7
2	(Germany) Dominik Fugel (Germany) Marcel Fugel	(Germany) #75 Max Kruse Racing	C	2_{2}	1_{3}			Ret				5
4	(Germany) Benjamin Leuchter	(Germany) #75 Max Kruse Racing	C	2_{2}	1_{3}‡			Ret				2
Non-championship entries
—	(Switzerland) Christoph Lenz (Germany) Nico Otto	(Germany) #11 Max Kruse Racing					2_{2}	1_{5}				(7)
—	(Netherlands) Tom Coronel	(Germany) #19 Max Kruse Racing		1_{3}	Ret			2_{4}				(7)
—	(Germany) Finn Zulauf	(Germany) #11 Max Kruse Racing						1_{5}				(5)
—	(Netherlands) Rudy van Buren	(Germany) #19 Max Kruse Racing		1_{3}								(3)
—	(Germany) Roland Froese (Germany) Carrie Schreiner (Germany) Andreas Ziegler	(Germany) #18 équipe vitesse					1_{3}					(3)
—	(Germany) Christian Kohlhaas	(Germany) #11 Max Kruse Racing					2_{2}					(2)
—	(Germany) Christian Kohlhaas	(Germany) #19 Max Kruse Racing			Ret							(2)
Pos.	Driver	Team	NLS1	NLS2	NLS3	24H-Q	NLS6	NLS7	NLS8	NLS9	NLS10	Points

===== AT 2 =====
Pos.	Driver	Team	NLS1	NLS2	NLS3	24H-Q		NLS6	NLS7	NLS8	NLS9	NLS10	Points
1	(United Kingdom) Jimmy Broadbent (United Kingdom) Steve Alvarez Brown (Netherlands) Misha Charoudin	(Germany) #632 Black Falcon Team Fanatec	C	1_{2}	1_{3}	C	1_{3}		1_{3}				11
1	(Germany) Manuel Metzger	(Germany) #632 Black Falcon Team Fanatec		1_{2}	1_{3}	C	1_{3}		1_{3}				11
5	(Germany) Janina Schall (Liechtenstein) Fabienne Wohlwend	(Singapore) #146 Giti Tire Motorsport by WS Racing	C	DNS	2_{2}	C	2_{2}						4
Non-championship entries
—	(Germany) Carrie Schreiner	(Singapore) #146 Giti Tire Motorsport by WS Racing		DNS		C	2_{2}						(2)
—	(Germany) Michelle Halder	(Singapore) #146 Giti Tire Motorsport by WS Racing				C	2_{2}						(2)
—	(United Kingdom) Chloe Chong	(Singapore) #146 Giti Tire Motorsport by WS Racing			2_{2}								(2)
—	(Denmark) Henrik Bollerslev (Germany) Thomas von Löwis of Menar (Germany) Smudo	(Germany) #320 Four Motors Bioconcept-Car				C	WD						—
—	(Latvia) Patricija Stalidzane	(Singapore) #146 Giti Tire Motorsport by WS Racing	C										—
Pos.	Driver	Team	NLS1	NLS2	NLS3	24H-Q		NLS6	NLS7	NLS8	NLS9	NLS10	Points

===== TCR =====
Pos.	Driver	Team	NLS1	NLS2	NLS3	24H-Q		NLS6	NLS7	NLS8	NLS9	NLS10	Points
1	(Norway) Håkon Schjærin	(Norway) #801 Møller Bil Motorsport		NC	1_{4}			1_{2}					6
Non-championship entries
—	(Norway) Kenneth Østvold	(Norway) #801 Møller Bil Motorsport		NC	1_{4}			1_{2}					(6)
—	(Latvia) Ivars Vallers	(Latvia) #821 LV Racing			2_{3}				1_{3}				(6)
—	(Norway) Anders Lindstad	(Norway) #801 Møller Bil Motorsport			1_{4}								(4)
—	(Germany) Dirk Groneck (Germany) Marco Knappmeier	(Germany) #89 KMA-Racing				C	1_{3}						(3)
—	(Sweden) Mikaela Åhlin-Kottulinsky (Germany) Philipp Eis	(Latvia) #821 LV Racing			2_{3}								(3)
—	(Austria) Tobias Poschik (Italy) Gian Maria Gabbiani	(Latvia) #821 LV Racing							1_{3}				(3)
—	(Norway) Atle Gulbrandsen	(Norway) #801 Møller Bil Motorsport		NC				1_{2}					(2)
—	(Germany) Jens Wulf	(Germany) #808 asBest Racing	C		3_{2}								(2)
—	(Germany) Dennis Leißing (Germany) Mark Trompeter	(Germany) #808 asBest Racing			3_{2}								(2)
—	(Spain) Mikel Azcona (Germany) Marc Basseng (Germany) Nico Bastian (Germany) Manuel Lauck	(South Korea) #830 Hyundai Motorsport N				C	Ret						—
Pos.	Driver	Team	NLS1	NLS2	NLS3	24H-Q		NLS6	NLS7	NLS8	NLS9	NLS10	Points

===== V6 =====
Pos.	Driver	Team	NLS1	NLS2	NLS3	24H-Q		NLS6	NLS7	NLS8	NLS9	NLS10	Points
1	(Germany) Christian Büllesbach (Germany) Klaus Faßbender (Germany) Andreas Schettler	(Germany) #396 Adrenalin Motorsport Team Mainhattan Wheels	C	Ret	Ret	C	2_{2}	1_{4}	1_{4}				10
4	(Switzerland) David Ackermann (France) Jérôme Larbi	(Germany) #410 rent2Drive-MEHRTEC-racing	C	WD		C	DNS	3_{2}	WD				2
Non-championship entries
—	(Germany) Christian Heuchemer (Germany) Thomas Heuchemer	(Germany) #400 Schmickler Performance powered by Ravenol	C	1_{4}	1_{3}			2_{3}	2_{3}				(13)
—	(Germany) Sascha Kloft	(Germany) #400 Schmickler Performance powered by Ravenol		1_{4}	1_{3}			2_{3}	2_{3}				(13)
—	(Germany) Daniel Zils	(Germany) #396 Adrenalin Motorsport Team Mainhattan Wheels	C	Ret	Ret			1_{4}	1_{4}				(8)
—	(Germany) Bastian Arend (Germany) Maximilian Arnold (Germany) Sebastian Rings	(Germany) #416/415 Köppen Motorsport		2_{3}		C	1_{3}						(6)
—	(Germany) Stephan Epp (Germany) Stefan Müller	(Germany) #410 rent2Drive-MEHRTEC-racing						3_{2}					(2)
—	(Spain) Carlos Arimon	(Germany) #396 Adrenalin Motorsport Team Mainhattan Wheels				C	2_{2}						(2)
—	(Italy) Stefano Croci (France) Joël Le Bihan	(Germany) #410 rent2Drive-MEHRTEC-racing				C	DNS						—
—	(Germany) Leo-Livius Arne Weber	(Germany) #410 rent2Drive-MEHRTEC-racing	C	WD									—
—	(Germany) Laurents Hörr	(Germany) #410 rent2Drive-MEHRTEC-racing	C										—
—	(Germany) Csaba Walter	(Germany) #410 rent2Drive-MEHRTEC-racing		WD									—
—	(Germany) Marco Vitonelli (Germany) Alexander Weber	(Germany) #410 rent2Drive-MEHRTEC-racing							WD				—
Pos.	Driver	Team	NLS1	NLS2	NLS3	24H-Q		NLS6	NLS7	NLS8	NLS9	NLS10	Points

===== V5 =====
Pos.	Driver	Team	NLS1	NLS2	NLS3	24H-Q		NLS6	NLS7	NLS8	NLS9	NLS10	Points
1	(Germany) Matthias Beckwermert (Germany) Philip Klinkmüller	(Germany) #447 tm-racing.org	C	3_{3}	2_{3}			1_{3}	1_{5}				14
1	(Germany) Matthias Beckwermert (Germany) Philip Klinkmüller	(Germany) #448 tm-racing.org				C	DNS						14
3	(Germany) Daniel Korn (Germany) Tobias Korn (Germany) Ulrich Korn	(Germany) #444 Adrenalin Motorsport Team Mainhattan Wheels	C	1_{6}	1_{4}	C	1_{2}	Ret	Ret				12
6	(Switzerland) David Ackermann (France) Jérôme Larbi	(Germany) #445 rent2Drive-MEHRTEC-racing			3_{2}								2
Non-championship entries
—	(Germany) Sebastian Brandl (Germany) Michael Schröder	(Germany) #446 tm-racing.org	C	2_{4}									(4)
—	(Sweden) Peter Baumann (Germany) Thorsten Held (Germany) Matthias Trinius	(Germany) #455 Pure Racing		4_{2}									(2)
—	(Germany) Happinessa (Germany) Leo-Livius Arne Weber	(Germany) #445 rent2Drive-MEHRTEC-racing			3_{2}								(2)
—	(Germany) Florian Layer (Germany) Andreas Müller (Germany) Florian Quante	#440 (Porsche Cayman)							Ret				—
Pos.	Driver	Team	NLS1	NLS2	NLS3	24H-Q		NLS6	NLS7	NLS8	NLS9	NLS10	Points

===== VT3 =====
Pos.	Driver	Team	NLS1	NLS2	NLS3	24H-Q	NLS6	NLS7	NLS8	NLS9	NLS10	Points
1	(Germany) Rudi Speich	(Germany) #59 MSC Sinzig e.V. im ADAC						1_{3}				3
Non-championship entries
—	(Germany) Dirk Vleugels (Germany) Roland Waschkau	(Germany) #59 MSC Sinzig e.V. im ADAC						1_{3}				(3)
Pos.	Driver	Team	NLS1	NLS2	NLS3	24H-Q	NLS6	NLS7	NLS8	NLS9	NLS10	Points

===== VT2-F+4WD =====
Pos.	Driver	Team	NLS1	NLS2	NLS3	24H-Q		NLS6	NLS7	NLS8	NLS9	NLS10	Points
1	(Germany) Marcel Unland (Germany) Markus Weinstock	(Germany) #470 Jung Motorsport	C	1_{15}	2_{11}	C	Ret	1_{15}	Ret				41
1	(Germany) Michael Eichhorn	(Germany) #470 Jung Motorsport	C	1_{15}	2_{11}	C	Ret	1_{15}	Ret				41 (51)
1	(Germany) Michael Eichhorn	(Germany) #472 Jung Motorsport							3_{10}‡				41 (51)
1	(Germany) Tobias Jung	(Germany) #470 Jung Motorsport	C	1_{15}	2_{11}	C	Ret	1_{15}	Ret				41 (51)
1	(Germany) Tobias Jung	(Germany) #472 Jung Motorsport	C	4_{6}‡	3_{8}‡				3_{10}‡				41 (51)
5	(Germany) Christoph Dupré (Germany) Joachim Nett (Germany) Jürgen Nett	(Germany) #480 Dupré Engineering	C	Ret	Ret	C	1_{15}	Ret	1_{19}				34
8	(Brazil) Flavia Pellegrino Fernandes (Germany) Thomas Schönfeld	(Germany) #494 FS Motorsport	C	2_{11}	Ret	C	3_{8}	NC	2_{14}				33
10	(Germany) Michael Bohrer (Germany) Pascal Otto Fritzsche	(Germany) #495 FS Motorsport	C	Ret	1_{15}	C	2_{11}	Ret	Ret				26
12	(Germany) Maximilian Simons	(Germany) #472 Jung Motorsport	C	4_{6}	3_{8}	C	5_{4}	Ret					18
13	(Germany) Ralf Wiesner	(Germany) #491 STENLE Marketing by Mertens Motorsport	C	Ret	Ret	C	6_{3}	3_{8}	6_{4}				15
14	(Germany) Richard Schäfer	(Germany) #491 STENLE Marketing by Mertens Motorsport	C	Ret	Ret	C	6_{3}		6_{4}				7
14	(Germany) Richard Schäfer	(Germany) #492 STENLE Marketing by Mertens Motorsport						Ret					7
15	(Germany) Nick Deißler	(Germany) #488 SRS Team Sorg Rennsport	C	3_{8}‡	4_{6}	C	Ret						6 (14)
Non-championship entries
—	(Germany) Lars Füting	(Germany) #472 Jung Motorsport	C	4_{6}	3_{8}	C	5_{4}	Ret	3_{10}				(28)
—	(United States) Jeff Ricca	(Germany) #491 STENLE Marketing by Mertens Motorsport	C		Ret	C	6_{3}	3_{8}	6_{4}				(22)
—	(United States) Jeff Ricca	(Germany) #492 STENLE Marketing by Mertens Motorsport							4_{8}				(22)
—	(United States) Jeff Ricca	(Germany) #496 STENLE Marketing by Mertens Motorsport				C	4_{6}						(22)
—	(Germany) Dennis Surace	(Germany) #494 FS Motorsport							2_{14}				(14)
—	(Germany) Daniel Alger	(Germany) #488 SRS Team Sorg Rennsport	C	3_{8}	4_{6}	C	NC						(14)
—	(Germany) Alex Schneider	(Germany) #477 asBest Racing						4_{6}					(14)
—	(Germany) Alex Schneider	(Germany) #494 FS Motorsport				C	3_{8}						(14)
—	(Germany) Alex Schneider	(Germany) #495 FS Motorsport							Ret				(14)
—	(Germany) Fabian Tillmann	(Germany) #474 Time Attack Paderborn by GTÜ Wieseler			5_{4}								(12)
—	(Germany) Fabian Tillmann	(Germany) #492 STENLE Marketing by Mertens Motorsport	C						4_{8}				(12)
—	(Germany) Tom Schütze	(Germany) #494 FS Motorsport	C	2_{11}	Ret								(11)
—	(Germany) Elias Funke (Germany) Andre Kern (Netherlands) Chris Rothoff	#471 (Cupra Leon)						2_{11}					(11)
—	(Germany) Sebastian Radermacher	(Germany) #477 asBest Racing						4_{6}	5_{5}				(11)
—	(Germany) Giancarlo-Gino Lührs	(Germany) #472 Jung Motorsport							3_{10}				(10)
—	(Puerto Rico) Carlos Jose Sepulveda Irizarry	(Germany) #492 STENLE Marketing by Mertens Motorsport	C		Ret								(9)
—	(Puerto Rico) Carlos Jose Sepulveda Irizarry	(Germany) #496 STENLE Marketing by Mertens Motorsport			6_{3}	C	4_{6}						(9)
—	(Germany) Eugen Weber	(Germany) #472 Jung Motorsport	C		3_{8}								(8)
—	(Belgium) Kobe Pauwels	(Germany) #488 SRS Team Sorg Rennsport		3_{8}									(8)
—	(Canada) Shelby Mills	(Germany) #492 STENLE Marketing by Mertens Motorsport	C						4_{8}				(8)
—	(Netherlands) Tijmen van der Helm	(Germany) #488 SRS Team Sorg Rennsport			4_{6}								(6)
—	(Germany) Thomas Mennecke	(Germany) #477 asBest Racing			DNS	C	WD		5_{5}				(5)
—	(Germany) Maximilian Kochendörfer	(Germany) #477 asBest Racing			DNS				5_{5}				(5)
—	(Thailand) Thanathip Thanalapanan	(Germany) #472 Jung Motorsport				C	5_{4}						(4)
—	(Switzerland) Boris Hrubesch (Germany) Michael Wolpertinger	(Germany) #474 Time Attack Paderborn by GTÜ Wieseler			5_{4}								(4)
—	(South Korea) Shin Woo-jin	(Germany) #492 STENLE Marketing by Mertens Motorsport	C		Ret								(3)
—	(South Korea) Shin Woo-jin	(Germany) #496 STENLE Marketing by Mertens Motorsport			6_{3}								(3)
—	(Germany) Sebastian Disch	(Germany) #494 FS Motorsport						NC					—
—	(Netherlands) Calvin de Groot	(Germany) #488 SRS Team Sorg Rennsport				C	Ret						—
—	(Germany) Christian Geilfus (Germany) Oliver Kriese	#481 (Renault Mégane RS)			Ret								—
—	(Germany) Yannick Bieniek (Germany) Tim Robertz	(Germany) #472 Jung Motorsport						Ret					—
—	(Germany) Christian Alexander Dannesberger (Germany) Niklas Walter	(Germany) #492 STENLE Marketing by Mertens Motorsport						Ret					—
—	(United States) Bastian Beck	(Germany) #477 asBest Racing	C										—
—	(Germany) Marc Etzkorn	(Germany) #472 Jung Motorsport				C	WD						—
—	(Germany) Christian Schier	(Germany) #477 asBest Racing				C	WD						—
Pos.	Driver	Team	NLS1	NLS2	NLS3	24H-Q		NLS6	NLS7	NLS8	NLS9	NLS10	Points

===== VT2-RWD =====
Pos.	Driver	Team	NLS1	NLS2	NLS3	24H-Q		NLS6	NLS7	NLS8	NLS9	NLS10	Points
1	(Germany) Philipp Leisen (Germany) Philipp Stahlschmidt (Germany) Daniel Zils	(Germany) #500 Adrenalin Motorsport Team Mainhattan Wheels	C	Ret	2_{11}	C	1_{15}	Ret	1_{19}				45
1	(Netherlands) Piet-Jan Ooms (Italy) Ionuc Catalin Timis	(Germany) #524 SRS Team Sorg Rennsport	C	1_{15}	1_{15}	C	Ret	1_{15}	Ret				45
6	(Japan) Takuma Miyazono	(Germany) #520 Toyo Tires with Ring Racing	C	8_{1}	5_{4}	C	5_{4}	2_{11}	2_{14}				34
7	(Israel) Hagay Farran (Israel) Moran Gott	(Germany) #55 Schmickler Performance powered by Ravenol	C	2_{11}	4_{6}	C	2_{11}	Ret	Ret				28
9	(Germany) Serge van Vooren	(Germany) #505 Keeevin Motorsport	C	9_{1}	9_{1}	C	DNS	Ret					2
10	(Germany) Matthias Aretz	(Germany) #505 Keeevin Motorsport	C		9_{1}	C	DNS	Ret					1
Non-championship entries
—	(Germany) Kurt Strube	(Germany) #514 SRS Team Sorg Rennsport	C			C	6_{3}	3_{8}	3_{10}				(21)
—	(Japan) Jin Horino	(Germany) #520 Toyo Tires with Ring Racing	C	8_{1}		C	5_{4}		2_{14}				(19)
—	(Germany) Manfred Röss (Germany) Matthias Röss (Germany) Malte Tack	#519 RAVENOL Japan			3_{8}	C	3_{8}						(16)
—	(United Kingdom) Tom Fleming	(Germany) #524 SRS Team Sorg Rennsport		1_{15}									(15)
—	(Austria) Kiano Blum	(Germany) #524 SRS Team Sorg Rennsport			1_{15}								(15)
—	(United Kingdom) Charlie Fagg	(Germany) #524 SRS Team Sorg Rennsport						1_{15}					(15)
—	(Japan) Masato Kawabata	(Germany) #520 Toyo Tires with Ring Racing	C			C	5_{4}	2_{11}					(15)
—	(Germany) Lars Duckek (Germany) Rainer Gelhaus (United States) Alejandro Gutierrez	(Germany) #514 SRS Team Sorg Rennsport							3_{10}				(10)
—	(South Korea) Lee Chang-uk (South Korea) Lee Jung-woo	(Germany) #514 SRS Team Sorg Rennsport		3_{8}									(8)
—	(Republic of Ireland) Jayden Kelly (Germany) Luciano Schneider	(Germany) #514 SRS Team Sorg Rennsport						3_{8}					(8)
—	(Germany) Harald Barth (Germany) Marcel Manheller (Germany) Markus Schiller	(Germany) #515 Manheller Racing							4_{8}				(8)
—	(Austria) Elena Egger	(Germany) #502 Giti Tire Motorsport by WS Racing			8_{1}								(7)
—	(Austria) Elena Egger	(Germany) #503 Giti Tire Motorsport by WS Racing	C	7_{2}		C	DNS						(7)
—	(Austria) Elena Egger	(Germany) #506 Giti Tire Motorsport by WS Racing						5_{4}					(7)
—	(Austria) Elena Egger	(Germany) #509 Giti Tire Motorsport by WS Racing							Ret				(7)
—	(Sweden) Siri Hökfelt	(Germany) #502 Giti Tire Motorsport by WS Racing			8_{1}								(7)
—	(Sweden) Siri Hökfelt	(Germany) #503 Giti Tire Motorsport by WS Racing	C	7_{2}		C	DNS						(7)
—	(Sweden) Siri Hökfelt	(Germany) #506 Giti Tire Motorsport by WS Racing						5_{4}					(7)
—	(Portugal) Guilherme Oliveira	(Germany) #510 Manheller Racing	C	4_{6}									(6)
—	(Argentina) Nano Lopez (Germany) Sub7BTG (Germany) Matthias Trinius	(Germany) #501 Adrenalin Motorsport Team Mainhattan Wheels				C	4_{6}						(6)
—	(Spain) Lluc Ibáñez (Spain) Nil Montserrat	(Germany) #510 Manheller Racing		4_{6}									(6)
—	(Germany) Christian Koch (Germany) Andreas Pöschko (Germany) Beat Schmitz (Germany) Andre Sommerberg	(Germany) #508 Speedbeat Motorsport						4_{6}	Ret				(6)
—	(Japan) Hideyuki Fujino	(Germany) #520 Toyo Tires with Ring Racing		8_{1}	5_{4}								(5)
—	(Germany) Niklas Ehrhardt (Germany) Thomas Ehrhardt (Germany) Fabian Pirrone	(Singapore) #502 Giti Tire Motorsport by WS Racing	C	5_{4}									(4)
—	(Germany) Niklas Ehrhardt (Germany) Thomas Ehrhardt (Germany) Fabian Pirrone	(Singapore) #503 Giti Tire Motorsport by WS Racing			Ret								(4)
—	(Germany) Helge Tamm	(Germany) #503 Giti Tire Motorsport by WS Racing				C	DNS						(4)
—	(Germany) Helge Tamm	(Germany) #506 Giti Tire Motorsport by WS Racing						5_{4}					(4)
—	(Germany) Helge Tamm	(Germany) #509 Giti Tire Motorsport by WS Racing							Ret				(4)
—	(Japan) Hokuto Matsuyama	(Germany) #520 Toyo Tires with Ring Racing			5_{4}								(4)
—	(Germany) Ingo Horst	(Germany) #506 Giti Tire Motorsport by WS Racing						5_{4}					(4)
—	(China) Lin Weixiong (China) Yang Haoyu	(Germany) #501 Adrenalin Motorsport Team Mainhattan Wheels	C	6_{3}									(3)
—	(Netherlands) Lin Hodenius	#522 (BMW 330i)	C		6_{3}								(3)
—	(Italy) Alberto Carobbio (Italy) Ugo Vicenzi	(Germany) #514 SRS Team Sorg Rennsport				C	6_{3}						(3)
—	(Germany) Philip Stern	#522 (BMW 330i)			6_{3}								(3)
—	(Kazakhstan) Alexandr Artemyev (Lithuania) Arunas Geciauskas (United Kingdom) Lars Viljoen	(Lithuania) #507 Juta Racing						6_{3}					(3)
—	(Estonia) Carmen Kraav	(Germany) #502 Giti Tire Motorsport by WS Racing			8_{1}								(3)
—	(Estonia) Carmen Kraav	(Germany) #503 Giti Tire Motorsport by WS Racing	C	7_{2}									(3)
—	(United Kingdom) Sandy Mitchell	(Germany) #510 Manheller Racing	C		7_{2}								(2)
—	(Germany) Max Reis	(Germany) #510 Manheller Racing			7_{2}								(2)
—	(Poland) Nikodem Silecki	(Germany) #505 Keeevin Motorsport	C	9_{1}									(1)
—	(Germany) Christoph Blümer	(Germany) #505 Keeevin Motorsport		9_{1}									(1)
—	(United Kingdom) Chloe Chong (Germany) Dennis Garbe (Germany) John Lee Schambony	(Germany) #506 Giti Tire Motorsport by WS Racing	C	10_{1}									(1)
—	(United States) Ren Messinger	(Germany) #501 Adrenalin Motorsport Team Mainhattan Wheels				C	NC						—
—	(Germany) Heinz-Jürgen Kroner	(Germany) #514 SRS Team Sorg Rennsport				C	NC						—
—	(United States) Rafael Torres	(Germany) #524 SRS Team Sorg Rennsport				C	Ret						—
—	(Germany) Thomas Plum	(Germany) #505 Keeevin Motorsport						Ret					—
—	(Germany) Tabea Jünger (Germany) Hubert Winzer	(Germany) #509 Giti Tire Motorsport by WS Racing							Ret				—
—	(Italy) Francesco Bugane	(Germany) #524 SRS Team Sorg Rennsport							Ret				—
—	(Germany) Christian Scherer (Germany) Andreas Schmidt	(Germany) #505 Keeevin Motorsport							Ret				—
—	(United Kingdom) Jake Hill	(Germany) #514 SRS Team Sorg Rennsport	C		DNS								—
—	(Netherlands) Tijmen van der Helm	(Germany) #514 SRS Team Sorg Rennsport	C		DNS								—
—	(Netherlands) Tijmen van der Helm	(Germany) #524 SRS Team Sorg Rennsport	C										—
—	(Germany) Axel Duffner	(Germany) #505 Keeevin Motorsport				C	DNS						—
—	(Netherlands) Lars van 't Veer (Germany) Benjamin Baller (Netherlands) Ralf Jaspers	#511 (BMW F30)			DNS								—
—	(United States) Adam Adelson (France) Bruno Spengler	(Germany) #514 SRS Team Sorg Rennsport			DNS								—
—	(United Kingdom) Harry King	(Germany) #501 Adrenalin Motorsport Team Mainhattan Wheels	C										—
—	(Australia) Campbell Nunn	(Germany) #514 SRS Team Sorg Rennsport	C										—
—	(United Kingdom) David Pittard	#522 (BMW 330i)	C										—
Pos.	Driver	Team	NLS1	NLS2	NLS3	24H-Q		NLS6	NLS7	NLS8	NLS9	NLS10	Points

===== BMW M240i =====
Pos.	Driver	Team	NLS1	NLS2	NLS3	24H-Q		NLS6	NLS7	NLS8	NLS9	NLS10	Points
1	(Italy) Edoardo Bugane (Germany) Sven Markert	(Germany) #650 Adrenalin Motorsport Team Mainhattan Wheels	C	1_{15}	1_{15}	C	1_{15}		1_{19}				79
1	(Italy) Edoardo Bugane (Germany) Sven Markert	(Germany) #651 Adrenalin Motorsport Team Mainhattan Wheels						1_{15}					79
1	(Germany) Yannick Fübrich	(Germany) #650 Adrenalin Motorsport Team Mainhattan Wheels		1_{15}	1_{15}	C	1_{15}		1_{19}				79
1	(Germany) Yannick Fübrich	(Germany) #651 Adrenalin Motorsport Team Mainhattan Wheels						1_{15}					79
4	(Germany) Tim Lukas Müller	(Germany) #650 Adrenalin Motorsport Team Mainhattan Wheels		1_{15}	1_{15}								45
4	(Germany) Tim Lukas Müller	(Germany) #651 Adrenalin Motorsport Team Mainhattan Wheels				C	Ret	1_{15}					45
5	(Germany) Benjamin Albers	(Germany) #650 Adrenalin Motorsport Team Mainhattan Wheels				C	1_{15}						37
5	(Germany) Benjamin Albers	(Germany) #651 Adrenalin Motorsport Team Mainhattan Wheels	C	2_{11}	2_{11}	C	Ret						37
6	(Argentina) Santiago Baztarrica (United States) Nico Silva	(Germany) #651 Adrenalin Motorsport Team Mainhattan Wheels	C	2_{11}	2_{11}	C	Ret						22
8	(Republic of Ireland) Aidan Mulready	(United Kingdom) #667 Breakell Racing	C	9_{1}	7_{2}			2_{11}	Ret				14
9	(Netherlands) Mark van der Snel	(Germany) #652 Adrenalin Motorsport Team Mainhattan Wheels	C	4_{6}									6
10	(Netherlands) John van der Sanden (Germany) Ulf Steffens	(Singapore) #665 Giti Tire Motorsport by WS Racing	C	10_{1}	Ret	C	Ret	5_{4}	Ret				5
Non-championship entries
—	(United Kingdom) Farquini (United Kingdom) Ben Pitch	(Germany) #653 Adrenalin Motorsport Team Mainhattan Wheels	C	5_{4}		C	2_{11}	4_{6}	4_{8}				(29)
—	(Netherlands) Filip Hoenjet	(Germany) #652 Adrenalin Motorsport Team Mainhattan Wheels						Ret					(23)
—	(Netherlands) Filip Hoenjet	(Germany) #664 Ganser Motorsport / Schmickler Performance powered by Ravenol	C		6_{3}	C	4_{6}		2_{14}				(23)
—	(Germany) Lars Harbeck	(Germany) #650 Adrenalin Motorsport Team Mainhattan Wheels						3_{8}					(23)
—	(Germany) Lars Harbeck	(Germany) #651 Adrenalin Motorsport Team Mainhattan Wheels							10_{1}				(23)
—	(Germany) Lars Harbeck	(Germany) #652 Adrenalin Motorsport Team Mainhattan Wheels			3_{8}	C	5_{4}						(23)
—	(Germany) Lars Harbeck	(Belgium) #658 JJ Motorsport		7_{2}									(23)
—	(Germany) Alboretto	(Germany) #653 Adrenalin Motorsport Team Mainhattan Wheels			4_{6}								(16)
—	(Germany) Alboretto	(Germany) #680 Up2Race							3_{10}				(16)
—	(Israel) Moran Gott	(Germany) #664 Ganser Motorsport / Schmickler Performance powered by Ravenol				C	NC		2_{14}				(14)
—	(Romania) Aldrin Opran	(Germany) #652 Adrenalin Motorsport Team Mainhattan Wheels	C	4_{6}	3_{8}								(14)
—	(Germany) Jannik Reinhard	(Germany) #680 Up2Race		6_{3}					3_{10}				(13)
—	(United Kingdom) Joshua Hislop	(United Kingdom) #667 Breakell Racing	C	9_{1}				2_{11}	Ret				(12)
—	(Germany) Maximilian Kurz (Germany) Riccardo Petrolo	(Germany) #669 Keeevin Motorsport		3_{8}	5_{4}								(12)
—	(United Kingdom) James Breakell	(United Kingdom) #667 Breakell Racing	C					2_{11}					(11)
—	(Belgium) Hakan Sari (Belgium) Recep Sari	(Belgium) #658 JJ Motorsport		7_{2}	8_{1}	C	3_{8}						(11)
—	(Switzerland) Jean-Luc D'Auria	(Germany) #680 Up2Race							3_{10}				(10)
—	(Germany) Sarah Ganser	(Germany) #664 Ganser Motorsport	C		6_{3}	C	4_{6}						(9)
—	(Argentina) Nano Lopez	(Germany) #650 Adrenalin Motorsport Team Mainhattan Wheels						3_{8}					(8)
—	(Argentina) Nano Lopez	(Germany) #652 Adrenalin Motorsport Team Mainhattan Wheels	C										(8)
—	(Germany) Loris Scheider	(Germany) #669 Keeevin Motorsport		3_{8}									(8)
—	(United Kingdom) Harry King	(Germany) #652 Adrenalin Motorsport Team Mainhattan Wheels			3_{8}								(8)
—	(Germany) Tim Tramnitz	(Germany) #650 Adrenalin Motorsport Team Mainhattan Wheels						3_{8}					(8)
—	(Israel) Hagay Farran	(Germany) #664 Ganser Motorsport				C	4_{6}						(6)
—	(Netherlands) Max van der Snel	(Germany) #652 Adrenalin Motorsport Team Mainhattan Wheels		4_{6}									(6)
—	(Belgium) Axel Soyez (Germany) Hermann Vortkamp	(Germany) #653 Adrenalin Motorsport Team Mainhattan Wheels			4_{6}								(6)
—	(Germany) Tom Kalender (Germany) Lennard Falk von Canal (Germany) Enrico Förderer (Germany) Cedric Fuchs	(Germany) #661 SR Motorsport by Schnitzelalm							5_{5}				(5)
—	(Germany) Jan Ullrich	(Singapore) #665 Giti Tire Motorsport by WS Racing	C	10_{1}	Ret	C	Ret	5_{4}					(5)
—	(Germany) Jan Ullrich	(Germany) #680 Up2Race						6_{3}					(5)
—	(Switzerland) Marco Grilli	(Germany) #677 asBest Racing	C	8_{1}	Ret	C	7_{2}	8_{1}	8_{1}				(5)
—	(United Kingdom) Oleg Kravets (France) Laurent Laparra	(Germany) #652 Adrenalin Motorsport Team Mainhattan Wheels				C	5_{4}						(4)
—	(United Kingdom) Christian Mansell (Netherlands) Remon Vos (Germany) Timo Rumpfkeil	(Germany) #662 Team Motopark							Ret				(4)
—	(United Kingdom) Christian Mansell (Netherlands) Remon Vos (Germany) Timo Rumpfkeil	(Germany) #663 Team Motopark							6_{4}				(4)
—	(Turkey) Zeynel Babacan	(Germany) #669 Keeevin Motorsport			5_{4}								(4)
—	(Sweden) Evald Holstad	(Germany) #680 Up2Race	C	6_{3}									(3)
—	(United Kingdom) Jamie Green	(Germany) #680 Up2Race		6_{3}									(3)
—	(Sweden) Andreas Andersson (Sweden) Andreas Nilsson (Sweden) Johan Nilsson	(Singapore) #680 Giti Tire Motorsport by WS Racing				C	6_{3}						(3)
—	(Germany) Ralf Bohn (Germany) Alfred Renauer	(Germany) #680 Up2Race						6_{3}					(3)
—	(Germany) Niklas Ehrhardt (Germany) Günther Hartwig (Germany) Bernd Kuepper	#666 (Ehrhardt, Hartwig & Kuepper)							7_{3}				(3)
—	(Switzerland) Thomas Alpiger	(Germany) #677 asBest Racing			Ret	C	7_{2}						(2)
—	(Dominican Republic) Pedro Zaiter	(United Kingdom) #667 Breakell Racing			7_{2}				Ret				(2)
—	(Switzerland) Michael Neuhauser (Germany) Sebastian Tauber	(Germany) #677 asBest Racing				C	7_{2}						(2)
—	(Switzerland) Andreas Simon	(United Kingdom) #667 Breakell Racing			7_{2}								(2)
—	(United Kingdom) Samuel Harrison (Finland) Mika Panu (Italy) Riccardo Tucci	(Germany) #670 Up2Race						7_{2}					(2)
—	(Germany) Tom Schütze (Germany) Sebastian Disch	(Germany) #677 asBest Racing							8_{1}				(1)
—	(United Kingdom) Karim Sekkat	(United Kingdom) #667 Breakell Racing		9_{1}									(1)
—	(Germany) Antoine Berberich Martini (Germany) Denny Berndt	(Germany) #660 Smyrlis Racing						9_{1}					(1)
—	(China) Lin Weixiong (China) Yang Haoyu	(Germany) #652 Adrenalin Motorsport Team Mainhattan Wheels							9_{1}				(1)
—	(Germany) Andreas Winkler (Germany) Sub7BTG (Sweden) Siri Hökfelt	(Germany) #651 Adrenalin Motorsport Team Mainhattan Wheels							10_{1}				(1)
—	(France) Grégoire Boutonnet	(Germany) #652 Adrenalin Motorsport Team Mainhattan Wheels				C	NC						—
—	(Germany) Markus Schiller (Canada) Parker Thompson	(Germany) #652 Adrenalin Motorsport Team Mainhattan Wheels						Ret					—
—	(United Kingdom) Adam Sharpe	(United Kingdom) #667 Breakell Racing							Ret				—
—	(Germany) Fabian Pirrone (Australia) Bart Horsten (United Kingdom) Matthew Higgens	(Singapore) #665 Giti Tire Motorsport by WS Racing							Ret				—
—	(France) Nicolas Markiewicz	(Singapore) #670 Giti Tire Motorsport by WS Racing	C		DNQ	C	DNS						—
—	(France) Valentin Belgy	(Singapore) #670 Giti Tire Motorsport by WS Racing	C			C	DNS						—
—	(Germany) Dennis Garbe	(Singapore) #670 Giti Tire Motorsport by WS Racing				C	DNS						—
—	(France) Adrien Paviot	(Singapore) #670 Giti Tire Motorsport by WS Racing	C		DNQ								—
Pos.	Driver	Team	NLS1	NLS2	NLS3	24H-Q		NLS6	NLS7	NLS8	NLS9	NLS10	Points

===== BMW M2 Racing =====
Pos.	Driver	Team	NLS1	NLS2	NLS3	24H-Q		NLS6	NLS7	NLS8	NLS9	NLS10	Points
1	(Switzerland) Ranko Mijatovic	(Switzerland) #888 Hofor Racing by Bonk Motorsport	C	1_{11}	1_{8}	C	1_{6}	5_{3}	1_{19}				47
2	(Germany) Michael Schrey	(Switzerland) #888 Hofor Racing by Bonk Motorsport	C	1_{11}	1_{8}	C	1_{6}		1_{19}				44
3	(Germany) Marc David Müller	(Germany) #877 Ravenol Motorsport	C	2_{8}	2_{6}			1_{11}	2_{14}				39
4	(Germany) Henrik Seibel	(Germany) #877 Ravenol Motorsport	C		2_{6}			1_{11}	2_{14}				31
5	(Germany) Benjamin Albers (Argentina) Santiago Baztarrica (United States) Nico Silva	(Germany) #870 Adrenalin Motorsport Team Mainhattan Wheels						2_{8}	3_{10}				18
8	(Germany) Maximilian Hill	(Germany) #878 SRS Team Sorg Rennsport		5_{3}	4_{3}	C	2_{4}	3_{6}	NC				16
9	(Belgium) Tim Peeters	(Germany) #878 SRS Team Sorg Rennsport	C	5_{3}	4_{3}	C	NC	3_{6}	NC				12
10	(Germany) Bennet Ehrl	(Germany) #898 Walkenhorst Motorsport	C	4_{4}		C	4_{2}	4_{4}					10
11	(Germany) Max Schlichenmeier	(Germany) #878 SRS Team Sorg Rennsport	C	5_{3}				3_{6}‡					3 (9)
Non-championship entries
—	(Netherlands) Maxime Oosten	(Germany) #877 Ravenol Motorsport		2_{8}									(8)
—	(Germany) Fabio Rauer (Finland) Benjamin Sylvestersson (Bulgaria) Alex Stefanov	(Germany) #875 FK Performance Motorsport							4_{8}				(8)
—	(Germany) Frank Anhorn	(Germany) #899 W&S Motorsport	C	3_{6}	5_{2}								(8)
—	(Germany) Daniel Alger	(Germany) #899 SRS Team Sorg Rennsport						6_{2}	5_{5}				(7)
—	(Germany) Tabea Jünger	(Germany) #878 SRS Team Sorg Rennsport	C		4_{3}	C	2_{4}						(7)
—	(Germany) Yanis Anhorn	(Germany) #899 W&S Motorsport	C	3_{6}									(6)
—	(Germany) Gina Jobes (Netherlands) Olivier Olthof (Italy) Andreas Mayrl	(Germany) #899 SRS Team Sorg Rennsport							5_{5}				(5)
—	(China) Zou Yunfeng	(Germany) #870 Adrenalin Motorsport Team Mainhattan Wheels		6_{2}		C	3_{3}						(5)
—	(Germany) Maxim Felix Dacher	(Germany) #898 Walkenhorst Motorsport		4_{4}		C	NC						(4)
—	(United States) Robby Foley (United States) Francis Selldorf	(Germany) #870 Adrenalin Motorsport Team Mainhattan Wheels			3_{4}								(4)
—	(Germany) Aaron Wenisch	(Germany) #878 SRS Team Sorg Rennsport				C	2_{4}						(4)
—	(Norway) Lars Erik Wogsted	(Germany) #898 Walkenhorst Motorsport						4_{4}					(4)
—	(China) Lin Weixiong (China) Yang Haoyu	(Germany) #870 Adrenalin Motorsport Team Mainhattan Wheels				C	3_{3}						(3)
—	(United States) Tazio Ottis (Germany) Hermann Vortkamp	(Germany) #898 Walkenhorst Motorsport				C	4_{2}						(2)
—	(China) Foo Kuk Cheung	(Germany) #870 Adrenalin Motorsport Team Mainhattan Wheels		6_{2}									(2)
—	(Luxembourg) Max Lamesch (Luxembourg) John Marechal	(Germany) #899 W&S Motorsport			5_{2}								(2)
—	(Germany) Mathias Baar (Italy) Sofia Necchi	(Germany) #899 SRS Team Sorg Rennsport						6_{2}					(2)
—	(United States) Johnny Huang (Italy) Max Mutschlechner	(Germany) #878 SRS Team Sorg Rennsport							NC				—
—	(Germany) Markus Eichele (Germany) Thomas Rackl (Germany) Linus Hahne	(Germany) #885 ME Motorsport							Ret				—
—	(Norway) Emil Christian Gjerdrum	(Germany) #898 Walkenhorst Motorsport	C										—
Pos.	Driver	Team	NLS1	NLS2	NLS3	24H-Q		NLS6	NLS7	NLS8	NLS9	NLS10	Points

===== BMW 325i Challenge =====
Pos.	Driver	Team	NLS1	NLS2	NLS3	24H-Q		NLS6	NLS7	NLS8	NLS9	NLS10	Points
1	(Germany) Paul Pensler	(Germany) #101 Spezzial Racing	C	1_{11}	Ret			2_{6}	1_{14}				31
2	(Germany) Oliver Frisse (Germany) Henning Hausmeier	(Germany) #100 EiFelkind Racing	C	Ret	2_{8}	C	1_{6}	1_{8}	3_{8}				30
4	(Germany) Jonas Spölgen	(Germany) #111 TEAM JSCompetition	C	2_{8}	Ret	C	DNS	Ret					12
4	(Germany) Jonas Spölgen	(Germany) #112 TEAM JSCompetition				C	2_{4}	Ret					12
5	(Sweden) Dan Berghult	(Germany) #121 Keeevin Motorsport	C	Ret	1_{11}	C	WD						11
5	(Finland) Juha Miettinen	(Germany) #121 Keeevin Motorsport	C	Ret	1_{11}	C^{†}							11
7	(Germany) Eugen Becker	(Germany) #111 TEAM JSCompetition	C	2_{8}	Ret	C	DNS	Ret					8
7	(Germany) Eugen Becker	(Germany) #112 TEAM JSCompetition						Ret					8
8	(Switzerland) Flurin Zimmermann	(Germany) #112 TEAM JSCompetition				C	2_{4}						4
Non-championship entries
—	(Germany) Fritz Hebig	(Germany) #101 Spezzial Racing	C	1_{11}	Ret			2_{6}	1_{14}				(31)
—	(Germany) Roman Schiemenz	(Germany) #108 asBest Racing			3_{6}								(16)
—	(Germany) Roman Schiemenz	(Germany) #120 (Schiemenz & Schöning)							2_{10}				(16)
—	(Germany) Dominik Schöning	(Germany) #120 (Schiemenz & Schöning)							2_{10}				(10)
—	(Germany) Philipp Weber	(Germany) #100 EiFelkind Racing							3_{8}				(8)
—	(Germany) Tim Schwolow	(Germany) #101 EiFelkind Racing				C	3_{3}						(7)
—	(Germany) Tim Schwolow	(Germany) #102 EiFelkind Racing						3_{4}					(7)
—	(Germany) Sven Schulte	(Germany) #101 EiFelkind Racing				C	3_{3}						(7)
—	(Germany) Sven Schulte	(Germany) #102 EiFelkind Racing							5_{4}				(7)
—	(Netherlands) Chris Rothoff	(Germany) #108 asBest Racing			3_{6}								(6)
—	(Austria) Michael Fischer	(Germany) #100 EiFelkind Racing	C	Ret		C	1_{6}						(6)
—	(Austria) Michael Fischer	(Germany) #102 EiFelkind Racing	C										(6)
—	(Germany) Florian Altschaffel (Germany) Jonas Krause (Germany) Edouard Martin	(Germany) #700 (BMW 325i Kombi)							4_{5}				(5)
—	(Germany) Nils Renkem	(Germany) #102 EiFelkind Racing		Ret					5_{4}				(4)
—	(Switzerland) Kevin Ott	(Germany) #112 TEAM JSCompetition				C	2_{4}						(4)
—	(Austria) Maximilian Vogl	(Germany) #102 EiFelkind Racing						3_{4}					(4)
—	(United States) Thomas Pendergrass	(Germany) #102 EiFelkind Racing							5_{4}				(4)
—	Vladimir Lobachev	(Germany) #101 EiFelkind Racing				C	3_{3}						(3)
—	(Germany) Christian Geilfus	(Germany) #112 TEAM JSCompetition				C	NC						—
—	(Germany) Heiko Weckenbrock	(Germany) #101 EiFelkind Racing				C	NC						—
—	(Germany) Jürgen Huber (Germany) Simon Sagmeister	(Germany) #112 rent2Drive-MEHRTEC-racing	C		Ret								—
—	(Germany) Andre Gehring (Germany) Robert Neumann	(Germany) #108 asBest Racing				C	Ret						—
—	(Germany) Anton Hahnenkamm (Germany) Michael Koch (Germany) Sascha Korte	(Germany) #108 asBest Racing		Ret									—
—	(Germany) Max Rosam	(Germany) #102 EiFelkind Racing		Ret									—
—	(Germany) Julia Ponkratz	(Germany) #112 TEAM JSCompetition						Ret					—
—	(Germany) Jens Schneider (Germany) Robin Reimer (Germany) Zoran Radulovic	(Germany) #108 asBest Racing							Ret				—
—	(United Kingdom) Sam Holman (United Kingdom) Stuart McLaren (Germany) Happinessa	(Germany) #112 rent2Drive-MEHRTEC-racing		DNS									—
—	(Germany) Bastian Beck	(Germany) #108 asBest Racing	C										—
Pos.	Driver	Team	NLS1	NLS2	NLS3	24H-Q		NLS6	NLS7	NLS8	NLS9	NLS10	Points

===== NLS CUP2 =====
Pos.	Driver	Team	NLS1	NLS2	NLS3	24H-Q		NLS6	NLS7	NLS8	NLS9	NLS10	Points
1	(Austria) Raphael Rennhofer	(Germany) #902 Team Liqui Moly by Black Falcon	C	1_{15}	Ret			2_{11}	2_{14}				55
1	(Austria) Raphael Rennhofer	(Germany) #920 Black Falcon				C	1_{15}						55
2	(United States) Ryan Harrison (Germany) Leon Wassertheurer	(Germany) #902 Team Liqui Moly by Black Falcon	C	1_{15}	Ret			2_{11}	2_{14}				40
4	(Germany) Alexander Hardt (Chile) Benjamín Hites (Germany) Benjamin Koslowski	(Germany) #900 Black Falcon Team Zimmermann	C	4_{6}	2_{11}			8_{1}	1_{19}				37
4	(Switzerland) Patrik Grütter	(Germany) #901 SRS Team Sorg Rennsport	C	5_{4}	1_{15}			3_{8}	3_{10}				37
8	(France) Joshua Bednarski	(Belgium) #904 Mühlner Motorsport				C	2_{11}		4_{8}				27
8	(France) Joshua Bednarski	(Belgium) #921 Mühlner Motorsport	C	3_{8}	Ret			Ret					27
9	(Germany) Robin Chrzanowski (Germany) Kersten Jodexnis (Germany) Richard-Sven Karl Jodexnis	(Germany) #919 Team Clickvers.de	C	7_{2}	6_{3}	C	4_{6}	4_{6}	5_{5}				22
12	(Germany) Tim Scheerbarth	(Belgium) #904 Mühlner Motorsport							4_{8}				16
12	(Germany) Tim Scheerbarth	(Belgium) #921 Mühlner Motorsport	C	3_{8}	Ret			Ret					16
13	(Germany) Peter Sander	(Germany) #909 Kkrämer Racing	C	6_{3}	Ret	C	3_{8}	5_{4}	Ret				15
14	(Germany) Ralf-Peter Bonk	(Germany) #906 pb performance		11_{1}	9_{1}	C	5_{4}	6_{3}	7_{3}				12
14	(Germany) Ralf-Peter Bonk	(Germany) #913 Team Cameron	C	9_{1}‡									12
15	(Germany) Alex Koch (Germany) Niklas Koch	(Germany) #910 Smyrlis Racing	C	8_{1}	4_{6}			9_{1}	Ret				8
15	(Germany) Klaus Koch	(Germany) #910 Smyrlis Racing		8_{1}	4_{6}			9_{1}	Ret				8
18	(Germany) Karsten Krämer	(Germany) #909 Kkrämer Racing	C	6_{3}	Ret	C	3_{8}‡	5_{4}	Ret				7 (15)
19	(Germany) Stefan Beyer (Austria) Bernhard Wagner	(Germany) #915 SRS Team Sorg Rennsport	C	10_{1}	10_{1}			NC	9_{1}				3
21	(Germany) Max Schlichenmeier	(Germany) #915 SRS Team Sorg Rennsport			10_{1}			NC	9_{1}				2
Non-championship entries
—	(Germany) Nico Bastian	(Belgium) #904 Mühlner Motorsport		2_{11}	3_{8}			1_{15}	4_{8}				(42)
—	(Germany) Fabio Grosse	(Germany) #901 SRS Team Sorg Rennsport	C	5_{4}	1_{15}			3_{8}	3_{10}				(37)
—	(Germany) Fabio Grosse	(Germany) #917 Up2Race		Ret									(37)
—	(Estonia) Martin Rump	(Belgium) #904 Mühlner Motorsport	C		3_{8}			1_{15}					(23)
—	(Germany) Noah Nagelsdiek	(Germany) #920 Black Falcon				C	1_{15}						(15)
—	(France) Leo Messenger	(Germany) #909 Kkrämer Racing	C	6_{3}	Ret	C	3_{8}	5_{4}					(15)
—	(Netherlands) Marco van Ramshorst	(Germany) #906 pb performance		11_{1}	9_{1}	C	5_{4}	6_{3}	7_{3}				(12)
—	(Netherlands) Flynt Schuring	(Belgium) #904 Mühlner Motorsport	C	2_{11}									(11)
—	(Germany) Arne Hoffmeister (Hungary) Csaba Walter	(Belgium) #904 Mühlner Motorsport				C	2_{11}						(11)
—	(Germany) Peter Scharmach	(Germany) #919 Team Clickvers.de				C	4_{6}		5_{5}				(11)
—	(United States) Ace Robey	(Germany) #909 Kkrämer Racing				C	3_{8}						(8)
—	(Ukraine) Ivan Peklin	(Belgium) #904 Mühlner Motorsport							4_{8}				(8)
—	(United Kingdom) Leonidas Karavasili (Germany) Jürgen Oehler	(Germany) #829 Smyrlis Racing			5_{4}								(4)
—	(Switzerland) Michelangelo Comazzi	(Germany) #909 Kkrämer Racing						5_{4}					(4)
—	(United States) Peter Ludwig (Germany) Manuel Metzger (Switzerland) "Sun Tzu"	(Germany) #920 AV Racing by Black Falcon							6^{4}				(4)
—	(Switzerland) Michael Kroll (Germany) Thomas Mühlenz (Germany) Alexander Prinz	(Switzerland) #908 Hofor Racing	C		11_{1}			7_{2}	8_{1}				(4)
—	(Germany) David Kiefer (Germany) Marius Kiefer (Germany) Stefan Kiefer (Austria) Luca Rettenbacher	(Germany) #95 Sante Royale Racing Team				C	6_{3}						(3)
—	(United States) Jaden Lander (United States) Jonathan Miller	(Germany) #925 Huber Motorsport			7_{2}	C	Ret						(2)
—	(United States) Jake Walker	(Germany) #925 Huber Motorsport			7_{2}								(2)
—	(Sweden) Niclas Jönsson (United States) Tracy Krohn	(Germany) #935 RPM Racing	C		8_{1}								(1)
—	(Switzerland) Chantal Prinz	(Switzerland) #908 Hofor Racing	C						8_{1}				(1)
—	(Germany) Bill Cameron	(Germany) #913 Team Cameron	C	9_{1}		C	WD	Ret	Ret				(1)
—	(Germany) Maximilian Hill	(Germany) #915 SRS Team Sorg Rennsport							9_{1}				(1)
—	(Germany) Jim Cameron	(Germany) #913 Team Cameron				C	WD	Ret	Ret				—
—	(Ukraine) Oleksiy Kikireshko	(Germany) #917 Up2Race	C	Ret									—
—	(Germany) Hans Wehrmann	(Germany) #925 Huber Motorsport				C	Ret						—
—	(Germany) Peter Terting	(Germany) #917 Up2Race		Ret									—
—	(Germany) Tim Heinemann	(Germany) #917 Up2Race	C										—
—	(Norway) Oskar Sandberg	(Germany) #910 Smyrlis Racing	C										—
Pos.	Driver	Team	NLS1	NLS2	NLS3	24H-Q		NLS6	NLS7	NLS8	NLS9	NLS10	Points

===== NLS CUP3 =====
Pos.	Driver	Team	NLS1	NLS2	NLS3	24H-Q		NLS6	NLS7	NLS8	NLS9	NLS10	Points
1	(Germany) Alexander Fielenbach	(Germany) #952 Smyrlis Racing	C										64
1	(Germany) Alexander Fielenbach	(Germany) #953 Smyrlis Racing		1_{15}	1_{15}	C	1_{15}	Ret	1_{19}				64
1	(Norway) Oskar Sandberg	(Germany) #953 Smyrlis Racing		1_{15}	1_{15}	C	1_{15}	Ret	1_{19}				64
3	(Germany) Moritz Oberheim (Germany) Lorenz Stegmann	(Germany) #962 W&S Motorsport	C	Ret	3_{8}			1_{15}	2_{14}				37
3	(Germany) Heiko Eichenberg	(Germany) #959 SRS Team Sorg Rennsport	C	2_{11}	2_{11}	C	2_{11}	Ret	6_{4}				37
6	(Netherlands) Calvin de Groot	(Germany) #959 SRS Team Sorg Rennsport	C	2_{11}	2_{11}			Ret	6_{4}				26
7	(Germany) Leonard Oehme (Germany) Moritz Oehme	(Germany) #944 9und11 Racing	C	5_{4}	5_{4}			2_{11}	7_{3}				22
7	(United Kingdom) Toby Goodman (Czech Republic) Michal Makes (Germany) Marius Rauer	(Germany) #961 W&S Motorsport	C	4_{6}	4_{6}			Ret	3_{10}				22
12	(Germany) Horst Baumann	(Germany) #950 Schmickler Performance powered by Ravenol	C	3_{8}	Ret			10_{1}	4_{8}				17
13	(Switzerland) Patrik Grütter	(Germany) #959 SRS Team Sorg Rennsport				C	2_{11}						11
13	(Germany) Adrian Rziczny	(Germany) #941 Adrenalin Motorsport Team Mainhattan Wheels	C	10_{1}	Ret	C	3_{8}	7_{2}	Ret				11
15	(Germany) Constantin Laube (Germany) Henry Lindloff	(Germany) #951 Smyrlis Racing	C	14_{1}	16_{1}			4_{6}	15_{1}				9
17	(Netherlands) Mark van der Snel	(Germany) #941 Adrenalin Motorsport Team Mainhattan Wheels				C	3_{8}						8
17	(Germany) Max Rosam	(Germany) #951 Smyrlis Racing			16_{1}			4_{6}	15_{1}				8
19	(Germany) Darian Donkel	(Germany) #949 SRS Team Sorg Rennsport	C	7_{2}	Ret			6_{3}	8_{1}				6
20	(Germany) Markus Nölken	(Thailand) #945 Renazzo Motorsport	C	15_{1}	10_{1}	C	7_{2}	12_{1}	Ret				5
21	(Germany) Nick Deißler	(Germany) #949 SRS Team Sorg Rennsport						6_{3}	8_{1}				4
21	(Germany) Ulrich Daniel Nölken	(Thailand) #945 Renazzo Motorsport	C	15_{1}		C	7_{2}	12_{1}	Ret				4
21	(Germany) Lion Düker (Germany) Christoph Krombach (Germany) Oliver Kunz	(Germany) #982 W&S Motorsport	C	9_{1}	9_{1}			8_{1}	9_{1}				4
21	(Germany) Christian Kraus (Norway) Peder Saltvedt	(Germany) #952 Smyrlis Racing	C	11_{1}	12_{1}			9_{1}	12_{1}				4
28	(Germany) Stefan Kruse	(Germany) #941 Adrenalin Motorsport Team Mainhattan Wheels	C	10_{1}	Ret			7_{2}	Ret				3
28	(Germany) David Vogt	(Germany) #941 Adrenalin Motorsport Team Mainhattan Wheels		10_{1}	Ret			7_{2}	Ret				3
28	(Germany) Maximilian Eisberg (Sweden) Tommy Graberg	(Germany) #969 SRS Team Sorg Rennsport	C	8_{1}	8_{1}			NC	16_{1}				3
32	(India) Akshay Gupta	(Germany) #949 SRS Team Sorg Rennsport	C	7_{2}	Ret								2
32	(Germany) Maximilian	(Germany) #979 SRS Team Sorg Rennsport	C	12_{1}	13_{1}								2
34	(Germany) Kim Berwanger	(Germany) #966 asBest Racing	C	Ret	Ret			Ret	11_{1}				1
34	(Germany) René Höber	(Germany) #966 asBest Racing		Ret	Ret			Ret	11_{1}				1
34	(Germany) Danny Brink	(Belgium) #999 Mühlner Motorsport							13_{1}				1
34	(Germany) Janina Schall	(Germany) #977 Team Extreme Racing							14_{1}				1
Non-championship entries
—	(Germany) Stefan Schmickler	(Germany) #950 Schmickler Performance powered by Ravenol	C	3_{8}	Ret			10_{1}	4_{8}				(17)
—	(Germany) Kai Riemer	(Germany) #950 Schmickler Performance powered by Ravenol		3_{8}	Ret			10_{1}	4_{8}				(17)
—	(Germany) Erik Braun (Germany) Arne Hoffmeister (Germany) Franz Linden	(Germany) #971 Speedworxx Automotive	C	6_{3}	6_{3}			5_{4}	5_{5}				(15)
—	(Germany) Fabio Grosse	(Germany) #959 SRS Team Sorg Rennsport				C	2_{11}						(11)
—	(Germany) Nick Wüstenhagen	(Germany) #977 Team Extreme Racing			7_{2}			3_{8}	14_{1}				(11)
—	(Germany) Finn Zulauf	(Germany) #962 W&S Motorsport	C	Ret	3_{8}								(8)
—	(Netherlands) Max van der Snel	(Germany) #941 Adrenalin Motorsport Team Mainhattan Wheels				C	3_{8}						(8)
—	(Germany) Sebastian Brandl (Germany) John Lee Schambony	(Germany) #977 Team Extreme Racing						3_{8}					(8)
—	(Germany) Axel Sartingen	(Germany) #939 Black Falcon	C		11_{1}	C	4_{6}						(8)
—	(Germany) Axel Sartingen	(Germany) #969 SRS Team Sorg Rennsport		8_{1}									(8)
—	(Germany) Nils Schwenk	(Germany) #939 Black Falcon	C		11_{1}	C	4_{6}						(7)
—	(Germany) Anton Ruf	(Germany) #939 Black Falcon				C	4_{6}						(6)
—	(Germany) Aaron Wenisch	(Germany) #949 SRS Team Sorg Rennsport	C	7_{2}	Ret			6_{3}	8_{1}				(6)
—	(Germany) Olaf Baunack (Germany) Marco Lamsouguer	(Germany) #978 Kkrämer Racing	C	13_{1}		C	5_{4}						(5)
—	(Germany) Michelangelo Comazzi (Germany) Guido Tönnessen	(Germany) #978 Kkrämer Racing				C	5_{4}						(4)
—	(United Kingdom) Karim Sekkat	(United Kingdom) #967 Breakell Racing			Ret	C	6_{3}						(3)
—	(United Kingdom) James Breakell (United Kingdom) Joshua Hislop	(United Kingdom) #967 Breakell Racing				C	6_{3}						(3)
—	(Germany) Moritz Wiskirchen	(Germany) #977 Team Extreme Racing			7_{2}				14_{1}				(3)
—	(Germany) Fabio Sacchi	(Germany) #977 Team Extreme Racing			7_{2}								(2)
—	(Netherlands) Simon van Roon	(Germany) #939 Black Falcon			11_{1}								(2)
—	(Netherlands) Simon van Roon	(Germany) #990 Max Kruse Racing							10_{1}				(2)
—	(Germany) Christoph Blümer	(Germany) #979 SRS Team Sorg Rennsport		12_{1}	13_{1}								(2)
—	(Canada) Maxwell Polzler	(Belgium) #999 Mühlner Motorsport				C	8_{1}						(1)
—	(Germany) Fidel Leib	(Germany) #952 Smyrlis Racing						9_{1}					(1)
—	(Germany) Alexander Meixner	(Thailand) #945 Renazzo Motorsport			10_{1}								(1)
—	(Netherlands) Rudy van Buren	(Germany) #990 Max Kruse Racing							10_{1}				(1)
—	(Germany) Jan-Niklas Stieler	(Germany) #966 asBest Racing	C	Ret	Ret			Ret	11_{1}				(1)
—	(United States) Scott Speed	(Belgium) #999 Mühlner Motorsport						11_{1}					(1)
—	(United States) Joshua Jacobs	(Germany) #979 SRS Team Sorg Rennsport	C	12_{1}									(1)
—	(Norway) Eirik Wenaas-Schei	(Germany) #952 Smyrlis Racing			12_{1}								(1)
—	(Germany) Jan Hendrik Heimbach	(Germany) #952 Smyrlis Racing							12_{1}				(1)
—	(Germany) Mario Handrick	(Germany) #978 Kkrämer Racing	C	13_{1}									(1)
—	(Canada) Damon Surzyshyn	(Germany) #979 SRS Team Sorg Rennsport			13_{1}								(1)
—	(Germany) Markus Bückle (Germany) Moritz Thomas Rosenbach	(Belgium) #999 Mühlner Motorsport							13_{1}				(1)
—	(United States) Adam Adelson	(Germany) #980 Lionspeed GP	C		14_{1}								(1)
—	(Germany) Hugo Schwarze	(Germany) #951 Smyrlis Racing		14_{1}									(1)
—	(France) Bruno Spengler	(Germany) #980 Lionspeed GP			14_{1}								(1)
—	(Dominican Republic) Joel Monegro (United Kingdom) Jake Hill	(Germany) #989 Lionspeed GP			15_{1}								(1)
—	(Germany) Sebastian Von Gartzen	(Germany) #969 SRS Team Sorg Rennsport						NC	16_{1}				(1)
—	(Germany) Jörg Barth (Germany) Sören Timm (Germany) Niklas Meisenzahl (Germany) Adrian Wolf	(Germany) #964 SRS Team Sorg Rennsport							17_{1}				(1)
—	(Switzerland) Marc Arn (Switzerland) Philipp Frommenwiler (Germany) Christoph Ruhrmann (Switzerland) Marcel Zimmermann	(Switzerland) #977 BSL Racing Team				C	Ret						—
—	(Australia) Yasser Shahin (Germany) Marco Seefried	(Germany) #960 Schmickler Performance powered by Ravenol			Ret								—
—	(United Kingdom) Pippa Mann (Venezuela) Javier Ripoll	(United Kingdom) #967 Breakell Racing			Ret								—
—	(Sweden) Gustav Bergström (Luxembourg) Timmo Mol	(Germany) #980 Lionspeed GP							Ret				—
—	(United States) Anthony McIntosh (United Kingdom) Ben Tuck	(Germany) #960 Schmickler Performance powered by Ravenol							Ret				—
—	(Germany) Frank Anhorn (Germany) Klaus Koch (Germany) Jürgen Oehler	(Germany) #953 Smyrlis Racing	C										—
—	(Germany) Paul Heinisch	(Germany) #951 Smyrlis Racing	C										—
—	(United Kingdom) Leonidas Karavasili	(Germany) #969 SRS Team Sorg Rennsport	C										—
—	(Germany) Karsten Krämer	(Germany) #978 Kkrämer Racing	C										—
—	(Germany) Markus Schmickler	(Germany) #950 Schmickler Performance powered by Ravenol	C										—
—	(Ukraine) Oleksandr Kosohov	(Belgium) #999 Mühlner Motorsport				DSQ							—
Pos.	Driver	Team	NLS1	NLS2	NLS3	24H-Q		NLS6	NLS7	NLS8	NLS9	NLS10	Points

=== Teams' Classifications ===
==== NLS Speed-Trophäe (Overall) ====
Displaying entries that has achieved top 20 finish and/or top 3 qualifying in at least 1 round.

Pos.	Team	Class	NLS1	NLS2	NLS3	24H-Q		NLS6	NLS7	NLS8	NLS9	NLS10	Points
1	(Germany) #77 Schubert Motorsport	SP9 Pro	C	11	1^{2}	C	6	2	2	1^{2}	Ret	3	183
2	(Germany) #48 48LOSCH Motorsport by Black Falcon	SP9 Pro-Am	C	3		C	Ret	3	3	6	3^{2}	5	140
3	(Germany) #17 Dunlop Motorsports	SP9 Pro	C	8		C	DNS	1		5	2^{3}	1	133
4	(Germany) #44 Falken Motorsports	SP9 Pro	C	2	DSQ	C	DNS	Ret^{3}		2	1^{1}	2^{3}	124
5	(Slovakia) #23 Gamota Racing	SP9 Pro-Am		15	6	C^{1}	13^{2}	7	37^{3}	12^{1}	5	6^{1}	107
6	(Germany) #80 Mercedes-AMG Team Ravenol	SP9 Pro	C	Ret		C	4		1^{1}	4			82
7	(Germany) #75 Max Kruse Racing	AT 1	C	22	5				Ret	3	11	4	77
8	(Germany) #5 Black Falcon Team EAE	SP9 Am		16	7	C	15	12	8	11	8		74
9	(Germany) #35 Walkenhorst Motorsport	SP9 Pro						5^{1}	NC			Ret	68
9	(Germany) #35 Walkenhorst Motorsport	SP9 Pro-Am	C	14		C	DNS			7	4		68
10	(Germany) #99 Rowe Racing	SP9 Pro	C	1		C	5						55
11	(Hong Kong) #47 KCMG	SP9 Pro		10	4^{1}	C^{3}	Ret	9^{2}		18	DNS		54
12	(Germany) #911 Manthey Racing EMA	SP9 Pro	C		2	C	3						53
13=	(Germany) #900 Black Falcon Team Zimmermann	CUP2	C	21	11			39	12	13	12	8	50
13=	(Belgium) #904 Mühlner Motorsport	CUP2	C	19	12	C	21	11	17	14	13	11	50
15	(Germany) #32 Toyo Tires with Ring Racing	SP9 Pro-Am	C	17	14	C	DNS	8	11	9	Ret	Ret	47
16=	(Thailand) #786 Renazzo Motorsport	SP9 Am	C	Ret	8			10	7	Ret		Ret	41
16=	(Germany) #901 SRS Team Sorg Rennsport	CUP2	C	24	10			17	16	16	10	16	41
18	(Germany) #130/84 Team ABT Sportsline	SP9 Pro	C	9		C	2						40
19	(Germany) #902 Team Liqui Moly by Black Falcon	CUP2	C	18	Ret			13	13	15	Ret	14	32
20	(Armenia) #4 Goroyan RT by Car Collection	SP9 Pro-Am	C		13	C	Ret		4				30
21	(Italy) #54 Dinamic GT	SP9 Pro	C	Ret		C	14			Ret	9		19
22	(Germany) #632 Black Falcon Team Fanatec	AT 2	C	28	15	C	22		20	Ret	15	17	17
23	(Austria) #7 Konrad Motorsport	SP9 Pro	C	7	Ret								16
23	(Austria) #7 Konrad Motorsport	SP9 Pro-Am				C	Ret						16
24	(Lithuania) #8 Juta Racing	SP9 Pro-Am						Ret					15
24	(Lithuania) #8 Juta Racing	SP9 Am	C	25		C	18		18	Ret		12	15
25	(Germany) #33 Kkrämer Racing	SP9 Pro-Am	C	Ret	Ret^{3}								13
25	(Germany) #33 Kkrämer Racing	SP9 Am						Ret		19	14	18	13
26	(Austria) #66 Reiter Engineering	SP-X		26	9								12
27	(Germany) #11 Max Kruse Racing	AT 1						18	15	20	20	Ret	11
28	(Germany) #37 PROsport-Racing	SP9 Am	C	37	33	C	24	14	22	Ret	19	Ret	9
29	(Germany) #64 HRT Ford Racing	SP9 Pro	C	13					9^{2}‡	Ret^{3}‡	6‡	10‡	8 (52)
30=	(Germany) #962 W&S Motorsport	CUP3	C	Ret	24			22	26	87	16	20	6
30=	(Germany) #953 Smyrlis Racing	CUP3		30	19	C	27	Ret	25	26	17	23	6
32	(Germany) #910 Smyrlis Racing	CUP2	C	33	17			42	Ret	25	55	Ret	4
33	(Germany) #50 équipe vitesse	SP9 Am				C	20	21	30	21	22	19	3
34=	(Germany) #19 Max Kruse Racing	AT 1		22	Ret				19	22	Ret		2
34=	(Germany) #176 PROsport-Racing	SP10	C	36	43	C	34	19	29	97		Ret	2
36=	(Germany) #959 SRS Team Sorg Rennsport	CUP3	C	34	20	C	30	Ret	38	Ret	23	24	1
36=	(Belgium) #921 Mühlner Motorsport	CUP2	C	20	Ret			Ret					1
36=	(Germany) #98 Rowe Racing	SP9 Pro	C	23^{3}									1
Non-championship entries
—	(Germany) #16 Scherer Sport PHX	SP9 Pro	C	6^{2}		C	1^{3}						(56)
—	(Germany) #26 PROsport-Racing Team Bilstein	SP9 Pro				C	10						(49)
—	(Germany) #26 PROsport-Racing Team Bilstein	SP9 Pro-Am						4	Ret			7	(49)
—	(Belgium) #123 Mühlner Motorsport	SP9 Pro-Am				C	11		6	10	Ret		(39)
—	(Germany) #65 HRT Ford Racing	SP9 Pro	C		3	C	12						(34)
—	(Germany) #65 HRT Ford Racing	SP9 Pro-Am		Ret									(34)
—	(Germany) #22 Car Collection Motorsport	SP9 Pro-Am								8	7		(30)
—	(South Korea) #30 Hankook Competition	SP9 Pro						6					(29)
—	(South Korea) #30 Hankook Competition	SP9 Pro-Am		Ret		C	16					15	(29)
—	(Japan) #45 Realize Kondo Racing with Rinaldi	SP9 Pro	C	4		C	Ret^{1}						(25)
—	(Germany) #81 Schubert Motorsport	SP-X	C	12		C	7						(25)
—	(Germany) #2 Team Joos Sportwagentechnik	SP9 Pro-Am										9	(23)
—	(Germany) #2 Team Joos Sportwagentechnik	SP9 Am							14	17	21		(23)
—	(Germany) #1 FK Performance Motorsport	SP9 Pro							5				(20)
—	(Germany) #1 FK Performance Motorsport	SP10									44		(20)
—	(Germany) #34 Walkenhorst Motorsport	SP9 Pro	C	5		C	Ret						(20)
—	(Germany) #11 Schnitzelalm Racing	SP9 Pro-Am				C^{2}	8						(16)
—	(Germany) #67 HRT Ford Racing	SP9 Pro				C	9						(12)
—	(Germany) #992 Manthey Racing	SP-Pro			Ret	C	WD		10				(11)
—	(Slovakia) #36 Gamota Racing	SP9 Am										13^{2}	(10)
—	(Germany) #6 SP Racing Cologne Schmickler Performance	SP9 Am						15	Ret	Ret			(6)
—	(Germany) #18 équipe vitesse	AT 1						16		Ret	22		(5)
—	(Lithuania) #9/71 Juta Racing	SP9 Pro-Am			16	C	Ret						(5)
—	(Denmark) #86 High Class Racing	SP9 Pro-Am				C	17						(4)
—	(Germany) #62 HWA Engineering Speed	SP-X			18	C	23						(3)
—	(Germany) #165 SR Motorsport by Schnitzelalm	SP10									18		(3)
—	(Netherlands) #3 Mercedes-AMG Team Verstappen Racing	SP9 Pro	C	DSQ^{1}		C	38						(3)
—	(Germany) #920 Black Falcon	CUP2				C	19		23				(2)
—	(Germany) #919 Team Clickvers.de	CUP2	C	32	22	C	26	20	21	30	40	21	(1)
Pos.	Team	Class	NLS1	NLS2	NLS3	24H-Q		NLS6	NLS7	NLS8	NLS9	NLS10	Points

==== KW-Team-Trophäe ====
===== SP9 Pro =====
Pos.	Team	NLS1	NLS2	NLS3	24H-Q		NLS6	NLS7	NLS8	NLS9	NLS10	Points
1	(Germany) #77 Schubert Motorsport	C	10	1	C	6	2	2	1	Ret	3	180
2	(Germany) #17 Dunlop Motorsports	C	7		C	DNS	1		4	2	1	136
3	(Germany) #44 Falken Motorsports	C	2	DSQ	C	DNS	Ret		2	1	2	119
4	(Germany) #80 Mercedes-AMG Team Ravenol	C	Ret		C	4		1	3			82
5	(Hong Kong) #47 KCMG		9	4	C	Ret	5		5	DNS		74
6	(Germany) #99 Rowe Racing	C	1		C	5						55
7	(Germany) #911 Manthey Racing EMA	C		2	C	3						53
8	(Germany) #130/84 Team ABT Sportsline	C	8		C	2						42
9	(Germany) #35 Walkenhorst Motorsport						3	NC			Ret	25
10	(Italy) #54 Dinamic GT	C	Ret		C	10‡			Ret	4		22 (33)
11	(Austria) #7 Konrad Motorsport	C	6	Ret								18
12	(Germany) #64 HRT Ford Racing	C	11					4‡	Ret	3‡	4‡	10 (79)
13	(Germany) #98 Rowe Racing	C	12									9
Non-championship entries
—	(Germany) #16 Scherer Sport PHX	C	5		C	1						(55)
—	(Germany) #65 HRT Ford Racing			3	C	9						(37)
—	(Japan) #45 Realize Kondo Racing with Rinaldi	C	3		C	Ret						(25)
—	(Germany) #1 FK Performance Motorsport							3				(25)
—	(Germany) #34 Walkenhorst Motorsport	C	4		C	Ret						(22)
—	(South Korea) #30 Hankook Competition						4					(22)
—	(Germany) #67 HRT Ford Racing				C	7						(16)
—	(Germany) #26 PROsport-Racing Team Bilstein				C	8						(14)
—	(Netherlands) #3 Mercedes-AMG Team Verstappen Racing	C	DSQ		C	11						(10)
—	(Germany) #69 Dörr Motorsport				C	Ret						—
Pos.	Team	NLS1	NLS2	NLS3	24H-Q		NLS6	NLS7	NLS8	NLS9	NLS10	Points

===== SP9 Pro-Am =====
Pos.	Team	NLS1	NLS2	NLS3	24H-Q		NLS6	NLS7	NLS8	NLS9	NLS10	Points
1	(Germany) #48 48LOSCH Motorsport by Black Falcon	C	1		C	Ret	1	1	1	1	1	210
2	(Slovakia) #23 Gamota Racing		3	1	C	3	3	6	6	3	2	199
3	(Germany) #32 Toyo Tires with Ring Racing	C	4	3	C	DNS	4	4	4	Ret	Ret	113
4	(Germany) #35 Walkenhorst Motorsport	C	2		C	DNS			2	2		84
5	(Armenia) #4 Goroyan RT by Car Collection	C		2	C	Ret		2				56
6	(Germany) #37 PROsport-Racing								Ret	5		20
7	(Germany) #33 Kkrämer Racing	C	Ret	DNS	C	6						18
8	(Italy) #54 Dinamic GT					10 (Note: Position from SP9 Pro class.)						11
Non-championship entries
—	(Belgium) #123 Mühlner Motorsport				C	2		3	5	Ret		(73)
—	(Germany) #26 PROsport-Racing Team Bilstein						2	Ret			3	(53)
—	(Germany) #22 Car Collection Motorsport								3	4		(47)
—	(South Korea) #30 Hankook Competition	C	Ret		C	4					5	(42)
—	(Germany) #11 Schnitzelalm Racing				C	1						(35)
—	(Lithuania) #9/71 Juta Racing			4	C	Ret						(22)
—	(Germany) #2 Team Joos Sportwagentechnik										4	(22)
—	(Denmark) #86 High Class Racing				C	5						(20)
—	(Germany) #25 Dörr Motorsport							5				(20)
—	(Germany) #14 Team-RaceIng								7	Ret		(16)
—	(Austria) #7 Konrad Motorsport				C	Ret					DSQ	—
—	(Germany) #65 HRT Ford Racing	C	Ret									—
—	(Germany) #18 Lionspeed GP				C	WD						—
—	(Germany) #39 Walkenhorst Motorsport				C	DNS						—
—	(Lithuania) #8 Juta Racing						Ret					—
—	(United States) #20 ERA Motorsport							Ret				—
—	(Germany) #21 SR Motorsport by Schnitzelalm										Ret	—
Pos.	Team	NLS1	NLS2	NLS3	24H-Q		NLS6	NLS7	NLS8	NLS9	NLS10	Points

===== SP9 Am =====
Pos.	Team	NLS1	NLS2	NLS3	24H-Q		NLS6	NLS7	NLS8	NLS9	NLS10	Points
1	(Germany) #5 Black Falcon Team EAE		1	1	C	1	2	2	1	1		231
2	(Germany) #50 équipe vitesse				C	3	5	6	4	4	4	129
3	(Germany) #37 PROsport-Racing	C	3	3	C	4	3	5			Ret	117
4	(Lithuania) #8 Juta Racing	C	2		C	2		4	Ret		1	113
5	(Thailand) #786 Renazzo Motorsport	C	Ret	2			1	1	Ret		Ret	98
5	(Germany) #33 Kkrämer Racing						Ret		3	2	3	78
Non-championship entries
—	(Germany) #2 Team Joos Sportwagentechnik							3	2	3		(78)
—	(Slovakia) #36 Gamota Racing										2	(28)
—	(Germany) #6 SP Racing Cologne Schmickler Performance						4	Ret	Ret			(22)
—	(Netherlands) #40 Koopman Racing			Ret								—
—	(Germany) #27 PROsport-Racing				C	DNS						—
—	(Germany) #36 Saugmotoren Motorsport				C	DNS						—
Pos.	Team	NLS1	NLS2	NLS3	24H-Q		NLS6	NLS7	NLS8	NLS9	NLS10	Points

===== SP10 =====
Pos.	Team	NLS1	NLS2	NLS3	24H-Q		NLS6	NLS7	NLS8	NLS9	NLS10	Points
1	(Germany) #177 AV Racing by Black Falcon	C	2	1	C	6	3	1	1	2	4	226
2	(Germany) #176 PROsport-Racing	C	1	3	C	3	1	2	6		Ret	166
3	(Switzerland) #189 Hofor Racing by Bonk Motorsport	C	5	4	C	7	4	7	Ret	9	6	126
4	(Germany) #180 AV Racing by Black Falcon	C	4	2	C	4			Ret	4	2	122
5	(Germany) #164 W&S Motorsport	C	7	7			Ret	5	4	8	7	104
6	(Germany) #155 Plusline Motorsport	C	3	Ret	C	8	Ret	Ret	3	6	5	102
Non-championship entries
—	(Germany) #170 Toyo Tires with Ring Racing	C	Ret		C	1	2		2	5	Ret	(111)
—	(Germany) #175 PROsport-Racing			6	C	11			5	10		(59)
—	(Switzerland) #190/188 Hofor Racing by Bonk Motorsport				C	2		3				(53)
—	(Germany) #174 PROsport-Racing			5							3	(45)
—	(Germany) #165 SR Motorsport by Schnitzelalm									1		(35)
—	(Romania) #166 Willi Motorsport										1	(35)
—	(Switzerland) #171 BSL Racing Team		6		C	9						(30)
—	(Germany) #181 PROsport-Racing									3		(25)
—	(Japan) #178/90 Toyota Racing United			8	C	10						(25)
—	(Germany) #718 Team75 Bernhard							4				(22)
—	(Germany) #145 Cerny Motorsport				C	5						(20)
—	(Germany) #191 Car Collection Motorsport							6				(18)
—	(Germany) #1 FK Performance Motorsport									7		(16)
—	(Germany) #181 SRS Team Sorg Rennsport	C	8									(14)
—	(Germany) #179 Jung Motorsport										8	(14)
—	#188 (Audi R8 LMS GT4 Evo)			9								(12)
—	(Germany) #181 Manthey Racing								NC			—
—	(Singapore) #646 Giti Tire Motorsport by WS Racing							Ret				—
Pos.	Team	NLS1	NLS2	NLS3	24H-Q		NLS6	NLS7	NLS8	NLS9	NLS10	Points

===== SP-X =====
Pos.	Team	NLS1	NLS2	NLS3	24H-Q		NLS6	NLS7	NLS8	NLS9	NLS10	Points
1	(Austria) #66 Reiter Engineering		2	1								63
Non-championship entries
—	(Germany) #81 Schubert Motorsport		1		C	1						(70)
—	(Germany) #62 HWA Engineering Speed			2	C	2						(56)
—	(Germany) #61 HWA Engineering Speed			Ret	C	3						(25)
Pos.	Team	NLS1	NLS2	NLS3	24H-Q		NLS6	NLS7	NLS8	NLS9	NLS10	Points

===== SP7 =====
Pos.	Team	NLS1	NLS2	NLS3	24H-Q		NLS6	NLS7	NLS8	NLS9	NLS10	Points
1	(Poland) #69 Apexwerk Racing	C	1									35
Non-championship entries
—	(Germany) #82 tm-racing.org	C	2	Ret	C	1	Ret					(63)
—	(Germany) #71 RPM Racing						Ret	2	1	Ret		(63)
—	(Germany) #72 W&S Motorsport							1	2			(63)
—	(Switzerland) #84 BSL Racing Team								3	1		(60)
—	(Germany) #420 Four Motors Bioconcept-Car				C	WD		3	5			(45)
—	(Germany) #70 asBest Racing	C									1	(35)
—	(Germany) #89 Up2Race			1								(35)
—	(Germany) #70 Team Motopark								4			(22)
—	(Austria) #91 Reiter Engineering				C	Ret						—
—	#169 (Porsche 718 Cayman GT4 RS Clubsport)							Ret				—
—	(Germany) #78 PROsport-Racing										Ret	—
Pos.	Team	NLS1	NLS2	NLS3	24H-Q		NLS6	NLS7	NLS8	NLS9	NLS10	Points

===== SP2T =====
Pos.	Team	NLS1	NLS2	NLS3	24H-Q		NLS6	NLS7	NLS8	NLS9	NLS10	Points
1	(Germany) #380 Bitter Motorsport		2	1	C	1		1	1		2	196
Non-championship entries
—	(Germany) #385 Ring Racing							2	3	1	1	(123)
—	(Germany) #381 Schumann Motorsport								2	2		(56)
—	(Japan) #109 Toyota Gazoo Rookie Racing	C	1									(35)
—	(Japan) #110 Toyota Gazoo Rookie Racing	C	3									(25)
Pos.	Team	NLS1	NLS2	NLS3	24H-Q		NLS6	NLS7	NLS8	NLS9	NLS10	Points

===== AT 1 =====
Pos.	Team	NLS1	NLS2	NLS3	24H-Q	NLS6	NLS7	NLS8	NLS9	NLS10	Points
1	(Germany) #75 Max Kruse Racing	C	2	1			Ret	1	1	1	168
2	(Germany) #11 Max Kruse Racing					2	1	2	2	Ret	119
3	(Germany) #19 Max Kruse Racing		1	Ret			2	3	Ret		88
Non-championship entries
—	(Germany) #18 équipe vitesse					1		Ret	3		(60)
Pos.	Team	NLS1	NLS2	NLS3	24H-Q	NLS6	NLS7	NLS8	NLS9	NLS10	Points

===== AT 2 =====
Pos.	Team	NLS1	NLS2	NLS3	24H-Q		NLS6	NLS7	NLS8	NLS9	NLS10	Points
1	(Germany) #632 Black Falcon Team Fanatec	C	1	1	C	1		1	Ret	1	1	210
2	(Singapore) #146 Giti Tire Motorsport by WS Racing	C	DNS	2	C	2						56
Non-championship entries
—	(Germany) #320 Four Motors Bioconcept-Car				C	WD						—
—	(Singapore) #640 Giti Tire Motorsport by WS Racing								DSQ	DNS		—
Pos.	Team	NLS1	NLS2	NLS3	24H-Q		NLS6	NLS7	NLS8	NLS9	NLS10	Points

===== TCR =====
Pos.	Team	NLS1	NLS2	NLS3	24H-Q		NLS6	NLS7	NLS8	NLS9	NLS10	Points
1	(Norway) #801 Møller Bil Motorsport		NC	1			1		Ret		1	105
Non-championship entries
—	(Latvia) #821 LV Racing			2				1	2	1	Ret	(126)
—	(Germany) #321 Sharky Racing								1	Ret		(35)
—	(Germany) #89 KMA-Racing				C	1						(35)
—	(Germany) #808 asBest Racing	C		3								(25)
—	(South Korea) #830 Hyundai Motorsport N				C	Ret						—
Pos.	Team	NLS1	NLS2	NLS3	24H-Q		NLS6	NLS7	NLS8	NLS9	NLS10	Points

===== V6 =====
Pos.	Team	NLS1	NLS2	NLS3	24H-Q		NLS6	NLS7	NLS8	NLS9	NLS10	Points
1	(Germany) #396 Adrenalin Motorsport Team Mainhattan Wheels	C	Ret	Ret	C	2	1	1			1	133
Non-championship entries
—	(Germany) #400 Schmickler Performance powered by Ravenol	C	1	1			2	2	1			(161)
—	(Germany) #416/415 Köppen Motorsport		2		C	1			2	1	3	(151)
—	(Germany) #410 rent2Drive-MEHRTEC-racing	C	WD		C	DNS	3	WD	Ret	3	4	(72)
—	(Germany) #415 (Porsche Cayman S)								NC	2	2	(56)
Pos.	Team	NLS1	NLS2	NLS3	24H-Q		NLS6	NLS7	NLS8	NLS9	NLS10	Points

===== V5 =====
Pos.	Team	NLS1	NLS2	NLS3	24H-Q		NLS6	NLS7	NLS8	NLS9	NLS10	Points
1	(Germany) #444 Adrenalin Motorsport Team Mainhattan Wheels	C	1	1	C	1	Ret	Ret	1	1	1	210
2	(Germany) #447 tm-racing.org	C	3	2			1	1	2	2	2	207
Non-championship entries
—	(Germany) #445 rent2Drive-MEHRTEC-racing			3					Ret	3	4	(72)
—	(Germany) #446 tm-racing.org	C	2								3	(53)
—	(Germany) #455 Pure Racing		4									(22)
—	#440 (Porsche Cayman)							Ret				—
—	(Germany) #448 tm-racing.org				C	DNS						—
Pos.	Team	NLS1	NLS2	NLS3	24H-Q		NLS6	NLS7	NLS8	NLS9	NLS10	Points

===== VT2-F+4WD =====
Pos.	Team	NLS1	NLS2	NLS3	24H-Q		NLS6	NLS7	NLS8	NLS9 (Note: Awaiting decision on protest)	NLS10	Points
1	(Germany) #470 Jung Motorsport	C	1	2	C	Ret	1	Ret	3	2	2	179
2	(Germany) #480 Dupré Engineering	C	Ret	Ret	C	1	Ret	1	1	NC	1	140
3	(Germany) #491 STENLE Marketing by Mertens Motorsport	C	Ret	Ret	C	6	3	6	Ret			61
Non-championship entries
—	(Germany) #472 Jung Motorsport	C	4	3	C	5	Ret	3	Ret	3	5	(137)
—	(Germany) #495 FS Motorsport	C	Ret	1	C	2	Ret	Ret	2	1	DSQ	(126)
—	(Germany) #494 FS Motorsport	C	2	Ret	C	3	NC	2	5	Ret	4	(123)
—	#471 (Cupra Leon)						2		4			(50)
—	(Germany) #492 STENLE Marketing by Mertens Motorsport	C		Ret			Ret	4		Ret	3	(47)
—	(Germany) #488 SRS Team Sorg Rennsport	C	3	4	C	Ret						(47)
—	(Germany) #477 asBest Racing	C		DNS	C	WD	4	5				(42)
—	(Germany) #496 STENLE Marketing by Mertens Motorsport			6	C	4						(40)
—	(Germany) #474 Time Attack Paderborn by GTÜ Wieseler			5								(20)
—	(Germany) #490 mathilda racing										6	(18)
—	(Germany) #481 Ollis Garage Racing			Ret					Ret			—
Pos.	Team	NLS1	NLS2	NLS3	24H-Q		NLS6	NLS7	NLS8	NLS9	NLS10	Points

===== VT2-RWD =====
Pos.	Team	NLS1	NLS2	NLS3	24H-Q		NLS6	NLS7	NLS8	NLS9	NLS10	Points
1	(Germany) #500 Adrenalin Motorsport Team Mainhattan Wheels	C	Ret	2	C	1	Ret	1	2	2	1	189
2	(Germany) #55 Schmickler Performance powered by Ravenol	C	2	4	C	2	Ret	Ret				78
3	(Germany) #505 Keeevin Motorsport	C	9	9	C	DNS	Ret	Ret	4	3	Ret	24
Non-championship entries
—	(Germany) #524 SRS Team Sorg Rennsport	C	1	1	C	Ret	1	Ret	1	1	2	(203)
—	(Germany) #520 Toyo Tires with Ring Racing	C	8	5	C	5	2	2	Ret	Ret	5	(130)
—	(Germany) #514 SRS Team Sorg Rennsport	C	3	DNS	C	6	3	3			4	(115)
—	(Germany) #515 Manheller Racing							4	3		3	(72)
—	(Singapore) #502 Giti Tire Motorsport by WS Racing	C	5	8						4		(56)
—	#519 RAVENOL Japan			3	C	3						(50)
—	(Germany) #501 Adrenalin Motorsport Team Mainhattan Wheels	C	6		C	4						(40)
—	(Germany) #510 Manheller Racing	C	4	7								(38)
—	(Germany) #506 Giti Tire Motorsport by WS Racing	C	10				5					(31)
—	(Germany) #508 Speedbeat Motorsport						4	Ret				(22)
—	#522 (BMW 330i)	C		6								(18)
—	(Lithuania) #507 Juta Racing						6					(18)
—	(Germany) #503 Giti Tire Motorsport by WS Racing	C	7	Ret	C	DNS					Ret	(16)
—	(Germany) #509 Giti Tire Motorsport by WS Racing							Ret	Ret			—
—	(Germany) #504 SRS Team Sorg Rennsport	C									Ret	—
—	#511 (BMW F30)			DNS								—
Pos.	Team	NLS1	NLS2	NLS3	24H-Q		NLS6	NLS7	NLS8	NLS9	NLS10	Points

===== BMW M240i =====
Pos.	Team	NLS1	NLS2	NLS3	24H-Q		NLS6	NLS7	NLS8	NLS9	NLS10	Points
1	(Germany) #650 Adrenalin Motorsport Team Mainhattan Wheels	C	1	1	C	1	3	1	1	Ret	1	235
2	(Germany) #651 Adrenalin Motorsport Team Mainhattan Wheels	C	2	2	C	Ret	1	10	7	Ret	10	129
3	(Germany) #652 Adrenalin Motorsport Team Mainhattan Wheels	C	4	3	C	5	Ret	9	NC	4	9	113
4	(United Kingdom) #667 Breakell Racing	C	9	7			2	Ret	3	3	7‡	106 (122)
5	(Singapore) #665 Giti Tire Motorsport by WS Racing	C	10	Ret	C	Ret	5	Ret	5	Ret	3	76
Non-championship entries
—	(Germany) #653 Adrenalin Motorsport Team Mainhattan Wheels	C	5	4	C	2	4	4	4	2	4	(186)
—	(Germany) #664 Ganser Motorsport / Schmickler Performance powered by Ravenol	C		6	C	4		2	2	1	2	(159)
—	(Germany) #677 asBest Racing	C	8	Ret	C	7	8	8	Ret	Ret	6	(76)
—	(Germany) #680 Up2Race	C	6				6	3				(61)
—	(Belgium) #658 JJ Motorsport		7	8	C	3						(55)
—	(Germany) #669 Keeevin Motorsport		3	5								(45)
—	(Germany) #661 SR Motorsport by Schnitzelalm							5	6			(38)
—	(Germany) #670 Up2Race						7		DSQ		5	(36)
—	#666 (No Entry Name)							7			8	(30)
—	(Singapore) #680 Giti Tire Motorsport by WS Racing				C	6						(18)
—	(Germany) #663 Team Motopark							6				(18)
—	(Germany) #660 Smyrlis Racing						9					(12)
—	(Germany) #662 Team Motopark							Ret				—
—	(Singapore) #670 Giti Tire Motorsport by WS Racing	C		WD	C	DNS						—
Pos.	Team	NLS1	NLS2	NLS3	24H-Q		NLS6	NLS7	NLS8	NLS9	NLS10	Points

===== BMW M2 Racing =====
Pos.	Team	NLS1	NLS2	NLS3	24H-Q		NLS6	NLS7	NLS8	NLS9	NLS10	Points
1	(Switzerland) #888 Hofor Racing by Bonk Motorsport	C	1	1	C	1	5	1	1	Ret	2	223
2	(Germany) #877 Ravenol Motorsport	C	2	2			1	2	2	2	1	210
3	(Germany) #878 SRS Team Sorg Rennsport	C	5	4	C	2	3	NC	3	3	Ret	145
4	(Germany) #898 Walkenhorst Motorsport	C	4		C	4	4		4	5		108
Non-championship entries
—	(Germany) #870 Adrenalin Motorsport Team Mainhattan Wheels		6	3	C	3	2	3	5	1	3	(201)
—	(Germany) #899 SRS Team Sorg Rennsport						6	5	6	4	Ret	(78)
—	(Germany) #899 W&S Motorsport	C	3	5								(45)
—	(Germany) #875 FK Performance Motorsport							4				(22)
—	(Germany) #871 FK Performance Motorsport								7			(16)
—	(Germany) #885 ME Motorsport							Ret				—
Pos.	Team	NLS1	NLS2	NLS3	24H-Q		NLS6	NLS7	NLS8	NLS9	NLS10	Points

===== BMW 325i Challenge =====
Pos.	Team	NLS1	NLS2	NLS3	24H-Q		NLS6	NLS7	NLS8	NLS9	NLS10	Points
1	(Germany) #100 EiFelkind Racing	C	Ret	2	C	1	1	3	1	1	1	228
2	(Germany) #111 TEAM JSCompetition	C	2	Ret	C	DNS	Ret					28
Non-championship entries
—	(Germany) #102 EiFelkind Racing	C	Ret				3	5	2	2	2	(129)
—	(Germany) #101 Spezzial Racing	C	1	Ret			2	1	Ret			(98)
—	(Germany) #108 asBest Racing	C	Ret	3	C	Ret		Ret			5	(45)
—	(Germany) #121 Keeevin Motorsport	C	Ret	1	C	WD						(35)
—	(Germany) #112 TEAM JSCompetition				C	2						(28)
—	#120 (Schiemenz & Schöning)							2				(28)
—	(Germany) #101 EiFelkind Racing				C	3						(25)
—	#124 (Bochen, Schlebusch & Wolpertinger)								3			(25)
—	(Germany) #122 Keeevin Motorsport										3	(25)
—	(Germany) #115 rent2Drive-MEHRTEC-racing	C		Ret					4			(22)
—	(Germany) #107 TEAM JSCompetition									Ret	4	(22)
—	#700 (Altschaffel, Krause & Martin)							4				(22)
—	(Germany) #112 rent2Drive-MEHRTEC-racing		DNS				Ret		Ret			—
Pos.	Team	NLS1	NLS2	NLS3	24H-Q		NLS6	NLS7	NLS8	NLS9	NLS10	Points

=== Porsche Endurance Trophy Nürburgring ===
==== Drivers' Standings ====
===== CUP2 =====
Pos.	Driver	Team	NLS1	NLS2	NLS3	24H-Q		NLS6	NLS7	NLS8	NLS9	NLS10	Points
1	(Germany) Nico Bastian	(Belgium) #904 Mühlner Motorsport		2	3			1	4				73.5
2	(Switzerland) Patrik Grütter	(Germany) #901 SRS Team Sorg Rennsport	C	5	1			3	3				69.5
2	(Germany) Fabio Grosse	(Germany) #901 SRS Team Sorg Rennsport	C	5	1			3	3				69.5
2	(Germany) Fabio Grosse	(Germany) #917 Up2Race		Ret									69.5
3	(Germany) Alexander Hardt (Chile) Benjamín Hites (Germany) Benjamin Koslowski	(Germany) #900 Black Falcon Team Zimmermann	C	4	2			8	1				69
4	(United States) Ryan Harrison (Germany) Leon Wassertheurer	(Germany) #902 Team Liqui Moly by Black Falcon	C	1	Ret			2	2				65.5
4	(Austria) Raphael Rennhofer	(Germany) #902 Team Liqui Moly by Black Falcon	C	1	Ret			2	2				65.5
4	(Austria) Raphael Rennhofer	(Germany) #920 Black Falcon				C	1						65.5
5	(Germany) Robin Chrzanowski (Germany) Kersten Jodexnis (Germany) Richard-Sven Karl Jodexnis	(Germany) #919 Team Clickvers.de	C	7	6	C	4	4					49.5
6	(Germany) Ralf-Peter Bonk	(Germany) #906 pb performance		11	9	C	5	6	7				40
6	(Germany) Ralf-Peter Bonk	(Germany) #913 Team Cameron	C	9‡									40
6	(Netherlands) Marco van Ramshorst	(Germany) #906 pb performance		11	9	C	5	6	7				40
7	(Estonia) Martin Rump	(Belgium) #904 Mühlner Motorsport	C		3			1					36
8	(France) Joshua Bednarski	(Belgium) #904 Mühlner Motorsport				C	2		4				35.5
8	(France) Joshua Bednarski	(Belgium) #921 Mühlner Motorsport	C	3	Ret			Ret					35.5
8	(Germany) Tim Scheerbarth	(Belgium) #904 Mühlner Motorsport							4				35.5
8	(Germany) Tim Scheerbarth	(Belgium) #921 Mühlner Motorsport	C	3	Ret			Ret					35.5
9	(Switzerland) Michael Kroll (Germany) Thomas Mühlenz (Germany) Alexander Prinz	(Switzerland) #908 Hofor Racing	C		11			7	8				30.5
10	(Germany) Alex Koch (Germany) Niklas Koch	(Germany) #910 Smyrlis Racing	C	8	4			9	Ret				28
10	(Germany) Klaus Koch	(Germany) #910 Smyrlis Racing		8	4			9	Ret				28
11	(Germany) Stefan Beyer (Austria) Bernhard Wagner	(Germany) #915 SRS Team Sorg Rennsport	C	10	10			NC	9				27
12	(Germany) Max Schlichenmeier	(Germany) #915 SRS Team Sorg Rennsport			10			NC	9				21
13	(Germany) Karsten Krämer (Germany) Peter Sander	(Germany) #909 Kkrämer Racing	C	6	Ret	C	3	5	Ret				21
13	(France) Leo Messenger	(Germany) #909 Kkrämer Racing	C	6	Ret	C	3	5					21
14	(Ukraine) Ivan Peklin	(Belgium) #904 Mühlner Motorsport							4				19.5
15	(Netherlands) Flynt Schuring	(Belgium) #904 Mühlner Motorsport	C	2									18
16	(Germany) Peter Scharmach	(Germany) #919 Team Clickvers.de				C	4		5				16.5
17	(Switzerland) Chantal Prinz	(Switzerland) #908 Hofor Racing	C						8				13.5
18	(Germany) Maximilian Hill	(Germany) #915 SRS Team Sorg Rennsport							9				12
19	(Switzerland) Michelangelo Comazzi	(Germany) #909 Kkrämer Racing						5					11
20	(Germany) Torsten Kratz	(Switzerland) #908 Hofor Racing			11								8
21	(Germany) Bill Cameron	(Germany) #913 Team Cameron	C	9		C	WD	Ret	Ret				7
—	(Germany) Jim Cameron	(Germany) #913 Team Cameron				C	WD	Ret	Ret				—
—	(Ukraine) Oleksiy Kikireshko	(Germany) #917 Up2Race	C	Ret									—
—	(Germany) Peter Terting	(Germany) #917 Up2Race		Ret									—
—	(Germany) Tim Heinemann	(Germany) #917 Up2Race	C										—
Non-championship entries
—	(Germany) Noah Nagelsdiek	(Germany) #920 Black Falcon				C	1						—
—	(Germany) Arne Hoffmeister (Hungary) Csaba Walter	(Belgium) #904 Mühlner Motorsport				C	2						—
—	(United States) Ace Robey	(Germany) #909 Kkrämer Racing				C	3						—
—	(United Kingdom) Leonidas Karavasili (Germany) Jürgen Oehler	(Germany) #829 Smyrlis Racing			5								—
—	(Germany) David Kiefer (Germany) Marius Kiefer (Germany) Stefan Kiefer (Austria) Luca Rettenbacher	(Germany) #95 Sante Royale Racing Team				C	6						—
—	(United States) Peter Ludwig (Germany) Manuel Metzger (Switzerland) "Sun Tzu"	(Germany) #920 AV Racing by Black Falcon							6				—
—	(United States) Jaden Lander (United States) Jonathan Miller	(Germany) #925 Huber Motorsport			7	C	Ret						—
—	(United States) Jake Walker	(Germany) #925 Huber Motorsport			7								—
—	(Sweden) Niclas Jönsson (United States) Tracy Krohn	(Germany) #935 RPM Racing	C		8								—
—	(Germany) Hans Wehrmann	(Germany) #925 Huber Motorsport				C	Ret						—
—	(Norway) Oskar Sandberg	(Germany) #910 Smyrlis Racing	C										—
Pos.	Driver	Team	NLS1	NLS2	NLS3	24H-Q		NLS6	NLS7	NLS8	NLS9	NLS10	Points

===== CUP3 =====
Pos.	Driver	Team	NLS1	NLS2	NLS3	24H-Q		NLS6	NLS7	NLS8	NLS9	NLS10	Points
1	(Germany) Alexander Fielenbach	(Germany) #952 Smyrlis Racing	C										70
1	(Germany) Alexander Fielenbach	(Germany) #953 Smyrlis Racing		1	1	C	1	Ret	1				70
1	(Norway) Oskar Sandberg	(Germany) #953 Smyrlis Racing		1	1	C	1	Ret	1				70
2	(Germany) Moritz Oberheim (Germany) Lorenz Stegmann	(Germany) #962 W&S Motorsport	C	Ret	3			1	2				66.5
3	(Germany) Leonard Oehme (Germany) Moritz Oehme	(Germany) #944 9und11 Racing	C	5	5			2	7				52.5
4	(Germany) Heiko Eichenberg	(Germany) #959 SRS Team Sorg Rennsport	C	2	2	C	2	Ret	6				50
4	(Netherlands) Calvin de Groot	(Germany) #959 SRS Team Sorg Rennsport	C	2	2			Ret	6				50
5	(United Kingdom) Toby Goodman (Czech Republic) Michal Makes (Germany) Marius Rauer	(Germany) #961 W&S Motorsport	C	4	4			Ret	3				48.5
6	(Germany) Erik Braun (Germany) Arne Hoffmeister (Germany) Franz Linden	(Germany) #971 Speedworxx Automotive	C	6	6			5	5				48.5
7	(Germany) Horst Baumann (Germany) Stefan Schmickler	(Germany) #950 Schmickler Performance powered by Ravenol	C	3	Ret			10	4				40.5
7	(Germany) Kai Riemer	(Germany) #950 Schmickler Performance powered by Ravenol		3	Ret			10	4				40.5
8	(Germany) Lion Düker (Germany) Christoph Krombach (Germany) Oliver Kunz	(Germany) #982 W&S Motorsport	C	9	9			8	9				32.5
9	(Germany) Darian Donkel (Germany) Aaron Wenisch	(Germany) #949 SRS Team Sorg Rennsport	C	7	Ret			6	8				31
10	(Germany) Nick Wüstenhagen	(Germany) #977 Team Extreme Racing			7			3	14				30
11	(Germany) Christian Kraus (Norway) Peder Saltvedt	(Germany) #952 Smyrlis Racing	C	11	12			9	12				24.5
12	(Germany) Constantin Laube (Germany) Henry Lindloff	(Germany) #951 Smyrlis Racing	C	14	16			4	15				23.5
13	(Germany) Nick Deißler	(Germany) #949 SRS Team Sorg Rennsport						6	8				22
14	(Germany) Max Rosam	(Germany) #951 Smyrlis Racing			16			4	15				20.5
15	(Germany) Maximilian Eisberg (Sweden) Tommy Graberg	(Germany) #969 SRS Team Sorg Rennsport	C	8	8			NC	16				19
16	(Germany) Finn Zulauf	(Germany) #962 W&S Motorsport	C	Ret	3								18
17	(Germany) Sebastian Brandl (Germany) John Lee Schambony	(Germany) #977 Team Extreme Racing						3					15
18	(Germany) Adrian Rziczny	(Germany) #941 Adrenalin Motorsport Team Mainhattan Wheels	C	10	Ret	C	3	7	Ret				15
18	(Germany) Stefan Kruse	(Germany) #941 Adrenalin Motorsport Team Mainhattan Wheels	C	10	Ret			7	Ret				15
18	(Germany) David Vogt	(Germany) #941 Adrenalin Motorsport Team Mainhattan Wheels		10	Ret			7	Ret				15
18	(Germany) Moritz Wiskirchen	(Germany) #977 Team Extreme Racing			7				14				15
19	(Germany) Markus Nölken	(Thailand) #945 Renazzo Motorsport	C	15	10	C	7	12	Ret				13
20	(India) Akshay Gupta	(Germany) #949 SRS Team Sorg Rennsport	C	7	Ret								9
20	(Germany) Fabio Sacchi	(Germany) #977 Team Extreme Racing			7								9
20	(Germany) Kim Berwanger (Germany) Jan-Niklas Stieler	(Germany) #966 asBest Racing	C	Ret	Ret			Ret	11				9
20	(Germany) René Höber	(Germany) #966 asBest Racing		Ret	Ret			Ret	11				9
21	(Germany) Axel Sartingen	(Germany) #939 Black Falcon	C		11‡	C	4						8
21	(Germany) Axel Sartingen	(Germany) #969 SRS Team Sorg Rennsport		8									8
22	(Germany) Maximilian	(Germany) #979 SRS Team Sorg Rennsport	C	12	13								8
22	(Germany) Christoph Blümer	(Germany) #979 SRS Team Sorg Rennsport		12	13								8
23	(Germany) Jan Hendrik Heimbach	(Germany) #952 Smyrlis Racing							12				7.5
24	(Germany) Fidel Leib	(Germany) #952 Smyrlis Racing						9					7
25	(Germany) Ulrich Daniel Nölken	(Thailand) #945 Renazzo Motorsport	C	15		C	7	12	Ret				7
26	(Germany) Alexander Meixner	(Thailand) #945 Renazzo Motorsport			10								6
26	(Germany) Janina Schall	(Germany) #977 Team Extreme Racing							14				6
27	(Norway) Eirik Wenaas-Schei	(Germany) #952 Smyrlis Racing			12								5
28	(United States) Joshua Jacobs	(Germany) #979 SRS Team Sorg Rennsport	C	12									4
28	(Canada) Damon Surzyshyn	(Germany) #979 SRS Team Sorg Rennsport			13								4
29	(Germany) Hugo Schwarze	(Germany) #951 Smyrlis Racing		14									3
29	(Germany) Sebastian Von Gartzen	(Germany) #969 SRS Team Sorg Rennsport						NC	16				3
—	(United Kingdom) Karim Sekkat	(United Kingdom) #967 Breakell Racing			Ret	C	6						—
—	(United Kingdom) Pippa Mann (Venezuela) Javier Ripoll	(United Kingdom) #967 Breakell Racing			Ret								—
Non-championship entries
—	(Germany) Fabio Grosse (Switzerland) Patrik Grütter	(Germany) #959 SRS Team Sorg Rennsport				C	2						—
—	(Netherlands) Mark van der Snel (Netherlands) Max van der Snel	(Germany) #941 Adrenalin Motorsport Team Mainhattan Wheels				C	3						—
—	(Germany) Nils Schwenk	(Germany) #939 Black Falcon	C		11	C	4						—
—	(Germany) Anton Ruf	(Germany) #939 Black Falcon				C	4						—
—	(Germany) Olaf Baunack (Germany) Marco Lamsouguer	(Germany) #978 Kkrämer Racing	C	13		C	5						—
—	(Germany) Michelangelo Comazzi (Germany) Guido Tönnessen	(Germany) #978 Kkrämer Racing				C	5						—
—	(United Kingdom) James Breakell (United Kingdom) Joshua Hislop	(United Kingdom) #967 Breakell Racing				C	6						—
—	(Canada) Maxwell Polzler	(Belgium) #999 Mühlner Motorsport				C	8						—
—	(Netherlands) Rudy van Buren	(Germany) #990 Max Kruse Racing				10							—
—	(Netherlands) Simon van Roon	(Germany) #939 Black Falcon			11								—
—	(Netherlands) Simon van Roon	(Germany) #990 Max Kruse Racing				10							—
—	(United States) Scott Speed	(Belgium) #999 Mühlner Motorsport						11					—
—	(Germany) Mario Handrick	(Germany) #978 Kkrämer Racing	C	13									—
—	(Germany) Danny Brink (Germany) Markus Bückle (Germany) Moritz Thomas Rosenbach	(Belgium) #999 Mühlner Motorsport							13				—
—	(United States) Adam Adelson	(Germany) #980 Lionspeed GP	C		14								—
—	(France) Bruno Spengler	(Germany) #980 Lionspeed GP			14								—
—	(Dominican Republic) Joel Monegro (United Kingdom) Jake Hill	(Germany) #989 Lionspeed GP			15								—
—	(Germany) Jörg Barth (Germany) Sören Timm (Germany) Niklas Meisenzahl (Germany) Adrian Wolf	(Germany) #964 SRS Team Sorg Rennsport							17				—
—	(Australia) Yasser Shahin (Germany) Marco Seefried	(Germany) #960 Schmickler Performance powered by Ravenol			Ret								—
—	(Switzerland) Marc Arn (Switzerland) Philipp Frommenwiler (Germany) Christoph Ruhrmann (Switzerland) Marcel Zimmermann	(Switzerland) #977 BSL Racing Team				C	Ret						—
—	(Germany) Frank Anhorn (Germany) Klaus Koch (Germany) Jürgen Oehler	(Germany) #953 Smyrlis Racing	C										—
—	(Germany) Paul Heinisch	(Germany) #951 Smyrlis Racing	C										—
—	(United Kingdom) Leonidas Karavasili	(Germany) #969 SRS Team Sorg Rennsport	C										—
—	(Germany) Karsten Krämer	(Germany) #978 Kkrämer Racing	C										—
—	(Germany) Markus Schmickler	(Germany) #950 Schmickler Performance powered by Ravenol	C										—
—	(Ukraine) Oleksandr Kosohov	(Belgium) #999 Mühlner Motorsport				DSQ							—
Pos.	Driver	Team	NLS1	NLS2	NLS3	24H-Q		NLS6	NLS7	NLS8	NLS9	NLS10	Points

==== Teams' Standings ====
===== CUP2 =====
Pos.	Team	NLS1	NLS2	NLS3	24H-Q		NLS6	NLS7	NLS8	NLS9	NLS10	Points
1	(Belgium) #904 Mühlner Motorsport	C	2	3	C	2	1	4				73.5
2	(Germany) #901 SRS Team Sorg Rennsport	C	5	1			3	3				69.5
3	(Germany) #900 Black Falcon Team Zimmermann	C	4	2			8	1				69
4	(Germany) #902 Team Liqui Moly by Black Falcon	C	1	Ret			2	2				65.5
5	(Germany) #919 Team Clickvers.de	C	7	6	C	4	4	5				49.5
6	(Germany) #906 pb performance		11	9	C	5	6	7				40
7	(Switzerland) #908 Hofor Racing	C		11			7	8				30.5
8	(Germany) #910 Smyrlis Racing	C	8	4			9	Ret				28
9	(Germany) #915 SRS Team Sorg Rennsport	C	10	10			NC	9				27
10	(Germany) #909 Kkrämer Racing	C	6	Ret	C	3	5	Ret				21
11	(Belgium) #921 Mühlner Motorsport	C	3	Ret			Ret					16
12	(United Kingdom) #913 Team Cameron	C	9		C	WD	Ret	Ret				7
—	(Germany) #917 Up2Race	C	Ret									—
Non-championship entries
—	(Germany) #920 AV Racing by Black Falcon				C	1		6				—
—	(Germany) #926 Smyrlis Racing			5								—
—	(Germany) #95 Sante Royale Racing Team				C	6						—
—	(Germany) #925 Huber Motorsport			7	C	Ret						—
—	(Germany) #935 RPM Racing	C		8								—
Pos.	Team	NLS1	NLS2	NLS3	24H-Q		NLS6	NLS7	NLS8	NLS9	NLS10	Points

===== CUP3 =====
Pos.	Team	NLS1	NLS2	NLS3	24H-Q		NLS6	NLS7	NLS8	NLS9	NLS10	Points
1	(Germany) #953 Smyrlis Racing		1	1	C	1	Ret	1				70
2	(Germany) #962 W&S Motorsport	C	Ret	3			1	2				66.5
3	(Germany) #944 9und11 Racing	C	5	5			2	7				52.5
4	(Germany) #959 SRS Team Sorg Rennsport	C	2	2	C	2	Ret	6				50
5	(Germany) #961 W&S Motorsport	C	4	4			Ret	3				48.5
6	(Germany) #971 Speedworxx Automotive	C	6	6			5	5				48.5
7	(Germany) #950 Schmickler Performance powered by Ravenol	C	3	Ret			10	4				40.5
8	(Germany) #982 W&S Motorsport	C	9	9			8	9				32.5
9	(Germany) #949 SRS Team Sorg Rennsport	C	7	Ret			6	8				31
10	(Germany) #977 Team Extreme Racing			7	C	Ret	3	14				30
11	(Germany) #952 Smyrlis Racing	C	11	12			9	12				24.5
12	(Germany) #951 Smyrlis Racing	C	14	16			4	15				23.5
13	(Germany) #969 SRS Team Sorg Rennsport	C	8	8			NC	16				19
14	(Germany) #941 Adrenalin Motorsport Team Mainhattan Wheels	C	10	Ret	C	3	7	Ret				15
15	(Thailand) #945 Renazzo Motorsport	C	15	10	C	7	12	Ret				13
16	(Germany) #966 asBest Racing	C	Ret	Ret	C	WD	Ret	11				9
17	(Germany) #979 SRS Team Sorg Rennsport	C	12	13								8
—	(United Kingdom) #967 Breakell Racing			Ret	C	6						—
Non-championship entries
—	(Germany) #939 Black Falcon	C		11	C	4						—
—	(Germany) #978 Kkrämer Racing	C	13		C	5						—
—	(Belgium) #999 Mühlner Motorsport				C	8	11	13				—
—	(Germany) #990 Max Kruse Racing							10				—
—	(Germany) #980 Lionspeed GP	C		14				Ret				—
—	(Germany) #989 Lionspeed GP			15								—
—	(Germany) #964 SRS Team Sorg Rennsport							17				—
—	(Germany) #960 Schmickler Performance powered by Ravenol	C		Ret				Ret				—
—	(Switzerland) #977 BSL Racing Team				C	Ret						—
Pos.	Team	NLS1	NLS2	NLS3	24H-Q		NLS6	NLS7	NLS8	NLS9	NLS10	Points

== See also ==
- 2026 24 Hours of Nürburgring
