= 2024 Ultimate Cup Series =

Edition of motorsport championship

The 2024 Ultimate Cup Series was the sixth season of the Ultimate Cup Series. It began at Circuit Paul Ricard on 15 March and finished at the same venue on 8 November. The Ultimate Cup Series is a program comprising multiple endurance and sprint championships across different classes of motor racing.

== Calendar ==
The 2024 calendar saw the Portuguese round move from Estoril to Algarve. The round at Navarra was replaced by a round at Mugello, marking the series' return to the venue after last competing there in 2019.

Round	Circuit	Date	Map of circuit locations
1	(France) Circuit Paul Ricard, Le Castellet	15–17 March	2024 Ultimate Cup Series is located in Europe
2	(Portugal) Algarve International Circuit, Portimão	24–26 May	2024 Ultimate Cup Series is located in Europe
3	(Germany) Hockenheimring, Hockenheim	5–7 July	2024 Ultimate Cup Series is located in Europe
4	(Italy) Mugello Circuit, Scarperia e San Piero	6–8 September	2024 Ultimate Cup Series is located in Europe
5	(France) Circuit de Nevers Magny-Cours, Magny-Cours	11–13 October	2024 Ultimate Cup Series is located in Europe
6	(France) Circuit Paul Ricard, Le Castellet	8–10 November	2024 Ultimate Cup Series is located in Europe

== European Endurance Prototype Cup ==
The European Endurance Prototype Cup was open to LMP3, Nova Proto NP02s and Group CN cars.

=== Teams and drivers ===
Team	Chassis	Engine	No.	Drivers	U	Rounds
LMP3
(Poland) Team Virage	Ligier JS P320	Nissan VK56DE 5.6 L V8	1	(Switzerland) Axel Gnos		All
(Poland) Team Virage	Ligier JS P320	Nissan VK56DE 5.6 L V8	1	(Greece) Georgios Kolovos		All
(Poland) Team Virage	Ligier JS P320	Nissan VK56DE 5.6 L V8	1	(Greece) Panagiotis Kaitatzis		1
(Poland) Team Virage	Ligier JS P320	Nissan VK56DE 5.6 L V8	1	(France) Sacha Lehmann		2–6
(Poland) Team Virage	Ligier JS P320	Nissan VK56DE 5.6 L V8	42	(France) Marius Fossard		4, 6
(Poland) Team Virage	Ligier JS P320	Nissan VK56DE 5.6 L V8	42	(Greece) Paris Stavrakidis		4, 6
(Poland) Team Virage	Ligier JS P320	Nissan VK56DE 5.6 L V8	42	(Canada) Bertrand Godin		4
(Poland) Team Virage	Ligier JS P320	Nissan VK56DE 5.6 L V8	42	(United Kingdom) Hadyn Chance		6
(Poland) Team Virage	Ligier JS P320	Nissan VK56DE 5.6 L V8	88	(Spain) Daniel Maciá		All
(Poland) Team Virage	Ligier JS P320	Nissan VK56DE 5.6 L V8	88	(France) Raphaël Narac		All
(Poland) Team Virage	Ligier JS P320	Nissan VK56DE 5.6 L V8	88	(Poland) Jacek Zielonka		All
(France) Graff Racing	Ligier JS P320	Nissan VK56DE 5.6 L V8	2	(Switzerland) Samir Ben		2
(France) Graff Racing	Ligier JS P320	Nissan VK56DE 5.6 L V8	2	(China) Haowen Luo		2
(France) Graff Racing	Ligier JS P320	Nissan VK56DE 5.6 L V8	2	(United Kingdom) George King		2
(Slovakia) ARC Bratislava	Ligier JS P320	Nissan VK56DE 5.6 L V8	6	(Slovakia) Miro Konôpka		3
(Slovakia) ARC Bratislava	Ligier JS P320	Nissan VK56DE 5.6 L V8	6	(Slovakia) Zdeno Mikulasko		3
(Slovakia) ARC Bratislava	Ligier JS P320	Nissan VK56DE 5.6 L V8	6	(Hungary) Balazs Volenter		3
(Switzerland) Racing Spirit of Léman	Ligier JS P320	Nissan VK56DE 5.6 L V8	10	(Germany) Christian Gisy		2, 4, 6
(Switzerland) Racing Spirit of Léman	Ligier JS P320	Nissan VK56DE 5.6 L V8	10	(Germany) Ralf Kelleners		2, 4, 6
(Switzerland) Racing Spirit of Léman	Ligier JS P320	Nissan VK56DE 5.6 L V8	10	(Germany) Sebastian Schmitz		2
(Switzerland) Racing Spirit of Léman	Ligier JS P320	Nissan VK56DE 5.6 L V8	10	(Germany) Dominik Schraml		2
(Switzerland) Racing Spirit of Léman	Ligier JS P320	Nissan VK56DE 5.6 L V8	64	(Austria) Michael Doppelmayr		4–6
(Switzerland) Racing Spirit of Léman	Ligier JS P320	Nissan VK56DE 5.6 L V8	64	(Germany) Elia Erhart		4–6
(Switzerland) Racing Spirit of Léman	Ligier JS P320	Nissan VK56DE 5.6 L V8	64	(Germany) Pierre Kaffer		4–6
(Spain) CD Sport	Ligier JS P320	Nissan VK56DE 5.6 L V8	11	(France) Franck Chappard		2
(Spain) CD Sport	Ligier JS P320	Nissan VK56DE 5.6 L V8	11	(France) Willyam Gosselin		2
(Spain) CD Sport	Ligier JS P320	Nissan VK56DE 5.6 L V8	11	(United Kingdom) Chris Short		2
(Italy) Eurointernational	Ligier JS P320	Nissan VK56DE 5.6 L V8	11	(Canada) Adam Ali		4
(Italy) Eurointernational	Ligier JS P320	Nissan VK56DE 5.6 L V8	11	(Canada) Daniel Ali		4
(Italy) Eurointernational	Ligier JS P320	Nissan VK56DE 5.6 L V8	11	(United Kingdom) Matthew Richard Bell		4
(France) CMR	Ginetta G61-LT-P3	Nissan VK56DE 5.6 L V8	12	(France) Nico Prost		1–2, 4–6
(France) CMR	Ginetta G61-LT-P3	Nissan VK56DE 5.6 L V8	12	(France) Fabien Michal		1–2
(France) CMR	Ginetta G61-LT-P3	Nissan VK56DE 5.6 L V8	12	(France) Gwenael Delomier		2, 4–6
(France) CMR	Ginetta G61-LT-P3	Nissan VK56DE 5.6 L V8	62	(United Kingdom) Mike Simpson		1–2
(France) CMR	Ginetta G61-LT-P3	Nissan VK56DE 5.6 L V8	62	(United Kingdom) Lawrence Tomlinson		1
(France) CMR	Ginetta G61-LT-P3	Nissan VK56DE 5.6 L V8	62	(United Kingdom) Freddie Tomlinson		1
(France) CMR	Ginetta G61-LT-P3	Nissan VK56DE 5.6 L V8	62	(United Kingdom) Andrew Bentley		2
(France) CMR	Ginetta G61-LT-P3	Nissan VK56DE 5.6 L V8	62	(United Kingdom) Sennan Fielding		2
(United Kingdom) RLR MSport	Ligier JS P320	Nissan VK56DE 5.6 L V8	15	(United States) Wyatt Brichacek		4
(United Kingdom) RLR MSport	Ligier JS P320	Nissan VK56DE 5.6 L V8	15	(Canada) James Dayson		4
(United Kingdom) RLR MSport	Ligier JS P320	Nissan VK56DE 5.6 L V8	15	(United Kingdom) Chris Short		4
(United Kingdom) RLR MSport	Ligier JS P320	Nissan VK56DE 5.6 L V8	77	(Mexico) Ian Aguilera		1
(United Kingdom) RLR MSport	Ligier JS P320	Nissan VK56DE 5.6 L V8	77	(Canada) James Dayson		1
(Italy) TS Corse	Duqueine M30 - D08	Nissan VK56DE 5.6 L V8	24	(Australia) Nathan Kumar		All
(Italy) TS Corse	Duqueine M30 - D08	Nissan VK56DE 5.6 L V8	24	(Denmark) Theodor Jensen		1
(Italy) TS Corse	Duqueine M30 - D08	Nissan VK56DE 5.6 L V8	24	(Italy) "Valerio"		1
(Italy) TS Corse	Duqueine M30 - D08	Nissan VK56DE 5.6 L V8	24	(Italy) Gianluca Giraudi		2
(Italy) TS Corse	Duqueine M30 - D08	Nissan VK56DE 5.6 L V8	24	(United Kingdom) Ayrton Simmons		2
(Italy) TS Corse	Duqueine M30 - D08	Nissan VK56DE 5.6 L V8	24	(United Kingdom) George King		3, 5
(Italy) TS Corse	Duqueine M30 - D08	Nissan VK56DE 5.6 L V8	24	(Singapore) Danial Frost		3
(Italy) TS Corse	Duqueine M30 - D08	Nissan VK56DE 5.6 L V8	24	(Italy) Francesco Simonazzi		4, 6
(Italy) TS Corse	Duqueine M30 - D08	Nissan VK56DE 5.6 L V8	24	(Spain) Daniel Nogales Lopez		4
(Italy) TS Corse	Duqueine M30 - D08	Nissan VK56DE 5.6 L V8	24	(United Arab Emirates) Alim Geshev (Note: Gutak is Russian, but he competes as a neutral competitor as Russian national emblems were banned by the FIA due to the Russian invasion of Ukraine. Bukhantsov and Geshev, also Russians, both compete under an Emirati licence for the same reason.)		5
(Italy) TS Corse	Duqueine M30 - D08	Nissan VK56DE 5.6 L V8	24	(Romania) Robert Vișoiu		6
(Czech Republic) Bretton Racing	Ligier JS P320	Nissan VK56DE 5.6 L V8	26	(France) Marius Fossard		1–2
(Czech Republic) Bretton Racing	Ligier JS P320	Nissan VK56DE 5.6 L V8	26	Vyacheslav Gutak		1
(Czech Republic) Bretton Racing	Ligier JS P320	Nissan VK56DE 5.6 L V8	26	(Czech Republic) Dan Skočdopole		1
(Czech Republic) Bretton Racing	Ligier JS P320	Nissan VK56DE 5.6 L V8	26	(Portugal) Manuel Espírito Santo		2
(Czech Republic) Bretton Racing	Ligier JS P320	Nissan VK56DE 5.6 L V8	26	(Portugal) Bernardo Pinheiro		2
(Czech Republic) Bretton Racing	Ligier JS P320	Nissan VK56DE 5.6 L V8	69	(United Kingdom) Alessandro Bressan		4
(Czech Republic) Bretton Racing	Ligier JS P320	Nissan VK56DE 5.6 L V8	69	(Denmark) Theodor Jensen		4
(Czech Republic) Bretton Racing	Ligier JS P320	Nissan VK56DE 5.6 L V8	69	(United Kingdom) Ben Stone		4
(Luxembourg) DKR Engineering	Duqueine M30 - D08	Nissan VK56DE 5.6 L V8	33	(United States) Jon Brownson		2
(Luxembourg) DKR Engineering	Duqueine M30 - D08	Nissan VK56DE 5.6 L V8	33	(Germany) Laurents Hörr		2
(Luxembourg) DKR Engineering	Duqueine M30 - D08	Nissan VK56DE 5.6 L V8	33	(China) Pengcheng Ye		2
(Luxembourg) DKR Engineering	Duqueine M30 - D08	Nissan VK56DE 5.6 L V8	33	(France) Benjamin Rouget		2
(Poland) Inter Europol Competition	Ligier JS P320	Nissan VK56DE 5.6 L V8	34	(Mozambique) Pedro Perino		1–2, 4, 6
(Poland) Inter Europol Competition	Ligier JS P320	Nissan VK56DE 5.6 L V8	34	(United Arab Emirates) Alexander Bukhantsov		1–2, 4
(Poland) Inter Europol Competition	Ligier JS P320	Nissan VK56DE 5.6 L V8	34	(United Kingdom) Tim Creswick		1
(Poland) Inter Europol Competition	Ligier JS P320	Nissan VK56DE 5.6 L V8	34	(Netherlands) Niels Koolen		2
(Poland) Inter Europol Competition	Ligier JS P320	Nissan VK56DE 5.6 L V8	34	(United Kingdom) Kai Askey		4
(Poland) Inter Europol Competition	Ligier JS P320	Nissan VK56DE 5.6 L V8	34	(Netherlands) Dane Arendsen		5–6
(Poland) Inter Europol Competition	Ligier JS P320	Nissan VK56DE 5.6 L V8	34	(France) Romain Favre		5–6
(Poland) Inter Europol Competition	Ligier JS P320	Nissan VK56DE 5.6 L V8	43	(Netherlands) Dane Arendsen		4
(Poland) Inter Europol Competition	Ligier JS P320	Nissan VK56DE 5.6 L V8	43	(United Kingdom) Tim Creswick		4
(Poland) Inter Europol Competition	Ligier JS P320	Nissan VK56DE 5.6 L V8	43	(Denmark) Sebastian Gravlund		4
(United Kingdom) BHK Motorsport	Duqueine M30 - D08	Nissan VK56DE 5.6 L V8	35	(Italy) Sergio Campana		2
(United Kingdom) BHK Motorsport	Duqueine M30 - D08	Nissan VK56DE 5.6 L V8	35	(Italy) Francesco Dracone		2
(Germany) Reiter Engineering	Ligier JS P320	Nissan VK56DE 5.6 L V8	57	(France) Vincent Capillaire		All
(Germany) Reiter Engineering	Ligier JS P320	Nissan VK56DE 5.6 L V8	57	(France) Nicolas Chartier		All
(Germany) Reiter Engineering	Ligier JS P320	Nissan VK56DE 5.6 L V8	57	(Switzerland) Stephan Rupp		All
(Australia) GG Classics	Ligier JS P320	Nissan VK56DE 5.6 L V8	58	(Australia) George Nakas		4
(Australia) GG Classics	Ligier JS P320	Nissan VK56DE 5.6 L V8	58	(Australia) Fraser Ross		4
(Australia) GG Classics	Ligier JS P320	Nissan VK56DE 5.6 L V8	58	(United Kingdom) James Sweatnam		4
(Austria) MG Sound Speed Division	Ginetta G61-LT-P3	Nissan VK56DE 5.6 L V8	61	(Austria) Martin Böhm	**U**	1–4, 6
(Austria) MG Sound Speed Division	Ginetta G61-LT-P3	Nissan VK56DE 5.6 L V8	61	(Austria) Andreas Fojtik	**U**	1–4, 6
(Switzerland) Haegeli by T2 Racing	Duqueine M30 - D08	Nissan VK56DE 5.6 L V8	68	(Germany) Sebastian Schmitt		3, 6
(Switzerland) Haegeli by T2 Racing	Duqueine M30 - D08	Nissan VK56DE 5.6 L V8	68	(Germany) Dominik Schraml		3, 6
(Switzerland) Haegeli by T2 Racing	Duqueine M30 - D08	Nissan VK56DE 5.6 L V8	68	(Netherlands) Marcel Oosenbrugh		3
(Switzerland) Haegeli by T2 Racing	Duqueine M30 - D08	Nissan VK56DE 5.6 L V8	68	(Austria) Felix Neuhofer		6
(France) ANS Motorsport	Ligier JS P320	Nissan VK56DE 5.6 L V8	84	(France) Julien Lemoine	**U** 1	1–4
(France) ANS Motorsport	Ligier JS P320	Nissan VK56DE 5.6 L V8	84	(France) Paul Trojani	**U** 1	1–2, 4
(France) ANS Motorsport	Ligier JS P320	Nissan VK56DE 5.6 L V8	84	(France) Clément Moreno	**U** 1	3
(France) R-ace GP	Duqueine M30 - D08	Nissan VK56DE 5.6 L V8	85	(France) Hadrien David		4
(France) R-ace GP	Duqueine M30 - D08	Nissan VK56DE 5.6 L V8	85	(France) Fabien Michal		4
(France) R-ace GP	Duqueine M30 - D08	Nissan VK56DE 5.6 L V8	85	(France) Romano Ricci		4
(Switzerland) Cool Racing	Ligier JS P320	Nissan VK56DE 5.6 L V8	87	(France) Adrien Closmenil		1, 4, 6
(Switzerland) Cool Racing	Ligier JS P320	Nissan VK56DE 5.6 L V8	87	(Switzerland) Cédric Oltramare		1
(Switzerland) Cool Racing	Ligier JS P320	Nissan VK56DE 5.6 L V8	87	(Switzerland) David Droux		4, 6
(Switzerland) Cool Racing	Ligier JS P320	Nissan VK56DE 5.6 L V8	87	(Belgium) Quentin Joseph		4, 6
NP02
(Spain) CD Sport	Nova Proto NP02	Ford Coyote 5.0 L V8	3	(United Kingdom) Nick Adcock	**U** 1	1–2, 4–6
(Spain) CD Sport	Nova Proto NP02	Ford Coyote 5.0 L V8	3	(Denmark) Michael Jensen	**U** 1	1–2, 4–6
(Spain) CD Sport	Nova Proto NP02	Ford Coyote 5.0 L V8	3	(France) Paul Alberto	**U** 1	1
(Spain) CD Sport	Nova Proto NP02	Ford Coyote 5.0 L V8	3	(Mexico) Ian Aguilera	**U** 1	2, 4
(Spain) CD Sport	Nova Proto NP02	Ford Coyote 5.0 L V8	3	(France) Yann Zimmer	**U** 1	5
(Spain) CD Sport	Nova Proto NP02	Ford Coyote 5.0 L V8	4	(France) Christophe Carriere		All
(Spain) CD Sport	Nova Proto NP02	Ford Coyote 5.0 L V8	4	(France) Maxence Maurice		All
(Spain) CD Sport	Nova Proto NP02	Ford Coyote 5.0 L V8	4	(France) Kevin Bole Besançon		1
(Spain) CD Sport	Nova Proto NP02	Ford Coyote 5.0 L V8	4	(France) Louis Maurice		2–6
(Spain) CD Sport	Nova Proto NP02	Ford Coyote 5.0 L V8	5	(France) Thomas Imbourg		All
(Spain) CD Sport	Nova Proto NP02	Ford Coyote 5.0 L V8	5	(South Africa) Jonathan Thomas		All
(France) Graff Racing	Nova Proto NP02	Ford Coyote 5.0 L V8	7	(United Kingdom) James Winslow		All
(France) Graff Racing	Nova Proto NP02	Ford Coyote 5.0 L V8	7	(United Arab Emirates) Alim Geshev		1–2
(France) Graff Racing	Nova Proto NP02	Ford Coyote 5.0 L V8	7	(Australia) John Corbett		2–6
(France) Graff Racing	Nova Proto NP02	Ford Coyote 5.0 L V8	8	(Switzerland) Loris Kyburz		1–3, 5–6
(France) Graff Racing	Nova Proto NP02	Ford Coyote 5.0 L V8	8	(France) Louis Rossi		1–2
(France) Graff Racing	Nova Proto NP02	Ford Coyote 5.0 L V8	8	(France) Yann Zimmer		1
(France) Graff Racing	Nova Proto NP02	Ford Coyote 5.0 L V8	8	(Switzerland) Sebastien Page		2–3, 6
(France) Graff Racing	Nova Proto NP02	Ford Coyote 5.0 L V8	8	(France) Rémy Deguffroy		3, 5
(France) Graff Racing	Nova Proto NP02	Ford Coyote 5.0 L V8	8	(Switzerland) Kevin Rabin		4–6
(France) Graff Racing	Nova Proto NP02	Ford Coyote 5.0 L V8	8	(Taiwan) Chun-Ting Chou		4
(France) Graff Racing	Nova Proto NP02	Ford Coyote 5.0 L V8	8	(United Kingdom) George King		4
(France) Graff Racing	Nova Proto NP02	Ford Coyote 5.0 L V8	9	(Switzerland) Luis Sanjuan		All
(France) Graff Racing	Nova Proto NP02	Ford Coyote 5.0 L V8	9	(France) Eric Trouillet		All
(France) Graff Racing	Nova Proto NP02	Ford Coyote 5.0 L V8	9	(France) David Droux		1–3, 5
(France) Graff Racing	Nova Proto NP02	Ford Coyote 5.0 L V8	9	(Switzerland) Loris Kyburz		4
(France) Graff Racing	Nova Proto NP02	Ford Coyote 5.0 L V8	9	(France) Gaël Julien		6
(France) Graff Racing	Nova Proto NP02	Ford Coyote 5.0 L V8	39	(France) Rémy Deguffroy		6
(France) Graff Racing	Nova Proto NP02	Ford Coyote 5.0 L V8	39	(United Kingdom) George King		6
(France) Graff Racing	Nova Proto NP02	Ford Coyote 5.0 L V8	39	(France) Louis Rossi		6
(France) Lamo Racing	Nova Proto NP02	Ford Coyote 5.0 L V8	17	(Switzerland) Danny Buntschu		All
(France) Lamo Racing	Nova Proto NP02	Ford Coyote 5.0 L V8	17	(France) Fred Morel		1–3
(France) Lamo Racing	Nova Proto NP02	Ford Coyote 5.0 L V8	17	(France) Jonathan Correrella		1
(France) Lamo Racing	Nova Proto NP02	Ford Coyote 5.0 L V8	17	(Switzerland) Kevin Rabin		3
(France) Lamo Racing	Nova Proto NP02	Ford Coyote 5.0 L V8	17	(Switzerland) Caryl Fritsche		4
(France) Lamo Racing	Nova Proto NP02	Ford Coyote 5.0 L V8	17	(France) Yann Zimmer		4
(France) Lamo Racing	Nova Proto NP02	Ford Coyote 5.0 L V8	17	(Switzerland) Sacha Clavadetscher		5–6
(France) Lamo Racing	Nova Proto NP02	Ford Coyote 5.0 L V8	17	(France) Nico Ferrarin		6
(France) Lamo Racing	Nova Proto NP02	Ford Coyote 5.0 L V8	777	(France) Jean-Marc Alaphilippe	**U** 1	All
(France) Lamo Racing	Nova Proto NP02	Ford Coyote 5.0 L V8	777	(France) Alexandre Lafourcade	**U** 1	All
(France) Lamo Racing	Nova Proto NP02	Ford Coyote 5.0 L V8	777	(France) Quentin Antonel	**U** 1	1–4, 6
(France) Lamo Racing	Nova Proto NP02	Ford Coyote 5.0 L V8	777	(France) Thomas Perrin	**U** 1	3
(France) DB Autosport	Nova Proto NP02	Ford Coyote 5.0 L V8	20	(France) Adrien Bastide	**U** 1	1, 5–6
(France) DB Autosport	Nova Proto NP02	Ford Coyote 5.0 L V8	20	(France) Philippe Yschard	**U** 1	1
(France) DB Autosport	Nova Proto NP02	Ford Coyote 5.0 L V8	20	(France) William Cavailhes	**U** 1	2, 4
(France) DB Autosport	Nova Proto NP02	Ford Coyote 5.0 L V8	20	(France) David Cristini	**U** 1	2, 4
(France) DB Autosport	Nova Proto NP02	Ford Coyote 5.0 L V8	20	(France) David Delucinge	**U** 1	2, 4
(France) DB Autosport	Nova Proto NP02	Ford Coyote 5.0 L V8	20	(France) Christopher Brenier	**U** 1	2
(France) DB Autosport	Nova Proto NP02	Ford Coyote 5.0 L V8	20	(Switzerland) Mathias Beche	**U** 1	5
(France) DB Autosport	Nova Proto NP02	Ford Coyote 5.0 L V8	20	(France) Quentin Bassora	**U** 1	6
(France) DB Autosport	Nova Proto NP02	Ford Coyote 5.0 L V8	21	(France) Daniel Bassora	**U** 2	All
(France) DB Autosport	Nova Proto NP02	Ford Coyote 5.0 L V8	21	(France) Quentin Bassora	**U** 2	1–5
(France) DB Autosport	Nova Proto NP02	Ford Coyote 5.0 L V8	21	(Switzerland) Mathias Beche	**U** 2	1–2, 4, 6
(France) DB Autosport	Nova Proto NP02	Ford Coyote 5.0 L V8	21	(France) Philippe Yschard	**U** 2	5
(France) Extreme Limite	Nova Proto NP02	Ford Coyote 5.0 L V8	25	(France) Marc Bonnet		5–6
(France) Extreme Limite	Nova Proto NP02	Ford Coyote 5.0 L V8	25	(France) Benjamin Redais		5–6
(France) MV2S	Nova Proto NP02	Ford Coyote 5.0 L V8	27	(France) Christophe Cresp		All
(France) MV2S	Nova Proto NP02	Ford Coyote 5.0 L V8	27	(France) Pierre-Alexandre Provost		All
(France) MV2S	Nova Proto NP02	Ford Coyote 5.0 L V8	28	(France) Philippe Cimadomo	**U** 1	All
(France) MV2S	Nova Proto NP02	Ford Coyote 5.0 L V8	28	(France) Clément Moreno	**U** 1	1
(France) MV2S	Nova Proto NP02	Ford Coyote 5.0 L V8	28	(Australia) Roman Krumins	**U** 1	2
(France) MV2S	Nova Proto NP02	Ford Coyote 5.0 L V8	28	(United Kingdom) Maximus Mayer	**U** 1	2
(France) MV2S	Nova Proto NP02	Ford Coyote 5.0 L V8	28	(France) Tim Merieux	**U** 1	3–6
(Switzerland) Racing Spirit of Léman	Nova Proto NP02	Ford Coyote 5.0 L V8	51	(Switzerland) Nicolas Maulini		All
(Switzerland) Racing Spirit of Léman	Nova Proto NP02	Ford Coyote 5.0 L V8	51	(France) Jacques Wolff		1–2, 4–6
(Switzerland) Racing Spirit of Léman	Nova Proto NP02	Ford Coyote 5.0 L V8	51	(Switzerland) Benjamin Monnay		2–3
(France) ANS Motorsport	Nova Proto NP02	Ford Coyote 5.0 L V8	70	(Monaco) Adrien Yvon	**U**	5–6
(France) ANS Motorsport	Nova Proto NP02	Ford Coyote 5.0 L V8	70	(France) Alexandre Yvon	**U**	5–6
(France) ANS Motorsport	Nova Proto NP02	Ford Coyote 5.0 L V8	70	(France) Jean-François Yvon	**U**	5–6
(France) ANS Motorsport	Nova Proto NP02	Ford Coyote 5.0 L V8	71	(Monaco) Marc Faggionato		All
(France) ANS Motorsport	Nova Proto NP02	Ford Coyote 5.0 L V8	71	(Switzerland) Karen Gaillard		All
(France) ANS Motorsport	Nova Proto NP02	Ford Coyote 5.0 L V8	71	(France) Iko Segret		All
(France) ANS Motorsport	Nova Proto NP02	Ford Coyote 5.0 L V8	72	(France) Erwin Creed		All
(France) ANS Motorsport	Nova Proto NP02	Ford Coyote 5.0 L V8	72	(France) Mathis Poulet		All
(France) ANS Motorsport	Nova Proto NP02	Ford Coyote 5.0 L V8	72	(France) Philippe Mondolot		1–4
(France) ANS Motorsport	Nova Proto NP02	Ford Coyote 5.0 L V8	72	(France) Fred Morel		5
(France) ANS Motorsport	Nova Proto NP02	Ford Coyote 5.0 L V8	72	(France) Paul Trojani		6
(France) ANS Motorsport	Nova Proto NP02	Ford Coyote 5.0 L V8	73	(France) Frédéric Croullet	**U** 4	All
(France) ANS Motorsport	Nova Proto NP02	Ford Coyote 5.0 L V8	73	(France) Rodolphe Rosati	**U** 4	1–3, 5
(France) ANS Motorsport	Nova Proto NP02	Ford Coyote 5.0 L V8	73	(France) Nicolas Schatz	**U** 4	4
(France) ANS Motorsport	Nova Proto NP02	Ford Coyote 5.0 L V8	73	(France) Mathys Jaubert	**U** 4	6
(France) Nerguti Competition	Nova Proto NP02	Ford Coyote 5.0 L V8	99	(France) Alban Nerguti		1–2
(France) Nerguti Competition	Nova Proto NP02	Ford Coyote 5.0 L V8	99	(Monaco) Stéphane Ortelli		1–2
(France) Cogemo Racing Team	Nova Proto NP02	Ford Coyote 5.0 L V8	154	(France) Jesse Bouhet		All
(France) Cogemo Racing Team	Nova Proto NP02	Ford Coyote 5.0 L V8	154	(France) Antoine Lacoste		1–2, 4–5
(France) Cogemo Racing Team	Nova Proto NP02	Ford Coyote 5.0 L V8	154	(France) Yohan Rossel		1, 3, 6
(France) Cogemo Racing Team	Nova Proto NP02	Ford Coyote 5.0 L V8	154	(France) Thomas Laurent		2
(France) Cogemo Racing Team	Nova Proto NP02	Ford Coyote 5.0 L V8	154	(Mexico) Sebastián Álvarez		4
(France) Cogemo Racing Team	Nova Proto NP02	Ford Coyote 5.0 L V8	154	(United Kingdom) Kai Askey		5
(France) Cogemo Racing Team	Nova Proto NP02	Ford Coyote 5.0 L V8	154	(France) Marlon Hernandez		6
(France) Cogemo Racing Team	Nova Proto NP02	Ford Coyote 5.0 L V8	555	(France) Denis Caillon	**U**	All
(France) Cogemo Racing Team	Nova Proto NP02	Ford Coyote 5.0 L V8	555	(France) Philippe Thirion	**U**	All
(France) Cogemo Racing Team	Nova Proto NP02	Ford Coyote 5.0 L V8	555	(France) Sébastien Morales	**U**	1–4, 6
(France) Cogemo Racing Team	Nova Proto NP02	Ford Coyote 5.0 L V8	555	(France) Arnold Robin	**U**	5

=== Race results ===
Bold indicates overall winner.

Round	Circuit	Pole Position	LMP3 Winning Car	NP02 Winning Car
Round	Circuit	Pole Position	LMP3 Winning Drivers	NP02 Winning Drivers
1	(France) Paul Ricard	(Switzerland) No. 87 Cool Racing	(Poland) No. 88 Team Virage	**(France) No. 9 Graff Racing**
1	(France) Paul Ricard	(Switzerland) Adrien Closmenil (Switzerland) Cédric Oltramare	(Spain) Daniel Maciá (France) Raphaël Narac (Poland) Jacek Zielonka	**(France) David Droux** **(Switzerland) Luis Sanjuan** **(France) Eric Trouillet**
2	(Portugal) Algarve	(Czech Republic) No. 26 Bretton Racing	**(Poland) No. 1 Team Virage**	(France) No. 7 Graff Racing
2	(Portugal) Algarve	(Portugal) Manuel Espírito Santo (France) Marius Fossard (Portugal) Bernardo Pinheiro	**(Switzerland) Axel Gnos** **(Greece) Panagiotis Kaitatzis** **(Greece) Georgios Kolovos**	(Australia) John Corbett (United Arab Emirates) Alim Geshev (United Kingdom) James Winslow
3	(Germany) Hockenheimring	(France) **No. 17 Lamo Racing**	(Poland) No. 1 Team Virage	**(Spain) No. 5 CD Sport**
3	(Germany) Hockenheimring	(Switzerland) Danny Buntschu (France) Fred Morel (Switzerland) Kevin Rabin	(Switzerland) Axel Gnos (Greece) Georgios Kolovos (France) Sacha Lehmann	**(France) Thomas Imbourg** **(South Africa) Jonathan Thomas**
4	(Italy) Mugello	(Spain) No. 5 CD Sport	(United Kingdom) No. 15 RLR MSport	**(France) No. 7 Graff Racing**
4	(Italy) Mugello	(France) Thomas Imbourg (South Africa) Jonathan Thomas	(United States) Wyatt Brichacek (Canada) James Dayson (United Kingdom) Chris Short	**(Australia) John Corbett** **(United Kingdom) James Winslow**
5	(France) Magny-Cours	(Spain) No. 5 CD Sport	(Poland) No. 34 Inter Europol Competition	**(Spain) No. 4 CD Sport**
5	(France) Magny-Cours	(France) Thomas Imbourg (South Africa) Jonathan Thomas	(Netherlands) Dane Arendsen (France) Romain Favre (Mozambique) Pedro Perino	**(France) Christophe Carriere** **(France) Louis Maurice** **(France) Maxence Maurice**
6	(France) Paul Ricard	(France) No. 9 Graff Racing	(Poland) No. 34 Inter Europol Competition	**(France) No. 154 Cogemo Racing Team**
6	(France) Paul Ricard	(France) Gaël Julien (Switzerland) Luis Sanjuan (France) Eric Trouillet	(Netherlands) Dane Arendsen (France) Romain Favre (Mozambique) Pedro Perino	**(France) Jesse Bouhet** **(France) Marlon Hernandez** **(France) Yohan Rossel**

=== Championship standings ===
==== Drivers' standings ====
Pos.	Drivers	Team	(France) LEC1	(Portugal) ALG	(Germany) HOC	(Italy) MUG	(France) MAG	(France) LEC2	Points	UC
Overall
1	(Switzerland) Luis Sanjuan (France) Eric Trouillet	(France) Graff Racing	1	7	Ret	2	2	**2**	85	
2	(United Kingdom) James Winslow	(France) Graff Racing	28	2	5	1	16	Ret	54	
3	(Australia) John Corbett	(France) Graff Racing		2	5	1	16	Ret	53.5	
4	(France) Jesse Bouhet	(France) Cogemo Racing Team	7	8	3	22	11	3	51	
5	(Switzerland) Axel Gnos (Greece) Georgios Kolovos	(Poland) Team Virage	10	1	2	8	9	13	50.5	
6	(France) David Droux	(France) Graff Racing	1	7	Ret		2		50	
6	(France) David Droux	(Switzerland) Cool Racing				25		11	50	
7	(France) Christophe Cresp (France) Pierre-Alexandre Provost	(France) MV2S	Ret	4	8	5	4	4	50	
8	(France) Sacha Lehmann	(Poland) Team Virage		1	2	8	9	13	49.5	
9	(France) Yohan Rossel	(France) Cogemo Racing Team	7		3			1	46	
10	(Spain) Daniel Maciá (France) Raphaël Narac (Poland) Jacek Zielonka	(Poland) Team Virage	3	Ret	4	6	8	8	43	
11	(Switzerland) Loris Kyburz	(France) Graff Racing	2	14	13	2	10	20	38.5	
12	(France) Nicolas Maulini	(Switzerland) Racing Spirit of Léman	6	21	9	4	3	15	38	
13	(Switzerland) Jacques Wolff	(Switzerland) Racing Spirit of Léman	6	21		4	3	15	36	
14	(Mozambique) Pedro Perino	(Poland) Inter Europol Competition	4	10		9	7	3	36	
15	(France) Thomas Imbourg (South Africa) Jonathan Thomas	(Spain) CD Sport	23	20	1	**15**	**13**†	6	34.5	
16	(Monaco) Marc Faggionato (Switzerland) Karen Gaillard (France) Iko Segret	(France) ANS Motorsport	8	15	6	7	24†	5	29	
17	(France) Christophe Carriere (France) Maxence Maurice	(Spain) CD Sport	26	Ret	10	21	1	14	27.5	
18	(France) Louis Maurice	(Spain) CD Sport		Ret	10	21	1	14	27	
19	(France) Yann Zimmer	(France) Graff Racing	2						26	
19	(France) Yann Zimmer	(France) Graff Racing				DNS			26	
19	(France) Yann Zimmer	(Spain) CD Sport				6			26	
20	(Mexico) Ian Aguilera	(United Kingdom) RLR MSport	5						25.5	
20	(Mexico) Ian Aguilera	(Spain) CD Sport		3		12			25.5	
21	(France) Marlon Hernandez	(France) Cogemo Racing Team						1	25	
22	(France) Denis Caillon (France) Philippe Thirion	(France) Cogemo Racing Team	Ret	6	7	18	5	19	25	
23	(United Kingdom) Nick Adcock (Denmark) Michael Jensen	(Spain) CD Sport	16	3		12	6	Ret	24	
24	(Netherlands) Dane Arendsen	(Poland) Inter Europol Competition				24	7	3	21.5	
25	(France) Romain Favre	(Poland) Inter Europol Competition					7	3	21	
26	(United Arab Emirates) Alim Geshev	(France) Graff Racing	28	2					19	
26	(United Arab Emirates) Alim Geshev	(Italy) TS Corse					18		19	
27	(France) Louis Rossi	(France) Graff Racing	2	14				28	19	
28	(France) Gaël Julien	(France) Graff Racing						**2**	18	
29	(United States) Wyatt Brichacek (United Kingdom) Chris Short	(United Kingdom) RLR Msport				3			15	
30	(United Arab Emirates) Alexander Bukhantsov	(Poland) Inter Europol Competition	4	10		9			15	
31	(France) Sébastien Morales	(France) Cogemo Racing Team	Ret	6	7	18		19	15	
32	(Australia) Nathan Kumar	(Italy) TS Corse	11	5	11	20	18	9	14	
33	(United Kingdom) Tim Creswick	(Poland) Inter Europol Competition	4			24			12.5	
34	(France) Philippe Cimadomo	(France) MV2S	18	Ret	14	5	25†	27	12	
35	(France) Tim Merieux	(France) MV2S			14	5	25†	27	11.6	
36	(France) Antoine Lacoste	(France) Cogemo Racing Team	7	8		21	11		10.5	
37	(Italy) Gianluca Giraudi (United Kingdom) Ayrton Simmons	(Italy) TS Corse		5					10	
38	(France) Erwin Creed (France) Mathis Poulet	(France) ANS Motorsport	26	13	Ret	19	17	7	8	
39	(France) Paul Trojani	(France) ANS Motorsport	24	11		26		7	7.5	
40	(France) Thomas Laurent	(France) Cogemo Racing Team		8					4	
41	(Switzerland) Danny Buntschu	(France) Lamo Racing	15	9	**15**	DNS	15	12	4	
42	(France) Fred Morel	(France) Lamo Racing	15	9	**15**				3.5	
42	(France) Fred Morel	(France) ANS Motorsport					17		3.5	
LMP3
1	(Switzerland) Axel Gnos (Greece) Georgios Kolovos	(Poland) Team Virage	10	1	2	8	9	13	100	
2	(Spain) Daniel Maciá (France) Raphaël Narac (Poland) Jacek Zielonka	(Poland) Team Virage	3	Ret	**4**	6	8	8	97	
3	(Mozambique) Pedro Perino	(Poland) Inter Europol Competition	4	10		**9**	**7**	3	95	
4	(France) Sacha Lehmann	(Poland) Team Virage		1	2	8	9	13	90	
5	(Australia) Nathan Kumar	(Italy) TS Corse	11	5	11	20	18	**9**	72	
6	(Netherlands) Dane Arendsen	(Poland) Inter Europol Competition				24	**7**	3	52	
7	(France) Romain Favre	(Poland) Inter Europol Competition					**7**	3	50	
8	(United Arab Emirates) Alexander Bukhantsov	(Poland) Inter Europol Competition	4	10		**9**			45	
9	(Canada) James Dayson	(United Kingdom) RLR MSport	5			3			40	
10	(France) Marius Fossard	(Czech Republic) Bretton Racing	13	**12**					32	
10	(France) Marius Fossard	(Poland) Team Virage				16		18	32	
11	(France) Nicolas Chartier (Switzerland) Stephan Rupp	(Germany) Reiter Engineering	19	17	20	Ret	21	22	32	
12	(United Kingdom) George King	(France) Graff Racing		18					31	
12	(United Kingdom) George King	(Italy) TS Corse			11		18		31	
13	(France) Vincent Capillaire	(Germany) Reiter Engineering	19	17	20	Ret	21		28	
14	(United States) Wyatt Brichacek (United Kingdom) Chris Short	(United Kingdom) RLR Msport				3			25	
15	(Switzerland) Adrien Closmenil	(Switzerland) Cool Racing	**9**			25		11	25	
16	(France) Julien Lemoine	(France) ANS Motorsport	24	11	19	26			23.5	25
17	(Italy) Francesco Simonazzi	(Italy) TS Corse				20		9	21	
18	(United Kingdom) Tim Creswick	(Poland) Inter Europol Competition	4			24			20	
19	(France) Nico Prost	(France) CMR	Ret	Ret		28	12	21	18.5	
20	(France) Gwenael Delomier	(France) CMR		Ret		28	12	21	18.5	
21	(Italy) Gianluca Giraudi (United Kingdom) Ayrton Simmons	(Italy) TS Corse		5					18	
22	(Greece) Paris Stavrakidis	(Poland) Team Virage				16		18	16	
23	(Mexico) Ian Aguilera	(United Kingdom) RLR MSport	5						15	
24	(Romania) Robert Vișoiu	(Italy) TS Corse						9	15	
25	(Netherlands) Niels Koolen	(Poland) Inter Europol Competition		10					15	
26	(Singapore) Danial Frost	(Italy) TS Corse			11				15	
27	(Germany) Dominik Schraml	(Switzerland) Racing Spirit of Léman		25†					14.5	
27	(Germany) Dominik Schraml	(Switzerland) Haegeli by T2 Racing			16			23	14.5	
28	(Germany) Sebastian Schmitt	(Switzerland) Haegeli by T2 Racing			16			23	14	
29	(France) Paul Trojani	(France) ANS Motorsport	24	11		26			13.5	
30	(France) David Droux (Belgium) Quentin Joseph	(Switzerland) Cool Racing				25		11	13	
31	(Switzerland) Cédric Oltramare	(Switzerland) Cool Racing	**9**						12	
32	(United Kingdom) Kai Askey	(Poland) Inter Europol Competition				**9**			12	
33	(Netherlands) Marcel Oosenbrugh	(Switzerland) Haegeli by T2 Racing			16				12	
34	(Greece) Panagiotis Kaitatzis	(Poland) Team Virage	10						10	
35	(Italy) Alessandro Bressan (Denmark) Theodor Jensen (United Kingdom) Ben Stone	(Czech Republic) Bretton Racing				10			10	
36	(Portugal) Manuel Espírito Santo (Portugal) Bernardo Pinheiro	(Czech Republic) Bretton Racing		**12**					10	
37	(France) Clément Moreno	(France) ANS Motorsport			19				10	25
38	(United Arab Emirates) Alim Geshev	(Italy) TS Corse					18		10	
39	(Denmark) Theodor Jensen (Italy) "Valerio"	(Italy) TS Corse	11						8	
40	(Canada) Bertrand Godin	(Poland) Team Virage				16			8	
41	(United Kingdom) Hadyn Chance	(Poland) Team Virage						18	8	
42	(Austria) Michael Doppelmayr (Germany) Elia Erhart (Germany) Pierre Kaffer	(Switzerland) Racing Spirit of Léman				27	23	26	7.5	
43	Vyacheslav Gutak (Czech Republic) Dan Skočdopole	(Czech Republic) Bretton Racing	13						6	
44	(Switzerland) Samir Ben (China) Haowen Luo	(France) Graff Racing		18					6	
45	(Spain) Daniel Nogales	(Italy) TS Corse				20			6	
46	(France) Franck Chappard (France) Willyam Gosselin (United Kingdom) Chris Short	(Spain) CD Sport		22†					4	
47	(Canada) Adam Ali (Canada) Daniel Ali (United Kingdom) Matthew Richard Bell	(Italy) EuroInternational				23			4	
48	(Austria) Martin Böhm (Austria) Andreas Fojtik	(Austria) MG Sound Speed Division	21	23	Ret	Ret		Ret	4	50
49	(Austria) Felix Neuhofer	(Switzerland) Haegeli by T2 Racing						23	2	
50	(Denmark) Sebastian Gravlund	(Poland) Inter Europol Competition				24			2	
51	(United Kingdom) Mike Simpson	(France) CMR	27†	24					1.5	
52	(United Kingdom) Andrew Bentley (United Kingdom) Sennan Fielding	(France) CMR		24					1	
53	(Germany) Christian Gisy (Germany) Ralf Kelleners	(Switzerland) Racing Spirit of Léman		25†		Ret		Ret	0.5	
54	(Germany) Sebastian Schmitz	(Switzerland) Racing Spirit of Léman		25†					0.5	
55	(United Kingdom) Freddie Tomlinson (United Kingdom) Lawrence Tomlinson	(France) CMR	27†						0.5	
56	(Australia) George Nakas (Australia) Fraser Ross (United Kingdom) James Sweatnam	(Australia) GG Classics				29			0.5	
	(France) Fabien Michal	(France) CMR	Ret	Ret					0	
	(France) Fabien Michal	(France) R-ace GP				WD			0	
	(Italy) Sergio Campana (Italy) Francesco Dracone	(United Kingdom) BHK Motorsport		Ret					0	
	(United States) Jon Brownson (Germany) Laurents Hörr (China) Pengcheng Ye (France) Benjamin Rouget	(Luxembourg) DKR Engineering		Ret					0	
	(Slovakia) Miro Konôpka (Slovakia) Zdeno Mikulasko (Hungary) Balazs Volenter	(Slovakia) ARC Bratislava			Ret				0	
	(France) Hadrien David (France) Romano Ricci	(France) R-ace GP				WD			0	
NP02
1	(Switzerland) Luis Sanjuan (France) Eric Trouillet	(France) Graff Racing	1	7	Ret	2	2	**2**	89	
2	(France) Jesse Bouhet	(France) Cogemo Racing Team	7	8	3	22	11	1	67.5	
3	(United Kingdom) James Winslow	(France) Graff Racing	28	2	5	1	16	Ret	66	
4	(Australia) John Corbett	(France) Graff Racing		2	5	1	16	Ret	65.5	
5	(France) Yohan Rossel	(France) Cogemo Racing Team	7		3			1	55	
6	(France) David Droux	(France) Graff Racing	1	7	Ret		2		53	
7	(France) Nicolas Maulini	(Switzerland) Racing Spirit of Léman	6	21	9	4	3	15	52	
8	(France) Christophe Cresp (France) Pierre-Alexandre Provost	(France) MV2S	Ret	4	8	14	4	4	52	
9	(Switzerland) Jacques Wolff	(Switzerland) Racing Spirit of Léman	6	21		4	3	15	46	
10	(Switzerland) Loris Kyburz	(France) Graff Racing	**2**	14	13	2	10	20	45.5	
11	(Monaco) Marc Faggionato (Switzerland) Karen Gaillard (France) Iko Segret	(France) ANS Motorsport	8	15	6	7	24†	5	45.5	
12	(France) Thomas Imbourg (South Africa) Jonathan Thomas	(Spain) CD Sport	23	**20**	1	**15**	**13**†	6	39	
13	(United Kingdom) Nick Adcock (Denmark) Michael Jensen	(Spain) CD Sport	16	3		12	6	Ret	34	0
14	(France) Denis Caillon (France) Philippe Thirion	(France) Cogemo Racing Team	Ret	6	7	18	5	19	33	125
15	(France) Christophe Carriere (France) Maxence Maurice	(Spain) CD Sport	26	Ret	10	21	1	14	32	
16	(France) Louis Maurice	(Spain) CD Sport		Ret	10	21	1	14	30	
17	(France) Yann Zimmer	(France) Graff Racing	**2**						26	
17	(France) Yann Zimmer	(France) Lamo Racing				DNS			26	
17	(France) Yann Zimmer	(Spain) CD Sport					6		26	
18	(United Arab Emirates) Alim Geshev	(France) Graff Racing	28	2					25.5	
19	(France) Marlon Hernandez	(France) Cogemo Racing Team						1		25
20	(France) Antoine Lacoste	(France) Cogemo Racing Team	7	8		22	11		24.5	
21	(Mexico) Ian Aguilera	(Spain) CD Sport		3		12			24	
22	(France) Sébastien Morales	(France) Cogemo Racing Team	Ret	6	7	18		19	23	100
23	(France) Louis Rossi	(France) Graff Racing	**2**	14				28†	20	
24	(France) Frédéric Croullet	(France) ANS Motorsport	12	16	12	11	14	10	19.5	79
25	(France) Gaël Julien	(France) Graff Racing						**2**	18	
26	(Switzerland) Danny Buntschu	(France) Lamo Racing	15	9	**15**	DNS	15	12	15	
27	(France) Philippe Cimadomo	(France) MV2S	18	Ret	14	5	25†	27†	14.5	18
28	(France) Tim Merieux	(France) MV2S			14	5	25†	27†	13.5	
29	(France) Erwin Creed (France) Mathis Poulet	(France) ANS Motorsport	26	13	Ret	19	17	7	13.5	
30	(France) Fred Morel	(France) Lamo Racing	15	9	**15**				11	
30	(France) Fred Morel	(France) ANS Motorsport					17		11	
31	(Switzerland) Kevin Rabin	(France) Lamo Racing			**15**				11	
31	(Switzerland) Kevin Rabin	(France) Graff Racing				13	10	20	11	
32	(France) Nicolas Schatz	(France) ANS Motorsport				11			8	
33	(France) Thomas Laurent	(France) Cogemo Racing Team		8					8	
34	(France) Rémy Deguffroy	(France) Graff Racing			13		10	28†	7.5	
35	(Switzerland) Benjamin Monnay	(Switzerland) Racing Spirit of Léman		21	9				6.5	
36	(France) Alban Nerguti (Monaco) Stéphane Ortelli	(France) Nerguti Competition	14	Ret					6	
37	(France) Philippe Mondolot	(France) ANS Motorsport	26	13	Ret	19			5	
38	(France) Rodolphe Rosati	(France) ANS Motorsport	12	16	12		14		5.5	79
39	(Switzerland) Sacha Clavadetscher	(France) Lamo Racing					15	12	4.5	
40	(United Kingdom) George King	(France) Graff Racing				13		28†	4.5	
41	(United Kingdom) Kai Askey	(France) Cogemo Racing Team					11		4	
42	(France) Nico Ferrarin	(France) Lamo Racing						12	4	
43	(Taiwan) Chun-Ting Chou	(France) Graff Racing				13			4	
44	(France) Jonathan Correrella	(France) Lamo Racing	15						4	
45	(Switzerland) Sebastien Page	(France) Graff Racing		14	13			20	3.5	
46	(France) Jean-Marc Alaphilippe (France) Alexandre Lafourcade	(France) Lamo Racing	17	19	18	17	Ret	16	3	0
47	(France) Quentin Antonel	(France) Lamo Racing	17	19	18	17		16	3	
48	(France) Daniel Bassora	(France) DB Autosport	20	Ret	17	31	20	29†	2.5	30
49	(France) Quentin Bassora	(France) DB Autosport	20	Ret	17	31	20	17	2.5	30
50	(France) Paul Alberto	(Spain) CD Sport	16						2	
51	(France) Stéphane Perrin	(France) Lamo Racing	17						1	
52	(France) Adrien Bastide	(France) DB Autosport	22				22†	17	1	
53	(France) Marc Bonnet (France) Benjamin Redais	(France) Extreme Limite					19	25	1	
54	(France) Philippe Yschard	(France) DB Autosport	22				20		1	15
55	(Switzerland) Mathias Beche	(France) DB Autosport	20	Ret		31	22†	29†	1	
56	(France) Adrien Yvon (France) Alexandre Yvon (France) Jean-François Yvon	(France) ANS Motorsport					25	24	1	18
57	(France) Clément Moreno	(France) MV2S	18	Ret					0.5	18
58	(Mexico) Sebastián Álvarez	(France) Cogemo Racing Team				22			0.5	
59	(France) Kevin Bole Besançon	(Spain) CD Sport	26						0.5	
60	(France) William Cavailhes (France) David Cristini (France) David Delucinge	(France) DB Autosport		Ret		30			0.5	18
	(France) Christopher Brenier	(France) DB Autosport		Ret					0	
	(Australia) Roman Krumins (United Kingdom) Maximus Mayer	(France) MV2S		Ret					0	
	(Switzerland) Caryl Fritsche	(France) Lamo Racing				DNS			0	
Pos.	Drivers	Team	(France) LEC1	(Portugal) ALG	(Germany) HOC	(Italy) MUG	(France) MAG	(France) LEC2	Points	UC

Key
Colour	Result
Gold	Winner
Silver	Second place
Bronze	Third place
Green	Other points position
Blue	Other classified position
Blue	Not classified, finished (NC)
Purple	Not classified, retired (Ret)
Red	Did not qualify (DNQ)
Red	Did not pre-qualify (DNPQ)
Black	Disqualified (DSQ)
White	Did not start (DNS)
White	Race cancelled (C)
Blank	Did not practice (DNP)
Blank	Excluded (EX)
Blank	Did not arrive (DNA)
Blank	Withdrawn (WD)
Blank	Did not enter (cell empty)
Text formatting	Meaning
**Bold**	Pole position
Italics	Fastest lap

† – Drivers did not finish the race, but were classified as they completed over 75% of the class winner's race distance.

==== Teams' Championship ====
Pos.	Team	(France) LEC1	(Portugal) ALG	(Germany) HOC	(Italy) MUG	(France) MAG	(France) LEC2	Points
LMP3
1	(Poland) Team Virage	3	1	2	6	8	8	129
2	(Poland) Inter Europol Competition	4	10		9	7	3	95
3	(Italy) TS Corse	11	5	11	19	18	9	72
4	(United Kingdom) RLR Msport	5			3			40
5	(Germany) Reiter Engineering	19	17	20	Ret	21	22	32
6	(Czech Republic) Bretton Racing	13	12		10			26
7	(Switzerland) Cool Racing	9			25		11	25
8	(France) ANS Motorsport	24	11	19	26			23.5
9	(France) CMR	27	24		Ret	12	21	19.5
10	(Switzerland) Haegeli by T2 Racing			16			23	14
11	(Switzerland) Racing Spirit of Léman		25†		27	23	26	8
12	(Austria) MG Sound Speed Division	21	23	Ret	Ret		Ret	4
13	(Spain) CD Sport		22†					4
14	(Italy) EuroInternational				23			4
15	(Australia) GG Classics				29			0.5
	(United Kingdom) BHK Motorsport		Ret					0
	(Luxembourg) DKR Engineering		Ret					0
	(Slovakia) ARC Bratislava			Ret				0
	(France) R-ace GP				WD			0
NP02
1	(France) Graff Racing	1	2	5	1	2	2	126
2	(Spain) CD Sport	16	3	1	12	1	6	86
3	(France) Cogemo Racing Team	7	6	3	18	5	1	77.5
4	(France) MV2S	18	4	8	5	4	4	62.5
5	(Switzerland) Racing Spirit of Léman	6	21	9	4	3	15	52.5
6	(France) ANS Motorsport	8	13	6	7	14	5	49
7	(France) Lamo Racing	15	9	15	17	15	12	16
8	(France) Nerguti Competition	14	Ret					6
9	(France) DB Autosport	20	Ret	17	30	20	17	2.5
Pos.	Team	(France) LEC1	(Portugal) ALG	(Germany) HOC	(Italy) MUG	(France) MAG	(France) LEC2	Points

== GT Endurance Cup ==
The Ultimate GT Endurance Cup was open to GT3, GT4, single-make series (Porsche Carrera Cup, Ferrari Challenge, Lamborghini Super Trofeo), TCR cars.

=== Teams and drivers ===
Team	Chassis	Engine	No.	Drivers	Rounds
UCS1
(France) Visiom	Ferrari 488 GT3 Evo 2020	Ferrari 3.9 L Twin-Turbo V8	1	(France) Jean-Bernard Bouvet	All
(France) Visiom	Ferrari 488 GT3 Evo 2020	Ferrari 3.9 L Twin-Turbo V8	1	(France) Jean-Paul Pagny	All
(France) Visiom	Ferrari 488 GT3 Evo 2020	Ferrari 3.9 L Twin-Turbo V8	1	(France) David Hallyday	1–2, 4–5
(France) Visiom	Ferrari 488 GT3 Evo 2020	Ferrari 3.9 L Twin-Turbo V8	1	(France) Romain Iannetta	3, 6
(Antigua and Barbuda) HAAS RT	Audi R8 LMS Evo II	Audi DAR 5.2 L V10	4	(Belgium) Xavier Knauf	6
(Antigua and Barbuda) HAAS RT	Audi R8 LMS Evo II	Audi DAR 5.2 L V10	4	(Belgium) Gregory Servais	6
(France) Vortex	Vortex 2.0	Chevrolet 6.2 L V8	20	(France) Olivier Gomez	2–6
(France) Vortex	Vortex 2.0	Chevrolet 6.2 L V8	20	(France) Arnaud Gomez	2–5
(France) Vortex	Vortex 2.0	Chevrolet 6.2 L V8	20	(France) Sébastien Loeb	6
(France) Vortex	Vortex 2.0	Chevrolet 6.2 L V8	21	(France) Cyril Calmon	1–2, 6
(France) Vortex	Vortex 2.0	Chevrolet 6.2 L V8	21	(France) Philippe Bonnel	1, 6
(France) Vortex	Vortex 2.0	Chevrolet 6.2 L V8	21	(France) Miguel Moiola	1
(France) Vortex	Vortex 2.0	Chevrolet 6.2 L V8	21	(France) Solenn Amrouche	2, 5
(France) Vortex	Vortex 2.0	Chevrolet 6.2 L V8	21	(France) Lionel Amrouche	4–5
(France) Vortex	Vortex 2.0	Chevrolet 6.2 L V8	21	(France) Pierre Fontaine	4, 6
(France) Vortex	Vortex 2.0	Chevrolet 6.2 L V8	21	(France) Vincent Congnet	4
(France) Vortex	Vortex 2.0	Chevrolet 6.2 L V8	21	(France) Laurene Godey	6
(France) Vortex	Vortex 2.0	Chevrolet 6.2 L V8	22	(France) Vincent Congnet	5–6
(France) Vortex	Vortex 2.0	Chevrolet 6.2 L V8	22	(France) Philippe Bonnel	5
(France) Vortex	Vortex 2.0	Chevrolet 6.2 L V8	22	(France) Philippe Fertoret	6
(France) Vortex	Vortex 2.0	Chevrolet 6.2 L V8	22	(France) Miguel Moiola	6
(Slovakia) ARC Bratislava	Lamborghini Huracán GT3 Evo	Lamborghini DGF 5.2 L V10	77	(Slovakia) Adam Konôpka	3
(Slovakia) ARC Bratislava	Lamborghini Huracán GT3 Evo	Lamborghini DGF 5.2 L V10	77	(Slovakia) Miro Konôpka	3
(Germany) Vimana by GetSpeed	Mercedes-AMG GT3 Evo	Mercedes-AMG M159 6.2 L V8	108	(United Kingdom) Tom Jackson	4, 6
(Germany) Vimana by GetSpeed	Mercedes-AMG GT3 Evo	Mercedes-AMG M159 6.2 L V8	108	(Zimbabwe) Ameerh Naran	4, 6
UCS2
(France) Pegasus Racing	Lamborghini Huracán Super Trofeo Evo 2	Lamborghini 5.2 L V10	74	(France) Anthony Nahra	3
(France) Pegasus Racing	Lamborghini Huracán Super Trofeo Evo 2	Lamborghini 5.2 L V10	74	(France) Julien Schell	3
UCS3
(France) CMR	Ginetta G56 GTX	GM LS3 6.2 L V8	12	(United Kingdom) Freddie Tomlinson	5
(France) CMR	Ginetta G56 GTX	GM LS3 6.2 L V8	12	(United Kingdom) Lawrence Tomlinson	5
(France) XP Racing	Ferrari 488 Challenge Evo	Ferrari 3.9 L Turbo V8	29	(France) Roland Marchix	1–2
(France) XP Racing	Ferrari 488 Challenge Evo	Ferrari 3.9 L Turbo V8	29	(France) Philippe Papin	1–2
(France) XP Racing	Ferrari 488 Challenge Evo	Ferrari 3.9 L Turbo V8	29	(France) Xavier Pompidou	1–2
(France) Signatech Alpine	Alpine A110 GT4 Evo	Alpine 1.4 L I4	36	(France) Julien Gilbert	6
(France) Signatech Alpine	Alpine A110 GT4 Evo	Alpine 1.4 L I4	36	(France) Jean Mathieu Leandri	6
(France) Signatech Alpine	Alpine A110 GT4 Evo	Alpine 1.4 L I4	36	(France) Jim Pla	6
(France) Vortex	Vortex 1.0	Chevrolet 6.2 L V8	701	(France) Christophe Derouineau	All
(France) Vortex	Vortex 1.0	Chevrolet 6.2 L V8	701	(France) Stéphane Gouverneur	All
(France) Vortex	Vortex 1.0	Chevrolet 6.2 L V8	701	(France) Jimmy Luminier	All
(France) Vortex	Vortex 1.0	Chevrolet 6.2 L V8	701	(Luxembourg) Alex Di Bernardini	6
Porsche Cup
(France) 2B Autosport	Porsche 992 GT3 Cup	Porsche 4.0 L Flat-6	7	(France) Olivier Favre	All
(France) 2B Autosport	Porsche 992 GT3 Cup	Porsche 4.0 L Flat-6	7	(France) Yann Penlou	All
(France) 2B Autosport	Porsche 992 GT3 Cup	Porsche 4.0 L Flat-6	7	(France) Romain Favre	1–3, 5–6
(France) 2B Autosport	Porsche 992 GT3 Cup	Porsche 4.0 L Flat-6	7	(France) Hugo Chevalier	4, 6
(France) 2B Autosport	Porsche 992 GT3 Cup	Porsche 4.0 L Flat-6	14	(France) César Vandewoestyne	1–4
(France) 2B Autosport	Porsche 992 GT3 Cup	Porsche 4.0 L Flat-6	14	(France) Karl Vandewoestyne	1–4
(France) 2B Autosport	Porsche 992 GT3 Cup	Porsche 4.0 L Flat-6	14	(France) Hughes Vandewoestyne	1, 4
(France) 2B Autosport	Porsche 992 GT3 Cup	Porsche 4.0 L Flat-6	417	(France) Jean-Pierre Ancelin	6
(France) 2B Autosport	Porsche 992 GT3 Cup	Porsche 4.0 L Flat-6	417	(France) Philippe Chatelet	6
(France) 2B Autosport	Porsche 992 GT3 Cup	Porsche 4.0 L Flat-6	417	(France) Frédéric Greuillet	6
(France) Net'Cuv Racing Team	Porsche 991 GT3 Cup II	Porsche 4.0 L Flat-6	29	(France) Ulric Amado	4
(France) Net'Cuv Racing Team	Porsche 991 GT3 Cup II	Porsche 4.0 L Flat-6	29	(France) Michael Desmaele	4
(France) Martinet by Alméras	Porsche 992 GT3 Cup	Porsche 4.0 L Flat-6	71	(France) Pierre Martinet	1–2, 4–5
(France) Martinet by Alméras	Porsche 992 GT3 Cup	Porsche 4.0 L Flat-6	71	(France) Gérard Tremblay	1–2, 4–5
(France) Martinet by Alméras	Porsche 992 GT3 Cup	Porsche 4.0 L Flat-6	71	(France) Victor Bernier	1, 4
(France) Martinet by Alméras	Porsche 992 GT3 Cup	Porsche 4.0 L Flat-6	71	(France) Marlon Hernandez	2, 5
(France) Martinet by Alméras	Porsche 992 GT3 Cup	Porsche 4.0 L Flat-6	95	(France) Mathys Jaubert	1
(France) Martinet by Alméras	Porsche 992 GT3 Cup	Porsche 4.0 L Flat-6	95	(France) Marlon Hernandez	1
(France) Martinet by Alméras	Porsche 992 GT3 Cup	Porsche 4.0 L Flat-6	95	(France) Cédric Mezard	1
(France) GP Racing Team	Porsche 992 GT3 Cup	Porsche 4.0 L Flat-6	89	(France) Anthony Beltoise	All
(France) GP Racing Team	Porsche 992 GT3 Cup	Porsche 4.0 L Flat-6	89	(France) Gabriel Pemeant	All
(France) GP Racing Team	Porsche 992 GT3 Cup	Porsche 4.0 L Flat-6	89	(France) Loïc Teire	All
(France) GP Racing Team	Porsche 992 GT3 Cup	Porsche 4.0 L Flat-6	89	(France) Victor Bernier	6
(France) Mirage Racing	Porsche 991 GT3 Cup II	Porsche 4.0 L Flat-6	91	(France) Jean-Jacques Ardilly	2
(France) Mirage Racing	Porsche 991 GT3 Cup II	Porsche 4.0 L Flat-6	91	(France) Guillaume Bruot	2
(France) Mirage Racing	Porsche 991 GT3 Cup II	Porsche 4.0 L Flat-6	91	(France) Thibaud Carrai	2
(France) Seb Lajoux Racing	Porsche 992 GT3 Cup	Porsche 4.0 L Flat-6	288	(France) Jean-Paul Dominici	6
(France) Seb Lajoux Racing	Porsche 992 GT3 Cup	Porsche 4.0 L Flat-6	288	(France) François Jabukowski	6
(France) Seb Lajoux Racing	Porsche 992 GT3 Cup	Porsche 4.0 L Flat-6	288	(France) Laurent Roncaglia	6
(France) Seb Lajoux Racing	Porsche 992 GT3 Cup	Porsche 4.0 L Flat-6	288	(France) Lucas Valkre	6
(France) Seb Lajoux Racing	Porsche 992 GT3 Cup	Porsche 4.0 L Flat-6	888	(France) Sébastien Lajoux	5–6
(France) Seb Lajoux Racing	Porsche 992 GT3 Cup	Porsche 4.0 L Flat-6	888	(France) Mathieu Martins	5–6
(France) Seb Lajoux Racing	Porsche 992 GT3 Cup	Porsche 4.0 L Flat-6	888	(France) Stéphane Perrin	5–6
(France) Seb Lajoux Racing	Porsche 992 GT3 Cup	Porsche 4.0 L Flat-6	888	(France) Louis Perrot	6
(France) Seb Lajoux Racing	Porsche 992 GT3 Cup	Porsche 4.0 L Flat-6	908	(France) Nicolas Caumon	2
(France) Seb Lajoux Racing	Porsche 992 GT3 Cup	Porsche 4.0 L Flat-6	908	(France) Sébastien Lajoux	2
(France) Seb Lajoux Racing	Porsche 992 GT3 Cup	Porsche 4.0 L Flat-6	908	(France) Stéphane Perrin	2
(Germany) PROsport Racing	Porsche 992 GT3 Cup	Porsche 4.0 L Flat-6	901	(Belgium) Simon Balcaen	6
(Germany) PROsport Racing	Porsche 992 GT3 Cup	Porsche 4.0 L Flat-6	901	(Belgium) Alex Hommerson	6
(Germany) PROsport Racing	Porsche 992 GT3 Cup	Porsche 4.0 L Flat-6	901	(France) Steven Palette	6
UCS4
(France) GL Racing Team	Audi R8 LMS GT4 Evo	Audi 5.2 L V10	13	(France) Philippe Cosi	1–2
(France) GL Racing Team	Audi R8 LMS GT4 Evo	Audi 5.2 L V10	13	(France) Ahmed Henni	1
(France) GL Racing Team	Audi R8 LMS GT4 Evo	Audi 5.2 L V10	13	(France) Herve Alloro	2
(France) L'Espace Bienvenue	BMW M4 GT4 Gen II	BMW 3.0 L Twin-Turbo I6	17	(Belgium) Daniel Waszczinsky	All
(France) L'Espace Bienvenue	BMW M4 GT4 Gen II	BMW 3.0 L Twin-Turbo I6	17	(France) Régis Rego de Sebes	1–4, 6
(France) L'Espace Bienvenue	BMW M4 GT4 Gen II	BMW 3.0 L Twin-Turbo I6	17	(Belgium) Benjamin Lessennes	5–6
(France) CMR	Ginetta G56 GT4	GM LS3 6.2 L V8	51	(France) Hugo Mogica	4
(France) CMR	Ginetta G56 GT4	GM LS3 6.2 L V8	51	(France) Laurent Mogica	4
(France) CMR	Ginetta G56 GT4	GM LS3 6.2 L V8	51	(France) Thibaut Mogica	4
(France) Team Speedcar	Audi R8 LMS GT4 Evo	Audi 5.2 L V10	83	(France) Julien Ripert	1
(France) Team Speedcar	Audi R8 LMS GT4 Evo	Audi 5.2 L V10	83	(France) Philippe Thalamy	1
UCS Light
(France) Chazel Technologie Course	Alpine A110 Cup	Alpine 1.4 L I4	19	(France) Julien Bounie	All
(France) Chazel Technologie Course	Alpine A110 Cup	Alpine 1.4 L I4	19	(France) Benoit Marion	All
(France) Chazel Technologie Course	Alpine A110 Cup	Alpine 1.4 L I4	19	(France) Olivier Martinez	All
(France) Chazel Technologie Course	Alpine A110 Cup	Alpine 1.4 L I4	19	(France) Raphael Cuadrado	6
(France) Chazel Technologie Course	Alpine A110 Cup	Alpine 1.4 L I4	93	(France) Marc Jacob	All
(France) Chazel Technologie Course	Alpine A110 Cup	Alpine 1.4 L I4	93	(France) Marc Lopes	All
(France) Chazel Technologie Course	Alpine A110 Cup	Alpine 1.4 L I4	93	(France) Antoni de Barn	1, 3, 6
(France) Chazel Technologie Course	Alpine A110 Cup	Alpine 1.4 L I4	93	(France) Bruno Servazeix	2, 5–6
(France) Chazel Technologie Course	Alpine A110 Cup	Alpine 1.4 L I4	93	(France) Benoit Rousset	4
(France) Chazel Technologie Course	Alpine A110 Cup	Alpine 1.4 L I4	94	(France) Jean-François Succi	6
(France) Chazel Technologie Course	Alpine A110 Cup	Alpine 1.4 L I4	94	(France) Charles Zuccarelli	6
(France) Chazel Technologie Course	Alpine A110 Cup	Alpine 1.4 L I4	94	(France) Charles Nicholas Zuccarelli	6
(France) Chazel Technologie Course	Alpine A110 Cup	Alpine 1.4 L I4	110	(France) Stéphane Lipp	2–4
(France) Chazel Technologie Course	Alpine A110 Cup	Alpine 1.4 L I4	110	(France) Guillaume Masset	2–3, 6
(France) Chazel Technologie Course	Alpine A110 Cup	Alpine 1.4 L I4	110	(France) Félix Crepet	2, 4, 6
(France) Chazel Technologie Course	Alpine A110 Cup	Alpine 1.4 L I4	110	(France) Michel Abattu	2, 4
(France) Chazel Technologie Course	Alpine A110 Cup	Alpine 1.4 L I4	110	(France) Louka Desgranges	6
(France) Chazel Technologie Course	Alpine A110 Cup	Alpine 1.4 L I4	123	(France) Frederic de Badant	2
(France) Chazel Technologie Course	Alpine A110 Cup	Alpine 1.4 L I4	123	(France) Jean-Louis Dauger	2

=== Race results ===
Bold indicates overall winner.

Round	Circuit	Pole Position	UCS1 Winning Car	UCS2 Winning Car	UCS3 Winning Car	Porsche Cup Winning Car	UCS4 Winning Car	UCS Light Winning Car
Round	Circuit	Pole Position	UCS1 Winning Drivers	UCS2 Winning Drivers	UCS3 Winning Drivers	Porsche Cup Winning Drivers	UCS4 Winning Drivers	UCS Light Winning Drivers
1	(France) Paul Ricard	(France) No. 1 Visiom	**(France) No. 1 Visiom**	No entries	(France) No. 701 Vortex	(France) No. 95 Martinet by Alméras	(France) No. 17 L'Espace Bienvenue	(France) No. 19 Chazel Technologie Course
1	(France) Paul Ricard	(France) Jean-Bernard Bouvet (France) David Hallyday (France) Jean-Paul Pagny	**(France) Jean-Bernard Bouvet** **(France) David Hallyday** **(France) Jean-Paul Pagny**	No entries	(France) Christophe Derouineau (France) Stéphane Gouverneur (France) Jimmy Luminier	(France) Mathys Jaubert (France) Marlon Hernandez (France) Cédric Mezard	(France) Régis Rego de Sebes (Belgium) Daniel Waszczinsky	(France) Julien Bounie (France) Benoit Marion (France) Olivier Martinez
2	(Portugal) Algarve	(France) No. 20 Vortex	**(France) No. 1 Visiom**	No entries	(France) No. 701 Vortex	(France) No. 7 2B Autosport	(France) No. 17 L'Espace Bienvenue	(France) No. 19 Chazel Technologie Course
2	(Portugal) Algarve	(France) Arnaud Gomez (France) Olivier Gomez	**(France) Jean-Bernard Bouvet** **(France) David Hallyday** **(France) Jean-Paul Pagny**	No entries	(France) Christophe Derouineau (France) Stéphane Gouverneur (France) Jimmy Luminier	(France) Olivier Favre (France) Romain Favre (France) Yann Penlou	(France) Régis Rego de Sebes (Belgium) Daniel Waszczinsky	(France) Julien Bounie (France) Benoit Marion (France) Olivier Martinez
3	(Germany) Hockenheimring	(France) No. 74 Pegasus Racing	**(France) No. 1 Visiom**	No finishers	(France) No. 701 Vortex	(France) No. 89 GP Racing Team	(France) No. 17 L'Espace Bienvenue	(France) No. 19 Chazel Technologie Course
3	(Germany) Hockenheimring	(France) Anthony Nahra (France) Julien Schell	**(France) Jean-Bernard Bouvet** **(France) Romain Iannetta** **(France) Jean-Paul Pagny**	No finishers	(France) Christophe Derouineau (France) Stéphane Gouverneur (France) Jimmy Luminier	(France) Anthony Beltoise (France) Gabriel Pemeant (France) Loïc Teire	(France) Régis Rego de Sebes (Belgium) Daniel Waszczinsky	(France) Julien Bounie (France) Benoit Marion (France) Olivier Martinez
4	(Italy) Mugello	(France) No. 20 Vortex	**(Germany) No. 108 Vimana by GetSpeed**	No entries	(France) No. 701 Vortex	(France) No. 7 2B Autosport	(France) No. 17 L'Espace Bienvenue	(France) No. 19 Chazel Technologie Course
4	(Italy) Mugello	(France) Arnaud Gomez (France) Olivier Gomez	**(United Kingdom) Tom Jackson** **(Zimbabwe) Ameerh Naran**	No entries	(France) Christophe Derouineau (France) Stéphane Gouverneur (France) Jimmy Luminier	(France) Hugo Chevalier (France) Olivier Favre (France) Yann Penlou	(France) Régis Rego de Sebes (Belgium) Daniel Waszczinsky	(France) Julien Bounie (France) Benoit Marion (France) Olivier Martinez
5	(France) Magny-Cours	(France) No. 12 CMR	**(France) No. 20 Vortex**	No entries	(France) No. 12 CMR	(France) No. 888 Seb Lajoux Racing	(France) No. 17 L'Espace Bienvenue	(France) No. 19 Chazel Technologie Course
5	(France) Magny-Cours	(United Kingdom) Freddie Tomlinson (United Kingdom) Lawrence Tomlinson	**(France) Arnaud Gomez** **(France) Olivier Gomez**	No entries	(United Kingdom) Freddie Tomlinson (United Kingdom) Lawrence Tomlinson	(France) Sébastien Lajoux (France) Mathieu Martins (France) Stéphane Perrin	(Belgium) Benjamin Lessennes (Belgium) Daniel Waszczinsky	(France) Julien Bounie (France) Benoit Marion (France) Olivier Martinez
6	(France) Paul Ricard	(Antigua and Barbuda) No. 4 HAAS RT	**(Germany) No. 108 Vimana by GetSpeed**	No entries	(France) No. 36 Signatech Alpine	(France) No. 89 GP Racing Team	(France) No. 17 L'Espace Bienvenue	(France) No. 110 Chazel Technologie Course
6	(France) Paul Ricard	(Belgium) Xavier Knauf (Belgium) Gregory Servais	**(United Kingdom) Tom Jackson** **(Zimbabwe) Ameerh Naran**	No entries	(France) Julien Gilbert (France) Jean Mathieu Leandri (France) Jim Pla	(France) Anthony Beltoise (France) Victor Bernier (France) Gabriel Pemeant (France) Loïc Teire	(France) Régis Rego de Sebes (Belgium) Benjamin Lessennes (Belgium) Daniel Waszczinsky	(France) Félix Crepet (France) Louka Desgranges (France) Guillaume Masset

=== Championship standings ===
==== Drivers' standings ====
Pos.	Drivers	Team	(France) LEC1	(Portugal) ALG	(Germany) HOC	(Italy) MUG	(France) MAG	(France) LEC2	Points
Overall
1	(France) Jean-Bernard Bouvet (France) Jean-Paul Pagny	(France) Visiom	**1**	1	1	3	2	2	126
2	(France) David Hallyday	(France) Visiom	**1**	1		3	2		83
3	(France) Olivier Favre (France) Yann Penlou	(France) 2B Autosport	3	2	4	4	5	4	79
4	(France) Romain Favre	(France) 2B Autosport	3	2	4		5	4	67
5	(France) Anthony Beltoise (France) Gabriel Pemeant (France) Loïc Teire	(France) GP Racing Team	5	5	2	Ret	6	3	61
6	(United Kingdom) Tom Jackson (Zimbabwe) Ameerh Naran	(Germany) Vimana by GetSpeed				1		1	50
7	(France) César Vandewoestyne (France) Karl Vandewoestyne	(France) 2B Autosport	4	3	3	6			50
8	(France) Olivier Gomez	(France) Vortex		**Ret**	Ret	**2**	1	9	45
9	(France) Romain Iannetta	(France) Visiom			1			2	43
10	(France) Arnaud Gomez	(France) Vortex		**Ret**	Ret	**2**	1		43
11	(France) Victor Bernier	(France) Martinet by Alméras	8			7			29
11	(France) Victor Bernier	(France) GP Racing Team						3	29
12	(France) Hugo Chevalier	(France) 2B Autosport				4		4	24
13	(Belgium) Daniel Waszczinsky	(France) L'Espace Bienvenue	9	8	5	12	7	10	23.5
14	(France) Sébastien Lajoux (France) Stéphane Perrin	(France) Seb Lajoux Racing		6			3	Ret	23
15	(France) Christophe Derouineau (France) Stéphane Gouverneur (France) Jimmy Luminier	(France) Vortex	6	7	8	10†	8	Ret	23
16	(France) Marlon Hernandez	(France) Martinet by Alméras	2	NC			9		20
17	(France) Hughes Vandewoestyne	(France) 2B Autosport	4			6			20
18	(France) Régis Rego de Sebes	(France) L'Espace Bienvenue	9	8	5	12		12	19.5
19	(France) Mathys Jaubert (France) Cédric Mezard	(France) Martinet by Alméras	2						18
20	(France) Julien Bounie (France) Benoit Marion (France) Olivier Martinez	(France) Chazel Technologie Course	11	9	6	8	10	12	16
UCS1
1	(France) Jean-Bernard Bouvet (France) Jean-Paul Pagny	(France) Visiom	**1**	1	1	3	2	2	126
2	(France) David Hallyday	(France) Visiom	**1**	1		3	2		83
3	(France) Olivier Gomez	(France) Vortex		**Ret**	**Ret**	**2**	**1**	9	58
4	(United Kingdom) Tom Jackson (Zimbabwe) Ameerh Naran	(Germany) Vimana by GetSpeed				1		1	50
5	(France) Romain Iannetta	(France) Visiom			1			2	43
6	(France) Arnaud Gomez	(France) Vortex		**Ret**	**Ret**	**2**	**1**		43
7	(France) Solenn Amrouche	(France) Vortex		4			11†		33
8	(France) Cyril Calmon	(France) Vortex	WD	4				Ret	18
9	(Slovakia) Adam Konôpka (Slovakia) Miro Konôpka	(Slovakia) ARC Bratislava			9†				18
10	(France) Sébastien Loeb	(France) Vortex						9	15
11	(France) Lionel Amrouche	(France) Vortex				DNS	11†		15
	(France) Vincent Congnet	(France) Vortex				DNS	DNS	Ret	0
	(France) Pierre Fontaine	(France) Vortex				DNS		Ret	0
	(France) Philippe Bonnel	(France) Vortex	WD				DNS	Ret	0
	(France) Miguel Moiola	(France) Vortex	WD					Ret	0
	(France) Philippe Fertoret	(France) Vortex						Ret	0
	(France) Laurene Godey	(France) Vortex						Ret	0
	(Belgium) Xavier Knauf (Belgium) Gregory Servais	(Antigua and Barbuda) HAAS RT						**DNS**	0
UCS2
	(France) Anthony Nahra (France) Julien Schell	(France) Pegasus Racing			**Ret**				0
UCS3
1	(France) Christophe Derouineau (France) Stéphane Gouverneur (France) Jimmy Luminier	(France) Vortex	6	**7**	**8**	**10**†	8	**Ret**	118
2	(United Kingdom) Freddie Tomlinson (United Kingdom) Lawrence Tomlinson	(France) CMR					**4**		25
3	(France) Julien Gilbert (France) Jean Mathieu Leandri (France) Jim Pla	(France) Signatech Alpine						8	25
4	(France) Roland Marchix (France) Philippe Papin (France) Xavier Pompidou	(France) XP Racing	**7**	Ret					18
PC
1	(France) Olivier Favre (France) Yann Penlou	(France) 2B Autosport	**3**	2	4	**4**	5	4	119
2	(France) Romain Favre	(France) 2B Autosport	**3**	2	4		5	4	94
3	(France) Anthony Beltoise (France) Gabriel Pemeant (France) Loïc Teire	(France) GP Racing Team	5	5	**2**	Ret	6	3	92
4	(France) César Vandewoestyne (France) Karl Vandewoestyne	(France) 2B Autosport	4	**3**	3	6			66
5	(France) Victor Bernier	(France) Martinet by Alméras	8			7			47
5	(France) Victor Bernier	(France) GP Racing Team						3	47
6	(France) Hugo Chevalier	(France) 2B Autosport				**4**		4	43
7	(France) Marlon Hernandez	(France) Martinet by Alméras	2	NC			9		37
8	(France) Sébastien Lajoux (France) Stéphane Perrin	(France) Seb Lajoux Racing		6			**3**		37
9	(France) Pierre Martinet (France) Gérard Tremblay	(France) Martinet by Alméras	8	NC		7	9		34
10	(France) Hughes Vandewoestyne	(France) 2B Autosport	4			6			30
11	(France) Mathys Jaubert (France) Cédric Mezard	(France) Martinet by Alméras	2						25
12	(France) Mathieu Martins	(France) Seb Lajoux Racing					**3**	Ret	25
13	(France) Ulric Amado (France) Michael Desmaele	(France) Net'Cuv Racing				5			18
14	(Belgium) Simon Balcaen (Belgium) Alex Hommerson (France) Steven Palette	(Germany) PROsport Racing						**5**	15
15	(France) Nicolas Caumon	(France) Seb Lajoux Racing		6					12
16	(France) Jean-Paul Dominici (France) François Jabukowski (France) Laurent Roncaglia (France) Lucas Valkre	(France) Seb Lajoux Racing						6	12
17	(France) Jean-Pierre Ancelin (France) Philippe Chatelet (France) Frédéric Greuillet	(France) 2B Autosport						7	10
	(France) Jean-Jacques Ardilly (France) Guillaume Bruot (France) Thibaud Carrai	(France) Mirage Racing		Ret					0
	(France) Louis Perrot	(France) Seb Lajoux Racing						Ret	0
UCS4
1	(Belgium) Daniel Waszczinsky	(France) L'Espace Bienvenue	**9**	**8**	**5**	**12**	**7**	**10**	150
2	(France) Régis Rego de Sebes	(France) L'Espace Bienvenue	**9**	**8**	**5**	**12**		**10**	125
3	(Belgium) Benjamin Lessennes	(France) L'Espace Bienvenue					**7**	**10**	50
4	(France) Philippe Cosi	(France) GL Racing Team	10	11					36
5	(France) Ahmed Henni	(France) GL Racing Team	10						18
6	(France) Herve Alloro	(France) GL Racing Team		11					18
7	(France) Hugo Mogica (France) Laurent Mogica (France) Thibaut Mogica	(France) CMR				13			14
	(France) Julien Ripert (France) Philippe Thalamy	(France) Team Speedcar	WD						0
UCS Light
1	(France) Julien Bounie (France) Benoit Marion (France) Olivier Martinez	(France) Chazel Technologie Course	**11**	9	6	8	**10**	**12**	143
2	(France) Marc Jacob (France) Marc Lopes	(France) Chazel Technologie Course	12	13	DNS	**9**	DNS	14	60
3	(France) Guillaume Masset	(France) Chazel Technologie Course		11	7			11	58
4	(France) Félix Crepet	(France) Chazel Technologie Course		11		**11**		11	55
5	(France) Stéphane Lipp	(France) Chazel Technologie Course		11	7	**11**			48
6	(France) Michel Abattu	(France) Chazel Technologie Course		11		**11**			30
7	(France) Antoni de Barn	(France) Chazel Technologie Course	12		DNS			14	30
8	(France) Louka Desgranges	(France) Chazel Technologie Course						11	25
9	(France) Bruno Servazeix	(France) Chazel Technologie Course		13			DNS	14	24
10	(France) Frederic de Badant (France) Jean-Louis Dauger	(France) Chazel Technologie Course		**10**					18
11	(France) Benoit Rousset	(France) Chazel Technologie Course				9			18
12	(France) Raphael Cuadrado	(France) Chazel Technologie Course						**12**	18
13	(France) Jean-François Succi (France) Charles Zuccarelli (France) Charles Nicholas Zuccarelli	(France) Chazel Technologie Course						13	15
Pos.	Drivers	Team	(France) LEC1	(Portugal) ALG	(Germany) HOC	(Italy) MUG	(France) MAG	(France) LEC2	Points

Key
Colour	Result
Gold	Winner
Silver	Second place
Bronze	Third place
Green	Other points position
Blue	Other classified position
Blue	Not classified, finished (NC)
Purple	Not classified, retired (Ret)
Red	Did not qualify (DNQ)
Red	Did not pre-qualify (DNPQ)
Black	Disqualified (DSQ)
White	Did not start (DNS)
White	Race cancelled (C)
Blank	Did not practice (DNP)
Blank	Excluded (EX)
Blank	Did not arrive (DNA)
Blank	Withdrawn (WD)
Blank	Did not enter (cell empty)
Text formatting	Meaning
**Bold**	Pole position
Italics	Fastest lap

† – Drivers did not finish the race, but were classified as they completed over 75% of the class winner's race distance.

==== Teams' standings ====
Pos.	Team	(France) LEC1	(Portugal) ALG	(Germany) HOC	(Italy) MUG	(France) MAG	(France) LEC2	Points
1	(France) 2B Autosport	**3**	2	3	**4**	5	4	113
2	(France) Vortex	6	**7**	**8**	**10**†	**1**	9	77.5
3	(France) GP Racing Team	5	5	**2**	Ret	6	3	77.5
4	(France) L'Espace Bienvenue	**9**	**8**	**5**	**12**	**7**	**10**	75
5	(France) Chazel Technologie Course	**11**	9	6	8	**10**	11	75
6	(France) Visiom	**1**	1	1	3	2	2	72
7	(France) Seb Lajoux Racing		6			**3**	6	49
8	(Germany) Vimana by GetSpeed				1		1	37.5
9	(France) Martinet by Alméras	2	NC		7	9		28
10	(France) CMR				13	**4**		21.5
11	(France) GL Racing Team	10	11					18
12	(France) Net'Cuv Racing				5			18
13	(Germany) PROsport Racing						**5**	15
14	(France) Signatech Alpine						8	12.5
15	(France) XP Racing	**7**	Ret					9
16	(Slovakia) ARC Bratislava			9†				9
	(France) Mirage Racing		Ret					0
	(France) Pegasus Racing			**Ret**				0
	(Antigua and Barbuda) HAAS RT						**DNS**	0
	(France) Team Speedcar	WD						0
Pos.	Team	(France) LEC1	(Portugal) ALG	(Germany) HOC	(Italy) MUG	(France) MAG	(France) LEC2	Points

== GT-Sprint Cup ==
The Ultimate GT-Sprint Cup was open to GT3, GT4, single-make series (Porsche Carrera Cup, Ferrari Challenge, Lamborghini Super Trofeo), TCR cars.

=== Teams and drivers ===
Team	Chassis	Engine	No.	Drivers	T	Rounds
UCS1
(France) JRM Racing Team	Corvette C7 GT3-R	Chevrolet 6.2 L V8	2	(France) Olivier Morihain		1–4
(France) JRM Racing Team	Mercedes-AMG GT3 Evo	Mercedes-AMG M159 6.2 L V8	2	(France) Olivier Morihain		6
(Italy) SR&R SRL	Ferrari 488 GT3 Evo 2020	Ferrari 3.9 L Twin-Turbo V8	3	(Italy) Francesco Atzori	T	1–2, 4, 6
(Italy) SR&R SRL	Ferrari 488 GT3 Evo 2020	Ferrari 3.9 L Twin-Turbo V8	3	(Italy) Lorenzo Bontempelli	T	1
(Italy) SR&R SRL	Ferrari 488 GT3 Evo 2020	Ferrari 3.9 L Twin-Turbo V8	3	(Italy) "Aramis"	T	2, 4, 6
(Antigua and Barbuda) HAAS RT	Audi R8 LMS Evo II	Audi DAR 5.2 L V10	4	(Belgium) Xavier Knauf		6
(France) AB Sport Auto	Renault R.S. 01 F GT3	Nissan VR38DETT 3.0 L V6	5	(France) Franck Dezoteux		6
(Belgium) BDR Competition Grupo Prom	Mercedes-AMG GT3 Evo	Mercedes-AMG M159 6.2 L V8	28	(Belgium) Amaury Bonduel		3
(France) Debard Automobiles by Racetivity	Ford GT GT3	Ford 5.0 L V8	60	(France) Hugo Chevalier		5
(France) Debard Automobiles by Racetivity	Ford GT GT3	Ford 5.0 L V8	60	(France) Eric Debard		5
(France) Debard Automobiles by Racetivity	Renault R.S. 01 F GT3	Nissan VR38DETT 3.0 L V6	83	(France) Emmanuel Collard		4
(France) Debard Automobiles by Racetivity	Renault R.S. 01 F GT3	Nissan VR38DETT 3.0 L V6	83	(France) William Teneketzian		4
(France) Krafft Racing by Turbo 2000	Chevron GR8 GT3	GM LS3 6.2 L V8	123	(France) Evan Meunier		5
(France) Krafft Racing by Turbo 2000	Chevron GR8 GT3	GM LS3 6.2 L V8	123	(France) Didier Pierrard		5
UCS2
(France) CMR	Ginetta G56 GTX	GM LS3 6.2 L V8	12	(France) Eric Mouez		2–3, 6
(France) CMR	Ginetta G56 GTX	GM LS3 6.2 L V8	12	(France) Grégory Driot		2
(France) CMR	Lamborghini Huracán Super Trofeo Evo 2	Lamborghini 5.2 L V10	30	(France) Quentin Antonel		1
(France) CMR	Lamborghini Huracán Super Trofeo Evo 2	Lamborghini 5.2 L V10	30	(France) Eric Mouez		1
(France) CMR	Lamborghini Huracán Super Trofeo Evo 2	Lamborghini 5.2 L V10	30	(France) Thierry Soave		1
(France) CMR	Lamborghini Huracán Super Trofeo Evo 2	Lamborghini 5.2 L V10	30	(France) Alexis Berthet		2, 6
(France) CMR	Lamborghini Huracán Super Trofeo Evo 2	Lamborghini 5.2 L V10	61	(France) George Cabanne		6
(France) CMR	Lamborghini Huracán Super Trofeo Evo 2	Lamborghini 5.2 L V10	62	(France) George Cabanne		1
(France) CMR	Lamborghini Huracán Super Trofeo Evo 2	Lamborghini 5.2 L V10	62	(France) Thierry Soave		1
(France) CMR	Lamborghini Huracán Super Trofeo Evo 2	Lamborghini 5.2 L V10	73	(France) Alexis Berthet		1
(France) CMR	Lamborghini Huracán Super Trofeo Evo 2	Lamborghini 5.2 L V10	73	(France) George Cabanne		1
(France) CMR	Lamborghini Huracán Super Trofeo Evo 2	Lamborghini 5.2 L V10	73	(France) Patrick Michellier		1
(Belgium) BDR Competition Grupo Prom	Lamborghini Huracán Super Trofeo Evo 2	Lamborghini 5.2 L V10	77	(Mexico) Alfredo Hernandez		2–4
UCS3
(France) CMR	Ginetta G56 GTX	GM LS3 6.2 L V8	12	(France) Grégory Driot		5
(France) CMR	Ginetta G56 GTX	GM LS3 6.2 L V8	12	(United Kingdom) Lawrence Tomlinson		5
(France) CMR	Ferrari 488 Challenge Evo	Ferrari 3.9 L Turbo V8	73	(France) Patrick Michellier	T	3–6
(France) JVO Racing	Ferrari 488 Challenge Evo	Ferrari 3.9 L Turbo V8	88	(France) Franck Kewitz	T	1
(Switzerland) Racing Spirit of Léman	Ferrari 488 Challenge Evo	Ferrari 3.9 L Turbo V8	91	(France) Frédéric Lacore	T	All
(Switzerland) Racing Spirit of Léman	Ferrari 488 Challenge Evo	Ferrari 3.9 L Turbo V8	91	(France) Kévin Parsa	T	3
(France) Vortex	Vortex 1.0	Chevrolet 6.2 L V8	95	(France) Solenn Amrouche		1–3
(Italy) AF Corse	Ferrari 488 Challenge Evo	Ferrari 3.9 L Turbo V8	105	(Japan) Motohito Isozaki	T	1
(Italy) SR&R SRL	Ferrari 488 Challenge Evo	Ferrari 3.9 L Turbo V8	333	(Italy) Francesco Coassin	T	1–2, 4
(Italy) SR&R SRL	Ferrari 488 Challenge Evo	Ferrari 3.9 L Turbo V8	333	(Italy) Lorenzo Cossu	T	1
(Italy) SR&R SRL	Ferrari 488 Challenge Evo	Ferrari 3.9 L Turbo V8	333	(Australia) Harrison Walker	T	3–4
(Italy) SR&R SRL	Ferrari 488 Challenge Evo	Ferrari 3.9 L Turbo V8	333	(Portugal) Lourenço Monteiro	T	3
(Italy) SR&R SRL	Ferrari 488 Challenge Evo	Ferrari 3.9 L Turbo V8	353	(Republic of Ireland) Lyle Schofield	T	All
(Italy) SR&R SRL	Ferrari 488 Challenge Evo	Ferrari 3.9 L Turbo V8	353	(Portugal) Lourenço Monteiro	T	1–2, 4–6
(Italy) SR&R SRL	Ferrari 488 Challenge Evo	Ferrari 3.9 L Turbo V8	353	(Italy) Francesco Coassin	T	3
Porsche Cup
(France) 2B Autosport	Porsche 991 GT3 Cup II	Porsche 4.0 L Flat-6	13	(France) César Vandewoestyne		1
(France) 2B Autosport	Porsche 992 GT3 Cup	Porsche 4.0 L Flat-6	13	(France) Julien Bourguignon		4
(France) 2B Autosport	Porsche 992 GT3 Cup	Porsche 4.0 L Flat-6	13	(France) Hughes Vandewoestyne		4
(France) 2B Autosport	Porsche 992 GT3 Cup	Porsche 4.0 L Flat-6	14	(France) Karl Vandewoestyne		1–4, 6
(France) 2B Autosport	Porsche 992 GT3 Cup	Porsche 4.0 L Flat-6	14	(France) César Vandewoestyne		2–6
(France) 2B Autosport	Porsche 992 GT3 Cup	Porsche 4.0 L Flat-6	417	(France) Jean-Pierre Ancelin		3
(France) Nad Systems by HRT	Porsche 997 GT3 Cup S	Porsche 3.6 L Flat-6	38	(France) Cédric Toison		6
(France) Debard Automobiles by Racetivity	Porsche 991 GT3 Cup II	Porsche 4.0 L Flat-6	54	(France) Paul Benezech		6
(France) Debard Automobiles by Racetivity	Porsche 992 GT3 Cup	Porsche 4.0 L Flat-6	81	(France) Eric Debard		2, 4
(France) Debard Automobiles by Racetivity	Porsche 992 GT3 Cup	Porsche 4.0 L Flat-6	81	(France) Carla Debard		5–6
(France) GP Racing Team	Porsche 992 GT3 Cup	Porsche 4.0 L Flat-6	89	(France) Lionel Rigaud		2, 4, 6
(France) GP Racing Team	Porsche 992 GT3 Cup	Porsche 4.0 L Flat-6	89	(France) Gabriel Pemeant		5
(France) GP Racing Team	Porsche 992 GT3 Cup	Porsche 4.0 L Flat-6	89	(France) Loïc Teire		5
(France) Krafft Racing	Porsche 992 GT3 Cup	Porsche 4.0 L Flat-6	122	(France) Jeremy Avellaneda		4
(France) Krafft Racing	Porsche 991 GT3 Cup I	Porsche 4.0 L Flat-6	122	(France) Dominique Guillemaut		6
(France) Spabiz Racing Team	Porsche 992 GT3 Cup	Porsche 4.0 L Flat-6	415	(France) Jérémy Faligand		1, 3
(France) Seb Lajoux Racing	Porsche 992 GT3 Cup	Porsche 4.0 L Flat-6	415	(France) Jérémy Faligand		2
(France) Seb Lajoux Racing	Porsche 992 GT3 Cup	Porsche 4.0 L Flat-6	888	(France) Sébastien Lajoux		5–6
(France) Seb Lajoux Racing	Porsche 992 GT3 Cup	Porsche 4.0 L Flat-6	888	(France) Stéphane Perrin		5–6
(France) Seb Lajoux Racing	Porsche 992 GT3 Cup	Porsche 4.0 L Flat-6	908	(France) Sébastien Lajoux		2
(France) Seb Lajoux Racing	Porsche 992 GT3 Cup	Porsche 4.0 L Flat-6	908	(France) Stéphane Perrin		2
UCS4
(France) CMR	Ginetta G56 GT4 1 Ginetta G56 GT4 Evo 5–6	GM LS3 6.2 L V8	6	(Switzerland) Adrien Stern		1, 5–6
(Switzerland) Racing Spirit of Léman	Aston Martin Vantage AMR GT4 Evo	Aston Martin 4.0 L Turbo V8	7	(France) Franck Dupuis		6
(Switzerland) Racing Spirit of Léman	Aston Martin Vantage AMR GT4 Evo	Aston Martin 4.0 L Turbo V8	7	(France) Henri Lombard		6
(Switzerland) Racing Spirit of Léman	Aston Martin Vantage AMR GT4 Evo	Aston Martin 4.0 L Turbo V8	39	(France) Baudouin Detout		3
(Portugal) RACAR Motorsport	Aston Martin Vantage AMR GT4	Aston Martin 4.0 L Turbo V8	9	(France) Mathieu Martins		1
(Portugal) RACAR Motorsport	Aston Martin Vantage AMR GT4	Aston Martin 4.0 L Turbo V8	9	(Portugal) António Marques Lopes		1
(Portugal) RACAR Motorsport	Aston Martin Vantage AMR GT4	Aston Martin 4.0 L Turbo V8	777	(Portugal) Ruben Duarte Vaquinhas		1
(Portugal) RACAR Motorsport	Aston Martin Vantage AMR GT4	Aston Martin 4.0 L Turbo V8	777	(Brazil) Roberto Faria		1
(France) L'Espace Bienvenue	BMW M4 GT4 Gen II	BMW 3.0 L Twin-Turbo I6	17	(France) "André"		6
(France) L'Espace Bienvenue	BMW M4 GT4 Gen II	BMW 3.0 L Twin-Turbo I6	17	(Netherlands) Ricardo van der Ende		6
(France) Team Speedcar	Audi R8 LMS GT4 Evo	Audi 5.2 L V10	32	(France) Julien Goujat		1, 6
(France) Team Speedcar	Audi R8 LMS GT4 Evo	Audi 5.2 L V10	83	(France) Julien Ripert		1
(France) Team Speedcar	Audi R8 LMS GT4 Evo	Audi 5.2 L V10	300	(France) Philippe Thalamy		3
(France) Team Speedcar	Ginetta G55 Supercup	Ford 3.7 L V6	303	(France) Olivier Huez		5
(France) Team Speedcar	Ginetta G55 Supercup	Ford 3.7 L V6	555	(Belgium) François Denis		2–3, 5–6
(France) Driv'n Motorsport	Porsche Cayman GT4 Clubsport MR	Porsche 3.8 L Flat-6	57	(France) André Zaphiratos		4
(France) Herrero Racing	Audi R8 LMS GT4 Evo	Audi 5.2 L V10	64	(France) Pierre Arraou		All
UGT Light
(France) Team Speedcar	Mitjet BMW	Renault 3.5 L V6	7	(France) Marine Pidoux		1–2, 5
(France) Team Speedcar	Mitjet BMW	Renault 3.5 L V6	40	(France) Serge Nauges		1
(France) Driv'n Motorsport	Mitjet Super T	Renault 3.5 L V6	8	(France) Jules Doncieux		3
(France) Driv'n Motorsport	Ligier JS2 R	Ford 3.7 L V6	10	(France) Etienne Garrouste		1
(France) Driv'n Motorsport	Ligier JS2 R	Ford 3.7 L V6	62	(Italy) Lorenzo Cioni		6
(France) Driv'n Motorsport	Ligier JS2 R	Ford 3.7 L V6	62	(Italy) Raul Marchisio		6
(France) Driv'n Motorsport	Ligier JS2 R	Ford 3.7 L V6	72	(France) Maxime Courtemanche		5
(France) Driv'n Motorsport	Ligier JS2 R	Ford 3.7 L V6	72	(France) Hugo Lacasse		5
(France) Driv'n Motorsport	Ligier JS2 R	Ford 3.7 L V6	72	(France) Nathan Pozmentier		6
(France) Driv'n Motorsport	Porsche Cayman GT4 Clubsport MR	Porsche 3.8 L Flat-6	57	(France) André Zaphiratos		2, 6
(France) Pegasus Racing	Ligier JS2 R	Ford 3.7 L V6	29	(France) Christophe Weber		3
(France) ANS Motorsport	Ligier JS2 R	Ford 3.7 L V6	72	(France) Adrien Yvon		1
Guest
(France) Debard Automobiles by Racetivity	Mercedes-Benz AMG C63 DTM Mk. III	Mercedes-AMG 4.0 L V8	60	(France) Hugo Chevalier		6
(France) Debard Automobiles by Racetivity	Mercedes-Benz AMG C63 DTM Mk. III	Mercedes-AMG 4.0 L V8	60	(France) Eric Debard		6

=== Race results ===
Bold indicates overall winner.

Round		Circuit	Pole Position	UCS1 Winning Car	UCS2 Winning Car	UCS3 Winning Car	Porsche Cup Winning Car	UCS4 Winning Car	UCS Light Winning Car
Round		Circuit	Pole Position	UCS1 Winning Drivers	UCS2 Winning Drivers	UCS3 Winning Drivers	Porsche Cup Winning Drivers	UCS4 Winning Drivers	UCS Light Winning Drivers
1	R1	(France) Paul Ricard	(Italy) No. 3 SR&R SRL	**(Italy) No. 3 SR&R SRL**	(France) No. 30 CMR	(Italy) No. 353 SR&R SRL	(France) No. 14 2B Autosport	(Portugal) No. 9 RACAR Motorsport	(France) No. 10 Driv'n Motorsport
1	R1	(France) Paul Ricard	(Italy) Lorenzo Bontempelli	**(Italy) Lorenzo Bontempelli**	(France) Thierry Soave	(Republic of Ireland) Lyle Schofield	(France) Karl Vandewoestyne	(France) Mathieu Martins	(France) Etienne Garrouste
1	R2	(France) Paul Ricard	(Italy) No. 3 SR&R SRL	**(Italy) No. 3 SR&R SRL**	(France) No. 30 CMR	(Italy) No. 105 AF Corse	(France) No. 14 2B Autosport	(Portugal) No. 777 RACAR Motorsport	(France) No. 10 Driv'n Motorsport
1	R2	(France) Paul Ricard	(Italy) Francesco Atzori	**(Italy) Francesco Atzori**	(France) Quentin Antonel	(Japan) Motohito Isozaki	(France) Karl Vandewoestyne	(Brazil) Roberto Faria	(France) Etienne Garrouste
1	R3	(France) Paul Ricard	(Italy) No. 3 SR&R SRL	**(Italy) No. 3 SR&R SRL**	(France) No. 73 CMR	(Switzerland) No. 91 Racing Spirit of Léman	(France) No. 14 2B Autosport	(Portugal) No. 9 RACAR Motorsport	(France) No. 10 Driv'n Motorsport
1	R3	(France) Paul Ricard	(Italy) Lorenzo Bontempelli	**(Italy) Lorenzo Bontempelli**	(France) Patrick Michellier	(France) Frédéric Lacore	(France) Karl Vandewoestyne	(France) Mathieu Martins	(France) Etienne Garrouste
1	R4	(France) Paul Ricard	(France) No. 30 CMR	**(Italy) No. 3 SR&R SRL**	(France) No. 30 CMR	(Italy) No. 105 AF Corse	(France) No. 13 2B Autosport	(Portugal) No. 777 RACAR Motorsport	(France) No. 10 Driv'n Motorsport
1	R4	(France) Paul Ricard	(France) Quentin Antonel	**(Italy) Francesco Atzori**	(France) Quentin Antonel	(Japan) Motohito Isozaki	(France) César Vandewoestyne	(Brazil) Roberto Faria	(France) Etienne Garrouste
2	R1	(Portugal) Algarve	(France) No. 30 CMR	(France) No. 2 JRM Racing Team	**(Belgium) No. 77 BDR Competition Grupo Prom**	(Switzerland) No. 91 Racing Spirit of Léman	(France) No. 908 Seb Lajoux Racing	(France) No. 64 Herrero Racing	(France) No. 57 Driv'n Motorsport
2	R1	(Portugal) Algarve	(France) Alexis Berthet	(France) Olivier Morihain	**(Mexico) Alfredo Hernandez**	(France) Frédéric Lacore	(France) Stéphane Perrin	(France) Pierre Arraou	(France) André Zaphiratos
2	R2	(Portugal) Algarve	(Belgium) No. 77 BDR Competition Grupo Prom	**(Italy) No. 3 SR&R**	(Belgium) No. 77 BDR Competition Grupo Prom	(Switzerland) No. 91 Racing Spirit of Léman	(France) No. 908 Seb Lajoux Racing	(France) No. 555 Team Speedcar	(France) No. 57 Driv'n Motorsport
2	R2	(Portugal) Algarve	(Mexico) Alfredo Hernandez	**(Italy) Francesco Atzori**	(Mexico) Alfredo Hernandez	(France) Frédéric Lacore	(France) Sébastien Lajoux	(Belgium) François Denis	(France) André Zaphiratos
2	R3	(Portugal) Algarve	(Italy) No. 3 SR&R SRL	No starters	**(France) No. 30 CMR**	(Italy) No. 353 SR&R SRL	(France) No. 415 Seb Lajoux Racing	(France) No. 64 Herrero Racing	(France) No. 7 Team Speedcar
2	R3	(Portugal) Algarve	(Italy) "Aramis"	No starters	**(France) Alexis Berthet**	(Republic of Ireland) Lyle Schofield	(France) Jérémy Faligand	(France) Pierre Arraou	(France) Marine Pidoux
2	R4	(Portugal) Algarve	(Italy) No. 3 SR&R SRL	**(Italy) No. 3 SR&R SRL**	(France) No. 30 CMR	(Switzerland) No. 91 Racing Spirit of Léman	(France) No. 14 2B Autosport	(France) No. 555 Team Speedcar	(France) No. 57 Driv'n Motorsport
2	R4	(Portugal) Algarve	(Italy) Francesco Atzori	**(Italy) Francesco Atzori**	(France) Alexis Berthet	(France) Frédéric Lacore	(France) Karl Vandewoestyne	(Belgium) François Denis	(France) André Zaphiratos
3	R1	(Germany) Hockenheimring	(Belgium) No. 28 BDR Competition Grupo Prom	**(Belgium) No. 28 BDR Competition Grupo Prom**	(Belgium) No. 77 BDR Competition Grupo Prom	(Italy) No. 333 SR&R SRL	(France) No. 14 2B Autosport	(France) No. 300 Team Speedcar	(France) No. 8 Driv'n Motorsport
3	R1	(Germany) Hockenheimring	(Belgium) Amaury Bonduel	**(Belgium) Amaury Bonduel**	(Mexico) Alfredo Hernandez	(Portugal) Lourenço Monteiro	(France) César Vandewoestyne	(France) Philippe Thalamy	(France) Jules Doncieux
3	R2	(Germany) Hockenheimring	(Belgium) No. 28 BDR Competition Grupo Prom	(Belgium) No. 28 BDR Competition Grupo Prom	(France) No. 12 CMR	**(Italy) No. 353 SR&R SRL**	(France) No. 415 Spabiz Racing Team	(France) No. 300 Team Speedcar	(France) No. 8 Driv'n Motorsport
3	R2	(Germany) Hockenheimring	(Belgium) Amaury Bonduel	(Belgium) Amaury Bonduel	(France) Eric Mouez	**(Republic of Ireland) Lyle Schofield**	(France) Jérémy Faligand	(France) Philippe Thalamy	(France) Jules Doncieux
3	R3	(Germany) Hockenheimring	(Belgium) No. 28 BDR Competition Grupo Prom	(Belgium) No. 28 BDR Competition Grupo Prom	(France) No. 12 CMR	**(Switzerland) No. 91 Racing Spirit of Léman**	(France) No. 415 Spabiz Racing Team	(France) No. 300 Team Speedcar	(France) No. 8 Driv'n Motorsport
3	R3	(Germany) Hockenheimring	(Belgium) Amaury Bonduel	(Belgium) Amaury Bonduel	(France) Eric Mouez	**(France) Kévin Parsa**	(France) Jérémy Faligand	(France) Philippe Thalamy	(France) Jules Doncieux
3	R4	(Germany) Hockenheimring	(Belgium) No. 28 BDR Competition Grupo Prom	**(Belgium) No. 28 BDR Competition Grupo Prom**	(Belgium) No. 77 BDR Competition Grupo Prom	(Italy) No. 353 SR&R SRL	(France) No. 14 2B Autosport	(Switzerland) No. 39 Racing Spirit of Léman	(France) No. 8 Driv'n Motorsport
3	R4	(Germany) Hockenheimring	(Belgium) Amaury Bonduel	**(Belgium) Amaury Bonduel**	(Mexico) Alfredo Hernandez	(Republic of Ireland) Lyle Schofield	(France) Karl Vandewoestyne	(France) Baudouin Detout	(France) Jules Doncieux
4	R1	(Italy) Mugello	(Italy) No. 3 SR&R	**(Italy) No. 3 SR&R**	No finishers	(France) No. 73 CMR	(France) No. 81 Debard Automobiles by Racetivity	(France) No. 57 Driv'n Motorsport	No entries
4	R1	(Italy) Mugello	(Italy) Francesco Atzori	**(Italy) Francesco Atzori**	No finishers	(France) Patrick Michellier	(France) Eric Debard	(France) André Zaphiratos	No entries
4	R2	(Italy) Mugello	(France) No. 83 Debard Automobiles by Racetivity	**(France) No. 83 Debard Automobiles by Racetivity**	(Belgium) No. 77 BDR Competition Grupo Prom	(Italy) No. 353 SR&R SRL	(France) No. 81 Debard Automobiles by Racetivity	(France) No. 57 Driv'n Motorsport	No entries
4	R2	(Italy) Mugello	(France) Emmanuel Collard	**(France) Emmanuel Collard**	(Mexico) Alfredo Hernandez	(Portugal) Lourenço Monteiro	(France) Eric Debard	(France) André Zaphiratos	No entries
4	R3	(Italy) Mugello	(Italy) No. 3 SR&R	**(Italy) No. 3 SR&R**	(Belgium) No. 77 BDR Competition Grupo Prom	(Italy) No. 353 SR&R SRL	(France) No. 14 2B Autosport	(France) No. 57 Driv'n Motorsport	No entries
4	R3	(Italy) Mugello	(Italy) Francesco Atzori	**(Italy) Francesco Atzori**	(Mexico) Alfredo Hernandez	(Republic of Ireland) Lyle Schofield	(France) Karl Vandewoestyne	(France) André Zaphiratos	No entries
4	R4	(Italy) Mugello	(France) No. 83 Debard Automobiles by Racetivity	No starters	(Belgium) No. 77 BDR Competition Grupo Prom	(Italy) No. 353 SR&R SRL	(France) No. 89 GP Racing Team	(France) No. 57 Driv'n Motorsport	No entries
4	R4	(Italy) Mugello	(France) Emmanuel Collard	No starters	(Mexico) Alfredo Hernandez	(Portugal) Lourenço Monteiro	(France) Lionel Rigaud	(France) André Zaphiratos	No entries
5	R1	(France) Magny-Cours	(France) No. 60 Debard Automobiles by Racetivity	No finishers	No entries	(France) No. 12 CMR	**(France) No. 888 Seb Lajoux Racing**	(France) No. 555 Team Speedcar	(France) No. 72 Driv'n Motorsport
5	R1	(France) Magny-Cours	(France) Hugo Chevalier	No finishers	No entries	(France) Grégory Driot	**(France) Sébastien Lajoux**	(Belgium) François Denis	(France) Hugo Lacasse
5	R2	(France) Magny-Cours	(France) No. 12 CMR	(France) No. 60 Debard Automobiles by Racetivity	No entries	**(France) No. 12 CMR**	(France) No. 14 2B Autosport	(France) No. 64 Herrero Racing	(France) No. 72 Driv'n Motorsport
5	R2	(France) Magny-Cours	(United Kingdom) Lawrence Tomlinson	(France) Eric Debard	No entries	**(United Kingdom) Lawrence Tomlinson**	(France) César Vandewoestyne	(France) Pierre Arraou	(France) Maxime Courtemanche
5	R3	(France) Magny-Cours	(France) No. 60 Debard Automobiles by Racetivity	**(France) No. 60 Debard Automobiles by Racetivity**	No entries	(France) No. 12 CMR	(France) No. 888 Seb Lajoux Racing	(France) No. 555 Team Speedcar	(France) No. 72 Driv'n Motorsport
5	R3	(France) Magny-Cours	(France) Hugo Chevalier	**(France) Hugo Chevalier**	No entries	(France) Grégory Driot	(France) Sébastien Lajoux	(Belgium) François Denis	(France) Hugo Lacasse
5	R4	(France) Magny-Cours	(France) No. 12 CMR	(France) No. 60 Debard Automobiles by Racetivity	No entries	**(France) No. 12 CMR**	(France) No. 888 Seb Lajoux Racing	(France) No. 555 Team Speedcar	(France) No. 72 Driv'n Motorsport
5	R4	(France) Magny-Cours	(United Kingdom) Lawrence Tomlinson	(France) Eric Debard	No entries	**(United Kingdom) Lawrence Tomlinson**	(France) Stéphane Perrin	(Belgium) François Denis	(France) Maxime Courtemanche
6	R1	(France) Paul Ricard	(France) No. 60 Debard Automobiles by Racetivity	(Antigua and Barbuda) No. 4 HAAS RT	(France) No. 30 CMR	(Italy) No. 353 SR&R SRL	(France) No. 14 2B Autosport	(France) No. 32 Team Speedcar	(France) No. 72 Driv'n Motorsport
6	R1	(France) Paul Ricard	(France) Hugo Chevalier	(Belgium) Xavier Knauf	(France) Alexis Berthet	(Portugal) Lourenço Monteiro	(France) Karl Vandewoestyne	(France) Julien Goujat	(France) Nathan Pozmentier
6	R2	(France) Paul Ricard	(Italy) No. 3 SR&R SRL	**(Italy) No. 3 SR&R SRL**	(France) No. 30 CMR	(Italy) No. 353 SR&R SRL	(France) No. 14 2B Autosport	(France) No. 32 Team Speedcar	(France) No. 72 Driv'n Motorsport
6	R2	(France) Paul Ricard	(Italy) Francesco Atzori	**(Italy) Francesco Atzori**	(France) Alexis Berthet	(Republic of Ireland) Lyle Schofield	(France) César Vandewoestyne	(France) Julien Goujat	(France) Nathan Pozmentier
6	R3	(France) Paul Ricard	(France) No. 60 Debard Automobiles by Racetivity	(Antigua and Barbuda) No. 4 HAAS RT	(France) No. 30 CMR	(Switzerland) No. 91 Racing Spirit of Léman	(France) No. 14 2B Autosport	(France) No. 32 Team Speedcar	(France) No. 62 Driv'n Motorsport
6	R3	(France) Paul Ricard	(France) Hugo Chevalier	(Belgium) Xavier Knauf	(France) Alexis Berthet	(France) Frédéric Lacore	(France) Karl Vandewoestyne	(France) Julien Goujat	(Italy) Raul Marchisio
6	R4	(France) Paul Ricard	(Italy) No. 3 SR&R SRL	(Italy) No. 3 SR&R SRL	(France) No. 30 CMR	(Switzerland) No. 91 Racing Spirit of Léman	(France) No. 888 Seb Lajoux Racing	(France) No. 32 Team Speedcar	(France) No. 72 Driv'n Motorsport
6	R4	(France) Paul Ricard	(Italy) Francesco Atzori	(Italy) Francesco Atzori	(France) Alexis Berthet	(France) Frédéric Lacore	(France) Stéphane Perrin	(France) Julien Goujat	(France) Nathan Pozmentier

=== Championship standings ===
==== Scoring system ====
Position	**1st**	**2nd**	**3rd**	**4th**	**5th**	**6th**	**7th**	**8th**	**Other**
Points	16	12	10	8	6	4	2	1	0.5

==== Drivers' standings ====
Pos.	Drivers	Team	(France) LEC1				(Portugal) ALG				(Germany) HOC				(Italy) MUG				(France) MAG				(France) LEC2				Points
Overall
1	(Italy) Francesco Atzori	(Italy) SR&R SRL		**1**		1		1		**1**					**1**		**1**							**1**		**2**	128
2	(Republic of Ireland) Lyle Schofield	(Italy) SR&R SRL	4		4		11†		2			1		2	7		4		Ret		11			6		NC	73
3	(France) Karl Vandewoestyne	(France) 2B Autosport	3	6	2	16†	10		6			2		6	10		7						2		4		62.25
4	(France) Frédéric Lacore	(Switzerland) Racing Spirit of Léman	5	4	3	Ret	5	4	13†	3		3		5	8	4	5	2	WD				Ret	8	7	4	60.75
5	(Portugal) Lourenço Monteiro	(Italy) SR&R SRL		7		Ret		6		Ret	5		3			3		1		5		DNS	7		9		58.5
6	(France) Sébastien Lajoux	(France) Seb Lajoux Racing						5		7									1		2		3		8		49
7	(Mexico) Alfredo Hernandez	(Belgium) BDR Competition Grupo Prom					1	**1**	Ret	12	2	8†	15†	3	Ret	7	10	3									45.5
8	(France) César Vandewoestyne	(France) 2B Autosport	9	9	5	5		8		11	7		6			8		6	3	3	3	5		4		Ret	45
9	(France) Alexis Berthet	(France) CMR		WD		WD	**2**	3	1	2													4	7	5	4	41
10	(France) Eric Debard	(France) Debard Automobiles by Racetivity					Ret	12	8	6					2	6	8	**DNS**		2		2		2		1	35.25
11	(France) Olivier Morihain	(France) JRM Racing Team	10	5	7	DNS	3	11	DNS	DNS	3	Ret	DNS	DNS	6	6	3	DNS					10	4	6	7	33.75
12	(France) Patrick Michellier	(France) CMR	8		6						8	9	7	DNS	4	9	11	4	5	6	7	6	15	13	11	10	33.25
13	(Italy) Lorenzo Bontempelli	(Italy) SR&R SRL	**1**		**1**																						32
14	(United Kingdom) Lawrence Tomlinson	(France) CMR																		**1**		**1**					32
15	(France) Stéphane Perrin	(France) Seb Lajoux Racing					4		7											4		3		8		6	31
16	(Belgium) Xavier Knauf	(Antigua and Barbuda) HAAS RT																					5	3	2	3	24
17	(France) Quentin Antonel	(France) CMR		2		**2**																					24
18	(Belgium) Amaury Bonduel	(Belgium) BDR Competition Grupo Prom									**1**	**7**	**2**	**1**													23
19	(France) Jérémy Faligand	(France) Spabiz Racing Team	13	11	10	6					DNS	6	4	7													19.75
19	(France) Jérémy Faligand	(France) Seb Lajoux Racing					7	7	4	4																	19.75
20	(Italy) Francesco Coassin	(Italy) SR&R SRL	7		8		DNS	DNS	DNS	DNS	6		5		9		6										17.5
21	(France) Lionel Rigaud	(France) GP Racing Team					9	9	5	5					3	10	9	5					8	10	12	9	17
22	(France) Kévin Parsa	(Switzerland) Racing Spirit of Léman									Ret		1														16
23	(France) Hugo Chevalier	(France) Debard Automobiles by Racetivity																	**Ret**		**1**		**1**		**1**		16
24	(France) Emmanuel Collard	(France) Debard Automobiles by Racetivity														**1**		**DNS**									16
25	(France) Gabriel Pemeant	(France) GP Racing Team																	4		4						16
26	(Australia) Harrison Walker	(Italy) SR&R SRL										4		DNS		5		DNS									14
UCS1
1	(Italy) Francesco Atzori	(Italy) SR&R SRL		**1**		1		1		**1**					**1**		**1**							**1**		**2**	128
2	(France) Olivier Morihain	(France) JRM Racing Team	10	5	7	**DNS**	**3**	**11**	DNS	DNS	3	Ret	DNS	DNS	6	6	3	DNS					10	4	6	7	85
3	(Belgium) Xavier Knauf	(Antigua and Barbuda) HAAS RT																					**5**	3	2	3	40
4	(Belgium) Amaury Bonduel	(Belgium) BDR Competition Grupo Prom									**1**	**7**	**2**	**1**													32
5	(Italy) Lorenzo Bontempelli	(Italy) SR&R SRL	**1**		**1**																						32
6	(France) Eric Debard	(France) Debard Automobiles by Racetivity																		**2**		**2**					32
7	(France) Charles-Henri Samani	(France) Debard Automobiles by Racetivity													11		2										22
8	(France) Hugo Chevalier	(France) Debard Automobiles by Racetivity																	**Ret**		**1**						16
9	(France) Emmanuel Collard	(France) Debard Automobiles by Racetivity														**1**		**DNS**									16
10	(France) Franck Dezoteux	(France) AB Sport Auto																					6	Ret	3	Ret	12
	(Italy) "Aramis"	(Italy) SR&R SRL					DNS		**DNS**							WD		WD					WD		WD		0
	(France) Evan Meunier (France) Didier Pierrard	(France) Krafft Racing by Turbo 2000																	WD								0
UCS2
1	(Mexico) Alfredo Hernandez	(Belgium) BDR Competition Grupo Prom					1	**1**	**Ret**	**12**	**2**	8†	15†	3	**Ret**	**7**	**10**	**3**									73
2	(France) Eric Mouez	(France) CMR	WD		WD			10		8	4	**5**	**9**	4									11	22†	10	8	72
3	(France) Alexis Berthet	(France) CMR		WD		WD	**2**	3	1	2													**4**	**7**	**5**	**4**	52
4	(France) George Cabanne	(France) CMR		8		4																	9	11	13	11	46
5	(France) Quentin Antonel	(France) CMR		**2**		**2**																					32
6	(France) Patrick Michellier	(France) CMR	8		6																						22
7	(France) Gregory Driot	(France) CMR					8		4																		22
8	(France) Thierry Soave	(France) CMR	**2**		**Ret**																						16
UCS3
1	(Republic of Ireland) Lyle Schofield	(Italy) SR&R SRL	4		4		11†		2			**1**		**2**	**7**		**4**		**Ret**		**11**			**6**		**NC**	140
2	(France) Frédéric Lacore	(Switzerland) Racing Spirit of Léman	5	**4**	**3**	**Ret**	5	**4**	**13**†	3		3		5	8	4	5	2	WD				Ret	8	7	5	119
3	(Portugal) Lourenço Monteiro	(Italy) SR&R SRL		7		Ret		6		Ret	5		3			**3**		**1**		5		DNS	**7**		**9**		116
4	(France) Patrick Michellier	(France) CMR									8	9	7	DNS	4	9	11	4	5	6	7	6	15	13	11	10	76
5	(Italy) Francesco Coassin	(Italy) SR&R SRL	7		8		DNS	DNS	DNS	DNS	6		5		9		6										58
6	(United Kingdom) Lawrence Tomlinson	(France) CMR																		**1**		**1**					32
7	(France) Grégory Driot	(France) CMR																	**2**		**5**						32
8	(Japan) Motohito Isozaki	(Italy) AF Corse	6	3	9	3																					25
9	(France) Solenn Amrouche	(France) Vortex	11	10	12†	DNS	6	DNS	Ret	DNS	12	13	Ret	DNS													23
10	(Australia) Harrison Walker	(Italy) SR&R SRL										4		DNS		5		DNS									20
11	(France) Kévin Parsa	(Switzerland) Racing Spirit of Léman									**Ret**		**1**														16
12	(France) Franck Kewitz	(France) JVO Racing	20	15	13	8																					12
13	(Italy) Lorenzo Cossu	(Italy) SR&R SRL		12		DNS																					6
PC
1	(France) César Vandewoestyne	(France) 2B Autosport	9	9	5	5		**8**		11	**7**		**6**			8		6	3	3	3	5		**5**		Ret	123
2	(France) Karl Vandewoestyne	(France) 2B Autosport	**3**	**6**	**2**	**16**†	**10**		6			**2**		**6**	**10**		**7**						**2**		**2**		119
3	(France) Sébastien Lajoux	(France) Seb Lajoux Racing						5		**7**									**1**		**2**		3		8		80
5	(France) Stéphane Perrin	(France) Seb Lajoux Racing					4		**7**											4		3		9		**6**	80
4	(France) Jérémy Faligand	(France) Spabiz Racing Team	13	11	10	6					DNS	6	4	7													69
4	(France) Jérémy Faligand	(France) Seb Lajoux Racing					7	7	4	4																	69
6	(France) Lionel Rigaud	(France) GP Racing Team					9	9	5	5					3	10	9	5					8	10	12	9	66
7	(France) Eric Debard	(France) Debard Automobiles by Racetivity					Ret	12	8	6					2	**6**	8	**DNS**									33
8	(France) Carla Debard	(France) Debard Automobiles by Racetivity																	6	7	6	6	17	12	18	13	32
9	(France) Loïc Teire	(France) GP Racing Team																		14†		4					20
10	(France) Gabriel Pemeant	(France) GP Racing Team																	4		4						20
11	(France) Julien Bourguignon	(France) 2B Autosport														11†		7									18
12	(France) Paul Benezech	(France) Debard Automobiles by Racetivity																					12	19	16	18	15
13	(France) Hughes Vandewoestyne	(France) 2B Autosport													5		DNS										10
14	(France) Dominique Guillemaut	(France) Krafft Racing																					DSQ	23	22	20	7
15	(France) Jean-Pierre Ancelin	(France) 2B Autosport									11	DNS	DNS	DNS													6
	(France) Jeremy Avellaneda	(France) Krafft Racing													Ret	Ret	Ret	DNS									0
	(France) Cédric Toison	(France) Nad Systems by HRT																					DNS	DNS	DNS	DNS	0
UCS4
1	(France) Pierre Arraou	(France) Herrero Racing	15	17	14	13	**12**	**14**	**9**	**10**	13	15	12	12	13†	DNS	DNS	DNS	9	9	12	9	20	20	19	16	119
2	(Belgium) François Denis	(France) Team Speedcar					13	13	10	9	14	16	10	11					**8**	**12**	**9**	**8**	16	18	17	17	97
3	(Switzerland) Adrien Stern	(France) CMR	21	18	19	11													11	13	10	10	18	17	15	DNS	57
4	(France) André Zaphiratos	(France) Driv'n Motorsport													**12**	**12**	**12**	**8**									32
5	(France) Julien Goujat	(France) Team Speedcar	WD																				**14**	**14**	**14**	**12**	32
6	(France) Mathieu Martins	(Portugal) RACAR Motorsport	**12**		**11**																						32
7	(Brazil) Roberto Faria	(Portugal) RACAR Motorsport		**13**		**7**																					32
8	(France) Philippe Thalamy	(France) Team Speedcar									10	11	8	10													30
9	(France) Baudouin Detout	(Switzerland) Racing Spirit of Léman									16	12	11	**8**													23
10	(France) Olivier Huez	(France) Team Speedcar																	12	10	14	12					23
11	(Portugal) António Marques Lopes	(Portugal) RACAR Motorsport		20		15																					16
12	(Portugal) Ruben Duarte Vaquinha	(Portugal) RACAR Motorsport	16		Ret																						10
	(France) Franck Dupuis	(Switzerland) Racing Spirit of Léman																					DNS		DNS		0
	(France) Henri Lombard	(Switzerland) Racing Spirit of Léman																						DNS		DNS	0
	(France) Julien Ripert	(France) Team Speedcar	WD																								0
UGT Light
1	(France) Marine Pidoux	(France) Team Speedcar	18	19	18	14	15	16	**11**	**14**†									10	11	13	Ret					62
2	(France) André Zaphiratos	(France) Driv'n Motorsport					**14**	**15**	12	13													21	21	21	19	51
3	(France) Hugo Lacasse	(France) Driv'n Motorsport																	**7**		**8**						32
4	(France) Maxime Courtemanche	(France) Driv'n Motorsport																		**8**		**11**					32
5	(France) Etienne Garrouste	(France) Driv'n Motorsport	**14**	**14**	**15**	**9**																					32
6	(France) Jules Doncieux	(France) Driv'n Motorsport									9	10	**15**	**9**													32
7	(Italy) Raul Marchisio	(France) Driv'n Motorsport																					19		20		28
8	(France) Nathan Pozmentier	(France) Driv'n Motorsport																					**13**	**15**	**DSQ**	**14**	24
9	(France) Adrien Yvon	(France) ANS Motorsport	17	16	16	10																					24
10	(France) Christophe Weber	(France) Pegasus Racing									15	14	14	13													24
11	(Italy) Lorenzo Cioni	(France) Driv'n Motorsport																						16		15	24
12	(France) Serge Nauges	(France) Team Speedcar	19	21	17	12																					18
Guest drivers ineligible for points
	(France) Hugo Chevalier	(France) Debard Automobiles by Racetivity																					**1**		**1**		
	(France) Eric Debard	(France) Debard Automobiles by Racetivity																						2		1	
Pos.	Drivers	Team	(France) LEC1				(Portugal) ALG				(Germany) HOC				(Italy) MUG				(France) MAG				(France) LEC2				Points

Key
Colour	Result
Gold	Winner
Silver	Second place
Bronze	Third place
Green	Other points position
Blue	Other classified position
Blue	Not classified, finished (NC)
Purple	Not classified, retired (Ret)
Red	Did not qualify (DNQ)
Red	Did not pre-qualify (DNPQ)
Black	Disqualified (DSQ)
White	Did not start (DNS)
White	Race cancelled (C)
Blank	Did not practice (DNP)
Blank	Excluded (EX)
Blank	Did not arrive (DNA)
Blank	Withdrawn (WD)
Blank	Did not enter (cell empty)
Text formatting	Meaning
**Bold**	Pole position
Italics	Fastest lap

† – Drivers did not finish the race, but were classified as they completed over 75% of the class winner's race distance.

==== Teams' standings ====
Pos.	Team	(France) LEC1				(Portugal) ALG				(Germany) HOC				(Italy) MUG				(France) MAG				(France) LEC2				Points
1	(France) Team Speedcar	18	19	17	12	13	13	**11**	9	10	11	8	10					**8**	10	**9**	**8**	**14**	**14**	**14**	**12**	246
2	(Italy) SR&R SRL	4	7	4	1	11†	1	2	**1**	5	**1**	3	**2**	**7**	**3**	**4**	**1**	**Ret**	5	**11**	DNS	**6**	**1**	**9**	**1**	244
3	(France) 2B Autosport	**3**	**6**	**2**	5	**10**	**8**	6	11	**7**	**2**	**6**	**6**	5	8	**7**	6	3	3	3	5	**2**	**5**	**2**	Ret	232
4	(France) Driv'n Motorsport	**14**	**14**	**15**	**9**	**14**	**15**	12	13	9	10	**15**	**9**	**12**	**12**	**12**	**8**	**7**	**8**	**8**	**11**	**13**	**15**	**20**	**14**	222
5	(France) CMR	**2**	18	19	11	**2**	3	1	2	8	**5**	**9**	4	4	9	11	4	11	**1**	10	10	18	17	15	**4**	219
6	(France) Herrero Racing	15	17	14	13	**12**	**14**	**9**	**10**	13	15	12	12	13†	DNS	DNS	DNS	9	9	12	9	20	20	19	16	188
7	(Switzerland) Racing Spirit of Léman	5	**4**	**3**	**Ret**	5	**4**	**13**†	3	16	3	**1**	**8**	8	4	5	2	WD				Ret	8	7	5	184
8	(France) Seb Lajoux Racing					4	5	4	4									**1**	4	**2**	3	3	9	8	**6**	176
9	(France) GP Racing Team					9	9	5	5					3	10	9	5	4	14†	4	4	8	10	12	9	164
10	(France) Debard Automobiles by Racetivity					Ret	12	8	6					2	**6**	8	**DNS**	6	7	**1**	**2**	12	12	18	13	132
11	(France) JRM Racing Team	10	5	7	**DNS**	**3**	**11**	DNS	DNS	3	Ret	DNS	DNS	6	6	3	DNS					10	4	6	7	85
12	(Portugal) RACAR Motorsport	**12**	**13**	**11**	**7**																					64
13	(Italy) AF Corse	6	3	9	3																					50
14	(France) ANS Motorsport	17	16	16	10																					48
15	(France) Spabiz Racing Team	13	11	10	6					DNS	6	4	7													41
16	(Antigua and Barbuda) HAAS RT																					**5**	3	2	3	40
17	(France) Vortex	11	10	12†	DNS	6	DNS	Ret	DNS	12	13	Ret	DNS													40
18	(France) Pegasus Racing									15	14	14	13													24
19	(France) JVO Racing	20	15	13	8																					24
20	(France) AB Sport Auto																					6	Ret	3	Ret	12
21	(France) Krafft Racing													Ret	Ret	Ret	DNS					DSQ	23	22	20	12
	(France) Nad Systems by HRT																					DNS	DNS	DNS	DNS	0
	(France) Krafft Racing by Turbo 2000																	WD								0
Pos.	Team	(France) LEC1				(Portugal) ALG				(Germany) HOC				(Italy) MUG				(France) MAG				(France) LEC2				Points

== Ultimate Formula Cup ==
The Ultimate Formula Cup was open to Tatuus FR-19 cars in the F3R class, Tatuus FR2.0/13s in the FR2.0 class and Mygale M14-F4 and Tatuus F4 cars in the F4 class. An extra class was introduced to separate between entries in the F3R class using 13-inch or 17-inch tyres.

=== Teams and drivers ===
Team	No.	Drivers	Rounds
F3R - 17 inch
(France) Formula Motorsport	2	(Switzerland) Walter Rykart	1
(France) Formula Motorsport	183	(Switzerland) Aubin Robert-Prince	1
(France) Krafft Racing	14	(France) Milan Petelet	1
(France) Krafft Racing	16	(France) Maxime Trouche	2
(France) Krafft Racing	17	(France) Yann Lavocat	2
(France) Krafft Racing	17	(France) Didier Pierrard	5–6
(France) Rever'Team	23	(France) Gilles Depierre	1 (Note: Although the official results state Depierre entered race 1 of round 2 in the 17in class (and won it), his result was counted towards the 13in class, which would explain the officially published point tally of Boillot and Lavocat, as well as the series crediting Lavocat for the win in the 17in class. A mistake in the official results shall not be discarded.)
(France) JRM Racing - Kennol	49	(France) Philippe Daric	1
(France) Formula Motorsport	66	(Luxembourg) Enzo Richer	1
(France) Winfield Racing	162	(Australia) Craig McLatchey	1
F3R - 13 inch
(France) Formula Motorsport	2	(Switzerland) Walter Rykart	2–6
(France) Formula Motorsport	23	(France) Dylan Estre	5–6
(France) Formula Motorsport	66	(Luxembourg) Enzo Richer	2–6
(France) Formula Motorsport	83	(Switzerland) Aubin Robert-Prince	3–6
(France) Formula Motorsport	86	(Switzerland) Laurent Wutrich	4–6
(France) Race Motorsport	4	(France) Frédéric Boillot	All
(Kazakhstan) ART-Line Virage	6	(Argentina) Juan Francisco Soldavini	2–6
(Kazakhstan) ART-Line Virage	12	(Kazakhstan) Alexander Abkhazava	4
(France) Graff Racing	9	(Switzerland) David Cristini	4
(France) Graff Racing	9	(Portugal) Alexandre Lima	5–6
(France) Thunder by Winfield Racing	10	(Australia) Craig McLatchey	2, 6
(France) Thunder by Winfield Racing	28	(France) Adrien Closmenil	2
(France) Minerva Oil by Krafft Racing	14	(France) Milan Petelet	2
(France) Krafft Racing	16	(France) Maxime Trouche	6
(France) Krafft Racing	99	(France) Evan Meunier	2, 5–6
(France) Winfield Racing	21	(United Arab Emirates) Alain Bucher	2
(France) Winfield Racing	28	(France) Nico Tine	6
(France) Winfield Racing	30	(France) Adrien Closmenil	6
(France) Rever'Team	23	(France) Gilles Dépierre	2–4
(France) Lamo Racing	24	(France) Arthur Aegerter	4–6
(France) JRM Racing - Kennol	49	(France) Philippe Daric	2–6
(France) JRM Racing - Kennol	75	(France) Frédéric Morihain	2
(Italy) TS Corse	85	(Argentina) Nazareno López Cesaratto	6
(France) Sports-Promotion	222	(France) Marius Mezard	1–2
FR2.0
(France) Lamo Racing	14	(France) Serge Coperchini	1, 5–6
(France) Lamo Racing	15	(France) Thierry Aimard	4, 6
(France) Lamo Racing	24	(France) Youssuf Ziani	1
(France) Lamo Racing	33	(France) Thierry Malhomme	All
(France) Lamo Racing	68	(United Arab Emirates) Alain Bucher	1, 3–6
(France) Sports-Promotion	12	(Switzerland) Achille Louvet	1
(France) Sports-Promotion	62	(Switzerland) Christophe Hurni	1–2
(France) Krafft Racing	14	(France) Milan Petelet	3
(France) Krafft Racing	16	(France) Maxime Trouche	6
(France) Krafft Racing	19	(France) Arthur Aegerter	1, 3
(France) Krafft Racing	19	(France) Tanguy Trouche	2, 6
(France) Krafft Racing	21	(Switzerland) Eric Vuagnat	6
(Italy) TS Corse	29	(Argentina) Nazareno López Cesaratto	4–5
(France) Ziffel	31	(France) Saréne Ziffel	5
(Austria) Franz Wöss Racing	125	(United States) Robert Siska	5
F4
(Italy) TS Corse	15	(Colombia) Gerónimo Gómez Azza	4

=== Race results ===
Bold indicates overall winner.

Round		Circuit	Pole position	Fastest lap	F3R class		FR2.0 class	F4 class
Round		Circuit	Pole position	Fastest lap	13' Winning driver	17' Winning driver	Winning driver	
1	R1	(France) Circuit Paul Ricard	(France) Marius Mezard	(France) Marius Mezard	(France) **Marius Mezard**	(Luxembourg) Enzo Richer	(Switzerland) Christophe Hurni	no entries
1	R2	(France) Circuit Paul Ricard	(France) Marius Mezard	(France) Marius Mezard	(France) **Marius Mezard**	(France) Milane Petelet	(Switzerland) Christophe Hurni	no entries
1	R3	(France) Circuit Paul Ricard	(France) Marius Mezard	(France) Marius Mezard	(France) **Marius Mezard**	(Luxembourg) Enzo Richer	(Switzerland) Christophe Hurni	no entries
2	R1	(Portugal) Algarve International Circuit	(France) Adrien Closmenil	(France) Adrien Closmenil	**(France) Adrien Closmenil**	(France) Gilles Depierre	(Switzerland) Christophe Hurni	no entries
2	R2	(Portugal) Algarve International Circuit	(France) Adrien Closmenil	(France) Adrien Closmenil	(Luxembourg) **Enzo Richer**	(France) Yann Lavocat	(France) Thierry Malhomme	no entries
2	R3	(Portugal) Algarve International Circuit	(Luxembourg) Enzo Richer	(France) Adrien Closmenil	**(Argentina) Juan Francisco Soldavini**	(France) Yann Lavocat	(Switzerland) Christophe Hurni	no entries
3	R1	(Germany) Hockenheimring	(Argentina) Juan Francisco Soldavini	(Argentina) Juan Francisco Soldavini	**(Argentina) Juan Francisco Soldavini**	no entries	(France) Arthur Aegerter	no entries
3	R2	(Germany) Hockenheimring	(Argentina) Juan Francisco Soldavini	(Luxembourg) Enzo Richer	**(Argentina) Juan Francisco Soldavini**	no entries	(United Arab Emirates) Alain Bucher	no entries
3	R3	(Germany) Hockenheimring	(Argentina) Juan Francisco Soldavini	(Luxembourg) Enzo Richer	(Luxembourg) **Enzo Richer**	no entries	(United Arab Emirates) Alain Bucher	no entries
4	R1	(Italy) Mugello Circuit	(Argentina) Juan Francisco Soldavini	(Argentina) Juan Francisco Soldavini	**(Argentina) Juan Francisco Soldavini**	no entries	(Argentina) Nazareno López Cesaratto	(Colombia) Gerónimo Gómez Azza
4	R2	(Italy) Mugello Circuit	(Argentina) Juan Francisco Soldavini	(Argentina) Juan Francisco Soldavini	**(Argentina) Juan Francisco Soldavini**	no entries	(Argentina) Nazareno López Cesaratto	(Colombia) Gerónimo Gómez Azza
4	R3	(Italy) Mugello Circuit	(Argentina) Juan Francisco Soldavini	(Argentina) Juan Francisco Soldavini	**(Argentina) Juan Francisco Soldavini**	no entries	(Argentina) Nazareno López Cesaratto	(Colombia) Gerónimo Gómez Azza
5	R1	(France) Circuit de Nevers Magny-Cours	(Argentina) Juan Francisco Soldavini	(Luxembourg) Enzo Richer	(Luxembourg) **Enzo Richer**	(France) Didier Pierrard	(Argentina) Nazareno López Cesaratto	no entries
5	R2	(France) Circuit de Nevers Magny-Cours	(Luxembourg) Enzo Richer	(Luxembourg) Enzo Richer	(Luxembourg) **Enzo Richer**	(France) Didier Pierrard	(Argentina) Nazareno López Cesaratto	no entries
5	R3	(France) Circuit de Nevers Magny-Cours	(Luxembourg) Enzo Richer	(Argentina) Nazareno López Cesaratto	(France) Dylan Estre	(France) Didier Pierrard	**(Argentina) Nazareno López Cesaratto**	no entries
6	R1	(France) Circuit Paul Ricard	(France) Adrien Closmenil	(France) Adrien Closmenil	**(France) Adrien Closmenil**	(France) Didier Pierrard	(Switzerland) Eric Vuagnat	no entries
6	R2	(France) Circuit Paul Ricard	(France) Adrien Closmenil	(France) Adrien Closmenil	**(France) Dylan Estre**	(France) Didier Pierrard	(United Arab Emirates) Alain Bucher	no entries
6	R3	(France) Circuit Paul Ricard	(Luxembourg) Enzo Richer	(France) Dylan Estre	**(France) Adrien Closmenil**	(France) Didier Pierrard	(United Arab Emirates) Alain Bucher	no entries

=== Standings ===
==== Scoring system ====
Points are awarded to the top 20 finishers in each class as follows:

Position	**1st**	**2nd**	**3rd**	**4th**	**5th**	**6th**	**7th**	**8th**	**9th**	**10th**	**11th**	**12th**	**13th**	**14th**	**15th**	**16th**	**17th**	**18th**	**19th**	**20th**
Points	28	24	20	17	16	15	14	13	12	11	10	9	8	7	6	5	4	3	2	1

According to the sporting regulations, the following additional rules are to be enforced:

- To score 100% of the allocated points towards the class standings, a driver must have completed at least 75% of the distance of the driver classified 1st in said class (rounding down the number of laps), as well as at least 50% of the distance of the driver classified 1st in the race.
- To score 50% of the allocated points towards the class standings, a driver must have completed at least 50% of the distance of the driver classified 1st in said class (rounding down the number of laps), as well as at least 50% of the distance of the driver classified 1st in the race.
- A driver not completing at least 50% of the distance of the driver classified 1st in a class will not score any points towards the class standings.
- Should the driver classified 1st in a class not complete at least 50% of the distance of the driver classified 1st in the race, no driver in said class will score points towards the class standings.
- Should a driver be the only competitor in a class, said driver must have completed at least 50% of the distance of the driver classified 1st in the race to score any points towards said class.
- Drivers not taking part in at least two of the first four rounds in the same class will not score any points in the last round.

==== F3R 13in class standings ====
Pos	Driver	LEC1 (France)			POR (Portugal)			HOC (Germany)			MUG (Italy)			MAG (France)			LEC2 (France)			Pts
Pos	Driver	R1	R2	R3	R1	R2	R3	R1	R2	R3	R1	R2	R3	R1	R2	R3	R1	R2	R3	Pts
1	(Luxembourg) Enzo Richer				2	1	**3**	2	2	1	8*	2	3	1	**1**	**2**	2	2	**3**	362.5
2	(France) Frédéric Boillot	2	2	DNS	10	7	9	4	5	3	3	6	6	6	5	6	8	9	7	291
3	(Argentina) Juan Francisco Soldavini				5	10	1	**1**	**1**	**Ret**	**1**	**1**	**1**	**Ret**	6	3	WD	WD	WD	230
4	(Switzerland) Aubin Robert-Prince							3	3	2	Ret	DNS	5	3	4	4	7	6	6	206
5	(Switzerland) Walter Rykart				7	6	7	6	4	4	6	7	Ret	5	9*	Ret	9	8	10	197
6	(France) Marius Mezard	**1**	**1**	**1**	4	2	6													140
7	(France) Philippe Daric				12	11	11	7	7	DNS	7	8	8	WD	WD	WD	13	12	DNS	129
8	(France) Evan Meunier				6	4	5							8	3	5	5	4	5	97
9	(France) Arthur Aegerter										5	4	4	4	7	7	11	5	4	95
10	(France) Dylan Estre													2	2	1	4	1	2	76
11	(France) Gilles Depierre				9	5	Ret	5	6	5	WD	WD	WD							75
12	(Kazakhstan) Alexander Abkhazava										2	3	2							68
13	(France) Adrien Closmenil				**1**	**9**	2										**1**	**13**	1	64
14	(France) Milan Petelet				3	3	4													57
15	(Switzerland) Laurent Wutrich										4	5	7	WD	WD	WD	6	7	9	47
16	(United Arab Emirates) Alain Bucher				8	8	8													39
17	(Portugal) Alexandre Lima													7	8	DNS	10	11	DNS	27
18	(Australia) Craig McLatchey				11	Ret	10										Ret	14	8	21
—	(Argentina) Nazareno López Cesaratto																3	3	Ret	0
—	(France) Maxime Trouche																12	10	DNS	0
—	(Switzerland) David Cristini										Ret	DNS	DNS							0
—	(France) Frédéric Morihain				WD	WD	WD													0
—	(France) Nico Tine																WD	WD	WD	0
Pos	Driver	R1	R2	R3	R1	R2	R3	R1	R2	R3	R1	R2	R3	R1	R2	R3	R1	R2	R3	Pts
Pos	Driver	LEC1 (France)			POR (Portugal)			HOC (Germany)			MUG (Italy)			MAG (France)			LEC2 (France)			Pts

Key
Colour	Result
Gold	Winner
Silver	Second place
Bronze	Third place
Green	Other points position
Blue	Other classified position
Blue	Not classified, finished (NC)
Purple	Not classified, retired (Ret)
Red	Did not qualify (DNQ)
Red	Did not pre-qualify (DNPQ)
Black	Disqualified (DSQ)
White	Did not start (DNS)
White	Race cancelled (C)
Blank	Did not practice (DNP)
Blank	Excluded (EX)
Blank	Did not arrive (DNA)
Blank	Withdrawn (WD)
Blank	Did not enter (cell empty)
Text formatting	Meaning
**Bold**	Pole position
Italics	Fastest lap

* - half points

==== F3R 17in class standings ====
Pos	Driver	LEC1 (France)			POR (Portugal)			HOC (Germany)			MUG (Italy)			MAG (France)			LEC2 (France)			Pts
Pos	Driver	R1	R2	R3	R1	R2	R3	R1	R2	R3	R1	R2	R3	R1	R2	R3	R1	R2	R3	Pts
1	(France) Didier Pierrard													1	1	1	1	1	1	84
2	(France) Yann Lavocat				1	1	1													84
3	(Luxembourg) Enzo Richer	1	2	1																80
4	(France) Milan Petelet	2	1	3																72
5	(Switzerland) Aubin Robert-Prince	3	3	2																64
6	(France) Maxime Trouche				2*	2	2													60
7	(France) Gilles Depierre	5	6	4																48
8	(Switzerland) Walter Rykart	4	7	5																47
9	(Australia) Craig McLatchey	7	4	6																46
10	(France) Philippe Daric	6	5	7																45
Pos	Driver	R1	R2	R3	R1	R2	R3	R1	R2	R3	R1	R2	R3	R1	R2	R3	R1	R2	R3	Pts
Pos	Driver	LEC1 (France)			POR (Portugal)			HOC (Germany)			MUG (Italy)			MAG (France)			LEC2 (France)			Pts

==== FR2.0 standings ====
Pos	Driver	LEC1 (France)			POR (Portugal)			HOC (Germany)			MUG (Italy)			MAG (France)			LEC2 (France)			Pts
Pos	Driver	R1	R2	R3	R1	R2	R3	R1	R2	R3	R1	R2	R3	R1	R2	R3	R1	R2	R3	Pts
1	(United Arab Emirates) Alain Bucher	3	3	3				2	1	1	2	2	2	Ret	2	2	2	1	1	344
2	(France) Thierry Malhomme	5	5	5	2	1	2	Ret	DNS	2	3	3	4	2	5	DNS	4	3	2	317
3	(Argentina) Nazareno López Cesaratto										1	1	1	1	1	1				168
4	(Switzerland) Christophe Hurni	1	1	1	1	3	1													160
5	(France) Arthur Aegerter	4	4	4				1	2	DNS										103
6	(Switzerland) Achille Louvet	2	2	2																72
7	(France) Tanguy Trouche				3	2	3										6	4	DNS	64
8	(United States) Robert Siska													3	3	3				60
9	(France) Thierry Aimard										4	4	3				5	5	3	54
10	(France) Saréne Ziffel													DSQ	4	DNS				17
—	(Switzerland) Eric Vuagnat																1	2	Ret	0
—	(France) Serge Coperchini	WD	WD	WD										WD	WD	WD	3	Ret	4	0
—	(France) Youssuf Ziani	DNS	DNS	DNS																0
—	(France) Milan Petelet							WD	WD	WD										0
Pos	Driver	R1	R2	R3	R1	R2	R3	R1	R2	R3	R1	R2	R3	R1	R2	R3	R1	R2	R3	Pts
Pos	Driver	LEC1 (France)			POR (Portugal)			HOC (Germany)			MUG (Italy)			MAG (France)			LEC2 (France)			Pts

==== F4 standings ====
Pos	Driver	LEC1 (France)			POR (Portugal)			HOC (Germany)			MUG (Italy)			MAG (France)			LEC2 (France)			Pts
Pos	Driver	R1	R2	R3	R1	R2	R3	R1	R2	R3	R1	R2	R3	R1	R2	R3	R1	R2	R3	Pts
1	(Colombia) Gerónimo Gómez Azza										1	1*	1							70
Pos	Driver	R1	R2	R3	R1	R2	R3	R1	R2	R3	R1	R2	R3	R1	R2	R3	R1	R2	R3	Pts
Pos	Driver	LEC1 (France)			POR (Portugal)			HOC (Germany)			MUG (Italy)			MAG (France)			LEC2 (France)			Pts
