= Marlon Hernandez =

French racing driver (born 2004)

- Hernandez in 2024
- Nationality: (France) French
- Born: 12 July 2004 (age 22) Ecully, France

European Le Mans Series career
- Debut season: 2026
- Current team: DKR Engineering
- Categorisation: FIA Silver
- Car number: 3
- Starts: 6 (6 entries)
- Wins: 0
- Podiums: 0
- Poles: 0
- Fastest laps: 0
- Best finish: 12th (LMP2 Pro-Am) in 2026

Marlon Hernandez (born 12 July 2004) is a French racing driver currently competing in the LMP2 Pro-Am class of the European Le Mans Series with DKR Engineering. He is also a race winner in the European Endurance Prototype Cup.

== Career ==
=== Early career ===
Hernandez started his racing career in karting, competing in the European Championship during his teenage years.

=== Porsche Cup series ===
Hernandez driving in PCCF at the Red Bull Ring in 2023.

In 2023, Hernandez entered car racing in the Porsche Carrera Cup France, driving for ABM. He scored a best result of sixth at both Monza races and finished ninth in the championship. Hernandez remained in the series in 2024, joining Martinet/Forestier Racing. He again scored a best finish of sixth, ending up 12th overall. Hernandez also contested a round of the Porsche Supercup, placing 13th at Spa-Francorchamps. In addition, Hernandez drove a Porsche Cup car in the Ultimate GT Endurance Cup on three occasions; he won the season opener at Circuit Paul Ricard alongside Mathys Jaubert and Cédric Mezard.

=== Prototype racing ===
In late 2024, Hernandez joined the Cogemo Racing Team to race a Nova NP02 in the final round of the European Endurance Prototype Cup at Paul Ricard. Partnering Jesse Bouhet and rally driver Yohan Rossel, Hernandez took victory on his prototype debut. He subsequently signed up to drive in the European Endurance Prototype Cup on a full-time basis in 2025. After taking pole position for round two in Mugello, where he topped his qualifying group, Hernandez won round three at Portimão alongside Nico Prost and Erwin Creed. The trio made it back-to-back victories at Aragón, winning from pole position. They finished eighth at Magny-Cours but suffered a suspension failure at the season finale, thus dropping out of championship contention. Hernandez placed fifth in the drivers' standings.

In 2025, Hernandez sampled the Oreca 07 for the first time in a test with RD Limited. He then took part in the official ELMS post-season test at Portimão for TDS Racing, topping the time sheets overall by half a second. Hernandez signed with DKR Engineering to make his LMP2 debut in the 2026 ELMS season, partnering Jean Glorieux and Sebastián Álvarez in the LMP2 Pro-Am class, a season in which he scored a best result of fifth at Algarve. In parallel, Hernandez moved to Switch Racing to continue in the European Endurance Prototype Cup alongside Nano López and Romano Ricci.

== Karting record ==
=== Karting career summary ===
Season	Series	Team	Position
2018	National Series Karting — Nationale	RK Competition	56th
2019	IAME Winter Cup — X30 Junior	CBK	
2019	Championnat de France — Junior		15th
2019	IAME Euro Series — X30 Junior	KR France	37th
2019	Coupe de France — OK-J	KR France	NC
2019	Karting European Championship — OK-J	KR Motorsport	115th
2019	IAME International Final — X30 Junior		17th
2020	WSK Champions Cup — OK	VDK Racing	28th
2020	WSK Super Master Series — OK	VDK Racing	54th
2020	WSK Euro Series — OK	KR Motorsport	54th
2020	Champions of the Future — OK	KR Motorsport	42nd
2020	Karting European Championship — OK	KR Motorsport	53rd
2020	Championnat de France — Senior	CBK	52nd
2020	Karting World Championship — OK	KR Motorsport	39th
2020	WSK Open Cup — OK	KR Motorsport	18th
2021	WSK Champions Cup — OK	KR Motorsport	NC
2021	WSK Super Master Series — OK	KR Motorsport	37th
2021	WSK Euro Series — OK	KR Motorsport	23rd
2021	Champions of the Future — OK	KR Motorsport	35th
2021	Karting European Championship — OK	KR Motorsport	32nd

== Racing record ==
=== Racing career summary ===
Season	Series	Team	Races	Wins	Poles	F/Laps	Podiums	Points	Position
2023	Porsche Carrera Cup France	ABM	11	0	0	0	0	72	9th
2024	Porsche Carrera Cup France	Martinet/Forestier Racing	10	0	0	0	0	56	12nd
2024	Ultimate GT Endurance Cup – Porsche Cup	Martinet by Alméras	3	1	0	1	1	37	7th
2024	Porsche Supercup	Martinet/Forestier Racing	1	0	0	0	0	0	NC†
2024	European Endurance Prototype Cup – NP02	Cogemo Racing Team	1	1	0	0	1	25	19th
2025	European Endurance Prototype Cup	Cogemo Racing	6	2	2	0	2	63	5th
2026	European Le Mans Series – LMP2 Pro-Am	DKR Engineering	6	0	0	0	0	21	12th
2026	24 Hours of Le Mans – LMP2 Pro-Am	DKR Engineering	Reserve driver						
2026	European Endurance Prototype Cup	Switch Racing	4	1	1	0	1	26.75*	10th*

* Season still in progress.

^{†} As Hernandez was a guest driver, he was ineligible for points.

=== Complete Porsche Carrera Cup France results ===
(key) (Races in bold indicate pole position) (Races in italics indicate fastest lap)

Year	Team	1	2	3	4	5	6	7	8	9	10	11	12	Pos	Points
2023	ABM	CAT; 1; 8	CAT; 2; 17	MAG; 1; 7	MAG; 2; 7	LMS; Ret	RBR; 1; 7	RBR; 2; 10	MNZ; 1; 6	MNZ; 2; 6	LEC; 1; 11	LEC; 2; 11		9th	72
2024	Martinet/Forestier Racing	CAT; 1; 13	CAT; 2; 10	LEC; 1; 6	LEC; 2; 15	SPA; 1; 8	SPA; 2 Ret	DIJ; 1; 7	DIJ; 2; 12	MUG; 1	MUG; 2	ALG; 1; 9	ALG; 2; 9	12th	56

=== Complete Porsche Supercup results ===
(key) (Races in bold indicate pole position) (Races in italics indicate fastest lap)

Year	Team	1	2	3	4	5	6	7	8	Pos.	Points
2024	Martinet/Forestier Racing	IMO	MON	RBR	SIL	HUN	SPA; 14	ZAN	MNZ	NC†	0†

=== Complete European Endurance Prototype Cup results ===
(key) (Races in bold indicate pole position; results in italics indicate fastest lap)

Year	Entrant	Chassis	Engine	1	2	3	4	5	6	Rank	Points
2024	Cogemo Racing Team	Nova NP02	Ford Coyote 5.0 L V8	LEC1	ALG	HOC	MUG	MAG	LEC2; 1	21st	25
2025	Cogemo Racing	Nova NP02	Ford Coyote 5.0 L V8	LEC1; 6	**MUG**; 11	ALG; 1	**ARA**; 1	MAG; 8	LEC2; 18	5th	63
2026	Switch Racing	Nova NP02	Ford Coyote 5.0 L V8	LEC; 13	MAG; 20	MUG; 14	**SPA**; 1	NAV	ALG	10th*	26.75*

^{*} Season still in progress.

=== Complete European Le Mans Series results ===
(key) (Races in bold indicate pole position; results in italics indicate fastest lap)

Year	Entrant	Class	Chassis	Engine	1	2	3	4	5	6	Rank	Points
2026	DKR Engineering	LMP2 Pro-Am	Oreca 07	Gibson GK428 4.2 L V8	CAT; 8	LEC; 10	IMO; 8	SPA; 12	SIL; 9	ALG; 5	12th	21

^{*} Season still in progress.
