= Enzo Richer =

Luxembourgish-French racing driver (born 2006)

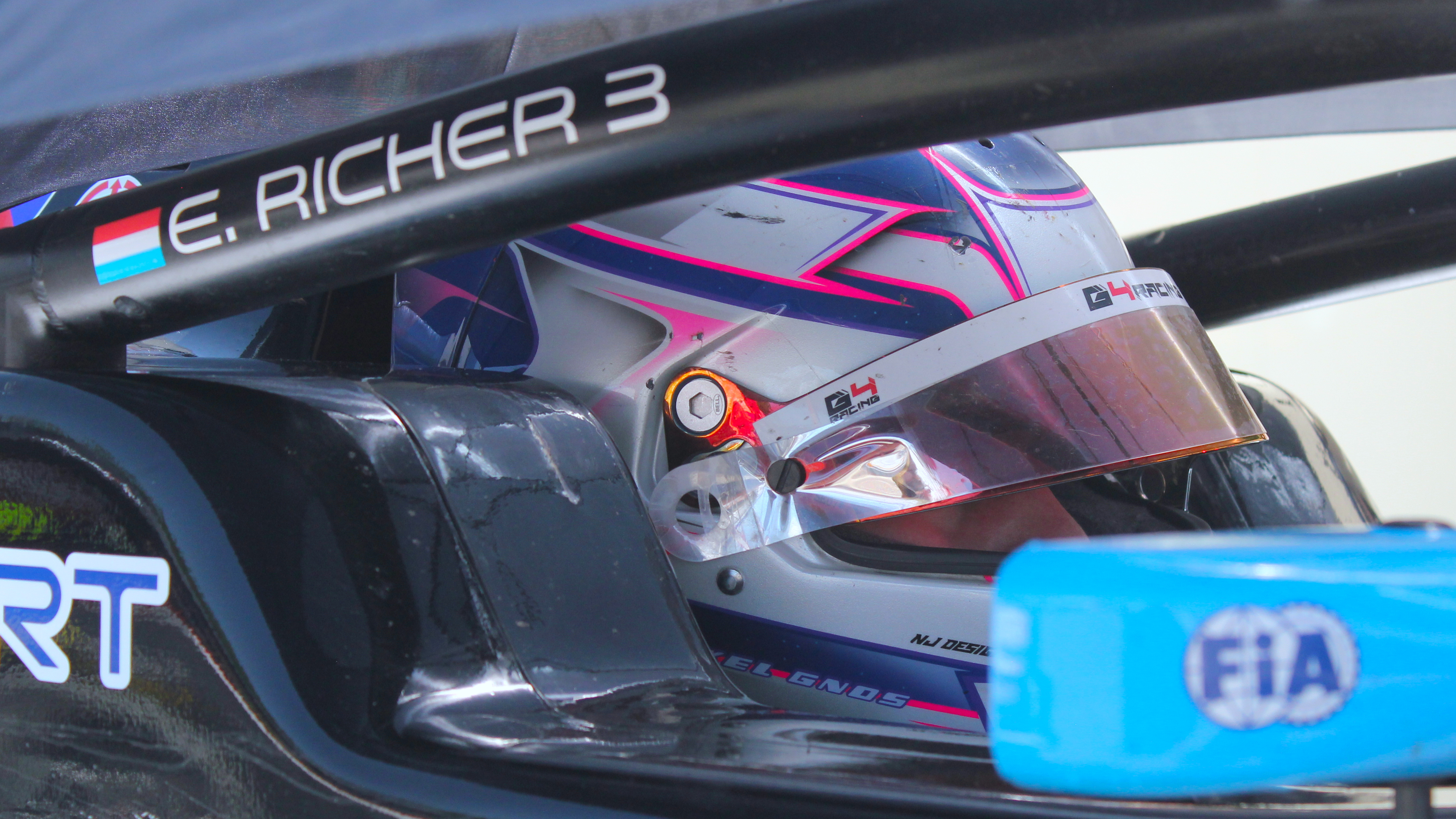
- Richer in 2025
- Nationality: (Luxembourg) Luxembourgish (France) French (Note: Richer, a dual citizen, competed under a French racing licence earlier in his career. Since 2024, he represents Luxembourg.)
- Born: 18 June 2006 (age 20) Thionville, France

French GT4 Cup career
- Debut season: 2026
- Current team: Mirage Racing
- Categorisation: FIA Silver
- Car number: 6
- Starts: 1 (1 entries)
- Wins: 0
- Podiums: 0
- Poles: 0
- Fastest laps: 0

Previous series
- 2025 2024 2023–2025 2021–2023: FR European Championship; Euroformula Open Championship; Ultimate Cup Series; French F4 Championship

Championship titles
- 2024: Ultimate Cup Series - Ultimate Formula Cup F3R

Enzo Richer (born 18 June 2006) is a Luxembourgish and French racing driver currently competing in the French GT4 Cup for Mirage Racing.

Richer was the 2024 Ultimate Cup Series champion in the Ultimate Formula Cup F3R class.

== Single-seater career ==
Richer started his single-seater career in the FFSA Academy centrally-run French F4 in 2021, joining as a guest driver from the Hungaroring round, having just turned 15. Although ineligible to score points, he managed a season-best finish of seventh at Monza. Richer made his full-time debut in French F4 in 2022, taking two points finishes at the Valencia round at the Circuit Ricardo Tormo, finishing eighth and tenth in races 1 and 3 respectively. He finished 17th in the championship. Richer returned to French F4 in 2023 for his second full campaign in the series. He took career-best finishes of fourth place at several rounds, including twice at the Nogaro season opener, and once at Magny-Cours and Lédenon, where he secured a 26-point haul. He improved to eighth in the overall standings with 76 points.

Richer stepped up to Formula Regional machinery in late 2023, as he made his Ultimate Cup Series debut at the Paul Ricard season finale. Racing for Graff Racing in the Challenge Monoplace category, he scored F3R-class podiums at each of the three races, with third place in races 1 and 2 followed by second in race 3. The following season saw Richer graduate from French F4 to compete full-time in the rebranded Ultimate Formula Cup F3R class with Formula Motorsport. Starting in the 17-inch class with a pair of wins at Le Castellet, Richer then switched to the 13-inch variant for the rest of 2024. He won four times across Portimão, Hockenheimring and Magny-Cours on course to winning the championship by 71.5 points to Frenchman Frédéric Boillot.

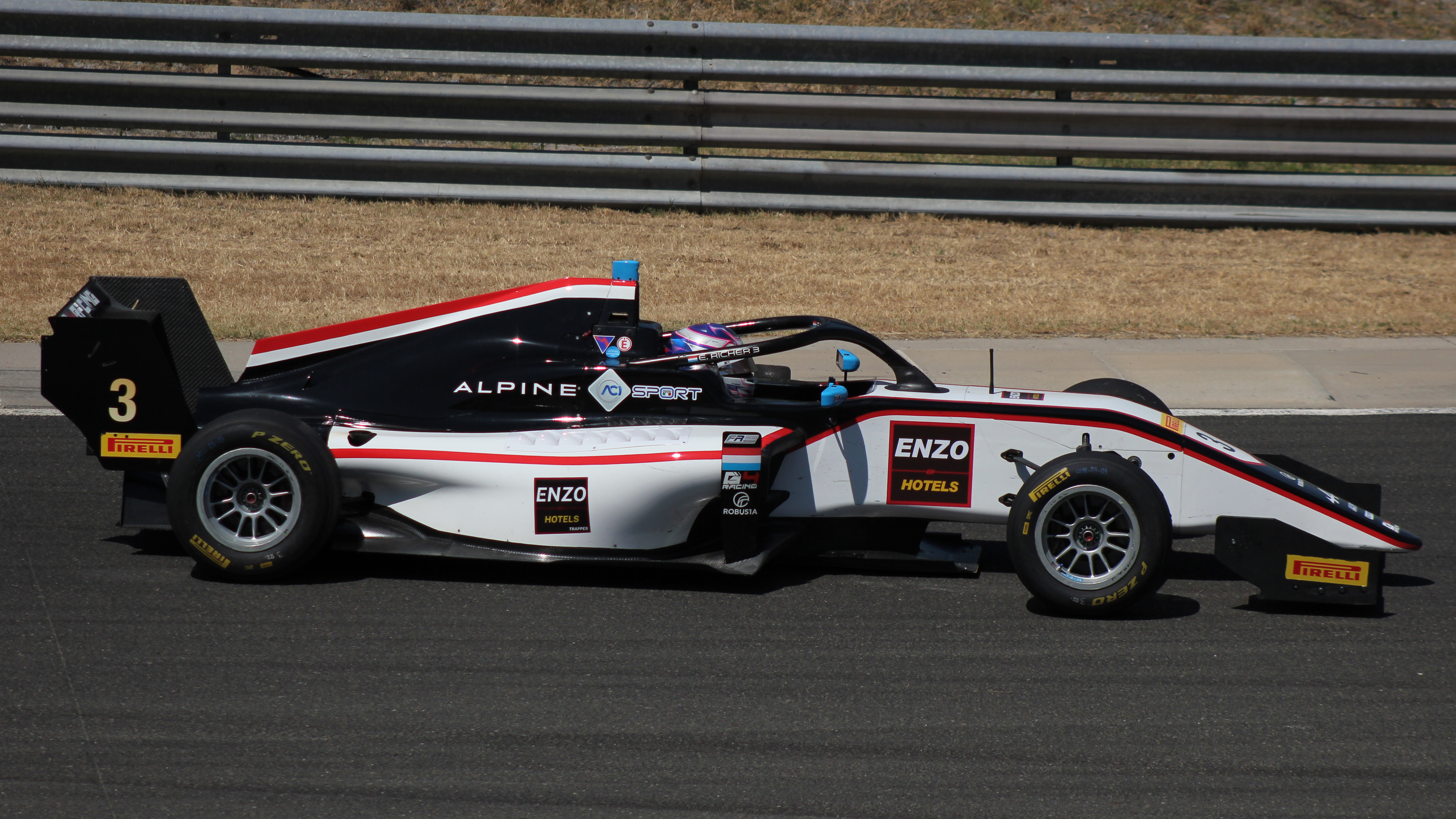
Richer driving for G4 Racing at the Hungaroring in FRECA in 2025.

Amid his Ultimate Cup Series stint, Richer made a one-off appearance for Team Motopark in Euroformula Open in 2024. He finished sixth twice at his home round of Le Castellet, with a retirement in race 1. These points allowed him to finish 14th in the championship. Richer only raced once in single-seaters in 2025, making a cameo at the Hungaroring round of the Formula Regional European Championship by Alpine with G4 Racing. He finished 24th and 19th respectively. By doing so, he became the first driver to race under the Luxembourgish flag in the championship.

== Sports car racing career ==
Richer remained in the Ultimate Cup Series in 2025 but switched to its sports car racing branch, racing a Nova NP02 prototype for Lamo Racing Car throughout the six-round European Endurance Prototype Cup. He scored a best finish of fifth at Magny-Cours, en route to 12th in the overall standings. At the end of the season, Richer sampled LMP3 machinery for the first time, driving Racing Spirit of Léman's Ligier JS P325 at the ELMS rookie test at Portimão.

In 2026, Richer made the move to GT4 racing, driving in the Pro-Am class of the FFSA's French GT4 Cup with Mirage Racing, as a candidate for the SRO GT Academy. He will share a Toyota GR Supra GT4 Evo2 with Kevin Jimenez.

== Racing record ==
=== Racing career summary ===
Season	Series	Team	Races	Wins	Poles	F/Laps	Podiums	Points	Position
2021	French F4 Championship	FFSA Academy	11	0	0	0	0	0	NC†
2022	French F4 Championship	FFSA Academy	21	0	0	0	0	8	17th
2023	French F4 Championship	FFSA Academy	21	0	0	0	0	76	8th
2023	Ultimate Cup Series Challenge Monoplace - F3R	Graff Racing	3	0	0	0	3	64	14th
2024	Ultimate Cup Series Challenge Monoplace - F3R (17 inch)	Formula Motorsport	3	2	0	0	3	80	**3rd**
2024	Ultimate Cup Series Challenge Monoplace - F3R (13 inch)	Formula Motorsport	15	4	4	4	14	362.5	**1st**
2024	Euroformula Open Championship	Team Motopark	3	0	0	0	0	16	14th
2025	European Endurance Prototype Cup - NP02	Lamo Racing Car	6	0	0	1	0	29	12th
2025	Formula Regional European Championship	G4 Racing	2	0	0	0	0	0	35th
2026	French GT4 Cup - Pro-Am	Mirage Racing							
2026	Ultimate Cup European Series - Hoosier Formula Cup	Lamo Racing Car							

^{†} As Richer was a guest driver, he was ineligible to score points.
* Season still in progress.

=== Complete French F4 Championship results ===
(key) (Races in bold indicate pole position) (Races in italics indicate fastest lap)

Year	1	2	3	4	5	6	7	8	9	10	11	12	13	14	15	16	17	18	19	20	21	Pos	Points
2021	NOG; 1	NOG; 2	NOG; 3	MAG1; 1	MAG1; 2	MAG1; 3	HUN; 1; 15	HUN; 2; 14	HUN; 3; 13	LÉD; 1	LÉD; 2	LÉD; 3	MNZ; 1; 7	MNZ; 2 Ret	MNZ; 3 C	LEC; 1; 12	LEC; 2; 19†	LEC; 3; 13	MAG2; 1 Ret	MAG2; 2; 10	MAG2; 3; 12	NC†	0
2022	NOG; 1; 17	NOG; 2 Ret	NOG; 3; 18	PAU; 1; 17	PAU; 2; 16	PAU; 3; 13	MAG; 1; 19	MAG; 2; 15	MAG; 3; 18	SPA; 1; 22†	SPA; 2; 16	SPA; 3; 16	LÉD; 1; 16	LÉD; 2; 13	LÉD; 3; 15	CRT; 1; 8	CRT; 2; 10	CRT; 3; 10	LEC; 1; 14	LEC; 2; 14	LEC; 3; 13	17th	8
2023	NOG; 1; 4	NOG; 2; 10	NOG; 3; 4	MAG; 1; 9	MAG; 2; 10	MAG; 3; 4	PAU; 1; 16	PAU; 2; 10	PAU; 3 Ret	SPA; 1; 13	SPA; 2; 13	SPA; 3; 13	MIS; 1; 12	MIS; 2; 6	MIS; 3; 9	LÉD; 1; 4	LÉD; 2; 5	LÉD; 3; 6	LEC; 1; 12	LEC; 2; 5	LEC; 3 Ret	8th	76

^{†} As Richer was a guest driver, he was ineligible to score points.

=== Complete Ultimate Cup Series – Challenge Monoplace results ===
(key) (Races in bold indicate pole position; results in italics indicate fastest lap)

Year	Entrant	Class	1	2	3	4	5	6	7	8	9	10	11	12	13	14	15	16	17	18	Pos	Points
2023	Graff Racing	F3R	LEC1; 1	LEC1; 2	LEC1; 3	NAV; 1	NAV; 2	NAV; 3	HOC; 1	HOC; 2	HOC; 3	EST; 1	EST; 2	EST; 3	MAG; 1	MAG; 2	MAG; 3	LEC2; 1; 3	LEC2; 2; 3	LEC2; 3; 2	14th	64
2024	Formula Motorsport	F3R – 17 inch	LEC1; 1; 1	LEC1; 2; 2	LEC1; 3; 1	POR; 1	POR; 2	POR; 3	HOC; 1	HOC; 2	HOC; 3	MUG; 1	MUG; 2	MUG; 3	MAG; 1	MAG; 2	MAG; 3	LEC2; 1	LEC2; 2	LEC2; 3	3rd	80
2024	Formula Motorsport	F3R – 13 inch	LEC1; 1	LEC1; 2	LEC1; 3	POR; 1; 2	POR; 2; 1	**POR**; **3**; 3	HOC; 1; 2	HOC; 2; 2	HOC; 3; 1	MUG; 1; 8*	MUG; 2; 2	MUG; 3; 3	MAG; 1; 1	**MAG**; **2**; 1	**MAG**; **3**; 2	LEC2; 1; 2	LEC2; 2; 2	**LEC2**; **3**; 3	1st	362.5

=== Complete Euroformula Open Championship results ===
(key) (Races in bold indicate pole position) (Races in italics indicate fastest lap)

Year	Team	1	2	3	4	5	6	7	8	9	10	11	12	13	14	15	16	17	18	19	20	21	22	23	24	DC	Points
2024	Team Motopark	PRT; 1	PRT; 2	PRT; 3	HOC; 1	HOC; 2	HOC; 3	SPA; 1	SPA; 2	SPA; 3	HUN; 1	HUN; 2	HUN; 3	LEC; 1 Ret	LEC; 2; 6	LEC; 3; 6	RBR; 1	RBR; 2	RBR; 3	CAT; 1	CAT; 2	CAT; 3	MNZ; 1	MNZ; 2	MNZ; 3	14th	16

=== Complete Formula Regional European Championship results ===
(key) (Races in bold indicate pole position) (Races in italics indicate fastest lap)

Year	Team	1	2	3	4	5	6	7	8	9	10	11	12	13	14	15	16	17	18	19	20	DC	Points
2025	G4 Racing	MIS; 1	MIS; 2	SPA; 1	SPA; 2	ZAN; 1	ZAN; 2	HUN; 1; 24	HUN; 2; 19	LEC; 1	LEC; 2	IMO; 1	IMO; 2	RBR; 1	RBR; 2	CAT; 1	CAT; 2	HOC; 1	HOC; 2	MNZ; 1	MNZ; 2	35th	0

^{*} Season still in progress.
