= 2027 Ultimate Cup Series =

Edition of motorsport championship

The 2027 Ultimate Cup European Series is scheduled to be the ninth season of the Ultimate Cup European Series. The Ultimate Cup Series is a program comprising multiple endurance and sprint championships across different classes of motor racing. The season is scheduled to be held over six weekends, starting in March and concluding in November. The Ultimate Winter Cup winter series that debuted in 2026 is not scheduled to return.

== Calendar ==
The 2027 calendar was announced on 30 September 2026. The series returned to holding its first and final event at Circuit Paul Ricard, while also returning to Misano World Circuit for the first time since 2022. The rounds at Circuit de Spa-Francorchamps and Circuito de Navarra dropped off the calendar.

Round	Circuit	Date	Map of circuit locations
1	(France) Circuit Paul Ricard, Le Castellet	5–7 March	2027 Ultimate Cup Series is located in Europe
2	(Italy) Misano World Circuit, Misano Adriatico	16–18 April	2027 Ultimate Cup Series is located in Europe
3	(Portugal) Algarve International Circuit, Portimão	14–16 May	2027 Ultimate Cup Series is located in Europe
4	(Italy) Mugello Circuit, Scarperia e San Piero	9–11 July	2027 Ultimate Cup Series is located in Europe
5	(France) Circuit de Nevers Magny-Cours, Magny-Cours	24–26 September	2027 Ultimate Cup Series is located in Europe
6	(France) Circuit Paul Ricard, Le Castellet	TBC November	2027 Ultimate Cup Series is located in Europe

== Hoosier Formula Cup ==
The Hoosier Formula Cup is open to Tatuus F3R T318 cars powered by either Alfa Romeo or Renault engines on 13-inch Hoosier tyres.

=== Standings ===
==== Scoring system ====
Points will be awarded to all finishers as follows:

Position	1st	2nd	3rd	4th	5th	6th	7th	8th	9th	10th	11th+
Points	25	18	15	12	10	8	6	4	2	1	0.5

- If a driver completed less than 75% percent, but more than 50% of the laps (rounded down) the driver classified first in their class completed, they will be awarded half points.
- A driver not completing at least 50% of the distance of the driver classified first in their class will not score any points.
- Should the driver classified first in a class not complete at least 50% of the distance of the driver classified first overall, no driver in said class will score points towards the class standings.
- Should a driver be the only competitor in a class, they have to have completed at least 50% of the distance of the driver classified first overall to score any points towards said class.
