= 2026 Ultimate Cup European Series =

Edition of motorsport championship

The 2026 Ultimate Cup European Series is the eighth season of the Ultimate Cup European Series. The Ultimate Cup Series is a program comprising multiple endurance and sprint championships across different classes of motor racing. 2026 saw the championship hold a two-race winter series ahead of its main season for the first time.

The season was overshadowed by the death of Hoosier Formula Cup gentleman driver Walter Rykart, who passed away between the first and the second round of the season at the age of 66 years.

== Calendar ==
The 2026 calendar was announced on 30 July 2025. The series will no longer hold two events at Circuit Paul Ricard, instead holding the final round at Algarve International Circuit and also making its debut at Circuit de Spa-Francorchamps. In November 2025, the calendar was updated: The round at Motorland Aragón was replaced with a round at Circuito de Navarra one week earlier, while the final round at Algarve International Circuit was brought forward by three weeks. In April 2026, the calendar was updated again, with the final round postponed by three weeks.

Round	Circuit	Date	Supporting	Map of circuit locations
1	(France) Circuit Paul Ricard, Le Castellet	23–26 April	TCR Spain Touring Car Championship; Renault Clio Cup Europe; Legends Cars Cup European Nations Series	2026 Ultimate Cup European Series is located in Europe
2	(France) Circuit de Nevers Magny-Cours, Magny-Cours	28–31 May	Renault Clio Cup Europe; Legends Cars Cup European Nations Series	2026 Ultimate Cup European Series is located in Europe
3	(Italy) Mugello Circuit, Scarperia e San Piero	9–12 July	Renault Clio Cup Europe	2026 Ultimate Cup European Series is located in Europe
4	(Belgium) Circuit de Spa-Francorchamps, Stavelot	17–20 September	Renault Clio Cup Europe; Legends Cars Cup European Nations Series	2026 Ultimate Cup European Series is located in Europe
5	(Spain) Circuito de Navarra, Los Arcos	15–18 October	Renault Clio Cup Europe	2026 Ultimate Cup European Series is located in Europe
6	(Portugal) Algarve International Circuit, Portimão	26–29 November	Renault Clio Cup Europe	2026 Ultimate Cup European Series is located in Europe

== European Endurance Prototype Cup ==
The European Endurance Prototype Cup is open to Nova Proto NP02 cars.

=== Teams and drivers ===
Team	Chassis	Engine	No.	Drivers	Cla.	Rounds
NP02
(France) 23 Events Racing	Nova Proto NP02	Ford Coyote 5.0 L V8	1	(Australia) James Winslow		
(France) 23 Events Racing	Nova Proto NP02	Ford Coyote 5.0 L V8	1	(United Arab Emirates) Alim Geshev		
(France) 23 Events Racing	Nova Proto NP02	Ford Coyote 5.0 L V8	1	(United Arab Emirates) Harry Hannam		
(France) 23 Events Racing	Nova Proto NP02	Ford Coyote 5.0 L V8	23	(France) Augustin Bernier	AM	
(France) 23 Events Racing	Nova Proto NP02	Ford Coyote 5.0 L V8	23	(France) Gilles Hériau	AM	
(France) 23 Events Racing	Nova Proto NP02	Ford Coyote 5.0 L V8	23	(France) Arlan Boulain	AM	
(France) 23 Events Racing	Nova Proto NP02	Ford Coyote 5.0 L V8	27	(France) Maxence Maurice	AM	
(France) 23 Events Racing	Nova Proto NP02	Ford Coyote 5.0 L V8	27	(France) Christophe Cresp	AM	
(Luxembourg) DKR Engineering	Nova Proto NP02	Ford Coyote 5.0 L V8	3	(Germany) Laurents Hörr		
(Luxembourg) DKR Engineering	Nova Proto NP02	Ford Coyote 5.0 L V8	3	(United States) Jon Brownson		
(Luxembourg) DKR Engineering	Nova Proto NP02	Ford Coyote 5.0 L V8	3	(Estonia) Antti Rammo		
(Luxembourg) DKR Engineering	Nova Proto NP02	Ford Coyote 5.0 L V8	3	(Belgium) Bernard Delhez		
(France) Switch Racing	Nova Proto NP02	Ford Coyote 5.0 L V8	4	(France) Sandro Prissoutti		
(France) Switch Racing	Nova Proto NP02	Ford Coyote 5.0 L V8	4	(France) Louis Rossi		
(France) Switch Racing	Nova Proto NP02	Ford Coyote 5.0 L V8	4	(Malaysia) Alister Yoong		
(France) Switch Racing	Nova Proto NP02	Ford Coyote 5.0 L V8	13	(France) Marlon Hernandez		
(France) Switch Racing	Nova Proto NP02	Ford Coyote 5.0 L V8	13	(Argentina) Nano López		
(France) Switch Racing	Nova Proto NP02	Ford Coyote 5.0 L V8	13	(France) Romano Ricci		
(France) ANS Motorsport	Nova Proto NP02	Ford Coyote 5.0 L V8	6	(Mexico) Ian Aguilera		
(France) ANS Motorsport	Nova Proto NP02	Ford Coyote 5.0 L V8	6	(France) Adrien Chila		
(France) ANS Motorsport	Nova Proto NP02	Ford Coyote 5.0 L V8	6	(France) Pacome Weisenburger		
(France) ANS Motorsport	Nova Proto NP02	Ford Coyote 5.0 L V8	71	(Spain) Mikkel Kristensen		
(France) ANS Motorsport	Nova Proto NP02	Ford Coyote 5.0 L V8	71	(Switzerland) Nicolas Maulini		
(France) ANS Motorsport	Nova Proto NP02	Ford Coyote 5.0 L V8	71	(Colombia) Pedro Juan Moreno		
(France) ANS Motorsport	Nova Proto NP02	Ford Coyote 5.0 L V8	71	(France) Jacques Wolff		
(France) ANS Motorsport	Nova Proto NP02	Ford Coyote 5.0 L V8	72	(France) Adrien Yvon	AM	
(France) ANS Motorsport	Nova Proto NP02	Ford Coyote 5.0 L V8	72	(France) Alexandre Yvon	AM	
(France) ANS Motorsport	Nova Proto NP02	Ford Coyote 5.0 L V8	72	(France) Jean-François Yvon	AM	
(France) ANS Motorsport	Nova Proto NP02	Ford Coyote 5.0 L V8	73	(France) Frédéric Croullet		
(France) ANS Motorsport	Nova Proto NP02	Ford Coyote 5.0 L V8	73	(France) Grégoire Croullet		
(France) ANS Motorsport	Nova Proto NP02	Ford Coyote 5.0 L V8	73	(France) Louis Iglesias		
(France) Extreme Limite	Nova Proto NP02	Ford Coyote 5.0 L V8	7	(France) Victor Bernier		
(France) Extreme Limite	Nova Proto NP02	Ford Coyote 5.0 L V8	7	(Lebanon) Shahan Sarkissian		
(France) Extreme Limite	Nova Proto NP02	Ford Coyote 5.0 L V8	7	(Belgium) Lucas Taelman		
(France) Extreme Limite	Nova Proto NP02	Ford Coyote 5.0 L V8	7	(France) Jean-Ludovic Foubert		
(France) Graff Racing	Nova Proto NP02	Ford Coyote 5.0 L V8	8	(Switzerland) Alexandre Coigny		
(France) Graff Racing	Nova Proto NP02	Ford Coyote 5.0 L V8	8	(Switzerland) David Droux		
(France) Graff Racing	Nova Proto NP02	Ford Coyote 5.0 L V8	8	(Belgium) Quentin Joseph		
(France) Graff Racing	Nova Proto NP02	Ford Coyote 5.0 L V8	9	(Switzerland) Sébastien Page	AM	
(France) Graff Racing	Nova Proto NP02	Ford Coyote 5.0 L V8	9	(Switzerland) Luis Sanjuan	AM	
(France) Graff Racing	Nova Proto NP02	Ford Coyote 5.0 L V8	9	(France) Eric Trouillet	AM	
(France) SKR Performance by Graff	Nova Proto NP02	Ford Coyote 5.0 L V8	57	(France) Vincent Capillaire		
(France) SKR Performance by Graff	Nova Proto NP02	Ford Coyote 5.0 L V8	57	(Switzerland) Stephan Rupp		
(France) SKR Performance by Graff	Nova Proto NP02	Ford Coyote 5.0 L V8	57	(France) William Vermont		
(Spain) CD Sport	Nova Proto NP02	Ford Coyote 5.0 L V8	10	(France) Philippe Cimadomo		
(Spain) CD Sport	Nova Proto NP02	Ford Coyote 5.0 L V8	10	(Belgium) Nigel Bailly		
(Spain) CD Sport	Nova Proto NP02	Ford Coyote 5.0 L V8	10	(Mexico) Maximiliano Mora		
(Spain) CD Sport	Nova Proto NP02	Ford Coyote 5.0 L V8	28	(France) Jérémy Clavaud		
(Spain) CD Sport	Nova Proto NP02	Ford Coyote 5.0 L V8	28	(France) Emmanuel Piget		
(Spain) CD Sport	Nova Proto NP02	Ford Coyote 5.0 L V8	28	(Denmark) Theodor Jensen		
(Spain) CD Sport	Nova Proto NP02	Ford Coyote 5.0 L V8	28	(France) Nicolas Melin		
(Spain) CD Sport	Nova Proto NP02	Ford Coyote 5.0 L V8	30	(South Africa) Nick Adcock	AM	
(Spain) CD Sport	Nova Proto NP02	Ford Coyote 5.0 L V8	30	(Denmark) Michael Jensen	AM	
(France) Lamo Racing Car	Nova Proto NP02	Ford Coyote 5.0 L V8	17	(France) Alexandre Lafourcade		
(France) Lamo Racing Car	Nova Proto NP02	Ford Coyote 5.0 L V8	17	(Switzerland) Loris Kyburz		
(France) Lamo Racing Car	Nova Proto NP02	Ford Coyote 5.0 L V8	17	(United States) Shawn Rashid		
(France) Lamo Racing Car	Nova Proto NP02	Ford Coyote 5.0 L V8	17	(France) Frédéric Morel		
(France) Lamo Racing Car	Nova Proto NP02	Ford Coyote 5.0 L V8	17	(Denmark) Kevin Verner		
(France) Lamo Racing Car	Nova Proto NP02	Ford Coyote 5.0 L V8	17	(Switzerland) Caryl Fritsche		
(France) Lamo Racing Car	Nova Proto NP02	Ford Coyote 5.0 L V8	24	(France) Gregory Segers	AM	
(France) Lamo Racing Car	Nova Proto NP02	Ford Coyote 5.0 L V8	24	(France) Benoit Farines	AM	
(France) Lamo Racing Car	Nova Proto NP02	Ford Coyote 5.0 L V8	24	(France) Alexandre Leroy	AM	
(France) DB Autosport by MB Performance	Nova Proto NP02	Ford Coyote 5.0 L V8	20	(France) Romain Carton	AM	
(France) DB Autosport by MB Performance	Nova Proto NP02	Ford Coyote 5.0 L V8	20	(France) Pierre Couasnon	AM	
(France) DB Autosport by MB Performance	Nova Proto NP02	Ford Coyote 5.0 L V8	20	(United States) Steven Thomas	AM	
(France) DB Autosport by MB Performance	Nova Proto NP02	Ford Coyote 5.0 L V8	21	(Switzerland) Mathias Beche		
(France) DB Autosport by MB Performance	Nova Proto NP02	Ford Coyote 5.0 L V8	21	(France) Paul Trojani		
(France) DB Autosport by MB Performance	Nova Proto NP02	Ford Coyote 5.0 L V8	21	(France) Quenton Bassora		
(France) DB Autosport by MB Performance	Nova Proto NP02	Ford Coyote 5.0 L V8	22	(Portugal) Léandre Carvalho	AM	
(France) DB Autosport by MB Performance	Nova Proto NP02	Ford Coyote 5.0 L V8	22	(Germany) Jens Petersen	AM	
(France) DB Autosport by MB Performance	Nova Proto NP02	Ford Coyote 5.0 L V8	22	(France) Léo Payen	AM	
(Switzerland) Haegeli by T2 Racing	Nova Proto NP02	Ford Coyote 5.0 L V8	66	(Netherlands) Mitchell van Dijk		
(Switzerland) Haegeli by T2 Racing	Nova Proto NP02	Ford Coyote 5.0 L V8	66	(Germany) Marc Basseng		
(Switzerland) Haegeli by T2 Racing	Nova Proto NP02	Ford Coyote 5.0 L V8	66	(Switzerland) Pieder Decurtins		
(France) M Racing	Nova Proto NP02	Ford Coyote 5.0 L V8	68	(Netherlands) Dane Arendsen		
(France) M Racing	Nova Proto NP02	Ford Coyote 5.0 L V8	68	(United Kingdom) Chris Short		
(France) M Racing	Nova Proto NP02	Ford Coyote 5.0 L V8	68	(South Africa) Jonathan Thomas		
(France) Nerguti Competition by M Racing	Nova Proto NP02	Ford Coyote 5.0 L V8	99	(France) Cindy Gudet	AM	
(France) Nerguti Competition by M Racing	Nova Proto NP02	Ford Coyote 5.0 L V8	99	(France) Martin Lacquemanne	AM	
(France) Nerguti Competition by M Racing	Nova Proto NP02	Ford Coyote 5.0 L V8	99	(France) Alban Nerguti	AM	
(France) Zosh - Knauf	Nova Proto NP02	Ford Coyote 5.0 L V8	70	(Belgium) Xavier Knauf	AM	
(France) Zosh - Knauf	Nova Proto NP02	Ford Coyote 5.0 L V8	70	(France) Thierry Petit	AM	
(France) Zosh - Knauf	Nova Proto NP02	Ford Coyote 5.0 L V8	70	(Belgium) Grégory Servais	AM	
(France) Zosh - J4R - Projet 24	Nova Proto NP02	Ford Coyote 5.0 L V8	77	(France) Paul Alberto		
(France) Zosh - J4R - Projet 24	Nova Proto NP02	Ford Coyote 5.0 L V8	77	(France) Arnold Robin		
(France) Zosh - J4R - Projet 24	Nova Proto NP02	Ford Coyote 5.0 L V8	77	(France) Julien Rodrigues		
(Belgium) BDR Competition	Nova Proto NP02	Ford Coyote 5.0 L V8	74	(France) Dimitri Enjalbert		
(Belgium) BDR Competition	Nova Proto NP02	Ford Coyote 5.0 L V8	74	(France) Anthony Nahra		
(Belgium) BDR Competition	Nova Proto NP02	Ford Coyote 5.0 L V8	74	(France) Louis Stern		
(France) Cogemo Racing	Nova Proto NP02	Ford Coyote 5.0 L V8	88	(France) Nicolas Chartier		
(France) Cogemo Racing	Nova Proto NP02	Ford Coyote 5.0 L V8	88	(Switzerland) Neel Jani		
(France) Cogemo Racing	Nova Proto NP02	Ford Coyote 5.0 L V8	88	(Chile) Nico Pino		
(France) Cogemo Racing	Nova Proto NP02	Ford Coyote 5.0 L V8	154	(Mexico) Sebastián Álvarez		
(France) Cogemo Racing	Nova Proto NP02	Ford Coyote 5.0 L V8	154	(France) Erwin Creed		
(France) Cogemo Racing	Nova Proto NP02	Ford Coyote 5.0 L V8	154	(France) Nicolas Prost		
(France) Cogemo Racing	Nova Proto NP02	Ford Coyote 5.0 L V8	154	(France) Stéphane Tribaudini		
(France) Cogemo Racing	Nova Proto NP02	Ford Coyote 5.0 L V8	386	(France) Nathan Pozmentier		
(France) Cogemo Racing	Nova Proto NP02	Ford Coyote 5.0 L V8	386	(Switzerland) Aubin Robert-Prince		
(France) Cogemo Racing	Nova Proto NP02	Ford Coyote 5.0 L V8	386	(Switzerland) Laurent Wuthrich		
(France) Cogemo Racing	Nova Proto NP02	Ford Coyote 5.0 L V8	555	(France) Denis Caillon	AM	
(France) Cogemo Racing	Nova Proto NP02	Ford Coyote 5.0 L V8	555	(France) Sebastien Morales	AM	
(France) Cogemo Racing	Nova Proto NP02	Ford Coyote 5.0 L V8	555	(France) Philippe Thirion	AM	
(Switzerland) Syselcom Racing Team	Nova Proto NP02	Ford Coyote 5.0 L V8	95	(France) Enzo Caldaras		
(Switzerland) Syselcom Racing Team	Nova Proto NP02	Ford Coyote 5.0 L V8	95	(France) Gwenaël Delomier		
(Switzerland) Syselcom Racing Team	Nova Proto NP02	Ford Coyote 5.0 L V8	95	(France) Alexandre Monnot		
(France) FTW Racing	Nova Proto NP02	Ford Coyote 5.0 L V8	500	(France) Hugo Lacasse	AM	
(France) FTW Racing	Nova Proto NP02	Ford Coyote 5.0 L V8	500	(France) David Monclair	AM	
Entry lists:

=== Championship standings ===
==== Drivers' standings ====
Pos.	Drivers	Team	(France) LEC	(France) MAG	(Italy) MUG	(Belgium) SPA	(Spain) NAV	(Portugal) ALG	Points
1	(Mexico) Ian Aguilera	(France) ANS Motorsport	1	**9**	1	5	2		92.5
1	(France) Pacôme Weisenburger	(France) ANS Motorsport	1	**9**	1	5	2		92.5
1	(France) Adrien Chila	(France) ANS Motorsport	1	**9**	1	5	2		92.5
2	(France) Nicolas Prost	(France) Cogemo Racing Team	3	4	**3**	2	1		92.5
2	(France) Erwin Creed	(France) Cogemo Racing Team	3	4	**3**	2	1		92.5
3	(Mexico) Sebastián Álvarez	(France) Cogemo Racing Team	3	4		2	1		77.5
4	(France) Jeremy Clavaud	(Spain) CD Sport	26	1	6	3	16		49.25
5	(France) Vincent Capillaire	(France) SKR Performance by Graff	9	3	4	17	4		30
5	(France) William Vermont	(France) SKR Performance by Graff	9	3	4	17	4		30
6	(Denmark) Theodor Jensen	(Spain) CD Sport	26	1	6				36.25
6	(Denmark) Theodor Jensen	(France) ANS Motorsport				9	12		36.25
7	(Switzerland) Stéphan Rupp	(France) SKR Performance by Graff	9	3	4	17			30.5
8	(France) Sébastien Morales	(France) Cogemo Racing Team	2	21	20	20	18		29
8	(France) Philippe Thirion	(France) Cogemo Racing Team	2	21	20	20	18		29
8	(France) Denis Caillon	(France) Cogemo Racing Team	2	21	20	20	18		29
9	(France) Paul Alberto	(France) Zosh - J4R - Projet 24	**5**	Ret	22	4	22		28
9	(France) Arnold Robin	(France) Zosh - J4R - Projet 24	**5**	Ret	22	4	22		28
10	(France) Augustin Bernier	(France) 23Events Racing	12	6	2	24	23		27.75
10	(France) Gilles Hériau	(France) 23Events Racing	12	6	2	24	23		27.75
10	(France) Arlan Boulain	(France) 23Events Racing	12	6	2	24	23		27.75
11	(France) Marlon Hernandez	(France) Switch Racing	13	20	14	**1**	20		27.25
11	(Argentina) Nano López	(France) Switch Racing	13	20	14	**1**	20		27.25
11	(France) Romano Ricci	(France) Switch Racing	13	20	14	**1**	20		27.25
12	(Belgium) Grégory Servais	(France) Zosh - Knauf	Ret	2	11	6	19		27
12	(France) Thierry Petit	(France) Zosh - Knauf		2	11	6	19		27
13	(Australia) James Winslow	(France) 23Events Racing	4	7	9	19			26.5
14	(France) Emmanuel Piget	(Spain) CD Sport	26	1					25.75
15	(United Arab Emirates) Alim Geshev	(France) 23Events Racing	4	7		19			24.5
16	(France) Alban Nerguti	(France) Nerguti Competition by M Racing	10	8	10	29	3		22
16	(France) Martin Lacquemanne	(France) Nerguti Competition by M Racing	10	8	10	29	3		22
16	(France) Cindy Gudet	(France) Nerguti Competition by M Racing	10	8	10	29	3		22
17	(France) Victor Bernier	(France) Extreme Limite	7	5	13	26	9		22
18	(Belgium) Xavier Knauf	(France) Zosh - Knauf	Ret	2			19		18.5
19	(Andorra) Franck Porte Ruiz	(Spain) CD Sport				3	16		15.5
19	(France) Fabien Lavergne	(Spain) CD Sport				3	16		15.5
20	(France) Stéphane Tribaudini	(France) Cogemo Racing Team			**3**				15
21	(France) Jean René de Fournoux	(France) Zosh - J4R - Projet 24	**5**	Ret					15
22	(France) Julien Rodrigues	(France) Zosh - J4R - Projet 24			22	4	22		13
23	(Lebanon) Shahan Sarkissian	(France) Extreme Limite		5	13	26	9		13
24	(France) Alexandre Lafourcade	(France) Lamo Racing Car	6	16	31				13
25	(United States) Shawn Rashid	(France) Lamo Racing Car	6						12.5
25	(United States) Shawn Rashid	(France) ANS Motorsport					12		12.5
26	(Switzerland) Loris Kyburz	(France) Lamo Racing Car	6	16					12.5
27	(Russia) Maksim Arkhangelskiy	(France) SKR Performance by Graff					4		12
28	(Germany) Laurents Hörr	(Luxembourg) DKR Engineering	11	29	25	7	8		11.75
29	(France) Maxence Maurice	(France) 23Events Racing	28	26	28	8	7		11.75
30	(Switzerland) Danny Buntschu	(Belgium) BDR Competition	Ret	25	26	18	5		11.5
31	(Estonia) Antti Rammo	(Luxembourg) DKR Engineering	11		25	7	8		11.25
32	(Belgium) Amaury Bonduel	(Belgium) BDR Competition	Ret	25	26		5		11
33	(France) Louis Maurice	(France) 23Events Racing		26	28	8	7		11
34	(France) Pierre Couasnon	(France) DB Autosport by MB Performance	27	Ret	5	Ret	Ret		10.75
35	(France) Nathan Pozmentier	(France) Cogemo Racing Team	18	10	15	13	6		10.75
35	(Switzerland) Aubin Robert-Prince	(France) Cogemo Racing Team	18	10	15	13	6		10.75
35	(Switzerland) Laurent Wuthrich	(France) Cogemo Racing Team	18	10	15	13	6		10.75
36	(France) Paul Trojani	(France) DB Autosport by MB Performance	Ret	31	5	Ret	Ret		10.5
37	(France) Sami Meguetounif	(France) DB Autosport by MB Performance			5				10
38	(Poland) Jacek Zielonka	(Belgium) BDR Competition					5		10
39	(Belgium) Lucas Taelman	(France) Extreme Limite	7						9
40	(France) Nicolas Melin	(Spain) CD Sport			6				8
41	(Germany) Marc Basseng	(Switzerland) Haegli by T2 Racing	Ret	32	7	14	10		6.5
41	(Switzerland) Pieder Decurtins	(Switzerland) Haegli by T2 Racing	Ret	32	7	14	10		6.5
42	(United States) Jon Brownson	(Luxembourg) DKR Engineering	11	29	25	7	WD		7.75
43	(France) Enzo Caldaras	(Switzerland) Syselcom Racing Team	8	22	34	28	Ret		7.5
43	(France) Gwenaël Delomier	(Switzerland) Syselcom Racing Team	8	22	34	28	Ret		7.5
44	(Netherlands) Mitchell van Dijk	(Switzerland) Haegli by T2 Racing	Ret	32	7				6.5
45	(Netherlands) Dane Arendsen	(France) M Racing	16	12	8	25	14		6.25
45	(South Africa) Jonathan Thomas	(France) M Racing	16	12	8	25	14		6.25
46	(France) Evan Giltaire	(France) 23Events Racing					7		6
47	(France) Romain Boeckler	(Switzerland) Syselcom Racing Team	8						6
48	(United Kingdom) Christian Short	(France) M Racing	16	12	8	25			5.75
49	(France) Christophe Cresp	(France) 23Events Racing	28	26	28	8			5.75
50	(Switzerland) Neel Jani	(France) Cogemo Racing Team	14	13	21	10	18		3.25
50	(France) Nicolas Chartier	(France) Cogemo Racing Team	14	13	21	10	18		3.25
51	(France) Jean-Ludovic Foubert	(France) Extreme Limite			13	26	9		3
52	(Switzerland) David Droux	(France) Graff Racing	23	14	32	11	25		2.75
52	(Belgium) Quentin Joseph	(France) Graff Racing	23	14	32	11	25		2.75
53	(Denmark) Michael Jensen	(Spain) CD Sport	25	15	19	12	13		2.75
53	(South Africa) Nick Adcock	(Spain) CD Sport	25	15	19	12	13		2.75
54	(France) Gregory Segers	(France) Lamo Racing Car	17	27	27	15	12		2.75
54	(France) Benoit Farines	(France) Lamo Racing Car	17	27	27	15	12		2.75
54	(France) Alexandre Leroy	(France) Lamo Racing Car	17	27	27	15	12		2.75
55	(France) Adrien Closmenil	(France) ANS Motorsport				9	12		2.5
56	(Malaysia) Alister Yoong	(France) Switch Racing	15	17	12	Ret	**15**		2.25
56	(France) Louis Rossi	(France) Switch Racing	15	17	12	Ret	**15**		2.25
57	(France) Hugo Lacasse	(France) FTW Racing	19	19	29		21		2.25
57	(France) David Monclair	(France) FTW Racing	19	19	29		21		2.25
58	(France) Eric Trouillet	(France) Graff Racing	20	24	30	22			2.25
59	(France) Alexandre Yvon	(France) ANS Motorsport	22	28	24	23	Ret		2.25
59	(France) Adrien Yvon	(France) ANS Motorsport	22	28	24	23	Ret		2.25
60	(France) Louis Stern	(Belgium) BDR Competition	Ret						2
60	(France) Louis Stern	(France) ANS Motorsport				9			2
61	(United Arab Emirates) Harry Hannam	(France) 23Events Racing			9				2
62	(Switzerland) Nicolas Maulini	(France) ANS Motorsport	Ret	11	17	16	24		2
62	(France) Jacques Wolff	(France) ANS Motorsport	Ret	11	17	16	24		2
63	(France) Quentin Bassora	(France) DB Autosport by MB Performance	Ret	31	16	30	26		2
64	(France) Sandro Perissoutti	(France) Switch Racing	15		12	Ret	**15**		1.75
65	(Chile) Nico Pino	(France) Cogemo Racing Team	14		21		18		1.75
66	(Portugal) Léandre Carvalho	(France) DB Autosport by MB Performance	21	Ret	18	Ret	26		1.75
66	(Germany) Jens Petersen	(France) DB Autosport by MB Performance	21	Ret	18	Ret	26		1.75
67	(Switzerland) Sébastien Page	(France) Graff Racing	20		30	22			1.75
68	(France) Jean-François Yvon	(France) ANS Motorsport	22	28		23	Ret		1.75
69	(Belgium) Nigel Bailly	(Spain) CD Sport	24	30	Ret	27	Ret		1.75
69	(Mexico) Maximiliano Mora	(Spain) CD Sport	24	30	Ret	27			1.75
70	(Spain) Mikkel Kristensen	(France) ANS Motorsport			17	16	24		1.5
71	(France) Léo Payen	(France) DB Autosport by MB Performance	21	Ret	18				1.75
72	(Switzerland) Luis Sanjuan	(France) Graff Racing	20	24					1.25
73	(France) Philippe Cimadomo	(Spain) CD Sport	24	30	Ret		Ret		
74	(France) Julien Canal	(France) Cogemo Racing Team				10			
75	(France) Dimitri Enjalbert	(Belgium) BDR Competition	Ret	18	23				1
75	(France) Anthony Nahra	(Belgium) BDR Competition	Ret	18	23				1
75	(France) Jean-Baptiste Meusnier	(Belgium) BDR Competition		18	23				1
76	(France) Xavier Bourlard	(Belgium) BDR Competition			26	18			1
77	(Denmark) Kevin Verner	(France) Lamo Racing Car			31	21			1
78	(France) Grégoire Croullet	(France) ANS Motorsport	Ret	23	33				1
78	(France) Frédéric Croullet	(France) ANS Motorsport		23	33				1
79	(France) Alexis Størksen	(Switzerland) Syselcom Racing Team			34	28	Ret		1
80	(Switzerland) Alexandre Coigny	(France) Graff Racing	23						0.75
81	(France) Romain Carton	(France) DB Autosport by MB Performance	27	Ret					0.75
81	(United States) Steven Thomas	(France) DB Autosport by MB Performance	27						0.75
82	(Colombia) Pedro Juan Moreno	(France) ANS Motorsport	Ret	11					0.5
83	(Switzerland) Fabio Scherer	(Switzerland) Haegli by T2 Racing				14			0.5
84	(France) Jean-Christophe David	(France) M Racing					14		0.5
85	(France) Frédéric Morel	(France) Lamo Racing Car		16					0.5
86	(Germany) Lenny Ried	(France) DB Autosport by MB Performance			16	Ret			0.5
86	(France) Vladislav Lomko	(France) DB Autosport by MB Performance			16				0.5
87	(Denmark) Mikkel Gaarde Pedersen	(France) Lamo Racing Car				21			0.5
87	(Denmark) Peter Hegelund	(France) Lamo Racing Car				21			0.5
88	(Andorra) Maxime Courtemanche	(France) FTW Racing					21		0.5
89	(France) Rayan Caretti	(Spain) CD Sport				27			0.5
90	(Belgium) Bernard Delhez	(Luxembourg) DKR Engineering		29					0.5
91	(Luxembourg) Enzo Richer	(Belgium) BDR Competition				30			0.5
92	(Switzerland) Mathias Beche	(Belgium) BDR Competition	Ret	31			Ret		0.5
93	(Switzerland) Caryl Fritsche	(France) Lamo Racing Car			31				1
	(France) Louis Iglesias	(France) ANS Motorsport	Ret						0
	(France) Paul Lanchère	(France) DB Autosport by MB Performance		Ret					0
Pos.	Drivers	Team	(France) LEC	(France) MAG	(Italy) MUG	(Belgium) SPA	(Spain) NAV	(Portugal) ALG	Points

Key
Colour	Result
Gold	Winner
Silver	Second place
Bronze	Third place
Green	Other points position
Blue	Other classified position
Blue	Not classified, finished (NC)
Purple	Not classified, retired (Ret)
Red	Did not qualify (DNQ)
Red	Did not pre-qualify (DNPQ)
Black	Disqualified (DSQ)
White	Did not start (DNS)
White	Race cancelled (C)
Blank	Did not practice (DNP)
Blank	Excluded (EX)
Blank	Did not arrive (DNA)
Blank	Withdrawn (WD)
Blank	Did not enter (cell empty)
Text formatting	Meaning
**Bold**	Pole position
Italics	Fastest lap

† – Drivers did not finish the race, but were classified as they completed over 75% of the class winner's race distance.

== Hoosier Formula Cup ==
The Hoosier Formula Cup is open to Tatuus F3R T318 cars powered by either Alfa Romeo or Renault engines on 13-inch Hoosier tyres. Winfield Racing driver Stepan Suslov won the championship title with six races to spare and in doing so also became the Rookie Champion. Frédéric Boillot, driving for Race Motorsport, topped the Gentleman drivers' class.

=== Teams and drivers ===
Team	No.	Driver	Status	Rounds
(France) Formula Motorsport	2	(Switzerland) Walter Rykart	G	1
(France) Formula Motorsport	7	(France) Alexis Størksen	R	1–2
(France) Formula Motorsport	77	(Portugal) Alexandre Lima	G	2–3
(France) Race Motorsport	4	(France) Frédéric Boillot	G	1–5
(France) Race Motorsport	6	(France) William Chardin	R	3
(France) Race Motorsport	22	(Morocco) Diego El Glaoui		4
(France) Race Motorsport	23	(France) Lucas Valkre		1, 4
(France) Race Motorsport	25	(France) Michel Renavand	G	3
(France) Race Motorsport	66	(France) Laurent Fresnais	G	3
(France) Winfield Racing	10	(Australia) Craig McLatchey	G	1–5
(France) Winfield Racing	12	(Bulgaria) Martin Stoyanov	R	1, 4
(France) Winfield Racing	21	(Mexico) Alan Orzynski	R	1–5
(France) Winfield Racing	41	(Sweden) Stepan Suslov	R	1–5
(France) Tierce Racing	11	(France) Corentin Tierce		2
(France) Rever'Team	18	(France) Gilles Depierre	G	1–3, 5
(France) Krafft Racing	27	(France) Jimmy Luminier		5
(France) Plantier Racing Team	28	(France) Alexandre Botella	R	1–2
(France) Lamo Racing Car	33	(France) Thierry Malhomme	G	1
(France) Lamo Racing Car	66	(Luxembourg) Enzo Richer	R	2
(France) Team Chamberod Sport	46	(France) Nicolas Dumond		4
(France) KRT	49	(France) Frédéric Morihain	G	1
(Switzerland) Sports Promotion	62	(Switzerland) Christophe Hurni	G	4
(France) DBC Noveli by Race Motorsport	69	(France) Eros Gioannini	R	1–4
(Italy) TS Corse	TBA	(Peru) Daniella Oré	R	TBC

Icon	Legend
**R**	Rookie
**G**	Gentleman

=== Race results ===
Round		Circuit	Pole position	Fastest lap	Winning driver	Winning team	Rookie winner	Gentleman winner
1	R1	(France) Circuit Paul Ricard	(Sweden) Stepan Suslov	(France) Eros Gioannini	(Sweden) Stepan Suslov	(France) Winfield Racing	(Sweden) Stepan Suslov	(France) Frédéric Boillot
1	R2	(France) Circuit Paul Ricard	(Sweden) Stepan Suslov	(Bulgaria) Martin Stoyanov	(Sweden) Stepan Suslov	(France) Winfield Racing	(Sweden) Stepan Suslov	(France) Frédéric Boillot
1	R3	(France) Circuit Paul Ricard		(Sweden) Stepan Suslov	(Sweden) Stepan Suslov	(France) Winfield Racing	(Sweden) Stepan Suslov	(France) Frédéric Boillot
2	R1	(France) Circuit de Nevers Magny-Cours	(Sweden) Stepan Suslov	(Luxembourg) Enzo Richer	(Luxembourg) Enzo Richer	(France) Lamo Racing Car	(Luxembourg) Enzo Richer	(France) Frédéric Boillot
2	R2	(France) Circuit de Nevers Magny-Cours	(Sweden) Stepan Suslov	(Sweden) Stepan Suslov	(Sweden) Stepan Suslov	(France) Winfield Racing	(Sweden) Stepan Suslov	(France) Frédéric Boillot
2	R3	(France) Circuit de Nevers Magny-Cours		(Sweden) Stepan Suslov	(Sweden) Stepan Suslov	(France) Winfield Racing	(Sweden) Stepan Suslov	(France) Frédéric Boillot
3	R1	(Italy) Mugello Circuit	(Sweden) Stepan Suslov	(Sweden) Stepan Suslov	(Sweden) Stepan Suslov	(France) Winfield Racing	(Sweden) Stepan Suslov	(Portugal) Alexandre Lima
3	R2	(Italy) Mugello Circuit	(Sweden) Stepan Suslov	(Sweden) Stepan Suslov	(Sweden) Stepan Suslov	(France) Winfield Racing	(Sweden) Stepan Suslov	(France) Frédéric Boillot
3	R3	(Italy) Mugello Circuit		(France) Eros Gioannini	(Sweden) Stepan Suslov	(France) Winfield Racing	(Sweden) Stepan Suslov	(France) Frédéric Boillot
4	R1	(Belgium) Circuit de Spa-Francorchamps	(Sweden) Stepan Suslov	(Sweden) Stepan Suslov	(Sweden) Stepan Suslov	(France) Winfield Racing	(Sweden) Stepan Suslov	(Switzerland) Christophe Hurni
4	R2	(Belgium) Circuit de Spa-Francorchamps	(Sweden) Stepan Suslov	(Sweden) Stepan Suslov	(Sweden) Stepan Suslov	(France) Winfield Racing	(Sweden) Stepan Suslov	(Switzerland) Christophe Hurni
4	R3	(Belgium) Circuit de Spa-Francorchamps		(Sweden) Stepan Suslov	(Sweden) Stepan Suslov	(France) Winfield Racing	(Sweden) Stepan Suslov	(France) Frédéric Boillot
5	R1	(Spain) Circuito de Navarra	(Sweden) Stepan Suslov	(Sweden) Stepan Suslov	(Sweden) Stepan Suslov	(France) Winfield Racing	(Sweden) Stepan Suslov	(France) Frédéric Boillot
5	R2	(Spain) Circuito de Navarra	(Sweden) Stepan Suslov	(Sweden) Stepan Suslov	(Sweden) Stepan Suslov	(France) Winfield Racing	(Sweden) Stepan Suslov	(France) Frédéric Boillot
5	R3	(Spain) Circuito de Navarra		(Sweden) Stepan Suslov	(Sweden) Stepan Suslov	(France) Winfield Racing	(Sweden) Stepan Suslov	(France) Frédéric Boillot
6	R1	(Portugal) Algarve International Circuit						
6	R2	(Portugal) Algarve International Circuit						
6	R3	(Portugal) Algarve International Circuit						

=== Standings ===
==== Scoring system ====
Points are awarded to all finishers as follows:

Position	**1st**	**2nd**	**3rd**	**4th**	**5th**	**6th**	**7th**	**8th**	**9th**	**10th**	**11th+**
Points	25	18	15	12	10	8	6	4	2	1	0.5

- If a driver completed less than 75% percent, but more than 50% of the laps (rounded down) the driver classified first in their class completed, they are awarded half points.
- A driver not completing at least 50% of the distance of the driver classified first in their class does not score any points.
- Should the driver classified first in a class not complete at least 50% of the distance of the driver classified first overall, no driver in said class scores points towards the class standings.
- Should a driver be the only competitor in a class, they have to have completed at least 50% of the distance of the driver classified first overall to score any points towards said class.

==== Overall standings ====
Pos	Driver	LEC (France)			MAG (France)			MUG (Italy)			SPA (Belgium)			NAV (Spain)			POR (Portugal)			Pts
Pos	Driver	R1	R2	R3	R1	R2	R3	R1	R2	R3	R1	R2	R3	R1	R2	R3	R1	R2	R3	Pts
1	(Sweden) Stepan Suslov	**1**	**1**	1	**2**	**1**	1	**1**	**1**	1	**1**	**1**	1	**1**	**1**	1				368
2	(Mexico) Alan Orzynski	3	Ret	6	6	5	5	Ret	3	3	2	5	4	2	2	2				175
3	(France) Frédéric Boillot	6	5	5	7	6	6	4	4	4	5	7	5	3	3	3				157
4	(France) Eros Gioannini	5	6	Ret	5	Ret	DNS	2	2	2	Ret	3	2							115
5	(Bulgaria) Martin Stoyanov	2	2	2							9	2	3							89
6	(France) Alexis Størksen	4	3	3	4	3	3													84
7	(Australia) Craig McLatchey	Ret	Ret	9	8	Ret	7	5	10†	6	6	10	Ret	5	4	4				74
8	(France) Lucas Valkre	7	4	4							4	4	6							62
9	(France) Gilles Depierre	11	Ret	DNS	10	8	8	6	5	Ret				4	5	5				59.5
10	(France) Corentin Tierce				3	2	2													51
11	(Luxembourg) Enzo Richer				1	4	4													49
12	(Switzerland) Christophe Hurni										3	6	7							39
13	(Portugal) Alexandre Lima				9	7	10†	3	6	7										38
14	(France) Laurent Fresnais							DSQ	7	5										16
15	(Switzerland) Walter Rykart	8	7	7																16
16	(France) Alexandre Botella	9	8	8	11	9	9													14.5
17	(France) William Chardin							7	8	DSQ										10
18	(France) Nicolas Dumond										7	8	DNS							10
19	(Morocco) Diego El Glaoui										8	9	8							10
20	(France) Jimmy Luminier													6†*	DNS	DNS				4
21	(France) Thierry Malhomme	12†*	9	DSQ																2.5
22	(France) Michel Renavand							DNS	9	DSQ										2
23	(France) Frédéric Morihain	10	10†*	DNS																1.5
Pos	Driver	R1	R2	R3	R1	R2	R3	R1	R2	R3	R1	R2	R3	R1	R2	R3	R1	R2	R3	Pts
Pos	Driver	LEC (France)			MAG (France)			MUG (Italy)			SPA (Belgium)			NAV (Spain)			POR (Portugal)			Pts

Key
Colour	Result
Gold	Winner
Silver	Second place
Bronze	Third place
Green	Other points position
Blue	Other classified position
Blue	Not classified, finished (NC)
Purple	Not classified, retired (Ret)
Red	Did not qualify (DNQ)
Red	Did not pre-qualify (DNPQ)
Black	Disqualified (DSQ)
White	Did not start (DNS)
White	Race cancelled (C)
Blank	Did not practice (DNP)
Blank	Excluded (EX)
Blank	Did not arrive (DNA)
Blank	Withdrawn (WD)
Blank	Did not enter (cell empty)
Text formatting	Meaning
**Bold**	Pole position
Italics	Fastest lap

* - half points

==== Sub-class standings ====
Pos	Driver	LEC (France)			MAG (France)			MUG (Italy)			SPA (Belgium)			NAV (Spain)			POR (Portugal)			Pts
Pos	Driver	R1	R2	R3	R1	R2	R3	R1	R2	R3	R1	R2	R3	R1	R2	R3	R1	R2	R3	Pts
Rookie class standings
1	(Sweden) Stepan Suslov	1	1	1	2	1	1	1	1	1	1	1	1	1	1	1				368
2	(Mexico) Alan Orzynski	3	Ret	4	5	4	4	Ret	3	3	2	4	4	2	2	2				187
3	(France) Eros Gioannini	5	4	Ret	4	Ret	DNS	2	2	2	Ret	3	2							121
5	(Bulgaria) Martin Stoyanov	2	2	2							3	2	3							102
4	(France) Alexis Størksen	4	3	3	3	2	2													93
6	(France) Alexandre Botella	6	5	5	6	5	5													56
7	(Luxembourg) Enzo Richer				1	3	3													55
8	(France) William Chardin							3	4	DSQ										27
Gentleman drivers' standings
1	(France) Frédéric Boillot	1	1	1	1	1	1	2	1	1	2	2	1	1	1	1				354
2	(Australia) Craig McLatchey	Ret	Ret	3	2	Ret	2	3	6†	3	3	3	Ret	3	2	2				170
3	(France) Gilles Depierre	4	Ret	DNS	4	3	3	4	2	Ret				2	3	3				132
4	(Portugal) Alexandre Lima				3	2	4†	1	3	4										97
6	(Switzerland) Christophe Hurni										1	1	2							68
5	(Switzerland) Walter Rykart	2	2	2																54
7	(France) Laurent Fresnais							DSQ	4	2										30
8	(France) Frédéric Morihain	3	4†*	DNS																21
9	(France) Thierry Malhomme	5†*	3	DSQ																20
10	(France) Michel Renavand							DNS	5	DSQ										10
Pos	Driver	R1	R2	R3	R1	R2	R3	R1	R2	R3	R1	R2	R3	R1	R2	R3	R1	R2	R3	Pts
Pos	Driver	LEC (France)			MAG (France)			MUG (Italy)			SPA (Belgium)			NAV (Spain)			POR (Portugal)			Pts

== Winter series ==
=== Calendar ===
The Calendar of the Ultimate Winter Cup was announced at the launch of the winter series on 19 June 2025. The series will consist of two race weekends, held across the Iberian peninsula.

Round	Circuit	Date	Map of circuit locations
1	(Portugal) Algarve International Circuit, Portimão	13–15 February	2026 Ultimate Cup European Series is located in Iberia
2	(Spain) Circuito de Navarra, Los Arcos	20–22 March	2026 Ultimate Cup European Series is located in Iberia

=== Teams and drivers ===
Team	Chassis	Engine	No.	Drivers	Cl.	Rounds
NP02
(France) CD Sport	Nova Proto NP02	Ford Coyote 5.0 L V8	32	(France) Jérémy Clavaud		1
(France) CD Sport	Nova Proto NP02	Ford Coyote 5.0 L V8	32	(France) Nicolas Melin		2
(France) CD Sport	Nova Proto NP02	Ford Coyote 5.0 L V8	32	(Mexico) Max Mora		All
(France) ANS Motorsport	Nova Proto NP02	Ford Coyote 5.0 L V8	71	(France) Jean-Ludovic Foubert	AM	All
(France) ANS Motorsport	Nova Proto NP02	Ford Coyote 5.0 L V8	71	(France) Jacques Wolff	AM	All
(France) ANS Motorsport	Nova Proto NP02	Ford Coyote 5.0 L V8	73	(France) Frédéric Croullet		2
(France) ANS Motorsport	Nova Proto NP02	Ford Coyote 5.0 L V8	73	(France) Grégoire Croullet		2
(France) Cogemo Racing	Nova Proto NP02	Ford Coyote 5.0 L V8	88	(France) Nicolas Chartier		1
(France) Cogemo Racing	Nova Proto NP02	Ford Coyote 5.0 L V8	88	(Switzerland) Neel Jani		1
(France) Cogemo Racing	Nova Proto NP02	Ford Coyote 5.0 L V8	386	(Switzerland) Aubin Robert-Prince	AM	1
(France) Cogemo Racing	Nova Proto NP02	Ford Coyote 5.0 L V8	386	(Switzerland) Laurent Wuthrich	AM	1
(France) Cogemo Racing	Nova Proto NP02	Ford Coyote 5.0 L V8	555	(France) Antonin Bernard		1
(France) Cogemo Racing	Nova Proto NP02	Ford Coyote 5.0 L V8	555	(France) Erwin Creed		1
(France) Cogemo Racing	Nova Proto NP02	Ford Coyote 5.0 L V8	555	(France) Nicolas Prost		1
GT
(Italy) AF Corse	Ferrari 296 GT3	Ferrari F163CE 3.0 L Turbo V6	51	(Italy) Alessandro Cozzi		1
(Italy) AF Corse	Ferrari 296 GT3	Ferrari F163CE 3.0 L Turbo V6	51	(Italy) Nicola Mogavero		1
