= 1984 Mugello Grand Prix =

Race details
- Date: 19 May 1984
- Official name: 28th Mugello Grand Prix
- Location: Scarperia e San Piero, Tuscany, Italy
- Course: Mugello Circuit
- Course length: 5.245 km (3.259 miles)
- Distance: 42 laps, 220.290 km (136.878 miles)

Pole position
Driver	(Germany) Christian Danner	March-BMW
- Time: 1:39.45

Fastest lap
Driver	(New Zealand) Mike Thackwell	Ralt-Honda
- Time: 1:43.92

Podium
First	(New Zealand) Mike Thackwell	Ralt-Honda
Second	(France) Michel Ferté	Martini-BMW
Third	(Germany) Christian Danner	March-BMW

The 28th Gran Premio del Mugello (Mugello Grand Prix), was the fifth round of the 1984 European Championship for F2 Drivers, with the winner receiving the Trofeo Banca Toscana. This was held at the Autodromo Internazionale del Mugello, in the Tuscany Region of Italy, on 19 May.

== Report ==
=== Entry ===
Just like the previous round at Vallelunga, a total of 25 F2 cars were entered for the event, but come qualifying the field was down to just 17 cars.

=== Qualifying ===
Christian Danner took pole position for PMC Motorsport / BS Automotive in their March-BMW 842, averaging a speed of 117.976 mph.

=== Race ===
The race was held over 42 laps of the Mugello circuit. Mike Thackwell took the winner spoils for works Ralt team, driving their Ralt-Honda RH6. The Kiwi won in a time of 1hr 13:38.89mins., averaging a speed of 111.515 mph. Second place went to the Martini Racing, France/ORECA entered Martini-BMW 001 of Michel Ferté, who was exactly 80 seconds behind. The podium was completed by the PMC Motorsport / BS Automotive March of Christian Danner, was only 2.04 seconds adrift.

== Classification ==
=== Race result ===
Pos.	No.	Driver	Entrant	Car - Engine	Time, Laps	Reason Out
1st	1	(New Zealand) Mike Thackwell	Ralt Racing Ltd	Ralt-Honda RH6	1hr 13:38.89	
2nd	17	(France) Michel Ferté	Martini Racing, France/ORECA	Martini-BMW 001	1hr 14:58.89	
3rd	66	(Germany) Christian Danner	PMC Motorsport / BS Automotive	March-BMW 842	1hr 15:00.93	
4th	4	(Italy) Emanuele Pirro	Onyx Race Engineering	March-BMW 842	1hr 15:15.35	
5th	3	(Belgium) Thierry Tassin	Onyx Race Engineering	March-BMW 842	41	
6th	18	(Belgium) Didier Theys	Martini Racing, France/ORECA	Martini-BMW 002	41	
7th	5	(France) Pierre Petit	Onyx Race Engineering	March-BMW 842	41	
8th	15	(Italy) Guido Daccò	Sanremo Racing Srl	March-BMW 832	41	
9th	33	(France) Pascal Fabre	PMC Motorsport / BS Automotive	March-BMW 842	40	
10th	19	(Switzerland) Roland Minder	S.A.R.-Swiss Automobil Racing Club	March-BMW 832	40	
11th	6	(France) Philippe Streiff	AGS Elf (Armagnac Bigorre)	AGS-BMW JH19C	39	Engine
12th	9	(Italy) Roberto Del Castello	Minardi Team	Minardi-BMW M283	39	Mechanical
13th	21	(Italy) Stefano Livio	Merzario Team Srl	Merzario-BMW M84	39	
DNF	10	(Italy) Alessandro Nannini	Minardi Team	Minardi-BMW M283	32	Accident
DNF	44	(Sweden) Tomas Kaiser	PMC Motorsport / BS Automotive Ltd	March-BMW 842	26	Engine
DNF	8	(Austria) ”Pierre Chauvet”	Emco Sports	Spirit-BMW 201B	2	Engine
DNF	2	(Brazil) Roberto Moreno	Ralt Racing Ltd	Ralt-Honda RH6	0	Accident

- Fastest lap: Mike Thackwell, 1:43.92secs. (112.923 mph)
