= 2026 French GT4 Cup =

2026 Auto racing championship in France

The 2026 Championnat de France FFSA GT - GT4 France season was the 29th season of the French FFSA GT Championship and the ninth as the French GT4 Cup, a sports car championship created and organised by the SRO Motorsports Group. The season began on 3 April at Circuit Paul Armagnac and finished on 11 October at Circuit Paul Ricard. On May 19, 2026, at a SRO 24 Hours of Spa press conference, it was announced that the series joined the British GT grid at Circuit de Spa-Francorchamps for Spa Speedweek.

== Calendar ==
Round	Circuit	Date	Map of circuit locations
1	Circuit Paul Armagnac, Nogaro, France	3–6 April	2026 French GT4 Cup is located in France
2	Dijon-Prenois, Prenois, France	16–17 May	2026 French GT4 Cup is located in France
3	Circuit de Spa-Francorchamps, Stavelot, Belgium	20–21 June	2026 French GT4 Cup is located in France
4	Circuit de Nevers Magny-Cours, Magny-Cours, France	1–2 August	2026 French GT4 Cup is located in France
5	Circuit Paul Ricard, Le Castellet, France	10–11 October	2026 French GT4 Cup is located in France

== Entry list ==
Team	Car	No.	Drivers	Class	Rounds
(France) Chazel Technologie Course	Alpine A110 Cup	3	(France) Paul Alberto	AEC	1–3
(France) Chazel Technologie Course	Alpine A110 Cup	3	(Poland) Gosia Rdest	AEC	1–3
(France) Chazel Technologie Course	Alpine A110 Cup	9	(France) Julien Paget	AEC	1–3
(France) Chazel Technologie Course	Alpine A110 Cup	9	(France) Anthony Pisano	AEC	1–3
(France) Chazel Technologie Course	Alpine A110 Cup	22	(Hong Kong) Kwan Kit Lo	AEC	2
(France) Chazel Technologie Course	Alpine A110 Cup	22	(China) Zhou Yiran	AEC	2
(France) Chazel Technologie Course	Alpine A110 Cup	26	(France) Axel Constantin	INV	2
(France) Chazel Technologie Course	Alpine A110 Cup	26	(Netherlands) Johan Akkerman	AEC	3
(France) Chazel Technologie Course	Alpine A110 Cup	26	(France) Alexandre Lopez	AEC	3
(France) Chazel Technologie Course	Alpine A110 Cup	111	(France) Romain Monti	AEC	1–3
(France) Chazel Technologie Course	Alpine A110 Cup	111	(France) Rodolphe Wallgren	AEC	1–3
(France) Chazel Technologie Course	Alpine A110 Cup	123	(France) Frédéric de Brabant	AEC	1–3
(France) Chazel Technologie Course	Alpine A110 Cup	123	(France) Alexandre Lopez	AEC	1–2
(France) Chazel Technologie Course	Alpine A110 Cup	123	(France) Axel Constantin	AEC	3
(France) Chazel Technologie Course	Alpine A110 GT4+	110	(France) Laurent Hurgon	PA	1–3
(France) Chazel Technologie Course	Alpine A110 GT4+	110	(France) Lazare Lartigau	PA	1–3
(France) Race Cars Consulting	Alpine A110 GT4+	4	(France) Léo Jousset	PA	1–3
(France) Race Cars Consulting	Alpine A110 GT4+	4	(France) Rudy Servol	PA	1–3
(France) Race Cars Consulting	Alpine A110 Cup	33	(France) Paul Roques	AEC	1–2
(France) Race Cars Consulting	Alpine A110 Cup	33	(France) Anthony Fournier	AEC	1
(France) Race Cars Consulting	Alpine A110 Cup	33	(France) Veenesh Shunker	AEC	2
(Spain) Mirage Racing	Aston Martin Vantage AMR GT4 Evo	5	(France) David Levy	Am	1–3
(Spain) Mirage Racing	Aston Martin Vantage AMR GT4 Evo	5	(United Kingdom) Jodie Sloss	Am	1–3
(Spain) Mirage Racing	Toyota GR Supra GT4 Evo2	6	(France) Kevin Jimenez	PA	1–3
(Spain) Mirage Racing	Toyota GR Supra GT4 Evo2	6	(Luxembourg) Enzo Richer	PA	1–3
(Spain) Mirage Racing	Toyota GR Supra GT4 Evo2	8	(Republic of Ireland) Joshua Henry	PA	1–3
(Spain) Mirage Racing	Toyota GR Supra GT4 Evo2	8	(France) Roméo Leurs	PA	1–3
(Spain) Mirage Racing	Audi R8 LMS GT4 Evo	7	(United States) Simon Asselin	PA	3
(Spain) Mirage Racing	Audi R8 LMS GT4 Evo	7	(United States) Grant West	PA	3
(France) CMR	Ginetta G56 GTA	13	(France) Stephan Guerin	GTA	1–3
(France) CMR	Ginetta G56 GTA	13	(France) Victor Guerin	GTA	1–3
(France) CMR	Ginetta G56 GTA	30	(France) Emmanuel Reviriault	GTA	1–2
(France) CMR	Ginetta G56 GTA	30	(France) Charly Bourachot	GTA	1
(France) CMR	Ginetta G56 GTA	30	(France) Arthur Poulain	GTA	2
(France) CMR	Ginetta G56 GTA	30	(France) Aleksandr Burdo	GTA	3
(France) CMR	Ginetta G56 GTA	30	(France) Thierry Soave	GTA	3
(France) CMR	Ginetta G56 GTA	44	(France) Gillian Lay	GTA	2
(France) CMR	Ginetta G56 GTA	44	(Denmark) Mikkel Njor	GTA	2
(France) CMR	Ginetta G56 GTA	73	(France) Philippe Marie	GTA	1–3
(France) CMR	Ginetta G56 GTA	73	(France) Léo Poncel	GTA	1–3
(France) CMR	Ginetta G56 GTP8	62	(France) Charly Bourachot	INV	2
(France) CMR	Ginetta G56 GTP8	62	(United Kingdom) Mike Simpson	INV	2
(France) CMR	Alpine A110 GT4 Evo	63	(France) Stéphane Auriacombe	Am	1–3
(France) CMR	Alpine A110 GT4 Evo	63	(Belgium) Stéphane Lémeret	Am	1–3
(Spain) NM Racing Team	Mercedes-AMG GT4	15	(Spain) Lluc Ibáñez	INV	3
(Spain) NM Racing Team	Mercedes-AMG GT4	15	(United States) Alexandre Papadopulos	INV	3
(France) VS Compétition	Porsche 718 Cayman GT4 RS Clubsport	20	(France) Axel Van Straaten	PA	1–3
(France) VS Compétition	Porsche 718 Cayman GT4 RS Clubsport	20	(France) Remi Van Straaten	PA	1–3
(France) JSB Compétition	Porsche 718 Cayman GT4 RS Clubsport	24	(France) Julien Briché	Am	1–2
(France) JSB Compétition	Porsche 718 Cayman GT4 RS Clubsport	24	(France) Nicco Ferrarin	Am	1–2
(United Kingdom) Century Motorsport	BMW M4 GT4 Evo (G82)	24	(United Kingdom) Jack Collins	S	3
(United Kingdom) Century Motorsport	BMW M4 GT4 Evo (G82)	24	(United Kingdom) Branden Templeton	S	3
(France) Herrero Racing	Alpine A110 Cup	25	(France) David Barrere	AEC	1–3
(France) Herrero Racing	Alpine A110 Cup	25	(France) Matteo Herrero	AEC	1–3
(France) Saintéloc Racing	Audi R8 LMS GT4 Evo	27	(France) Maxime Blanchemain	PA	1–3
(France) Saintéloc Racing	Audi R8 LMS GT4 Evo	27	(France) Sébastien Rambaud	PA	1–3
(France) Schumacher GP	Alpine A110 Cup	31	(Luxembourg) Lenny Kieffer	AEC	1–3
(France) Schumacher GP	Alpine A110 Cup	31	(France) Jérôme Thiery	AEC	1
(France) Schumacher GP	Alpine A110 Cup	31	(France) Julien Neveu	AEC	2–3
(France) Schumacher GP	Alpine A110 GT4+	88	(France) Jérémy Corsin	PA	1–3
(France) Schumacher GP	Alpine A110 GT4+	88	(France) Lukas Papin	PA	1–3
(France) Schumacher GP	Alpine A110 GT4 Evo	138	(France) Vincent Beltoise	PA	1–3
(France) Schumacher GP	Alpine A110 GT4 Evo	138	(France) Yves Lemaitre	PA	1–3
(France) Code Racing Development	Alpine A110 GT4 Evo	36	(France) Mathias Cazaux	PA	1–3
(France) Code Racing Development	Alpine A110 GT4 Evo	36	(France) Pascal Huteau	PA	1–3
(France) Code Racing Development	Alpine A110 GT4 Evo	38	(France) Viny Beltramelli	PA	1–3
(France) Code Racing Development	Alpine A110 GT4 Evo	38	(Belgium) Fabian Duffieux	PA	1–3
(France) Code Racing Development	Alpine A110 Cup	37	(China) Tai Ji Liu	AEC	2
(France) Code Racing Development	Alpine A110 Cup	37	(China) Ze Shi Yuan Yang	AEC	2
(Austria) Razoon – more than racing	BMW M4 GT4 Evo (G82)	60	(Turkey) Önder Erdem	PA	3
(Austria) Razoon – more than racing	BMW M4 GT4 Evo (G82)	60	(Switzerland) Gustavo Xavier	PA	3
(France) Akkodis ASP Team	Toyota GR Supra GT4 Evo2	78	(France) Cindy Gudet	PA	1–3
(France) Akkodis ASP Team	Toyota GR Supra GT4 Evo2	78	(France) Joran Leneutre	PA	1–3
(France) Akkodis ASP Team	Toyota GR Supra GT4 Evo2	87	(France) Jérôme Andre	PA	1–3
(France) Akkodis ASP Team	Toyota GR Supra GT4 Evo2	87	(France) Thomas Drouet	PA	1–3
(France) Circuit Toys	Toyota GR Supra GT4 Evo2	900	(United Kingdom) Klaas Kooiker	PA	1–3
(France) Circuit Toys	Toyota GR Supra GT4 Evo2	900	(France) Hugo Poppe	PA	1–3
(France) Circuit Toys	Toyota GR Supra GT4 Evo2	901	(United Kingdom) Rhys Lloyd	PA	1–3
(France) Circuit Toys	Toyota GR Supra GT4 Evo2	901	(United Kingdom) Harri Reynolds	PA	1–3

Icon	Class
PA	Pro-Am Cup
Am	Am Cup
GTA	Ginetta GTA Cup
AEC	Alpine Elf Cup Series
INV	Invitational
	GT Academy Entrant

== Race results ==
Bold indicates overall winner.

Round		Circuit	Pole position	Pro-Am Winner	Am Winner	Ginetta GTA Winner	AECS Winner
1	R1	(France) Circuit Paul Armagnac	(France) No. 4 Race Cars Consulting	**(France) No. 4 Race Cars Consulting**	(France) No. 63 CMR	(France) No. 13 CMR	(France) No. 111 Chazel Technologie Course
1	R1	(France) Circuit Paul Armagnac	(France) Léo Jousset (France) Rudy Servol	**(France) Léo Jousset** **(France) Rudy Servol**	(France) Stéphane Auriacombe (Belgium) Stéphane Lémeret	(France) Stephan Guerin (France) Victor Guerin	(France) Romain Monti (France) Rodolphe Wallgren
1	R2	(France) Circuit Paul Armagnac	(France) No. 4 Race Cars Consulting	**(France) No. 110 Chazel Technologie Course**	(France) No. 63 CMR	(France) No. 73 CMR	(France) No. 111 Chazel Technologie Course
1	R2	(France) Circuit Paul Armagnac	(France) Léo Jousset (France) Rudy Servol	**(France) Laurent Hurgon** **(France) Lazare Lartigau**	(France) Stéphane Auriacombe (Belgium) Stéphane Lémeret	(France) Philippe Marie (France) Léo Poncel	(France) Romain Monti (France) Rodolphe Wallgren
2	R1	(France) Dijon-Prenois	(France) No. 88 Schumacher GP	**(France) No. 88 Schumacher GP**	(France) No. 24 JSB Compétition	(France) No. 73 CMR	(France) No. 31 Schumacher GP
2	R1	(France) Dijon-Prenois	(France) Jérémy Corsin (France) Lukas Papin	**(France) Jérémy Corsin** **(France) Lukas Papin**	(France) Julien Briché (France) Nicco Ferrarin	(France) Philippe Marie (France) Léo Poncel	(Luxembourg) Lenny Kieffer (France) Julien Neveu
2	R2	(France) Dijon-Prenois	(France) No. 4 Race Cars Consulting	**(France) No. 4 Race Cars Consulting**	(Spain) No. 5 Mirage Racing	(France) No. 44 CMR	(France) No. 111 Chazel Technologie Course
2	R2	(France) Dijon-Prenois	(France) Léo Jousset (France) Rudy Servol	**(France) Léo Jousset** **(France) Rudy Servol**	(France) David Levy (United Kingdom) Jodie Sloss	(France) Gillian Lay (Denmark) Mikkel Njor	(France) Romain Monti (France) Rodolphe Wallgren
3	R1	(Belgium) Circuit de Spa-Francorchamps	(France) No. 04 Race Cars Consulting	**(France) No. 04 Race Cars Consulting**	(France) No. 063 CMR	(France) No. 073 CMR	(France) No. 025 Herrero Racing
3	R1	(Belgium) Circuit de Spa-Francorchamps	(France) Léo Jousset (France) Rudy Servol	**(France) Léo Jousset** **(France) Rudy Servol**	(France) Stéphane Auriacombe (Belgium) Stéphane Lémeret	(France) Philippe Marie (France) Léo Poncel	(France) David Barrere (France) Matteo Herrero
4	R1	(France) Circuit de Nevers Magny-Cours	(France) No. 4 Race Cars Consulting	**(France) No. 4 Race Cars Consulting**	(Spain) No. 5 Mirage Racing	(France) No. 30 CMR	(France) No. 3 Chazel Technologie Course
4	R1	(France) Circuit de Nevers Magny-Cours	(France) Léo Jousset (France) Rudy Servol	**(France) Léo Jousset** **(France) Rudy Servol**	(France) David Levy (United Kingdom) Jodie Sloss	(France) Aleksandr Burdo (France) Emmanuel Reviriault	(France) Paul Alberto (Poland) Gosia Rdest
4	R2	(France) Circuit de Nevers Magny-Cours	(France) No. 4 Race Cars Consulting	**(France) No. 78 Akkodis ASP Team**	(France) No. 63 CMR	(France) No. 73 CMR	(France) No. 111 Chazel Technologie Course
4	R2	(France) Circuit de Nevers Magny-Cours	(France) Léo Jousset (France) Rudy Servol	**(France) Cindy Gudet** **(France) Joran Leneutre**	(France) Stéphane Auriacombe (Belgium) Stéphane Lémeret	(France) Philippe Marie (France) Léo Poncel	(France) Romain Monti (France) Rodolphe Wallgren
5	R1	(France) Circuit Paul Ricard					
5	R2	(France) Circuit Paul Ricard					

== Championship standings ==
=== Scoring system ===
1 hour races
Position	1st	2nd	3rd	4th	5th	6th	7th	8th	9th	10th	Pole
Points	25	18	15	12	10	8	6	4	2	1	1
2 hour races
Position	1st	2nd	3rd	4th	5th	6th	7th	8th	9th	10th	Pole
Points	33	24	19	15	12	9	6	4	2	1	1

=== Teams' championship ===
In the teams' championship only the highest-finishing car from each team scores points, other cars from the same team are ignored, so cars from other teams move up in points.

== See also ==
- 2026 British GT Championship
- 2026 GT4 European Series
- 2026 GT4 Italian Series
- 2026 GT4 America Series
- 2026 GT4 Australia Series
- 2026 SRO GT Cup
