= Circuito de Navarra =

Motor race track in Northern Spain

- Full Circuit (September 2024–present)
- Location: Los Arcos, Navarre, Spain
- Coordinates: 42°33′39.81″N 2°9′49.01″W
- FIA Grade: 2 (Note: Circuito de Navarra's Grade 2 licence was extended to March 2028, and the circuit layout length was still assumed as 3.933 km (2.444 mi) in the list.)
- Owner: MotorSport Vision (November 2022–present)
- Broke ground: 2009
- Opened: 19 June 2010; 16 years ago
- Major events: Current: Ultimate Cup (2022–2023, 2026); Former: Ferrari Challenge UK (2025); BSB (2024); World SBK (2021); 24H Series (2018); FFSA GT (2012, 2015); ETRC (2013–2014); FIA GT Series (2013); Blancpain Endurance Series (2011–2012); FIA GT1 (2010–2012); Superleague Formula (2010)
- Website: http://www.circuitodenavarra.com/

Full Circuit (September 2024–present)
- Length: 4.313 km (2.680 mi)
- Turns: 16
- Race lap record: 1:40.676 ( (Mexico) Sebastián Álvarez, Nova Proto NP02, 2026, NP02)

Medium Circuit (September 2024–present)
- Length: 2.693 km (1.673 mi)
- Turns: 11

Short Circuit (September 2024–present)
- Length: 1.391 km (0.864 mi)
- Turns: 5

Original Long Circuit with Realigned Turn 6 (March 2024–July 2024)
- Length: 3.904 km (2.426 mi)
- Turns: 15
- Race lap record: 1:36.896 ( (United Kingdom) Kyle Ryde, Yamaha YZF-R1, 2024, SBK)

Original Long Circuit (June 2010–January 2024)
- Length: 3.933 km (2.444 mi)
- Turns: 15
- Race lap record: 1:27.348 ( (Belgium) Frédéric Vervisch, Panoz DP09, 2010, SLF)

Original Medium Circuit (June 2010–July 2024)
- Length: 2.672 km (1.660 mi)
- Turns: 8

Original Short Circuit (June 2010–July 2024)
- Length: 1.332 km (0.828 mi)
- Turns: 5

Circuito de Navarra is a motorsport race track that opened in June 2010 near Los Arcos in the Navarre region of Northern Spain. It is a 4.313 km (2.680 mi) permanent road course that hosted the Superleague Formula series and the FIA GT1 World Championship.

== History ==
The circuit was inaugurated 19 June 2010 with the showing of the MotoGP Inmotec. Its first national test was held on 31 July.

On 2–4 May 2014, it was the location of the second weekend of Acceleration 2014, a series of festivals combining top class car and bike racing with music and entertainment.

In cycling, the circuit hosted the start of stage 16 of the 2017 Vuelta a España and stage 12 of the 2019 Vuelta a España.

In 2018, Navarra held the first of two Spanish rounds of the 24H Series, with the other round being held in Barcelona.

On 9 March 2021; it was announced that Navarra to host the World SBK round on the dates of 20–22 August 2021.

On 30 September 2022, it was announced that MSV won the bid for purchasing Circuito de Navarra from November 2022. As part of its agreement, MSV resurfaced the circuit and finalized the circuit's 2023 calendar programme along with maintaining the current management of this circuit. The circuit hosted official British Superbike Championship test session in March 2023, and it will host the first race of British Superbike Championship in April 2024.

On 29 January 2024, it was announced that the circuit would be renovated, resurfaced and extended in two phases. The first phase was done between January and March for resurfacing and realigning Turn 6, while the second phase was done between July and September to extend the circuit length to 4.313 km (2.680 mi).

== Layout history ==
Circuito de Navarra Layout History
Original Long Circuit (June 2010–January 2024)

Full Circuit (September 2024–present)

== Events ==
Current

- March: Ultimate Winter Cup
- May: Spanish Superbike Championship, Spanish Truck Championship
- September: Spanish Superbike Championship
- October: Ultimate Cup Series, TCR Spain Touring Car Championship, F4 Spanish Championship, GT-CER, GR Cup Spain, Copa Nacional Renault

Former

- 24H Series
  - 12H Navarra (2018)
- Acceleration 2014
  - Acceleration at Navarra (2014)
- Auto GP (2010)
- Blancpain Endurance Series (2011–2012)
- BMW F900R Cup (2024)
- British Superbike Championship (2024)
- British Supersport Championship (2024)
- British Talent Cup (2024)
- Eurocup-4 Spanish Winter Championship (2025)
- European Truck Racing Championship (2013–2014)
- Ferrari Challenge UK (2025)
- FFSA GT Championship (2012, 2015)
- FIA GT Series (2013)
- FIA GT1 World Championship (2010–2012)
- FIA GT3 European Championship (2011–2012)
- FIM CEV Moto2 European Championship (2012–2015)
- FIM CEV Moto3 Junior World Championship (2012–2015)
- Formula Winter Series (2023)
- French F4 Championship (2012, 2015)
- Lamborghini Super Trofeo Europe (2012)
- Porsche Carrera Cup France (2012, 2015)
- Superbike World Championship (2021)
- Supersport World Championship (2021)
- Superleague Formula
  - Superleague Formula round Spain (2010)
- V de V Challenge Endurance GT/Tourisme (2018)
- Vuelta a España (2017, 2019)

== Lap records ==
Joseph Loake holds the unofficial lap record, set in December 2024 during the GB3 testing with a Tatuus MSV GB3-025, with a time of 1:40.620. As of October 2026, the fastest official race lap records at the Circuito de Navarra are listed as:

Category	Time	Driver	Vehicle	Event
Full Circuit (September 2024–present): 4.313 km (2.680 mi)
NP02	1:40.676	Sebastián Álvarez	Nova Proto NP02	2026 Navarra European Endurance Prototype Cup round
Formula Regional	1:43.524	Stepan Suslov	Tatuus F3 T-318	2026 Navarra Hoosier Formula Cup round
Superbike	1:44.336	Ivo Lopes	BMW M1000RR	2026 2nd Navarra Spanish Superbike round
Porsche Carrera Cup	1:45.157	Benjamin Lessennes	Porsche 911 (992 I) GT3 Cup	2026 Navarra Ultimate Cup Endurance round
Ferrari Challenge	1:45.313	Gilbert Yates	Ferrari 296 Challenge	2025 Navarra Ferrari Challenge UK round
Formula 4	1:46.361	Thomas Strauven	Tatuus F4-T421	2025 Navarra Eurocup-4 Spanish Winter Championship round
SRO GT2	1:46.486	Daniel Carretero	Audi R8 LMS GT2	2025 Navarra Campeonato de España de Resistencia round
Supersport	1:46.508	Marcos Ludeña	Ducati Panigale V2	2026 2nd Navarra Spanish Supersport round
GT3	1:47.971	David Fevre	Lamborghini Huracán GT3	2026 Navarra Ultimate Cup GT Sprint Cup round
Sportbike	1:51.175	Alvaro Fuertes	Kawasaki Ninja ZX-6R 636	2026 2nd Navarra Spanish Sportbike round
GT4	1:52.592	Manuel Bertolín	BMW M4 GT4 Evo	2025 Navarra Campeonato de España de GT round
TCR Touring Car	1:54.119	Viktor Andersson	CUPRA León VZ TCR	2026 Navarra TCR Spain round
Sports car racing	1:56.641	Antonio Sainero	BMW M2 CS Racing	2024 Navarra Copa Racer round
Supersport 300	1:58.808	Miguel Bernal	Kawasaki Ninja 400	2025 2nd Navarra Spanish Supersport 300 round
F1 Historic	2:02.001	Tim Child	Brabham BT3	2024 Navarra Historic Festival
Renault Clio Cup	2:05.618	David Pouget	Renault Clio Cup V	2026 Navarra Clio Cup Series round
Toyota GR Cup	2:07.416	Marco Aguilera	Toyota GR86	2026 Navarra Toyota GR Cup Spain round
Truck racing	2:20.886	Jose Alberto Vila	MAN TFS	2026 Navarra CECC round
Original Long Circuit with Realigned Turn 6 (March 2024–July 2024): 3.904 km (2.426 mi)
Superbike	1:36.896	Kyle Ryde	Yamaha YZF-R1	2024 Navarra British Superbike round
Supersport	1:39.394	Luke Stapleford	Triumph Street Triple 765	2024 Navarra British Supersport round
Porsche Carrera Cup	1:39.445	Dieter Svepes	Porsche 911 (992 I) GT3 Cup	2024 Navarra GT-CET round
Ferrari Challenge	1:42.345	Álvaro Fontes	Ferrari 488 Challenge Evo	2024 Navarra GT-CET round
GT4	1:45.402	Francesc Gutiérrez	McLaren Artura GT4	2024 Navarra GT-CET round
BMW F900R Cup	1:47.036	Mason Johnson	BMW F900R	2024 Navarra BMW F900R Cup round
Moto3	1:49.157	Filip Surowiak	Honda NSF250R	2024 Navarra British Talent Cup round
Group 4	1:50.031	Christophe Gadais	Chevron B16	2024 V de V VHC Endurance 6 Hours of Navarra
TCR Touring Car	1:50.609	Joan Vinyes Jr.	CUPRA León TCR DSG	2024 Navarra GT-CET round
Renault Clio Cup	1:55.889	Álvaro Rodríguez Sastre	Renault Clio R.S. IV	2024 Navarra GT-CET round
Original Long Circuit (June 2010–January 2024): 3.933 km (2.444 mi)
Superleague Formula	1:27.348	Frédéric Vervisch	Panoz DP09	2010 Navarra Superleague Formula round
Auto GP	1:27.838	Edoardo Piscopo	Lola B05/52	2010 Navarra Auto GP round
FA1	1:29.805	Nigel Melker	Lola B05/52	2014 Navarra FA1 round
CN	1:34.770	Mathias Beche	Nova Proto 02	2023 Navarra Ultimate Cup round
LMP3	1:35.535	Hugo Rosati	Ligier JS P320	2023 Navarra Ultimate Cup round
GT1	1:37.027	Ricardo Zonta	Lamborghini Murciélago LP 670 R-SV	2010 Navarra FIA GT1 round
World SBK	1:37.065	Scott Redding	Ducati Panigale V4 R	2021 Navarra World SBK round
GT3	1:38.579	Emmanuel Collard	Mercedes-AMG GT3	2022 Navarra Ultimate Cup round
Formula 4	1:39.652	Guillem Pujeu	Tatuus F4-T014	2017 Navarra F4 Spain round
SRO GT2	1:40.921	Ronnie Bremer	KTM X-Bow GT2	2023 Navarra GT Winter Series round
Porsche Carrera Cup	1:41.029	Ola Nilsson	Porsche 911 (992 I) GT3 Cup	2023 Navarra GT Winter Series round
World SSP	1:41.196	Dominique Aegerter	Yamaha YZF-R6	2021 Navarra World SSP round
GT2	1:41.295	Álvaro Parente	Ferrari F430 GT2	2010 Navarra Spanish GT round
FIM CEV Moto2	1:41.470	Xavi Vierge	Tech3 Mistral 610	2015 Navarra FIM CEV Moto2 round
Ferrari Challenge	1:43.781	Danilo del Favero	Ferrari 488 Challenge Evo	2023 Navarra GT Winter Series round
Formula Renault 1.6	1:45.203	Gabriel Aubry	Signatech FR 1.6	2015 Navarra French F4 round
FIM CEV Moto3	1:45.236	Fabio Quartararo	Honda NSF250R	2014 Navarra FIM CEV Moto3 round
GT4	1:45.615	Jan Philipp Springob	Mercedes-AMG GT4	2023 Navarra GT Winter Series round
TCR Touring Car	1:47.310	Isidro Callejas	CUPRA León Competición TCR	2022 Navarra TCR Spain round
Pickup truck racing	1:50.263	Eoin Murray	MWV6 Pick Up	2014 Navarra MW-V6 Pickup Series round
Renault Clio Cup	1:56.774	Rafael Villanueva	Renault Clio R.S. IV	2015 Navarra Renault Clio Cup Spain round
