= Steyr Type VI =

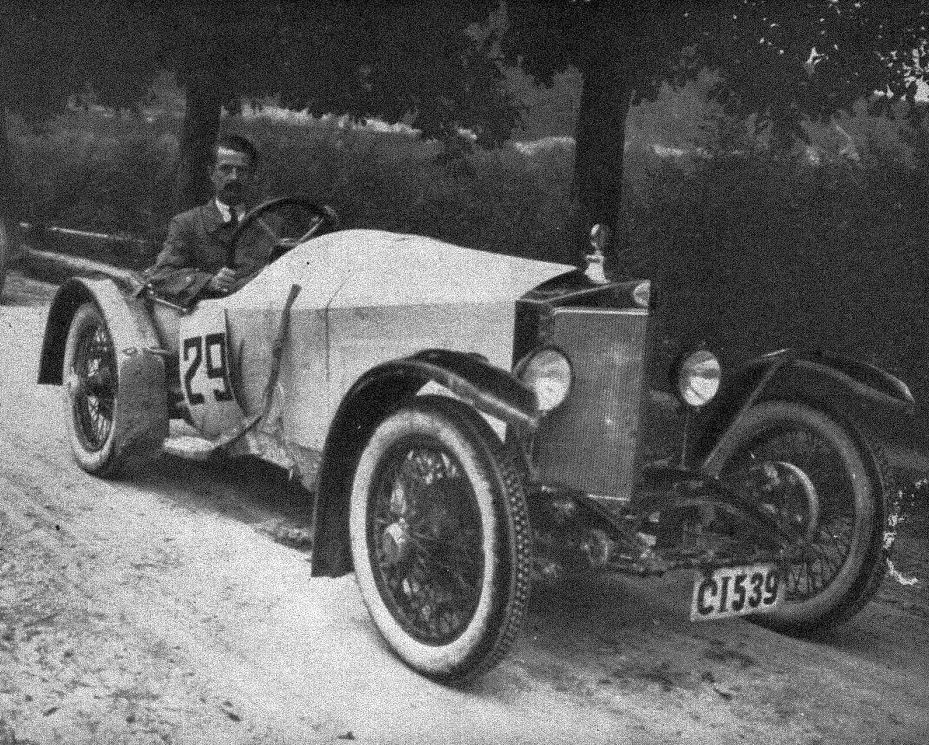

Overview
- Manufacturer: Steyr
- Production: 1923–1926

Body and chassis
- Class: Torpedo/Grand tourer
- Layout: FR layout

Powertrain
- Engine: 4.0–4.8 L (240–290 cu in) I6 12-valve SOHC; 99–145 hp (74–108 kW) @ 3000 rpm (naturally-aspirated)
- Transmission: 4-speed manual

Dimensions
- Wheelbase: 2,985–3,325 mm (118–131 in)
- Length: 4,000–4,480 mm (157–176 in)
- Width: 1,620–1,840 mm (64–72 in)
- Height: 1,410 mm (56 in)

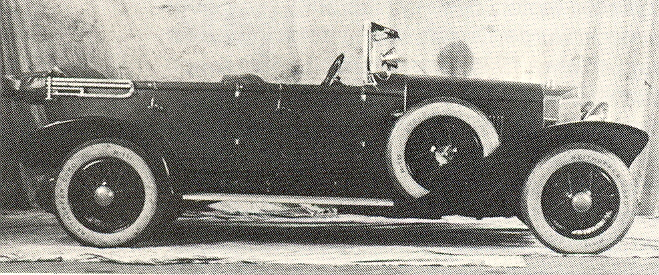
Steyr VI Sport Tourenwagen (1926)

The Steyr Type VI was a series of grand tourer-style torpedo car, designed, developed and built by Austrian manufacturer Steyr, between 1923 and 1926. A sports racing version, known as the VI Klausen, was used in both Formula Libre and Grand Prix racing events.
