= Mugello Circuit =

Motorsport venue in Italy

Autodromo Internazionale del Mugello
- Grand Prix Circuit (1974–present)
- Location: Scarperia e San Piero, Florence, Tuscany, Italy
- Coordinates: 43°59′51″N 11°22′19″E
- Capacity: 50,000
- FIA Grade: 1
- Owner: Ferrari (1988–present)
- Broke ground: 1973
- Opened: 23 June 1974; 52 years ago
- Major events: Current: Grand Prix motorcycle racing Italian motorcycle Grand Prix (1976, 1978, 1985, 1992, 1994–2019, 2021–present); San Marino motorcycle Grand Prix (1982, 1984, 1991, 1993); 24H Series; 12 Hours of Mugello (2014–2017, 2019–present); TCR Europe (2026); Former: Formula One; Tuscan Grand Prix (2020); Ferrari Challenge Finali Mondiali (1993–1996, 2000, 2003, 2005, 2007–2008, 2011, 2013, 2015, 2017, 2019, 2021, 2023, 2025); European Le Mans Series (2024); World SBK (1991–1992, 1994); FIM EWC (1978, 1982, 1991, 1995–1996); DTM (2007–2008); World Sportscar Championship (1965–1967, 1975–1982, 1985); FIA GT (1997, 2006)
- Website: http://www.mugellocircuit.it

Grand Prix Circuit (1974–present)
- Surface: Asphalt
- Length: 5.245 km (3.259 mi)
- Turns: 15
- Race lap record: 1:18.833 ( (United Kingdom) Lewis Hamilton, Mercedes W11, 2020, F1)

Road Course (1964–1970)
- Surface: Asphalt/Concrete
- Length: 66.2 km (41.1 mi)
- Turns: 400+
- Race lap record: 29:36.800 ( (Italy) Nanni Galli, Lola T210, 1970, Group 6)

Road Course (1955)
- Surface: Asphalt/Concrete
- Length: 19.0 km (11.8 mi)
- Race lap record: 10:41.000 ( (Italy) Giulio Cabianca (Italy) Umberto Maglioli, OSCA MT4; Ferrari 750 Monza, 1955, Sports car racing)

Road Course (1928–1929)
- Surface: Asphalt/Concrete
- Length: 61.895 km (38.460 mi)
- Race lap record: 49:58.800 ( (Italy) Giuseppe Campari, Alfa Romeo P2, 1928, GP)

Road Course (1925)
- Surface: Asphalt/Concrete
- Length: 18.17 km (11.29 mi)
- Race lap record: 14:13.600 ( (Italy) Emilio Materassi (Italy) Gastone Brilli-Peri, Itala Special 4.7; Alfa Romeo P2, 1925, GP)

Road Course (1920–1924)
- Surface: Asphalt/Concrete
- Length: 64.591 km (40.135 mi)
- Race lap record: 53:15.800 ( (Italy) Gastone Brilli-Peri, Steyr Type VI, 1924, GP)

Mugello Circuit (in Italian: Autodromo Internazionale del Mugello; in English: Mugello International Autodrome) is a motorsport race track in Scarperia e San Piero, Florence, Tuscany, Italy. The circuit length is 5.245 km (3.259 mi). It has 15 turns and a 1.141 km (0.709 mi) long straight. The circuit stadium stands have a capacity of 50,000.

The Italian motorcycle Grand Prix is held annually at the circuit (for MotoGP and smaller classes). Since 1988, the track has been owned and used by Scuderia Ferrari for Formula One testing.

The circuit hosted its first ever Formula One race on 13 September 2020, named the Tuscan Grand Prix, as part of the season being restructured due to the COVID-19 pandemic. This Grand Prix was the 1000th Grand Prix for Scuderia Ferrari.

== History ==
=== Road race (1920–1970) ===
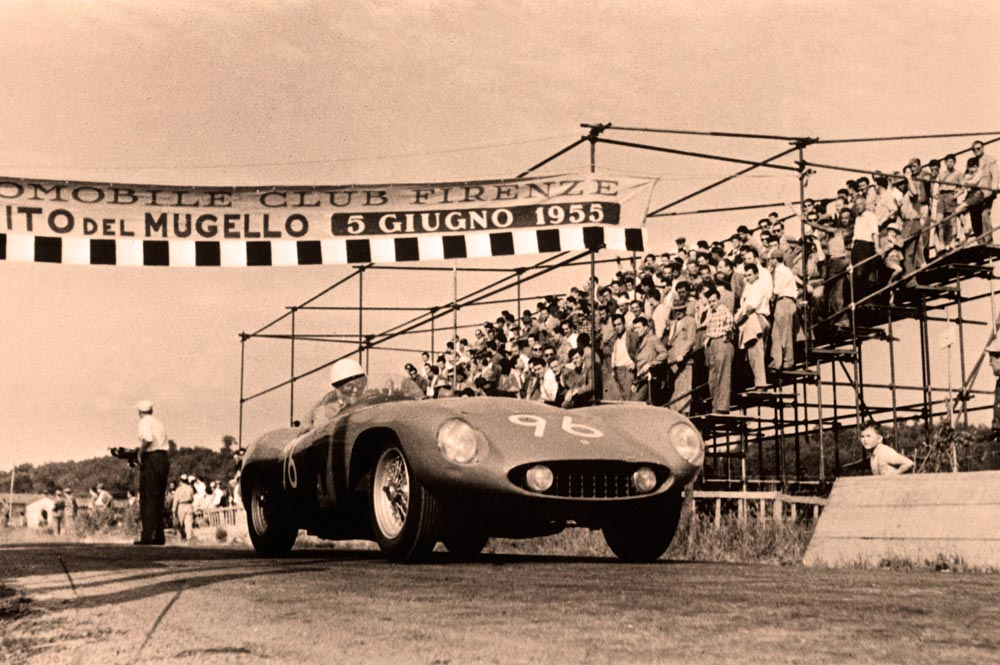
The start-finish line of historic road circuit (1955)

Road races were held on public streets around Mugello from the 1920s. The start was in the village of Scarperia, less than half a kilometer from the current permanent circuit. The circuit went north up the SP503, twisting and turning through mountains through multiple villages, up to the town of Firenzuola. The circuit then went west from Firenzuola, continuing on the SP503 towards the village of Pagliana. The circuit then made a left on the SR65, heading south through the villages of Covigliaio, Selva and Traversa, where the circuit got a bit faster. The circuit then went past a German military cemetery (from 1946 onwards) and entered the famous Futa Pass, which was used for the prestigious Mille Miglia. After this twisty section, the course stayed on the SR65 and went down multiple short straights and fast curves before getting to the villages of Le Maschere and Colle Barucci. The circuit then crossed a bridge going over a narrow section of the Bilancino Lake, going through an ultra fast left hand curve and 2 long straights before turning left onto the SP129, heading towards the town of San Piero a Sieve. The circuit then went north back onto the SP503, heading back to Scarperia to end the lap.

Giuseppe Campari won at Mugello in 1920 and 1921, and Emilio Materassi took victories in 1925, 1926 and 1928. The Mugello GP was revived in 1955 and from the 1964 to 1969 as a Targa Florio-like road race consisting of eight laps of 66.2 km (41.1 mi) each, including the Passo della Futa. The anticlockwise track passed the towns of San Piero a Sieve, Scarperia, Violla, Firenzuola, Sëlva, San Lucia. It counted towards the 1965, 1966 and 1967 World Sportscar Championship season. The last WC race was won by Udo Schütz and Gerhard Mitter in a Porsche 910. After two Porsche wins, 1968 saw the Alfa Romeo Tipo 33 of Luciano Bianchi, Nanni Galli and Nino Vaccarella prevail over the Porsche driven by Rico Steinemann and Jo Siffert. In 1969, Arturo Merzario won with an Abarth 2000, and he won again in 1970 with the same car, where Abarth finished 1–2–3 with Leo Kinnunen and Gijs van Lennep finishing second and third respectively.

The 1970 event brought about the end of the 66.2 km (41.1 mi) Mugello public road circuit; a seven-month-old baby was killed when Spartaco Dini crashed his Alfa Romeo GTA into a group of people in Firenzuola during a private test there, when the roads were open to the public (the roads were only closed on race day and for qualifying). Four other people, including two young children, were seriously injured. Although there had only been one previous fatality at the original Mugello circuit (that of Günther Klass in 1967), the incident badly damaged the event's reputation, and the 1970 race turned out to be the last one held on the public road circuit, which was won once again by Merzario. After the incident, Dini spent two months in prison, and after his time served he left Italy and did not return for many years.

=== Permanent circuit (1974–present) ===
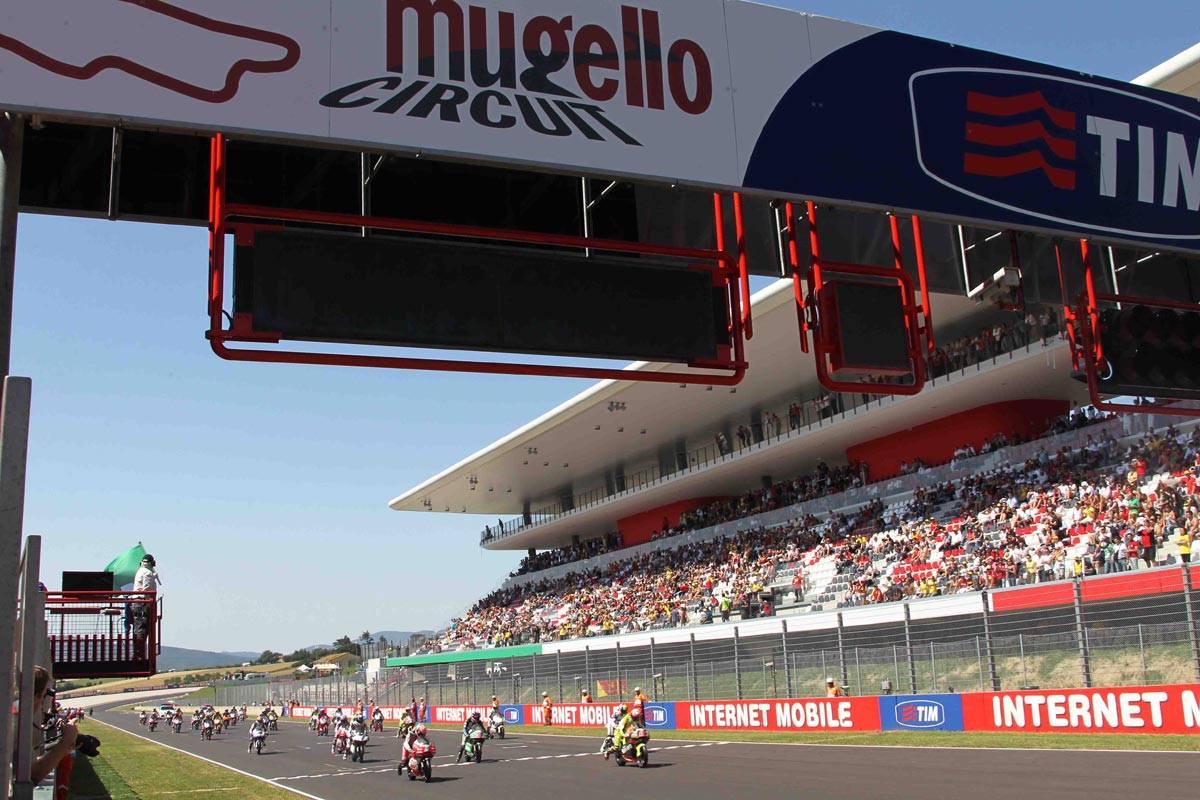
The main straight of permanent circuit (2011)

The present-day closed Mugello circuit was constructed in 1973 and opened in 1974, about 5 km (3.1 mi) east from the easternmost part of the original road circuit. Since 1988, the track has been owned by Scuderia Ferrari.

In 2007 and 2008 the Deutsche Tourenwagen Masters held an annual event. The first race of the A1GP 2008–09 season was originally planned to be held at the Mugello circuit on 21 September 2008. However, the race had to be cancelled due to the delay in building the new chassis for the new race cars.

The circuit was used for the in-season test during the 2012 Formula One season, by all teams except HRT. An unofficial track record of 1:21.035 was set by Romain Grosjean during the test. The track was praised by Mark Webber, who stated that he "did 10 dry laps today around Mugello, which is the same as doing 1000 laps around Abu Dhabi track in terms of satisfaction". Four-time Formula One world champion Sebastian Vettel said “unfortunately we don't have this track on the calendar. It's an incredible circuit with a lot of high-speed corners”. Vitaly Petrov was however critical of the decision to test at Mugello, claiming the circuit was "unsafe".

On 10 July 2020, it was announced that the 2020 Tuscan Grand Prix on the circuit would be the ninth race in the 2020 Formula One calendar, marking the 1000th Grand Prix for Ferrari.

At the 2021 Italian motorcycle Grand Prix, Moto3 rider Jason Dupasquier was killed in an accident. The 19 year old Swiss rider fell at Arrabbiata 2 on his final qualifying lap and was struck by the bikes of Jeremy Alcoba and Ayumu Sasaki. The latter two riders escaped without injury, but Dupasquier was immediately airlifted to Careggi hospital in Florence, with his condition described as “very serious”. He would undergo emergency thoracic surgery that evening, but died of his injuries the following day.

Mugello has the 3-star FIA Environmental Accreditation, and the ISO 9001, ISO 14001, ISO 45001, ISO 20121 and Eco-Management and Audit Scheme certifications. It was ranked the most sustainable racetrack in the world in a 2021 report.

On 26 September 2025, Romain Grosjean marked his return to Formula 1, driving a Haas VF-23 at Mugello, five years after the 2020 Bahrain Grand Prix accident. It was for an official Testing of Previous Cars (TPC) session.

== Events ==
Current

- March: 24H Series Michelin 12H Mugello, TCR Europe Touring Car Series, Prototype Cup Europe, Radical Cup Europe
- April: Ferrari Challenge Europe
- May: Grand Prix motorcycle racing Italian motorcycle Grand Prix, Red Bull MotoGP Rookies Cup, CIV Superbike Championship, Harley-Davidson Bagger World Cup
- July: Ultimate Cup Series, Italian GT Championship ACI Racing Weekend Mugello, Italian F4 Championship, TCR Italian Series, Italian Sport Prototypes Championship
- October: BOSS GP Gran Premio Storico d'Italia, Austria Formula Cup
- November: Italian GT Championship ACI Racing Weekend Mugello, Italian F4 Championship, TCR Italian Series, Porsche Carrera Cup Italia

Future

- E4 Championship (2023–2025, 2027)

Former

- 3000 Pro Series (2005)
- Alpine Elf Cup (2025)
- Auto GP (2000, 2005–2008, 2011, 2013)
- British Formula 3 International Series (2006)
- Classic Endurance Racing
  - Mugello Classic (2014, 2022–2024)
- Deutsche Tourenwagen Masters (2007–2008)
- Deutsche Tourenwagen Meisterschaft (1994)
- Euroformula Open Championship (2020, 2023)
- European Formula 5000 Championship (1974)
- European Formula Two Championship
  - Mugello Grand Prix (1974–1984)
- European Le Mans Series
  - 4 Hours of Mugello (2024)
- European Touring Car Championship (1976–1979, 1982–1984, 2000)
- EuroV8 Series (2014)
- Ferrari Challenge Finali Mondiali (1993–1996, 2000, 2003, 2005, 2007–2008, 2011, 2013, 2015, 2017, 2019, 2021, 2023, 2025)
- FIA European Formula 3 Championship (1980–1982, 1984)
- FIA Formula 2 Championship (2020)
- FIA Formula 3 Championship (2020)
- FIA GT Championship (1997, 2006)
- FIA GT3 European Championship (2006)
- FIM Endurance World Championship (1978, 1982, 1991, 1995–1996)
- Formula 3 Euro Series (2007–2008)
- Formula 750 (1979)
- Formula ACI/CSAI Abarth Italian Championship (2005–2013)
- Formula One
  - Tuscan Grand Prix (2020)
- Formula Palmer Audi (2006)
- Formula Regional European Championship (2019–2024)
- Formula Renault 2.0 Alps (2012–2014)
- Grand Prix motorcycle racing
  - San Marino motorcycle Grand Prix (1982, 1984, 1991, 1993)
- International Formula 3000
  - Mugello Grand Prix (1986, 1991, 1996–1997)
- International GTSprint Series (2011–2012)
- Italian Formula Renault Championship (2001–2002, 2005–2012)
- Italian Formula Three Championship (1974–1979, 1981–1988, 1991–2012)
- International Touring Car Championship (1995–1996)
- Le Mans Cup (2024)
- Ligier European Series (2024)
- MotoE World Championship
  - Italian eRace (2022–2024)
- Porsche Carrera Cup France (2013, 2024)
- Porsche Carrera Cup Germany (2008)
- SEAT León Eurocup (2016)
- Sidecar World Championship (1975–1976, 1981, 1983–1984)
- Superbike World Championship (1991–1992, 1994)
- Superstars Series (2004–2006, 2008–2012)
- TCR European Endurance Touring Car Series (2025)
- Trofeo Maserati (2003, 2006)
- V de V Sports (2010, 2013, 2015–2016)
- World Sportscar Championship (1965–1967, 1975–1982, 1985)

== Winners of the Mugello Grand Prix ==
The winners of the Mugello Grand Prix for cars (1919–1967: Circuito del Mugello, 1968–2000: Gran Premio del Mugello) are:

=== Winners on the closed circuit (5.245 km/3.259 mi) ===
Year	Driver	Constructor	Class	Report
2000	(Brazil) Ricardo Sperafico	Lola	Formula 3000	Report
1998–1999	Not held			
1997	(Brazil) Ricardo Zonta	Lola	Formula 3000	Report
1996	(Brazil) Ricardo Zonta	Lola	Formula 3000	Report
1992–1995	Not held			
1991	(Italy) Alessandro Zanardi	Reynard	Formula 3000	Report
1987–1990	Not held			
1986	(Italy) Pierluigi Martini	Ralt	Formula 3000	Report
1985	Not held			
1984	(New Zealand) Mike Thackwell	Ralt	Formula Two	Report
1983	(United Kingdom) Jonathan Palmer	Ralt	Formula Two	Report
1982	(Italy) Corrado Fabi	March	Formula Two	Report
1981	(Italy) Corrado Fabi	March	Formula Two	Report
1980	(United Kingdom) Brian Henton	Toleman	Formula Two	Report
1979	(United Kingdom) Brian Henton	March	Formula Two	Report
1978	(Republic of Ireland) Derek Daly	Chevron	Formula Two	Report
1977	(Italy) Bruno Giacomelli	March	Formula Two	Report
1976	(France) Jean-Pierre Jabouille	Elf	Formula Two	Report
1975	(Italy) Maurizio Flammini	March	Formula Two	Report
1974	(France) Patrick Depailler	March	Formula Two	Report

=== Winners on the road circuit (66.2 km/41.3 mi) ===
Note: The 1926 race was held on the Cascine circuit.

Year	Driver	Constructor	Class	Report
1970	(Italy) Arturo Merzario	Abarth	Sports car	Report
1969	(Italy) Arturo Merzario	Abarth	Sports car	Report
1968	(Belgium) Lucien Bianchi (Italy) Nino Vaccarella (Italy) Nanni Galli	Alfa Romeo	Sports car	Report
1967	(West Germany) Gerhard Mitter (West Germany) Udo Schütz	Porsche	Sports car	Report
1966	(West Germany) Gerhard Koch (West Germany) Jochen Neerpasch	Porsche	Sports car	Report
1965	(Italy) Mario Casoni (Italy) Antonio Nicodemi	Ferrari	Sports car	Report
1964	(Italy) Gianni Bulgari	Porsche	Sports car	Report
1956–1963	Not held			
1955	(Italy) Umberto Maglioli	Ferrari	Sports car	Report
1930–1954	Not held			
1929	(Italy) Gastone Brilli-Peri	Talbot	Grand Prix	Report
1928	(Italy) Emilio Materassi	Talbot	Formula Libre	Report
1927	Not held			
1926	(Italy) Emilio Materassi	Itala	Formula Libre	Report
1925	(Italy) Emilio Materassi	Itala	Formula Libre	Report
1924	(Italy) Giuseppe Morandi	OM	Formula Libre	Report
1923	(Italy) Gastone Brilli-Peri	Steyr	Formula Libre	Report
1922	(Italy) Alfieri Maserati	Isotta Fraschini	Formula Libre	Report
1921	(Italy) Giuseppe Campari	Alfa Romeo	Formula Libre	Report
1920	(Italy) Giuseppe Campari	Alfa Romeo	Formula Libre	Report

== Multiple winners ==
=== MotoGP ===
# Wins	Rider	Wins	
# Wins	Rider	Category	Years won
7	(Italy) Valentino Rossi	MotoGP	2002, 2003, 2004, 2005, 2006, 2007, 2008
6	(Spain) Jorge Lorenzo	MotoGP	2011, 2012, 2013, 2015, 2016, 2018
5	(Australia) Mick Doohan	500cc	1994, 1995, 1996, 1997, 1998
3	(Italy) Francesco Bagnaia	MotoGP	2022, 2023, 2024
2	(Spain) Marc Márquez	MotoGP	2014, 2025

=== Moto2 ===
# Wins	Rider	Wins	
# Wins	Rider	Category	Years won
3	(Italy) Max Biaggi	250cc	1995, 1996, 1997
2	(Italy) Luca Cadalora	250cc	1991, 1992
2	(Spain) Tito Rabat	Moto2	2014, 2015
2	(Spain) Pedro Acosta	Moto2	2022, 2023

=== Moto3 ===
# Wins	Rider	Wins	
# Wins	Rider	Category	Years won
3	(Italy) Roberto Locatelli	125cc	1999, 2000, 2004
2	(Japan) Noboru Ueda	125cc	1994, 2001

== Lap records ==
The official lap record for the current circuit layout is 1:18.833, set by Lewis Hamilton in the 2020 Tuscan Grand Prix. The unofficial all-time track record is 1:15.144; also set by Lewis Hamilton during final qualifying for the aforementioned race. As of July 2026, the fastest official race lap records at the Autodromo Internazionale del Mugello are listed as:

Category	Time	Driver	Vehicle	Event
Grand Prix Circuit (1974–present): 5.245 km (3.259 mi)
Formula One	1:18.833	(United Kingdom) Lewis Hamilton	Mercedes-AMG F1 W11 EQ Performance	2020 Tuscan Grand Prix
BOSS GP/Formula Renault 3.5	1:31.120	(Brazil) Antônio Pizzonia	Dallara T12	2023 Mugello BOSS GP round
FIA F2	1:33.295	(United Kingdom) Dan Ticktum	Dallara F2 2018	2020 Mugello Formula 2 round
LMP2	1:34.882	(Italy) Matteo Cairoli	Oreca 07	2024 4 Hours of Mugello
Auto GP	1:35.075	(Italy) Kevin Giovesi	Lola B05/52	2013 Mugello Auto GP round
BOSS GP/GP2	1:35.161	(Italy) Simone Colombo	Dallara GP2/11	2025 Mugello BOSS GP round
FIA F3	1:37.127	(Germany) Lirim Zendeli	Dallara F3 2019	2020 Mugello Formula 3 round
Euroformula Open	1:38.334	(Austria) Lukas Dunner	Dallara 320	2020 Mugello Euroformula Open round
Formula 3000	1:38.367	(Italy) Alessandro Zanardi	Reynard 91D	1991 Mugello Grand Prix
Group C	1:40.174	(Netherlands) Charles Zwolsman	Lola T92/10	1992 Mugello Interserie round
Formula Three	1:41.442	(Italy) Kevin Giovesi	Dallara F308	2011 Mugello Italian F3 round
Formula Regional	1:42.535	(Brazil) Gianluca Petecof	Tatuus F3 T-318	2020 Mugello FREC round
LMP3	1:42.776	(United Kingdom) Theo Micouris	Ligier JS P320	2026 Mugello Prototype Cup Europe round
NP02	1:43.834	(Chile) Nico Pino	Nova Proto NP02	2026 Mugello European Endurance Prototype Cup round
Formula Two	1:43.920	(New Zealand) Mike Thackwell	Ralt RH6/84	1984 Mugello Grand Prix
Group C2	1:44.347	(Italy) Ranieri Randaccio	Spice SE90C	1993 Mugello Interserie round
Group CN	1:44.807	(Italy) Matteo Roccadelli	Wolf GB08 Thunder	2021 Mugello CISP round
Formula Abarth	1:44.899	(Japan) Yoshitaka Kuroda	Tatuus FA010	2011 Mugello Formula Abarth round
GT1	1:45.013	(Germany) Bernd Schneider	Mercedes-Benz CLK GTR	1997 FIA GT Mugello 4 Hours
DTM	1:45.273	(United Kingdom) Jamie Green	AMG-Mercedes C-Klasse 2008	2008 Mugello DTM round
MotoGP	1:45.470	(Italy) Francesco Bagnaia	Ducati Desmosedici GP26	2026 Italian motorcycle Grand Prix
GT3	1:45.693	(Germany) Maro Engel	Mercedes-AMG GT3 Evo	2026 12 Hours of Mugello
Formula Renault 2.0	1:45.718	(Italy) Antonio Fuoco	Tatuus FR2.0/13	2013 Mugello Formula Renault 2.0 Alps round
Formula 4	1:47.236	(United States) Juan Manuel Correa	Tatuus F4-T014	2016 Mugello Italian F4 round
Group 6 sports car	1:47.880	(Italy) Teo Fabi	Lancia LC1	1982 1000 km of Mugello
Ferrari Challenge	1:48.600	(Switzerland) Felix Hirsiger	Ferrari 296 Challenge	2025 Mugello Ferrari Challenge Europe round
GT1 (GTS)	1:49.112	(Czech Republic) Jaroslav Janiš	Saleen S7-R	2006 FIA GT Mugello 500km
GT2	1:49.155	(Italy) Giacomo Barri	Ferrari F430 GTC	2011 Mugello GTSprint round
Moto2	1:49.497	(Spain) Iván Ortolá	Kalex Moto2	2026 Italian motorcycle Grand Prix
Class 1 Touring Cars	1:49.800	(Germany) Bernd Schneider	AMG-Mercedes Benz C-Klasse	1996 Mugello ITC round
Lamborghini Super Trofeo	1:49.943	(Italy) Luca Segù	Lamborghini Huracán Super Trofeo Evo2	2025 2nd Mugello Italian GT round
Porsche Carrera Cup	1:50.139	(Netherlands) Rik Breukers	Porsche 911 (992 I) GT3 Cup	2026 12 Hours of Mugello
Radical Cup	1:50.148	(United Kingdom) Marcus Littlewood	Radical SR3 XXR	2026 Mugello Radical Cup Europe round
Superbike	1:50.326	(Italy) Michele Pirro	Ducati Panigale V4 R	2019 1st Mugello CIV Superbike round
JS P4	1:50.853	(United Kingdom) Theo Micouris	Ligier JS P4	2024 Mugello Ligier European Series round
Sports 2000	1:52.630	(France) Gérard Larrousse	Alpine A441	1974 Mugello Grand Prix
500cc	1:53.342	(Australia) Mick Doohan	Honda NSR500	1998 Italian motorcycle Grand Prix
Supersport	1:53.564	(Germany) Philipp Öttl	Kawasaki Ninja ZX-6R	2021 1st Mugello CIV Supersport round
250cc	1:53.669	(Spain) Álvaro Bautista	Aprilia RSV 250	2008 Italian motorcycle Grand Prix
Group 5	1:53.800	(Italy) Riccardo Patrese	Lancia Beta Monte Carlo	1980 6 Hours of Mugello
GT2 (GTS)	1:54.563	(France) Philippe Gache	Chrysler Viper GTS-R	1997 FIA GT Mugello 4 Hours
Moto3	1:54.738	(Netherlands) Collin Veijer	Husqvarna FR250GP	2024 Italian motorcycle Grand Prix
Super Touring	1:55.261	(Italy) Fabrizio Giovanardi	Alfa Romeo 156 D2	1999 Mugello Italian Superturismo round
MotoE	1:55.617	(Italy) Alessandro Zaccone	Ducati V21L	2024 Italian motorcycle Grand Prix
TCR Touring Car	1:55.672	(United Kingdom) Alex Ley	Hyundai Elantra N TCR	2026 Mugello TCR Europe round
World SBK	1:56.305	(United States) Scott Russell	Kawasaki ZXR-750	1994 Mugello World SBK round
Group A	1:56.399	(Italy) Nicola Larini	Alfa Romeo 155 GTA	1992 Mugello Italian Superturismo round
Bagger World Cup	1:56.804	(Italy) Andrea Iannone	Harley-Davidson Road Glide	2026 Italian Harley-Davidson Bagger World Cup round
125cc	1:57.783	(France) Johann Zarco	Derbi RSA 125	2011 Italian motorcycle Grand Prix
GT4	1:57.799	(Germany) Nikolas Gebhardt	Porsche 718 Cayman GT4 RS Clubsport	2025 12 Hours of Mugello
Sportbike	1:58.169	(Italy) Bruno Ieraci	Triumph Daytona 660	2025 1st Mugello CIV Sportbike round
JS2 R	1:58.348	(France) Noé Da Cuhna	Ligier JS2 R	2024 Mugello Ligier European Series round
SEAT León Supercopa	1:59.218	(Spain) Mikel Azcona	SEAT León Cup Racer	2016 Mugello SEAT León Eurocup round
FIA GT Group 2	1:59.903	(Belgium) Bas Leinders	Gillet Vertigo Streiff	2006 FIA GT Mugello 500km
Alpine Elf Cup	2:00.361	(France) Léo Jousset	Alpine A110 Cup	2025 Mugello Alpine Elf Cup round
Supersport 300	2:04.835	(Spain) Oscar Nunez Roldan	Kawasaki Ninja 400	2023 2nd Mugello CIV Supersport 300 round
350cc	2:07.600	(Australia) Gregg Hansford	Kawasaki KR350	1978 Nations motorcycle Grand Prix
Group 2	2:07.800	(Austria) Dieter Quester	BMW 3.0 CSL	1977 Mugello ETCC round
Renault Clio Cup	2.08.305	(Italy) Matteo Poloni	Renault Clio R.S. IV	2019 Mugello Renault Clio Cup Italy round
Formula 5000	2:11.400	(United Kingdom) David Hobbs	Lola T330	1974 Mugello F5000 round
Sidecar (B2A)	2:14.700	(Switzerland) Rolf Biland	Beo-Yamaha	1978 Nations motorcycle Grand Prix
Formula Palmer Audi	2:17.086	(United Kingdom) Jon Barnes	Formula Palmer Audi car	2006 Mugello Formula Palmer Audi round
50cc	2:28.000	(Switzerland) Stefan Dörflinger	Kreidler 50 GP	1978 Nations motorcycle Grand Prix
Road Course (1964–1970): 66.200 km (41.135 mi)
Group 6	29:36.800	(Italy) Nanni Galli	Lola T210	1970 Mugello Grand Prix
Group 4	31:02.700	(Italy) Arturo Merzario	Abarth 2000 SP	1969 Mugello Grand Prix
Group 3	35:53.100	(Italy) Antonio Nicodemi	Ferrari 250 LM	1965 Mugello Grand Prix
Road Course (1955): 19.000 km (11.806 mi)
Sports car racing	10:41.000	(Italy) Giulio Cabianca (Note: Both drivers took the same lap time independently.) (Italy) Umberto Maglioli	OSCA MT4; Ferrari 750 Monza	1955 Mugello Grand Prix
Road Course (1928–1929): 61.895 km (38.460 mi)
Grand Prix	49:58.800	(Italy) Giuseppe Campari	Alfa Romeo P2	1928 Mugello Grand Prix
Road Course (1925): 18.169 km (11.290 mi)
Grand Prix	14:13.600	(Italy) Emilio Materassi (Note: Both drivers took the same lap time independently.) (Italy) Gastone Brilli-Peri	Itala Special 4.7; Alfa Romeo P2	1925 Mugello Grand Prix
Road Course (1920–1924): 64.591 km (40.135 mi)
Grand Prix	53:15.800	(Italy) Gastone Brilli-Peri	Steyr Type VI	1924 Mugello Grand Prix

== See also ==
- List of motor racing tracks
