= Los Arcos =

Coordinates: 42°34′00″N 2°10′59″W

- Interactive map of Los Arcos
- Country: Spain

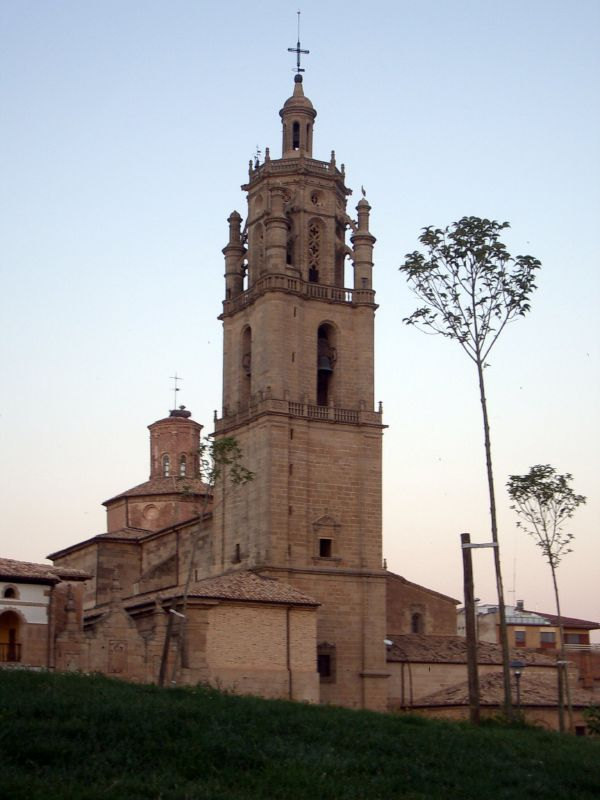
Church of Santa Maria

Los Arcos's flag

Los Arcos's coat of arms

Los Arcos is a town and Spanish municipality, in the Chartered Community of Navarre, situated in the administrative division of Estella, in the region of East Estella and is 62 km from the capital of the community, Pamplona. Its population in 2013 was 1182 inhabitants (INE). (Arkoeta in euskera)

== Economy ==
The workforce mainly lives of agriculture, although workers are very much divided between the primary and secondary sectors:

- 35% Primary sector

- 40% Secondary sector

- 25% Commerce and services sectors.

Agriculture is the main dedication of its inhabitants. It presents typical Mediterranean characteristics, such as vine and olive cultivation. Both wheat and barley and vine are cultivated both in rainfed and irrigated. Barley occupies the largest plowed extensions.

Other industrial representations developed are the textile industry, poultry and pig food farms and wood industry.

== Festivities ==
- Patron saint festivities: These are celebrated from the 14th to the 20th of August and among the various events and celebrations the ones that stand out are the bull runs and bullrings, the first bull run commencing on August 15 at 18:00. There are also popular two nocturnal bullring events celebrated in different days form 00:30 to 01:30.
