= Ultimate Cup Series =

Auto racing series in France

Ultimate Cup European Series
- Category: Formula racing Grand tourer Touring cars Endurance racing
- Country: Europe (3 races are held in France and 3 in other European countries)
- Inaugural season: 2019
- Official website: https://ultimatecupseries.eu/

The Ultimate Cup Series is an auto racing series formed in 2019. This endurance championship mainly takes place in France, with rounds elsewhere in Europe.

The Ultimate Cup Series is a program comprising multiple endurance and sprint championships across different classes of motor racing.

== History ==
The Ultimate Cup Series was set up at the end of 2018 by promoter Vincent Vigier. During the press conference in Paris, Vigier announced the main partners including Michelin and Oreca. In 2021, the championship received support from Peugeot Sport.

== Classes ==
Up till the 2024 season, the European Endurance Prototype Cup was open to LMP3, Nova Proto NP02s and Group CN cars. Starting in 2025, the Prototype Cup will only be open to Nova Proto NP02 cars, a significant change compared to prior years. A separate Bronze Cup for drivers with an FIA Bronze rating will also be newly introduced.

The LMP3 cars previously racing in the European Endurance Prototype Cup are scheduled to be placed in their own category in 2025, currently known under the pseudonym "Project 2025". These plans would see drivers compete in three separate classes based on their FIA ratings: the Pro Cup for Platinum- and Gold-rated drivers, the Silver Cup for Silver-rated drivers and the Bronze Cup for Bronze-rated drivers.

The Ultimate GT Endurance Cup is open to GT3, GT4, single-make series (Porsche Carrera Cup, Ferrari Challenge, Lamborghini Super Trofeo), TCR cars. The Ultimate GT-Sprint Cup was open to GT3, GT4, single-make series (Porsche Carrera Cup, Ferrari Challenge, Lamborghini Super Trofeo), TCR cars.

The Ultimate Formula Cup is open to Tatuus FR-19 cars in the F3R class, Tatuus FR2.0/13s in the FR2.0 class and Mygale M14-F4 and Tatuus F4 cars in the F4 class. An extra class was introduced to separate between entries in the F3R class using 13-inch or 17-inch tyres.

== Circuits ==
- (Portugal) Algarve International Circuit (2024–present)
- Automotodróm Slovakia Ring (2019)
- (France) Bugatti Circuit (2021)
- (France) Circuit de Dijon-Prenois (2019–2021)
- (France) Circuit de Nevers Magny-Cours (2019–present)
- (France) Circuit Paul Ricard (2019–present)
- (Spain) Circuit Ricardo Tormo (2019)
- (Spain) Circuito de Navarra (2022–2023, 2026)
- (Portugal) Circuito do Estoril (2019, 2021, 2023)
- (Germany) Hockenheimring (2022–2024)
- (Italy) Misano World Circuit (2022, 2027)
- (Spain) MotorLand Aragón (2025)
- (Italy) Mugello Circuit (2019, 2024–present)

== Champions ==
Season	Category / Cup (Class)	Drivers' Champion	Teams' Champion	Car / Model	References
2025	European Endurance Prototype Cup (NP02)	(France) Romain Carton	(France) DB Autosport	Nova Proto NP02	
2025	European Sprint Prototype Cup (LMP3 Pro-Am)	(United Kingdom) Ewan Thomas	(Czech Republic) Bretton Racing	Ligier JS P320	
2025	European Sprint Prototype Cup (LMP3 Am)	(Slovakia) Miroslav Konôpka	(Slovakia) ARC Bratislava	Ligier JS P320	
2025	Hoosier Formula Cup (F3R Overall / Rookie)	(Argentina) Nano López	(Italy) TS Corse	Tatuus F3R	
2025	Hoosier Formula Cup (Gentleman)	(Switzerland) Laurent Wuthrich	(France) Formula Motorsport	Tatuus F3R	
2025	Ultimate GT Sprint Cup	(United Kingdom) Lyle Schofield	N/A	Various	
2024	European Endurance Prototype Cup (Overall)	(Switzerland) Axel Gnos (Greece) Georgios Kolovos	(Poland) Team Virage	Ligier JS P320	
2024	European Endurance Prototype Cup (NP02)	(France) Eric Trouillet (France) Luis Sanjuan	(France) Graff Racing	Nova Proto NP02	
2023	Endurance Prototype Challenge (LMP3 Overall)	(United Kingdom) George King (Portugal) Manuel Espírito Santo	(Poland) Team Virage	Ligier JS P320	
2023	Endurance Prototype Challenge (NP02)	(Switzerland) Nicolas Maulini (France) Jacques Wolff	(France) Racing Spirit of Léman	Nova Proto NP02	
2023	Endurance GT Touring Challenge (Class 3A)	(France) Jean-Bernard Bouvet (France) David Hallyday (France) Jean-Paul Pagny	(France) Visiom	Ferrari 488 / 296 GT3	
2023	Sprint GT Touring Challenge (UGT3B)	(Italy) Francesco Atzori	(Italy) SR&R	Ferrari 488 GT3	
2023	Ultimate Formula Cup	(France) Paul Trojani	(France) Chazel Technologie Course	Tatuus FR19 / F4	
2022	Coupe Kennol GT Endurance (Class 3A)	(France) Emmanuel Collard (France) Charles-Henri Samani	(France) Racetivity	Mercedes-AMG GT3	
2022	Endurance Proto Challenge (LMP3)	(France) Nicolas Prost	(France) CMR	Ligier JS P320	
2022	Ultimate Formula Cup (Single-seater)	(Switzerland) Christophe Hurni	(Switzerland) Sports-Promotion	Tatuus F3R	
2021	Challenge Proto (LMP3)	(France) Mathis Poulet	(Poland) Team Virage	Ligier JS P320	
2021	Challenge GT Endurance	(France) Jean-Bernard Bouvet (France) Thierry Perrier (France) Jean-Paul Pagny	(France) Visiom	Ferrari 488 GT3 EVO	
2021	Challenge Monoplace	(France) Nicolas Prost	(France) CMR	Tatuus F3R	
2020	Challenge Proto (LMP3)	(Romania) Petru Florescu	(Poland) Team Virage	Ligier JS P320	
2020	Challenge GT Endurance	(France) Jean-Bernard Bouvet (France) Jean-Paul Pagny	(France) Visiom	Ferrari 488 GT3	
2020	Challenge Monoplace	(Switzerland) Konstantin Lachenauer	(France) Graff Racing	Tatuus F3R	
2019	Challenge Proto (LMP3)	(France) Vincent Capillaire (Austria) Matthias Kaiser	(Austria) Wimmer Werk Motorsport	Ligier JS P3	
2019	Challenge GT (UGT3)	(France) Jean-Paul Pagny (France) Thierry Perrier	(France) Visiom	Ferrari 488 GT3	
2019	Challenge Monoplace	(Belgium) Amaury Bonduel	(France) LAMO Racing Car	Tatuus FR 2.0 / F3	
