= Nova NP02 =

French Sports Prototype

- Constructor: Nova Proto
- Production: 2021

Technical specifications
- Chassis: Carbon fiber monocoque
- Length: 4,730 mm (186.1 in)
- Width: 1,910 mm (75.3 in)
- Height: 1,070 mm (42.3 in)
- Engine: Ford Coyote 5.0 L; 305.1 cu in (5,000 cc) V8 N/A mid-mounted
- Transmission: Sadev SLR90 6-speed sequential
- Power: 460 hp (466 PS; 343 kW)
- Weight: 890 kg (1,962.1 lb)
- Brakes: AP 6 pistons with 14” rotors
- Tyres: Michelin

Competition history
- Notable entrants: (Switzerland) Graff Racing (France) Racing Spirit of Léman
- Debut: 2022 Ultimate Cup Series Navarra round
- First win: 2022 Ultimate Cup Series Hockenheim round
Races	Wins	Podiums	Poles
21	7	28	6

The Nova NP02 is a sports prototype race car designed and built by French manufacturer Nova Proto. Nova Proto, founded by Guillem Roux and Camille Gautré Santos, has previously provided maintenance and spare parts for several Norma cars including the M20, M20-F and M20-FC.

The car competes in the Ultimate Cup European Series and the 24H Series. It will also be eligible in a new series, International Sports Cars (ISC).
