= Aleksey Chuklin =

Russian racing driver

- Nationality: (Ukraine) Ukrainian (Russia) Russian
- Born: Aleksey Yuryevich Chuklin; 11 August 1985 (age 41) Barnaul, Soviet Union

European Le Mans Series career
- Debut season: 2018
- Current team: NEFIS By Speed Factory
- Categorisation: FIA Bronze
- Car number: 5
- Starts: –

Previous series
- 2013, 2015, 2017 2013–2018 2012 2011–2012 2011–2012 2011, 2015, 2016: European F3 Open; EU F3 Open Winter; FR 2.0 Alps; FR 2.0 NEC; Eurocup FR 2.0; Championnat VdeV

Aleksey Yuryevich Chuklin (Russian: Алексе́й Юрьевич Чу́клин, IPA: [ɐlʲɪkˈsʲej ˈtɕuklʲɪn]; born 11 August 1985) is a Russian racing driver, since 2015 competing under Ukrainian racing license while living in Kyiv.

Chuklin started his car racing career in the Formula Renault 2.0 NEC, and has also competed in the Eurocup Formula Renault 2.0, the Championnat VdeV, the Formula Renault 2.0 Alps, and the European F3 Open. In 2016, Chuklin finished 3rd in the Championnat VdeV with MP Motorsport. In 2018, he joined NEFIS By Speed Factory team to compete in the European Le Mans Series.

== Career ==
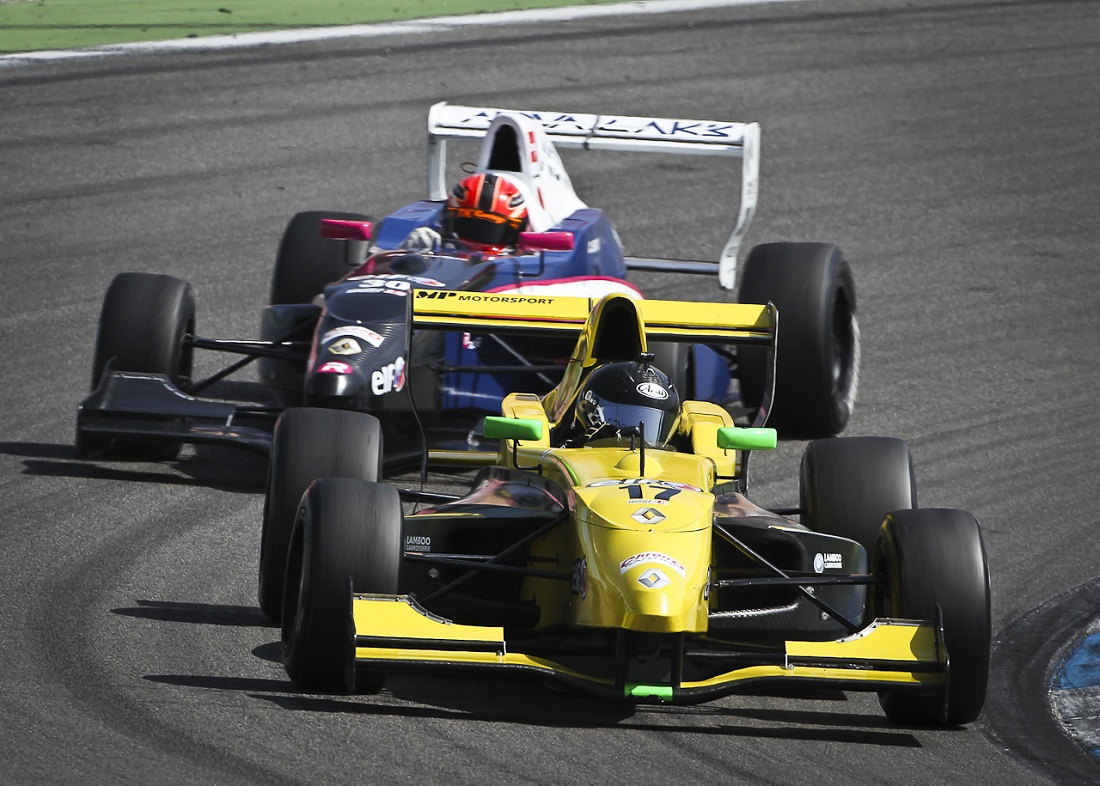
Chuklin on his Formula Renault 2.0 NEC debut

Chuklin, from Barnaul, had a brief Rotax Max karting career in Russia before moving to car racing. He spent several months in England and Western Europe testing the Formula Renault 2.0 Tatuus car.

In December 2010, Chuklin tested for the MP Motorsport team in a FR 2.0 Caparo car. For 2011, he signed with MP Motorsport for the complete season in Formula Renault 2.0 Northern European Cup as well as several rounds in Eurocup Formula Renault 2.0 series. He made his racing debut for the team in the opening round of the Formula Renault NEC, which was held at Hockenheimring, and finished twelfth in the first race, retired from the second, and eighteenth in the third. Having entered the next two rounds of the Formula Renault NEC, with his best finish being twelfth in the second race at Spa-Francorchamps, Chuklin raced in the Aragon of the Championnat VdeV, taking three poles, and two race victories; also setting the fastest lap in all three races. He then returned to the Formula Renault NEC, and took his first top-ten finish in the series in August, in the second race held at Circuit Zandvoort. Following that race, he entered the Silverstone round of the Eurocup Formula Renault, finishing 24th in race one, and 32nd in race two. Chuklin then returned to the Formula Renault NEC, finishing the remaining races, and took his best result of the season in the penultimate round at Monza; a sixth place. He ended the season having entered the final race of the Eurocup Formula Renault season, held at Barcelona; finishing 23rd in race one, and 27th in race two. He was classified 13th in the Formula Renault NEC, with 113 points, and 22nd in the Championnat VdeV, with 104 points after the one race weekend competing.

In 2012, Chuklin remained in the Formula Renault NEC with MP Motorsport. The team had joined up with Manor Motorsport, and were competing under the "MP Manor Motorsport" name. The season did not start successfully; Chuklin retired from four of his first six races, with his best finish in that time being twentieth in the third race at Hockenheim. After finishing 16th in the second race at Oschersleben, and retiring from the third, he entered the Moscow round of the Formula Renault Eurocup with Fortec Motorsports; he finished 28th in the first race, and 23rd in the second. Chuklin returned to the Formula Renault NEC at the Red Bull Ring round of the series, finishing 25th in the first race, and retiring from the second. The following round, held at Autodrom Most, saw Chuklin take his only top-ten finish of the season; he finished tenth in the second race. Following that event, Chuklin had a viza issues and could not compete in the Formula Renault NEC for the rest of the season. Chuklin switched to the Formula Renault 2.0 Alps for its season finale, held at Barcelona; Chuklin was entered by Team Torino Motorsport. He retired from the first race, and finished 22nd in race two. He was classified 34th in the Formula Renault NEC, with 23 points.

After successful testing before the season-2013, it was announced that Chuklin would be entering the European F3 Open Championship with Emilio de Villota Motorsport. He made his first appearances for the team in the European F3 Open Winter Series. Being fourth in his first qualifying in Formula 3, Chuklin had to retire from the first race at Paul Ricard after the crash with Alexandre Cougnaud. Chuklin finished third in the second race of European F3 Open Winter Series, held at Jerez. His pace was close to top three during all three rounds of European F3 Open Winter Series. After successful European F3 Open Winter Series and being the fastest driver of Emilio de Villota Motorsport in all testing sessions at Barcelona, Chuklin was looking forward for a successful season. On his debut in the European F3 Open series, which came in the opening round of the season, held at Paul Ricard, he finished fifth in race one, and 23rd in race two. Chuklin was hoping to have a better season after a tough start. Having taken a sixth in the first race at Portimao, he did not finish above 20th for five races. Chuklin was in top ten after the first qualifying session at Jerez. Then he took a ninth in the first race at Silverstone, and a sixth in the second. Chuklin's pace at the end of 2013 was around 20th. However, from time to time he was in top ten. Chuklin finished the season in eleventh overall, with 28 points.

Before the start of the 2014 season, Chuklin was considering to miss the season due to the lack of sponsorship. However, he had some tests in the European F3 Open Winter Series in March. At the end of October, Chuklin tested Tatuus F4-T014 car with the team Israel F4, in collaboration with Team Torino Motorsport at Adria International Raceway during Italian F4 Winter Trophy. In November 2014, he took part in the 6 Hours of Vallelunga. Chuklin drove Wolf GB08 for Avelon Formula along with Ivan Bellarosa and Luca Pirri Ardizzone. They started from the pole position but had to retire due to engine failure before the stint of Chuklin. It was his first time in Vallelunga, first experience in prototype, and first taste of endurance racing. Later in December, Chuklin tested Formula 3 car of European F3 Open Championship with Emilio de Villota Motorsport at Barcelona and showed fifth time.

Chuklin started the 2015 season in the European F3 Open Winter Series with Emilio de Villota Motorsport. He took part in two races at Paul Ricard.

Later, Chuklin tested and raced with RC Formula in Championnat VdeV. Chuklin scored one pole, one victory and three podiums in nine races. At Mugello, Aleksey Chuklin finished every race on podium and won one race. He did not participate in Championnat VdeV after he was proposed to race in European F3 Open Championship with Corbetta Competizioni. Chuklin returned to European F3 Open Championship in Estoril. Chuklin was in top ten on the first day on his comeback to the European F3 Open Championship. He competed in six races with the team Corbetta Competizioni. After Estoril, where he finished 12th in both races, Chuklin entered the Silverstone round, finishing first race on 11th place and the second on 16th. He did not finish at both races at Red Bull Ring. Chuklin did not score points in European F3 Open Championship in 2015. The season of Championnat VdeV Chuklin finished on the 13th place with 210 points.

In 2016, Chuklin started from some tests at Assen and then started the season in Championnat VdeV with RC Formula at Barcelona. He achieved two pole positions and two podiums during this weekend. Then Chuklin back to Championnat VdeV with MP Motorsport in a Tatuus FR 2.0 2013 car. He did not compete at Paul Ricard and achieved third place in the Championnat VdeV with twelve podiums, one victory, one pole, one fastest lap, and 717 points. This season was the first after 2013 where Chuklin could compete in almost all rounds of certain championship.

In 2017, Chuklin started the season in the European F3 Open Winter Series with Fortec Motorsports. During the season-2017 he was invited by the team Fortec Motorsports to substitute for other drivers when they could not race because of school or other commitments. He competed at Spa-Francorchamps and at Paul Ricard. He scored one point during the second race at Spa-Francorchamps.

In February 2018, it was announced that Chuklin would compete in European Le Mans Series with NEFIS By Speed Factory team along with Timur Boguslavskiy and Danil Pronenko in the LMP3 class on Ligier JS P3 with the Nissan VK50VE 5.0 L V8 engine.

Before the season in European Le Mans Series started, Chuklin took part in the European F3 Open Winter Series with Fortec Motorsports at Paul Ricard.

== Racing record ==
=== Racing career summary ===
Season	Championship	Team	Races	Wins	Poles	F/Laps	Podiums	Points	Position
2011	V de V Challenge Monoplace	V de V	3	2	3	3	2	104	22nd
2011	Formula Renault 2.0 NEC	MP Motorsport	20	0	0	0	0	118	13th
2011	Eurocup Formula Renault 2.0	MP Motorsport	4	0	0	0	0	0	45th
2012	Formula Renault 2.0 Alps	Team Torino Motorsport	2	0	0	0	0	0	44th
2012	Formula Renault 2.0 NEC	Manor MP Motorsport	13	0	0	0	0	23	34th
2012	Eurocup Formula Renault 2.0	Fortec Motorsports	2	0	0	0	0	0	46th
2013	European F3 Open Winter Series	EmiliodeVillota Motorsport	2	0	0	0	1	N/A	NC
2013	European F3 Open Championship	EmiliodeVillota Motorsport	16	0	0	0	0	28	11th
2015	V de V Challenge Monoplace	RC Formula	9	1	1	0	3	206	13th
2015	V de V Challenge Endurance Proto	Extreme Limite	1	0	0	0	0	0	NC
2015	Euroformula Open Championship	Corbetta Competizioni	6	0	0	0	0	0	21st
2016	V de V Challenge Monoplace	RC Formula	3	0	2	0	2	717	**3rd**
2016	V de V Challenge Monoplace	MP Motorsport	15	1	0	1	10	717	**3rd**
2017	Euroformula Open Championship	Fortec Motorsports	4	0	0	0	0	1	21st
2018	European Le Mans Series – LMP3	NEFIS By Speed Factory	6	0	0	0	0	29	9th
2018	International GT Open	BMW Team Teo Martín	2	0	0	0	0	0	59th
2019	Ultimate Cup Series Challenge Proto – LMP3	Speed Factory Racing S.L.	2	0	0	0	1	38	21st
2022	Prototype Cup Germany	Speed Factory Racing							

=== Complete Eurocup Formula Renault 2.0 results ===
(key) (Races in bold indicate pole position; races in italics indicate fastest lap)

Year	Entrant	1	2	3	4	5	6	7	8	9	10	11	12	13	14	DC	Points
2011	MP Motorsport	ALC; 1	ALC; 2	SPA; 1; 35	SPA; 2; 27	NÜR; 1	NÜR; 2	HUN; 1	HUN; 2	SIL; 1; 24	SIL; 2; 32	LEC; 1	LEC; 2	CAT; 1; 23	CAT; 2; 27	45th	0
2012	Fortec Motorsports	ALC; 1	ALC; 2	SPA; 1	SPA; 2	NÜR; 1	NÜR; 2	MSC; 1; 28	MSC; 2; 23	HUN; 1	HUN; 2	LEC; 1	LEC; 2	CAT; 1	CAT; 2	46th	0

=== Complete Formula Renault 2.0 NEC results ===
(key) (Races in bold indicate pole position) (Races in italics indicate fastest lap)

Year	Entrant	1	2	3	4	5	6	7	8	9	10	11	12	13	14	15	16	17	18	19	20	DC	Points
2011	MP Motorsport	HOC; 1; 12	HOC; 2 Ret	HOC; 3; 18	SPA; 1; 35	SPA; 2; 27	NÜR; 1; 18	NÜR; 2; 17	ASS; 1 Ret	ASS; 2; 17	ASS; 3; 15	OSC; 1; 13	OSC; 2; 16	ZAN; 1; 17	ZAN; 2; 10	MST; 1; 14	MST; 2; 16	MST; 3; 12	MNZ; 1; 15	MNZ; 2; 6	MNZ; 3; 12	13th	118
2012	Manor MP Motorsport	HOC; 1; 31	HOC; 2 Ret	HOC; 3; 20	NÜR; 1; 23	NÜR; 2; 29	OSC; 1 Ret	OSC; 2; 16	OSC; 3; 25	ASS; 1	ASS; 2	RBR; 1; 25	RBR; 2 Ret	MST; 1; 25	MST; 2; 10	MST; 3; 15	ZAN; 1	ZAN; 2	ZAN; 3	SPA; 1	SPA; 2	34th	23

=== Complete Formula Renault 2.0 Alps Series results ===
(key) (Races in bold indicate pole position; races in italics indicate fastest lap)

Year	Team	1	2	3	4	5	6	7	8	9	10	11	12	1	14	Pos	Points
2012	Team Torino Motorsport	MNZ; 1	MNZ; 2	PAU; 1	PAU; 2	IMO; 1	IMO; 2	SPA; 1	SPA; 2	RBR; 1	RBR; 2	MUG; 1	MUG; 2	CAT; 1 Ret	CAT; 2; 22	44th	0
