= Esteban García (racing driver) =

Esteban Garcia
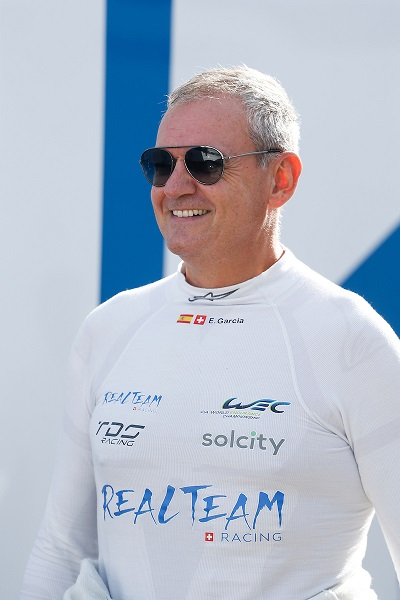
- Garcia in 2021
- Nationality: (Switzerland) Swiss
- Full name: Esteban Garcia de Rontero
- Born: 7 December 1970 (age 55) Lausanne, Switzerland
- Categorisation: FIA Bronze

Previous series
- 2021 2020 2019–2021 2019 2018 2013, 2015–2016: FIA World Endurance Championship; Le Mans Cup; European Le Mans Series; Ultimate Cup Series; V de V Endurance Series; V de V Challenge Monoplace

Esteban Garcia de Rontero (born 7 December 1970) is a Spanish-Swiss entrepreneur, sailor, racing stable owner and car racing driver.

== Entrepreneur ==
García is the founder of the Realstone real estate fund. He currently serves as a board member for the company, which was founded in Lausanne in 2004.

== Sailing ==
García is passionate about sailing and in 2009, as skipper of the Realstone TP52 Matador, he won the TP class of the Royal Regatta of Palma de Mallorca. Since 2013, he has managed Realtime Sailing, a professional sailing team that participates in ocean racing. He also organizes the Realstone Cup on Lake Geneva, launched in 2010.

== Racing career ==
In addition to the sailing team, García also runs a motorsport racing team. His driving career began in 2013 in the V de V Challenge Monoplace. With the switch to sports car and GT racing, his first successes came. He finished the 2018 Gulf 12 Hours in the Ligier JS P3 in third place in the prototype class and the 2020 European Le Mans Series in fifth place in the LMP3 classification. In 2021, he made his debut in the 24 Hours of Le Mans. Together with Loïc Duval and Norman Nato, he finished 17th in the final standings in the Oreca 07.

== Racing record ==
=== Racing career summary ===
Season	Series	Team	Races	Wins	Poles	F/Laps	Podiums	Points	Position
2013	V de V Challenge Monoplace	Sports Promotion	6	0	0	0	0	50	38th
2015	V de V Challenge Monoplace	Sports Promotion	2	0	0	0	0	8	41st
2016	V de V Challenge Monoplace	Sports Promotion	9	0	0	0	0	159	18th
2018	V de V Endurance Series – LMP3	Graff	6	1	0	0	1	111	12th
2018	Gulf 12 Hours – Prototype	Graff	1	0	0	0	1	N/A	3rd
2019	European Le Mans Series – LMP3	Realteam Racing	6	0	1	1	0	31.5	7th
2019	Ultimate Cup Series – Challenge Proto-LMP3	RealTeam	3	0	0	0	1	46	16th
2019	Ultimate Cup Series – Challenge Proto-LMP3-U	RealTeam	1	0	0	0	1	8	3rd
2020	European Le Mans Series – LMP3	Realteam Racing	4	1	1	2	1	50	5th
2020	Le Mans Cup – LMP3	Realteam Racing	2	0	0	0	0	0	NC†
2021	FIA World Endurance Championship – LMP2	Realteam Racing	6	0	0	0	0	50	10th
2021	European Le Mans Series – LMP2	Realteam Racing	1	0	0	0	0	0	NC†
2021	24 Hours of Le Mans – LMP2	Realteam Racing	1	0	0	0	0	N/A	12th

† As he was a guest driver, Garcia was ineligible to score points.
