= 2015 V de V Challenge Monoplace =

Seasons
- ← 2014 2016 →

The 2015 V de V Challenge Monoplace was a multi-event motor racing championship for open wheel, formula racing cars held across Europe. The championship features drivers competing in 2 litre Formula Renault single seat race cars that conform to the technical regulations for the championship. The 2015 season was the sixth V de V Challenge Monoplace season organized by the V de V Sports. The season began at Circuit de Barcelona-Catalunya on 22 March and finishes on 10 October at Circuit de Nevers Magny-Cours.

The season was dominated by RC Formula driver David Droux who won 15 from 17 races. Julien Falchero lost 185.5 points to Droux and finished as runner-up. Gilles Heriau completed the top three in the standings. Riccardo Cazzaniga, Charly Bizalion, Alexandre Jouannem, Aleksey Chuklin and Xavier Benecchi were the other drivers who was able to finish on podium during the races.

== Teams and drivers ==
Entry list
Team	No.	Driver name	Chassis	Rounds
(Italy) GSK Grand Prix	1	(Italy) Riccardo Cazzaniga	Tatuus FR 2.0 2013	All
(Italy) GSK Grand Prix	3	(France) Julien Falchero	Tatuus FR 2.0 2013	All
(Italy) GSK Grand Prix	11	(Italy) Nicola Cazzaniga	Tatuus FR 2.0 2013	1, 3
(Italy) GSK Grand Prix	81	(Italy) Daniele Cazzaniga	Tatuus FR 2.0 2013	5
(France) Formula Motorsport	2	(France) Erwin Creed	Tatuus FR 2.0 2013	1-2, 4, 6
(France) Formula Motorsport	5	(France) Xavier Benecchi	Tatuus FR 2.0 2013	4
(France) Formula Motorsport	6	(France) Erik Attias	Tatuus FR 2.0 2013	1, 3, 6
(France) Formula Motorsport	14	(France) Michel Piroird	Tatuus FR 2.0 2013	1-2, 4-5
(France) Formula Motorsport	14b	(France) Nicolas Pironneau	Tatuus FR 2.0 2013	3
(France) Formula Motorsport	16	(France) Vincent Iogna	Tatuus FR 2.0 2013	4-5
(France) Formula Motorsport	36	(France) Serge Heriau	Tatuus FR 2.0 2013	1-3, 5-6
(France) Formula Motorsport	37	(France) Gilles Heriau	Tatuus FR 2.0 2013	All
(Switzerland) Sports Promotion	4	(Switzerland) Esteban García	Tatuus FR 2.0 2013	1
(Switzerland) Sports Promotion	28	(Switzerland) Thierry Christen	Tatuus FR 2.0 2013	5-6
(Switzerland) Sports Promotion	62	(Switzerland) Christophe Hurni	Tatuus FR 2.0 2013	1-2, 4-6
(Switzerland) Sports Promotion	67	(France) Sébastien Page	Tatuus FR 2.0 2013	4-5
(Switzerland) Sports Promotion	77	(Switzerland) Luis Sanjuan	Tatuus FR 2.0 2013	4-5
(Luxembourg) RC Formula	7	(Belgium) Simon Mirguet	Tatuus FR 2.0 2013	1
(Luxembourg) RC Formula	7b	(France) Benjamin Redais	Tatuus FR 2.0 2013	5
(Luxembourg) RC Formula	7c	(Switzerland) Felix Hirsiger	Tatuus FR 2.0 2013	5
(Luxembourg) RC Formula	7d	(Switzerland) Mickael Grosso	Tatuus FR 2.0 2013	4
(Luxembourg) RC Formula	47	(France) Jordan Perroy	Tatuus FR 2.0 2013	1
(Luxembourg) RC Formula	47b	(Ukraine) Aleksey Chuklin	Tatuus FR 2.0 2013	2-3, 5
(Luxembourg) RC Formula	97	(Switzerland) David Droux	Tatuus FR 2.0 2013	All
(France) SG Racing	9	(France) Oscar Arcila	Tatuus FR2000	All
(France) J.R.T	10	(France) Jorge Domingues	Tatuus FR 2.0 2013	3-4
(France) Atom Formula	17	(France) Thierry Imard	Tatuus FR2000	1, 3-6
(Italy) Viola Formula	18	(Italy) Davide Vettori	Tatuus FR 2.0 2013	2
(Italy) Viola Formula	23	(United Kingdom) Luca Furbatto	Tatuus FR2000	2, 5
(Italy) Viola Formula	29	(Italy) Samuele Fornara	Tatuus FR 2.0 2013	5
(Italy) Brixia Horse Power	19	(Italy) Andrea Baiguera	Tatuus FR 2.0 2013	1-2
(France) Lamo Racing Car	31	(France) Alexis Carmes	Tatuus FR 2.0 2013	1
(France) Lamo Racing Car	32	(Belgium) Loïc Deman	Barazi-Epsilon FR2.0–10	1
(France) Lamo Racing Car	43	(France) François Destandau	Tatuus FR 2.0 2013	3
(France) Lamo Racing Car	53	(France) Gregory Choukroun	Tatuus FR2000	All
(Belgium) NSC Motorsports	40	(Belgium) Thierry Verstraete	Tatuus FR 2000	1-4
(France) CPB Sport	42	(France) Charly Bizalion	Tatuus FR 2.0 2013	1-4
(France) CPB Sport	43	(Morocco) Abdessalam Mzaiti	Tatuus FR 2.0 2013	1-2
(France) CPB Sport	44	(France) Alexandre Jouannem	Tatuus FR 2.0 2013	2-5
(France) CPB Sport	59	(France) Fabrice Rossello	Tatuus FR 2.0 2013	5
(France) Leferme Engineering	55	(France) Emmanuel Charlot	Tatuus FR 2000	5-6
(France) Zig Zag	54	(France) Jean-Christophe Peyre	Barazi-Epsilon FR2.0-10	1-3, 5
(France) Zig Zag	55	(France) Jean-Jacques Bally	Tatuus FR 2000	5
(France) Zig Zag	66	(Monaco) Nicolas Matile	Barazi-Epsilon FR2.0–10	1-3, 5
(France) Zig Zag	69	(Monaco) Christian Carlesi	Barazi-Epsilon FR2.0-10	2-3, 5
(Italy) TS Corse	73	(Italy) Pietro Peccenini	Tatuus FR 2.0 2013	All
(France) Planet Driving G	88	(France) Eric Meriel	Tatuus FR2000	2
(France) Planet Driving G	99	(France) Pascal Brondeau	Tatuus FR2000	2

== Race calendar and results ==
Round		Circuit	Date	Pole position	Fastest lap	Winning driver	Winning team
1	R1	(Spain) Circuit de Barcelona-Catalunya, Montmeló	22 March	(Switzerland) David Droux	(Switzerland) David Droux	(Switzerland) David Droux	(Luxembourg) RC Formula
1	R2	(Spain) Circuit de Barcelona-Catalunya, Montmeló	22 March	(Switzerland) David Droux	(Switzerland) David Droux	(Switzerland) David Droux	(Luxembourg) RC Formula
1	R3	(Spain) Circuit de Barcelona-Catalunya, Montmeló	23 March	Cancelled			
2	R1	(Italy) Mugello Circuit, Mugello	25 April	(Switzerland) David Droux	(Switzerland) David Droux	(Switzerland) David Droux	(Luxembourg) RC Formula
2	R2	(Italy) Mugello Circuit, Mugello	25 April	(Switzerland) David Droux	(Switzerland) David Droux	(Ukraine) Aleksey Chuklin	(Luxembourg) RC Formula
2	R3	(Italy) Mugello Circuit, Mugello	26 April	(Ukraine) Aleksey Chuklin	(Switzerland) David Droux	(Switzerland) David Droux	(Luxembourg) RC Formula
3	R1	(Spain) Ciudad del Motor de Aragón, Alcañiz	30 May	(Switzerland) David Droux	(Italy) Riccardo Cazzaniga	(Switzerland) David Droux	(Luxembourg) RC Formula
3	R2	(Spain) Ciudad del Motor de Aragón, Alcañiz	31 May	(Switzerland) David Droux	(Switzerland) David Droux	(Switzerland) David Droux	(Luxembourg) RC Formula
3	R3	(Spain) Ciudad del Motor de Aragón, Alcañiz	31 May	(Switzerland) David Droux	(Switzerland) David Droux	(Switzerland) David Droux	(Luxembourg) RC Formula
4	R1	(France) Dijon-Prenois, Dijon	27 June	(Switzerland) David Droux	(Switzerland) David Droux	(France) Julien Falchero	(Italy) GSK Grand Prix
4	R2	(France) Dijon-Prenois, Dijon	27 June	(Switzerland) David Droux	(Switzerland) David Droux	(Switzerland) David Droux	(Luxembourg) RC Formula
4	R3	(France) Dijon-Prenois, Dijon	27 June	(Italy) Riccardo Cazzaniga	(Switzerland) David Droux	(Switzerland) David Droux	(Luxembourg) RC Formula
5	R1	(France) Circuit Paul Ricard, Le Castellet	29 August	(Switzerland) David Droux	(Switzerland) David Droux	(Switzerland) David Droux	(Luxembourg) RC Formula
5	R2	(France) Circuit Paul Ricard, Le Castellet	29 August	(Switzerland) David Droux	(Switzerland) David Droux	(Switzerland) David Droux	(Luxembourg) RC Formula
5	R3	(France) Circuit Paul Ricard, Le Castellet	30 August	(Switzerland) David Droux	(Switzerland) David Droux	(Switzerland) David Droux	(Luxembourg) RC Formula
6	R1	(France) Circuit de Nevers Magny-Cours, Magny-Cours	9 October	(Switzerland) David Droux	(Switzerland) David Droux	(Switzerland) David Droux	(Luxembourg) RC Formula
6	R2	(France) Circuit de Nevers Magny-Cours, Magny-Cours	10 October	(Switzerland) David Droux	(Switzerland) David Droux	(Switzerland) David Droux	(Luxembourg) RC Formula
6	R3	(France) Circuit de Nevers Magny-Cours, Magny-Cours	10 October	(Switzerland) David Droux	(Switzerland) David Droux	(Switzerland) David Droux	(Luxembourg) RC Formula

== Drivers' Championship ==
Pos	Driver	CAT (Spain)			MUG (Italy)			ALC (Spain)			DIJ (France)			LEC (France)			MAG (France)			Pts
1	(Switzerland) David Droux	**1**	**1**	C	**1**	**3**	1	**1**	**1**	**1**	**8**	**1**	1	**1**	**1**	**1**	**1**	**1**	**1**	660
2	(France) Julien Falchero	7	8	C	7	6	20	2	2	2	1	14	Ret	4	13	4	2	3	2	474.5
3	(France) Gilles Heriau	15	6	C	11	4	7	6	4	3	5	2	16	3	5	12	3	2	3	458.0
4	(France) Oscar Arcila	10	12	C	12	9	9	11	9	7	12	11	6	11	12	11	5	6	5	435.5
5	(Italy) Riccardo Cazzaniga	3	9	C	3	2	3	4	3	15	2	4	**Ret**	5	2	2				388
6	(Italy) Pietro Peccenini	8	10	C	6	5	5	8	5	4	6	10	7	8	10	6	Ret	4	9	385
7	(France) Grégory Choukroun	17	19	C	20	12	15	16	12	9	17	16	12	14	15	15	8	9	Ret	334.5
8	(Switzerland) Christophe Hurni	13	11	C	14	Ret	11				9	8	4	7	9	10	4	7	12	277
9	(France) Thierry Imard	20	21	C				19	16	13	18	19	14	18	18	20	10	12	8	258
10	(France) Charly Bizalion	Ret	3	C	4	8	4	5	7	Ret	4	3	2							257
11	(France) Erwin Creed	9	15	C	8	Ret	8				7	6	Ret				12	5	4	222
11	(France) Alexandre Jouannem				5	Ret	18	3	6	Ret	Ret	7	17	2	3	3				222
12	(France) Serge Heriau	24	Ret	C	10	13	Ret	Ret	11	6				6	7	8	6	Ret	6	210
13	(Ukraine) Aleksey Chuklin				2	1	**2**	7	17	16				Ret	4	5				206
14	(France) Emmanuel Charlot										19	18	13				9	10	7	159
15	(France) Michel Piroird	11	14	C	13	Ret	Ret				11	15	10	9	8	7				143
16	(France) Eric Meriel	Ret	Ret	C									Ret	19	20	19	11	11	10	131.5
17	(Belgium) Thierry Verstraete	22	Ret	C	22	17	19	18	15	14	20	20	15							125
18	(Italy) Andrea Baiguera	4	5	C	9	7	6													119
19	(France) Vincent Iogna										10	9	5	10	6	9				118
20	(France) Xavier Benecchi										3	5	3							92
21	(Morocco) Abdessalam Mzaiti	16	13	C	17	16	12	12												87
22	(Switzerland) Thierry Christen													Ret	Ret	Ret	7	8	11	93
23	(United Kingdom) Luca Furbatto				18	11	14							15	Ret	14				92
24	(France) Sébastien Page										14	12	10	13	14	13				76
25	(Switzerland) Luis Sanjuan										13	13	11	12	11	16				75
26	(Italy) Nicola Cazzaniga	14	16	C				10	10	8										74
27	(France) Jordan Perroy	2	2	C																72
28	(France) Jean-Christophe Peyre	21	22	C	19	14	16	14	13	Ret				16	18	Ret				70
29	(Monaco) Nicolas Matile	18	20	C	Ret	15	17	Ret	Ret	10				Ret	16	17				65
30	(France) Nicolas Pironneau							9	8	5										64
31	(Italy) Marco Biffis				16	10	13													62
32	(France) Alexis Carmes	5	4	C																55
33	(Belgium) Loïc Deman	6	7	C																46
33	(Monaco) Christian Carlesi				21	18	Ret	13	Ret	Ret				17	17	18				46
34	(Switzerland) Mickael Grosso										16	17	9							36
34	(France) Jorge Domingues							15	Ret	11	15	Ret	Ret							36
35	(Italy) Davide Vettori				15	19	10													33
36	(Italy) Samuele Fornara													15	16	15				29
37i	(France) Pascal Brondeau	23	Ret	C							Ret	Ret	Ret	20	Ret	21				25
38	(France) Erik Attias	19	18	C				Ret	14	Ret										24
39	(France) François Destandau							17	Ret	12										22
40	(Belgium) Simon Mirguet	12	Ret	C																13
41	(Switzerland) Esteban García	26	17	C																8
42	(Italy) Daniele Cazzaniga													Ret	Ret	Ret				0
42	(France) Jean-Jacques Bally													Ret	Ret	Ret				0
42	(France) Fabrice Rossello													Ret	Ret	Ret				0
42	(France) Benjamin Redais													Ret	Ret	Ret				0
42	(Switzerland) Felix Hirsiger													Ret	Ret	Ret				0
Pos	Driver	CAT (Spain)			MUG (Italy)			ALC (Spain)			DIJ (France)			LEC (France)			MAG (France)			Pts

Colour	Result
Gold	Winner
Silver	Second place
Bronze	Third place
Green	Points classification
Blue	Non-points classification
Blue	Non-classified finish (NC)
Purple	Retired, not classified (Ret)
Red	Did not qualify (DNQ)
Red	Did not pre-qualify (DNPQ)
Black	Disqualified (DSQ)
White	Did not start (DNS)
White	Withdrew (WD)
White	Race cancelled (C)
Blank	Did not practice (DNP)
Blank	Did not arrive (DNA)
Blank	Excluded (EX)

**Bold** – Pole
Italics – Fastest Lap
