= Thomas Neubauer =

French racing driver (born 1999)

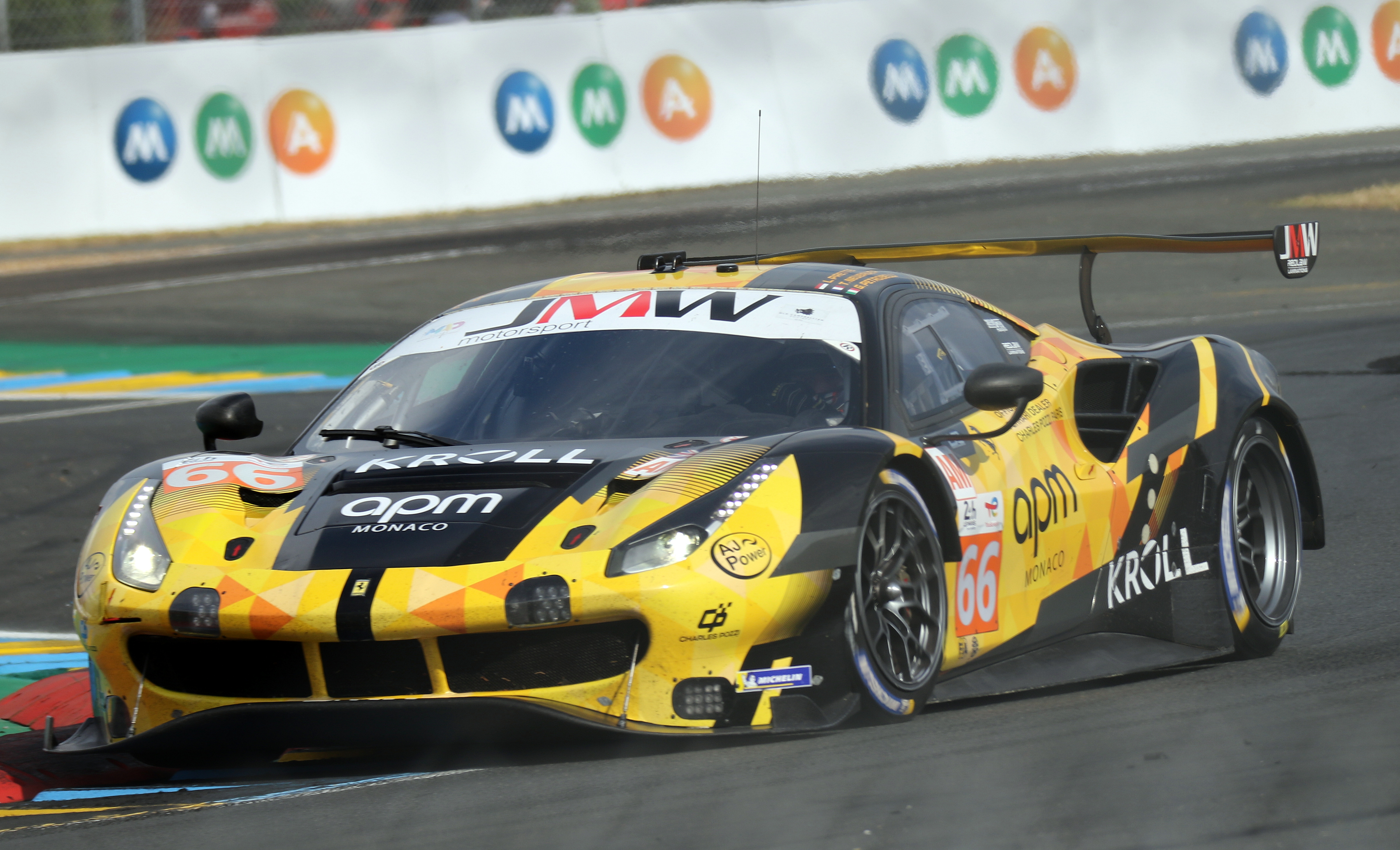
- Neubauer in 2023
- Nationality: French
- Born: 8 June 1999 (age 27) Paris, France

GT World Challenge Europe career
- Current team: AF Corse - Francorchamps Motors
- Categorisation: FIA Silver (until 2022); FIA Gold (2023–)
- Car number: 50
- Starts: 15 (15 entries)
- Wins: 3
- Podiums: 5
- Poles: 3
- Fastest laps: 0
- Best finish: 1st (Silver Cup) in 2022

Previous series
- 2018–2022 2017–2018 2017 2016: Ferrari Challenge Europe; Formula Renault Eurocup; Toyota Racing Series; V de V Challenge Monoplace

Championship titles
- 2022 2019: GTWC Europe Endurance – Silver; GTWC Europe Sprint – Silver

Thomas Neubauer (born 8 June 1999) is a French professional racing driver. He is a former champion of the GT World Challenge Europe Endurance Cup in the Silver Cup category, having also won the Dubai 24 Hour race overall, the Nürburgring 24 Hours in class and the Ferrari Challenge Finali Mondiali all in the same year.

Since 2024, Neubauer has been a Ferrari factory driver.

== Early career ==
=== Lower formulae ===
After making his single-seater debut at the back end of 2016, scoring a podium in the V de V Challenge Monoplace, Neubauer took part in the Toyota Racing Series during the winter of the following year. He ended up 17th in the standings, taking home a best finish of ninth at Taupo.

=== Formula Renault ===
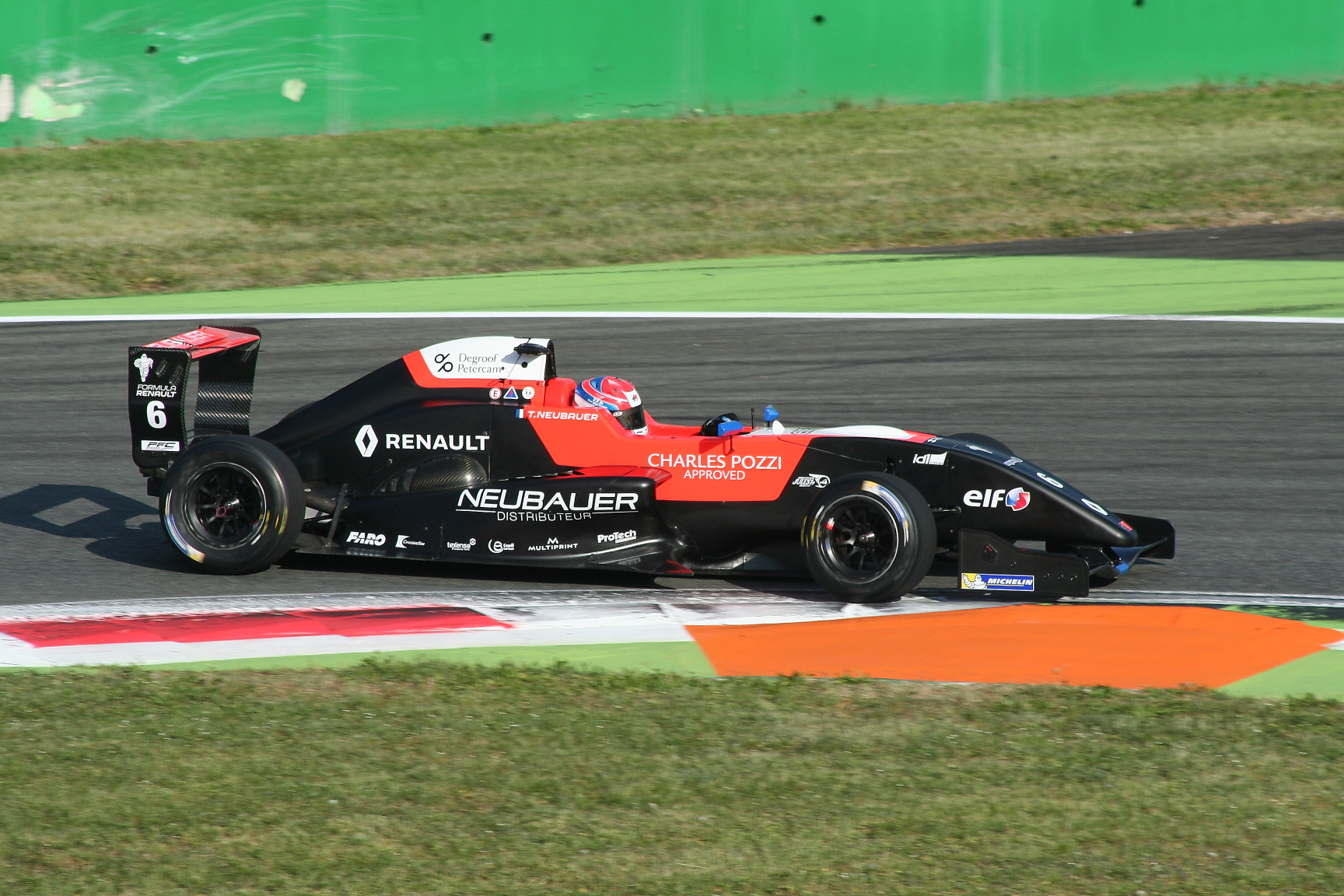
Neubauer racing in Formula Renault Eurocup at Monza in 2017.

Neubauer's main campaign during 2017 would lie in the Formula Renault Eurocup, where Neubauer partnered Gabriel Aubry, Thomas Maxwell and Max Fewtrell at Tech 1 Racing. The season proved to be disappointing, as the Frenchman failed to score any points, with his teammates all finishing ahead of him in the championship.

For the 2018 season, Neubauer returned to the French outfit, once again competing in the Eurocup. Two top-ten finishes, which included a sixth place at Monza, were enough to place Neubauer 17th overall at the end of the campaign.

== Sportscar career ==
=== 2019: GT debut and first title ===
In 2019, Neubauer made a switch to sportscar racing, partnering Nico Bastian in the Silver category of the Blancpain GT Series Sprint Cup with AKKA ASP, whilst also competing in the Ferrari Challenge Europe for the Charles Pozzi – Courage operation. The season in the latter would bear fruit, as Neubauer took three podiums, coupled with a pole position during the opening round, which propelled him to sixth in the standings despite missing the round at the Red Bull Ring. Meanwhile, Neubauer experienced an even more successful campaign in the Blancpain Sprint Cup, where four class victories, which included an overall win on his GT debut in Brands Hatch at the wheel of a Mercedes-AMG GT3, made him and his German teammate Silver Cup champions.

=== 2020: Further victories ===
Neubauer remained in the Silver Cup in 2020, returning to his old Formula Renault team Tech 1 Racing to perform double duties in the GT World Challenge Europe Endurance and Sprint cups, aboard a Lexus RC F GT3. In the former, a sole podium at the final round in Le Castellet ended up being the highlight of a season that concluded with Neubauer, Timothé Buret and Aurélien Panis taking eighth in the Silver Cup classification. In the latter, he finished seventh and last of all full-time Silver Cup entries despite winning Race 2 at Zandvoort and taking two overall pole positions in Misano.

During the same year, Neubauer once again raced in the Ferrari Challenge, taking three victories from as many events.

=== 2021: Focus on Endurance ===
For 2021, the Frenchman would be restricted to the GTWC Europe Endurance Cup, where he drove for Walkenhorst Motorsport alongside Martin Tomczyk and former F1 driver Timo Glock. Unfortunately for Neubauer, he and his teammates were unable to score any podiums throughout the campaign, which left them with a championship finish of 22nd, albeit as the highest-placed BMW squad. The Ferrari Challenge Europe, where Neubauer once again drove for the team bearing the name of Charles Pozzi, would yield just three podiums, with the French driver competing in three out of seven rounds.

In addition, Neubauer made his debut in the 24 Hours of Le Mans, racing a Ferrari 488 GTE Evo in the LMGTE Am category for JMW Motorsport. The team retired from the race after 117 laps.

=== 2022: Multiple championship victories ===
Having begun his 2022 season by winning the Dubai 24 Hour race from pole position, Neubauer was announced to be joining ROFGO Racing with Team WRT, driving an Audi R8 LMS Evo II alongside Benjamin Goethe in the GT World Challenge Europe Sprint Cup, with the two being partnered by Jean-Baptiste Simmenauer in the Endurance Cup.

The season in the Sprint Cup began disappointingly, with a collision in Race 1 at Brands Hatch being followed by a 16th place the following day. Next came two top-ten finishes in class at Magny-Cours, before Neubauer and Goethe finished third in class at both Zandvoort races, results which also yielded their first points of the overall championship. More success came at the penultimate round in Misano, as the pairing won their class and took an overall podium in the first race, which they followed by scoring another podium in the Silver Cup on Sunday, with a lapped car blocking Neubauer at the safety car restart, costing the team a chance of obtaining a double class victory. The campaign ended with a fourth place and class podium at Valencia, placing Neubauer and Goethe third in the Sprint Cup standings.

Even more glory came in the Endurance Cup, a campaign which Neubauer and his teammates started by taking a class victory in Imola, after which the trio scored a fourth place in the Silver Cup at Le Castellet. Neubauer and the team managed to put together a mistake-free race during the crowning jewel of the calendar, the 24 Hours of Spa, which earned them the Silver Cup win, which the Frenchman called his "most beautiful victory". Third in class at the Hockenheimring proved to be enough for Neubauer, Simmenauer and Goethe to confirm their status as Silver Cup champions. Despite clinching the championship with a race to go, the outfit went on to finish the season in style, winning the season finale in Barcelona.

As well as the victory in Dubai, Neubauer would take two further victories in one-off races during the year, winning the 24 Hours of Nürburgring in the SP10 category, whilst also taking the checkered flag first in the Finali Mondiali of the Ferrari Challenge. Neubauer's performances in the 2022 season earned him an upgrade to gold status in the FIA's driver categorisation for 2023.

=== 2023 ===
2023 saw Neubauer return to Team WRT, joining Simmenauer in the Pro class of the 2023 Sprint Cup.

== Personal life ==
Neubauer is the son of Eric Neubauer, chairman of the Neubauer Groupe, a French car distributor founded in 1905. In 2010, the group acquired major Ferrari dealer Charles Pozzi SA.

Neubauer was a late starter to racing, coming into contact with the sport of karting at the age of 13. Having been focused on his studies, the Frenchman went on to study sports science at the École de management Paris La Défense.

== Racing record ==
=== Racing career summary ===
| Season | Series | Team | Races | Wins | Poles | F/Laps | Podiums | Points | Position |
|---|---|---|---|---|---|---|---|---|---|
| 2016 | V de V Challenge Monoplace | Formula Motorsport | 9 | 0 | 0 | 0 | 1 | 283 | 13th |
| 2016 | Formula Renault 2.0 NEC | Formula Motorsport | 2 | 0 | 0 | 0 | 0 | 1 | 32nd |
| 2017 | Toyota Racing Series | MTEC Motorsport | 15 | 0 | 0 | 0 | 0 | 308 | 17th |
| 2017 | Formula Renault Eurocup | Tech 1 Racing | 23 | 0 | 0 | 0 | 0 | 0 | 23rd |
| 2017 | Formula Renault NEC | Tech 1 Racing | 6 | 0 | 0 | 0 | 0 | 42 | 13th |
| 2018 | Formula Renault Eurocup | Tech 1 Racing | 16 | 0 | 0 | 0 | 0 | 9 | 17th |
| 2018 | Formula Renault NEC | Tech 1 Racing | 4 | 0 | 0 | 0 | 0 | 0 | NC† |
| 2019 | Blancpain GT Series Sprint Cup | AKKA ASP Team | 10 | 1 | 0 | 0 | 1 | 29 | 9th |
| 2019 | Blancpain GT Series Sprint Cup - Silver Cup | AKKA ASP Team | 10 | 4 | 3 | 1 | 6 | 112.5 | **1st** |
| 2019 | Blancpain GT Series Endurance Cup | HB Racing | 1 | 0 | 0 | 0 | 0 | 0 | NC |
| 2019 | Blancpain GT Series Endurance Cup - Am | HB Racing | 1 | 0 | 0 | 0 | 0 | 24 | 18th |
| 2019 | Ferrari Challenge Europe - Trofeo Pirelli | Charles Pozzi – Courage | 10 | 0 | 1 | 0 | 3 | 81 | 6th |
| 2019 | Ferrari Challenge Finali Mondiali - Trofeo Pirelli | Charles Pozzi – Courage | 1 | 0 | 0 | 0 | 0 | N/A | 5th |
| 2019 | VLN Series - V4 | Jaco's Paddock Motorsport | 1 | 0 | 0 | 0 | 0 | 6.74 | 92nd |
| 2020 | GT World Challenge Europe Endurance Cup | Tech 1 Racing | 4 | 0 | 0 | 0 | 0 | 0 | NC |
| 2020 | GT World Challenge Europe Endurance Cup - Silver Cup | Tech 1 Racing | 4 | 0 | 1 | 0 | 1 | 44 | 8th |
| 2020 | GT World Challenge Europe Sprint Cup | Tech 1 Racing | 10 | 0 | 2 | 1 | 0 | 14.5 | 16th |
| 2020 | GT World Challenge Europe Sprint Cup - Silver Cup | Tech 1 Racing | 10 | 1 | 2 | 4 | 2 | 60 | 7th |
| 2020 | Ferrari Challenge Europe - Trofeo Pirelli | Charles Pozzi – Courage | 6 | 3 | 4 | 3 | 4 | 73 | 5th |
| 2020 | Ferrari Challenge Finali Mondiali - Trofeo Pirelli | Charles Pozzi – Courage | 1 | 0 | 1 | 0 | 0 | N/A | DSQ |
| 2021 | GT World Challenge Europe Endurance Cup | Walkenhorst Motorsport | 5 | 0 | 0 | 0 | 0 | 9 | 22nd |
| 2021 | Nürburgring Endurance Series - SP9 | Walkenhorst Motorsport | 5 | 0 | 0 | 0 | 0 | N/A | NC† |
| 2021 | Ferrari Challenge Europe - Trofeo Pirelli | Charles Pozzi – Courage | 5 | 0 | 0 | 0 | 3 | 45 | 7th |
| 2021 | Ferrari Challenge Finali Mondiali - Trofeo Pirelli | Charles Pozzi – Courage | 1 | 0 | 0 | 0 | 0 | N/A | DNF |
| 2021 | 24 Hours of Le Mans - LMGTE Am | JMW Motorsport | 1 | 0 | 0 | 0 | 0 | N/A | DNF |
| 2022 | GT World Challenge Europe Endurance Cup | ROFGO Racing with Team WRT | 5 | 0 | 0 | 0 | 0 | 1 | 35th |
| 2022 | GT World Challenge Europe Endurance Cup - Silver Cup | ROFGO Racing with Team WRT | 5 | 3 | 2 | 0 | 4 | 125 | **1st** |
| 2022 | GT World Challenge Europe Sprint Cup | ROFGO Racing with Team WRT | 10 | 0 | 0 | 0 | 1 | 18.5 | 11th |
| 2022 | GT World Challenge Europe Sprint Cup - Silver Cup | ROFGO Racing with Team WRT | 10 | 1 | 1 | 1 | 5 | 82 | **3rd** |
| 2022 | Intercontinental GT Challenge | Team WRT | 1 | 0 | 0 | 0 | 0 | 2 | 18th |
| 2022 | 24H GT Series - GT3 | MS7 by WRT | 1 | 1 | 0 | 0 | 1 | 0 | NC† |
| 2022 | Dubai 24 Hour - GT3-Pro | MS7 by WRT | 1 | 1 | 1 | 0 | 1 | N/A | **1st** |
| 2022 | 24 Hours of Nürburgring - SP10 | FK Performance Motorsport | 1 | 1 | 0 | 0 | 1 | N/A | **1st** |
| 2022 | Ferrari Challenge Europe - Trofeo Pirelli | Charles Pozzi – Courage | 6 | 0 | 0 | 0 | 3 | 44 | 7th |
| 2022 | Ferrari Challenge Finali Mondiali - Trofeo Pirelli | Charles Pozzi – Courage | 1 | 1 | 1 | 1 | 1 | N/A | **1st** |
| 2023 | GT World Challenge Europe Endurance Cup | Walkenhorst Motorsport | 4 | 0 | 0 | 0 | 0 | 0 | NC |
| 2023 | 24 Hours of Nürburgring - SP9 | Walkenhorst Motorsport | 1 | 0 | 0 | 0 | 0 | N/A | DNF |
| 2023 | GT World Challenge Europe Sprint Cup | Team WRT | 10 | 0 | 0 | 0 | 1 | 12.5 | 11th |
| 2023 | Ferrari Challenge Europe - Trofeo Pirelli (Pro) | Charles Pozzi GT Racing | 1 | 1 | 1 | 1 | 1 | 23 | 7th |
| 2023 | International GT Open | Team Motopark | 2 | 0 | 0 | 0 | 0 | 6 | 28th |
| 2023 | 24 Hours of Le Mans - LMGTE Am | JMW Motorsport | 1 | 0 | 0 | 0 | 0 | N/A | DNF |
| 2024 | GT World Challenge Europe Endurance Cup | AF Corse - Francorchamps Motors | 5 | 0 | 0 | 0 | 0 | 1 | 31st |
| 2024 | IMSA SportsCar Championship - GTD Pro | DragonSpeed | 1 | 0 | 0 | 0 | 0 | 229 | 42th |
| 2025 | IMSA SportsCar Championship - GTD Pro | DragonSpeed | 1 | 0 | 0 | 0 | 0 | 269 | 30th |
| 2025 | Nürburgring Langstrecken-Serie - SP9 | Realize Kondo Racing with Rinaldi | | | | | | | |
| 2025 | 24 Hours of Nürburgring - SP9 | Realize Kondo Racing with Rinaldi | 1 | 0 | 0 | 0 | 0 | N/A | DNF |
| 2025 | Intercontinental GT Challenge | Realize Kondo Racing with Rinaldi | 1 | 0 | 0 | 0 | 0 | 4 | 30th |
| 2025 | Intercontinental GT Challenge | Maezawa Racing | 1 | 0 | 0 | 0 | 0 | 4 | 30th |
| 2025 | GT World Challenge Europe Sprint Cup | AF Corse - Francorchamps Motors | 10 | 0 | 0 | 0 | 0 | 17 | 12th |
| 2026 | Nürburgring Langstrecken-Serie - SP9 | Realize Kondo Racing with Rinaldi | | | | | | | |
| 2026 | 24 Hours of Nürburgring - SP9 | Realize Kondo Racing with Rinaldi | 1 | 0 | 0 | 0 | 0 | N/A | DNF |
| 2026 | International GT Open | AF Corse | 6 | 0 | 0 | 0 | 0 | 28 | 16th |
| 2026 | GT World Challenge Europe Sprint Cup | AF Corse | 10 | 1 | 0 | 0 | 3 | 65.5 | **2nd** |

^{†} As Neubauer was a guest driver, he was ineligible for points.
^{*} Season still in progress.

=== Complete Formula Renault 2.0 NEC results ===
(key) (Races in bold indicate pole position) (Races in italics indicate fastest lap)

| Year | Entrant | 1 | 2 | 3 | 4 | 5 | 6 | 7 | 8 | 9 | 10 | 11 | 12 | 13 | 14 | 15 | DC | Points |
|---|---|---|---|---|---|---|---|---|---|---|---|---|---|---|---|---|---|---|
| 2016 | Formula Motorsport | MNZ; 1 | MNZ; 2 | SIL; 1 | SIL; 2 | HUN; 1 | HUN; 2 | SPA; 1; 20 | SPA; 2; 23 | ASS; 1 | ASS; 2 | NÜR; 1 | NÜR; 2 | HOC; 1 | HOC; 2 | HOC; 3 | 32nd | 1 |
| 2017 | Tech 1 Racing | MNZ; 1; 6 | MNZ; 2 Ret | ASS; 1 | ASS; 2 | NÜR; 1; 9 | NÜR; 2 Ret | SPA; 1; 25 | SPA; 2; 33 | SPA; 3; 29 | HOC; 1; 14 | HOC; 2; 11 | | | | | 11th | 52 |
| 2018 | Tech 1 Racing | PAU; 1; 7 | PAU; 2; 7 | MNZ; 1; 7 | MNZ; 2; 5 | SPA; 1 WD | SPA; 2 WD | HUN; 1 Ret | HUN; 2 Ret | NÜR; 1; 21 | NÜR; 2; 10 | HOC; 1 Ret | HOC; 2 Ret | | | | 8th | 58 |

=== Complete Toyota Racing Series results ===
(key) (Races in bold indicate pole position) (Races in italics indicate fastest lap)

| Year | Team | 1 | 2 | 3 | 4 | 5 | 6 | 7 | 8 | 9 | 10 | 11 | 12 | 13 | 14 | 15 | DC | Points |
|---|---|---|---|---|---|---|---|---|---|---|---|---|---|---|---|---|---|---|
| 2017 | MTEC Motorsport | RUA; 1; 16 | RUA; 2; 18 | RUA; 3; 14 | TER; 1; 20 | TER; 2; 13 | TER; 3; 13 | HMP; 1 Ret | HMP; 2; 14 | HMP; 3; 13 | TAU; 1; 11 | TAU; 2; 9 | TAU; 3; 18 | MAN; 1; 16 | MAN; 2; 15 | MAN; 3; 14 | 17th | 308 |

=== Complete Formula Renault Eurocup results ===
(key) (Races in bold indicate pole position) (Races in italics indicate fastest lap)

| Year | Team | 1 | 2 | 3 | 4 | 5 | 6 | 7 | 8 | 9 | 10 | 11 | 12 | 13 | 14 | 15 | 16 | 17 | 18 | 19 | 20 | 21 | 22 | 23 | Pos | Points |
|---|---|---|---|---|---|---|---|---|---|---|---|---|---|---|---|---|---|---|---|---|---|---|---|---|---|---|
| 2017 | Tech 1 Racing | MNZ; 1; 23 | MNZ; 2; 11 | SIL; 1; 18 | SIL; 2; 17 | PAU; 1; 24 | PAU; 2; 24 | MON; 1 Ret | MON; 2 Ret | HUN; 1; 17 | HUN; 2; 27 | HUN; 3; 15 | NÜR; 1; 15 | NÜR; 2 Ret | RBR; 1; 17 | RBR; 2; 11 | LEC; 1; 16 | LEC; 2; 14 | SPA; 1; 25 | SPA; 2; 33 | SPA; 3; 29 | CAT; 1 Ret | CAT; 2 Ret | CAT; 3; 19 | 23rd | 0 |
| 2018 | Tech 1 Racing | LEC; 1; 12 | LEC; 2; 17 | MNZ; 1; 14 | MNZ; 2; 6 | SIL; 1; 18 | SIL; 2; 24 | MON; 1; 26 | MON; 2; 23 | RBR; 1 DNS | RBR; 2 DNS | SPA; 1 WD | SPA; 2 WD | HUN; 1 Ret | HUN; 2 Ret | NÜR; 1; 21 | NÜR; 2; 10 | HOC; 1 Ret | HOC; 2 Ret | CAT; 1; 14 | CAT; 2; 23 | | | | 17th | 9 |

=== Complete GT World Challenge results ===
==== GT World Challenge Europe Sprint Cup ====
(key) (Races in bold indicate pole position) (Races in italics indicate fastest lap)

| Year | Team | Car | Class | 1 | 2 | 3 | 4 | 5 | 6 | 7 | 8 | 9 | 10 | Pos. | Points |
|---|---|---|---|---|---|---|---|---|---|---|---|---|---|---|---|
| 2019 | AKKA ASP Team | Mercedes-AMG GT3 | Silver | **BRH**; **1**; 1 | BRH; 2; 8 | **MIS**; **1**; 20 | MIS; 2; 6 | ZAN; 1; 9 | ZAN; 2; 12 | NÜR; 1; 24 | NÜR; 2; 18 | **HUN**; **1**; 7 | HUN; 2; 8 | 1st | 112.5 |
| 2020 | Tech 1 Racing | Lexus RC F GT3 | Silver | **MIS**; **1** Ret | MIS; 2; 15 | **MIS**; **3**; 19 | MAG; 1 Ret | MAG; 2; 18 | ZAN; 1; 7 | ZAN; 2; 4 | CAT; 1; 12 | CAT; 2; 19 | CAT; 3; 8 | 7th | 60 |
| 2022 | ROFGO Racing with Team WRT | Audi R8 LMS Evo II | Silver | BRH; 1 Ret | BRH; 2; 16 | MAG; 1; 11 | MAG; 2; 13 | ZAN; 1; 10 | ZAN; 2; 10 | **MIS**; **1**; 3 | MIS; 2; 10 | VAL; 1; 4 | VAL; 2; 15 | 3rd | 82 |
| 2023 | BMW M Team WRT | BMW M4 GT3 | Pro | BRH; 1; 13 | BRH; 2; 15 | MIS; 1; 15 | MIS; 2; 3 | HOC; 1; 11 | HOC; 2; 11 | VAL; 1; 16 | VAL; 2; 29 | ZAN; 1; 7 | ZAN; 2; 13 | 11th | 12.5 |
| 2025 | AF Corse - Francorchamps Motors | Ferrari 296 GT3 | Pro | BRH; 1; 5 | BRH; 2; 4 | ZAN; 1; 9 | ZAN; 2 Ret | MIS; 1 Ret | MIS; 2; 24 | MAG; 1; 12 | MAG; 2; 10 | VAL; 1; 8 | VAL; 2; 19 | 12th | 17 |
| 2026 | AF Corse | Ferrari 296 GT3 Evo | Pro | BRH; 1; 1 | BRH; 2; 15 | MIS; 1; 9 | MIS; 2; 6 | MAG; 1; 2 | MAG; 2; 4 | ZAN; 1; 6 | ZAN; 2; 5 | CAT; 1 Ret | CAT; 2; 2 | 2nd | 65.5 |

^{*} Season still in progress.

==== GT World Challenge Europe Endurance Cup ====
(Races in bold indicate pole position) (Races in italics indicate fastest lap)

| Year | Team | Car | Class | 1 | 2 | 3 | 4 | 5 | 6 | 7 | Pos. | Points |
|---|---|---|---|---|---|---|---|---|---|---|---|---|
| 2019 | HB Racing | Ferrari 488 GT3 | Am | MNZ | SIL | LEC | SPA; 6H; 43 | SPA; 12H; 43 | SPA; 24H; 38 | CAT | 18th | 24 |
| 2020 | Tech 1 Racing | Lexus RC F GT3 | Silver | **IMO**; 19 | NÜR; 39 | SPA; 6H; 28 | SPA; 12H; 43 | SPA; 24H; Ret | LEC; 16 | | 8th | 44 |
| 2021 | Walkenhorst Motorsport | BMW M6 GT3 | Pro | MNZ; 12 | LEC; 9 | SPA; 6H; 3 | SPA; 12H; 49† | SPA; 24H; Ret | NÜR; 15 | CAT; Ret | 22nd | 9 |
| 2022 | ROFGO Racing with Team WRT | Audi R8 LMS Evo II | Silver | IMO; 14 | **LEC**; 15 | SPA; 6H; 15 | SPA; 12H; 19 | SPA; 24H; 13 | **HOC**; 10 | CAT; 11 | 1st | 125 |
| 2023 | Walkenhorst Motorsport | BMW M4 GT3 | Bronze | MNZ; 22 | LEC; Ret | SPA; 6H; 45 | SPA; 12H; 31 | SPA; 24H; 46† | NÜR; 41 | CAT | 25th | 9 |
| 2024 | AF Corse - Francorchamps Motors | Ferrari 296 GT3 | Pro | LEC; 17 | SPA; 6H; 13 | SPA; 12H; 22 | SPA; 24H; Ret | NÜR; 10 | MNZ; 34 | JED; 21 | 31st | 1 |

=== Complete 24 Hours of Le Mans results ===
| Year | Team | Co-Drivers | Car | Class | Laps | Pos. | Class Pos. |
|---|---|---|---|---|---|---|---|
| 2021 | (United Kingdom) JMW Motorsport | (United Kingdom) Jody Fannin (United States) Rodrigo Sales | Ferrari 488 GTE Evo | GTE; Am | 117 | DNF | DNF |
| 2023 | (United Kingdom) JMW Motorsport | (Italy) Giacomo Petrobelli (Monaco) Louis Prette | Ferrari 488 GTE Evo | GTE; Am | 89 | DNF | DNF |

=== Complete IMSA SportsCar Championship results ===
(key) (Races in bold indicate pole position; results in italics indicate fastest lap)

| Year | Team | Class | Make | Engine | 1 | 2 | 3 | 4 | 5 | 6 | 7 | 8 | 9 | 10 | Pos. | Points |
|---|---|---|---|---|---|---|---|---|---|---|---|---|---|---|---|---|
| 2024 | DragonSpeed | GTD Pro | Ferrari 296 GT3 | Ferrari F163CE 3.0 L Turbo V6 | DAY | SEB | LGA | DET | WGL | MOS | ELK | VIR | IMS | PET; 10 | 42th | 229 |
| 2025 | DragonSpeed | GTD Pro | Ferrari 296 GT3 | Ferrari F163CE 3.0 L Turbo V6 | DAY; 6 | SEB | LGA | DET | WGL | MOS | ELK | VIR | IMS | PET | 30th | 269 |
