= Alex Peroni =

Australian racing driver

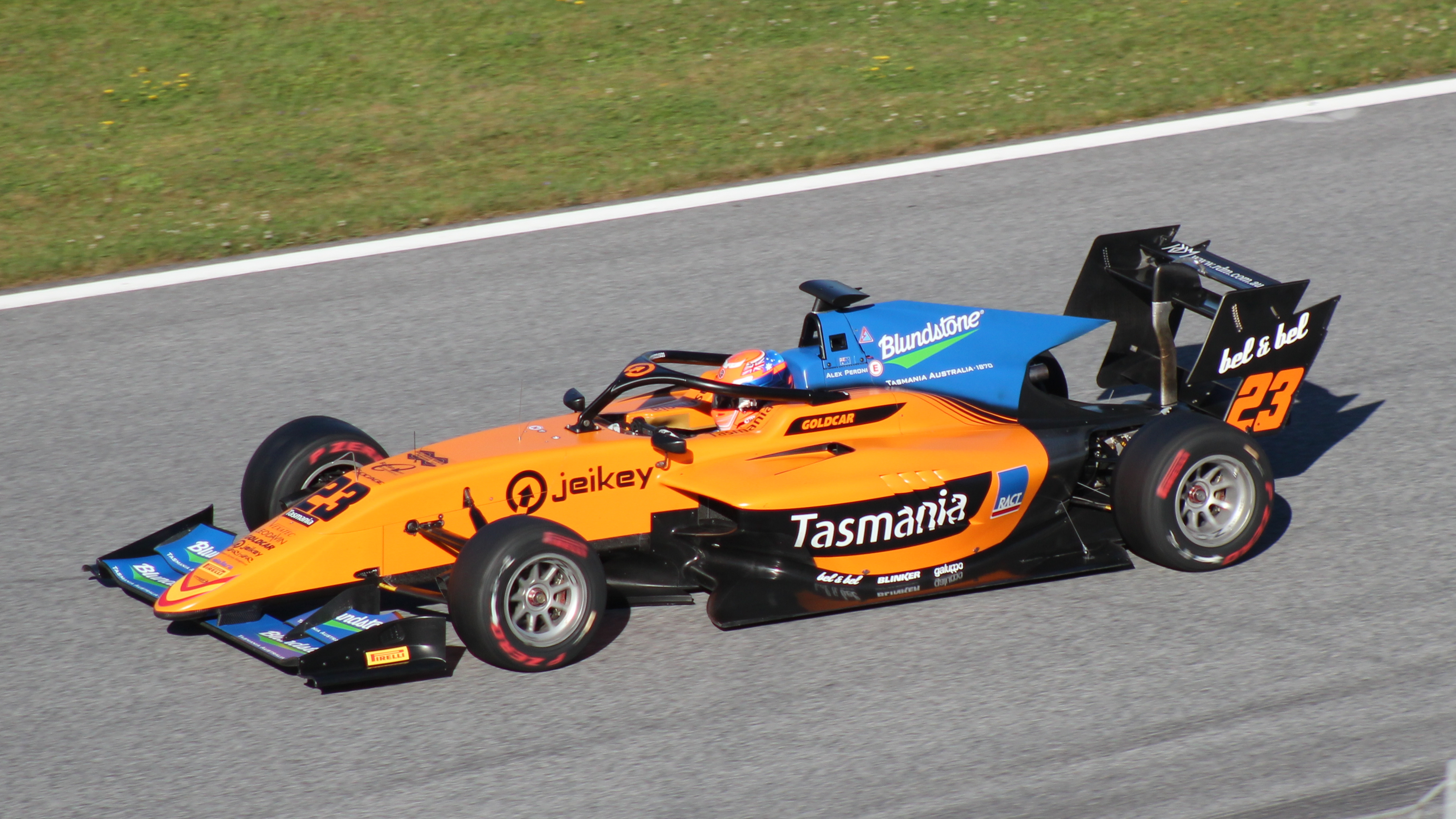
- Peroni in Red Bull Ring FIA Formula 3 Championship
- Nationality: (Australia) Australian
- Born: 27 November 1999 (age 26) Hobart, Tasmania, Australia

GT World Challenge Australia career
- Debut season: 2024
- Current team: Team BRM
- Categorisation: FIA Silver (until 2021); FIA Gold (2022–)
- Car number: 268
- Starts: 26
- Wins: 5
- Podiums: 7
- Poles: 2
- Fastest laps: 0
- Best finish: 5th in 2024 (Pro-Am)

Previous series
- 2023 2022 2022 2021 2019-20 2017-18 2016-18 2016 2015: GT World Challenge Europe; Euroformula Open Championship; European Le Mans Series; Indy Lights; FIA Formula 3 Championship; Formula Renault NEC; Eurocup Formula Renault 2.0; Challenge Monoplace; Italian F4 Championship

Championship titles
- 2016: Challenge Monoplace

Alexander James Peroni (born 27 November 1999) is an Australian racing driver. He currently competes in the 2026 GT World Challenge Australia for Team BRM. He has previously competed in a number of open wheel, endurance, and GT racing series. Peroni is the 2016 Challenge Monoplace champion.

== Career ==
=== Formula 4 ===
In 2015, Peroni graduated from kart racing to single-seaters, participating in the Italian F4 Championship with Torino Squadra Corse, finishing fourteenth overall and securing two second place podium finishes at Imola and Misano.

=== Formula Renault ===
In 2016, Peroni continued his collaboration with TS Corse, competing in Formula Renault 2.0 machinery in the V de V Challenge Monoplace. He dominated the season and won fourteen from 21 races to clinch the championship title.

For 2017, Peroni switched to Formula Renault Eurocup but decided to move to the Fortec Motorsport team. He won race 2 at Pau and finished the season tenth in the drivers' standings ahead of his teammates Aleksey Korneev, Najiy Razak and Frank Bird.

In 2018, Peroni moved to MP Motorsport to again compete in the Formula Renault Eurocup, where he finished ninth in the championship, with the highlights being a first and second place in the two Monaco events. He also won both races of the first round of the NEC series on the streets of Pau, which was his only NEC event of the year.

=== FIA Formula 3 ===
==== 2019 ====
For 2019, Peroni moved to the FIA Formula 3 Championship with Campos Racing.

In the 2019 Italian feature race at Monza, a week after the crash which took Anthoine Hubert’s life and put Juan Manuel Correa in a coma, Peroni had a serious crash after hitting a "sausage kerb" at the Parabolica which sent him into a somersault into the tyre barriers, finally coming to a stop at the catch fence. He walked away from the crash, but was later diagnosed with a broken vertebra. On medical advice Peroni missed the remainder of the season, along with the Macau Grand Prix. He finished the 2019 season in twentieth place in the driver standings with five points - the only points scored by Campos that season.

==== 2020 ====
After recovering from the injuries sustained in his crash at Monza, Peroni returned to compete in FIA Formula 3 with Campos Racing at the delayed start of the 2020 season. At pre-season testing in Bahrain, in April 2020, he scored the fastest overall time. In the first race of the 2020 season at the Red Bull Ring in Austria, he secured his first FIA F3 podium, with a third place finish. Peroni went on to secure a further two podiums in the season: third place in Race 2 at Silverstone, and second place in Race 2 in Barcelona.

At the end of the 2020 FIA Formula 3 Championship, Peroni took tenth place in the final driver standings, with a total of 64 points. As in 2019, his points were the only ones scored by Campos that season.

In recognition of his success in the 2020 FIA Formula 3 Championship, Peroni was awarded the 2020 Peter Brock Medal. Previous winners of the medal, named after Australian motorsport icon Peter Brock, include Mark Webber and Craig Lowndes. Peroni departed Formula 3 at the end of the season.

=== Indy Lights ===
At the end of 2020, Peroni announced a move from FIA Formula 3 to the North American based series Indy Lights. UK-based team Carlin signed Peroni in a one-year deal for the 2021 season, marking their own return to the Indy Lights series after a two-year break.

Peroni scored his only Indy Lights podium with a third-place finish in the second race at Indianapolis Motor Speedway in May 2021.

In September 2021, Peroni announced that he would be ending his Indy Lights season early, and would not be competing in the final three rounds, instead returning to Europe to focus on opportunities there.

=== Euroformula Open ===
Peroni signed with Drivex School to compete in the 2022 Euroformula Open Championship. However after the first round, Peroni unexpectedly stopped his campaign.

=== European Le Mans ===
In 2022, Peroni signed with Algave Pro Racing to compete in the 2022 European Le Mans Series with fellow Australian James Allen and American John Falb as teammates. The trio competed in the LMP2 Pro-Am class, and recorded three Pro-Am podiums across the season.

=== GT World Challenge ===
In 2023, Peroni shifted focus from prototypes to GT3 racing, competing for GetSpeed Performance in the GT World Challenge Europe Endurance Cup. Peroni's co-drivers were Patrick Assenheimer and Florian Scholze, and the team competed in the Bronze Cup class. The team suffered a tricky season, the only highlight being a ninth place finish in class at the 24 hours of Spa.

For 2024, Peroni returned to Australia to compete in GT World Challenge Australia alongside Mark Rosser in a Team BRM Audi R8. Over their first two seasons together, the duo would score four wins, five podiums, and a best finish in the championship of fifth in 2024. Peroni would miss the start of the 2026 season due to injury, replaced by Thomas Randle.

== Racing record ==
=== Racing career summary ===
| Season | Series | Team | Races | Wins | Poles | F/laps | Podiums | Points | Position |
|---|---|---|---|---|---|---|---|---|---|
| 2015 | Italian F4 Championship | Torino Squadra Corse | 21 | 0 | 0 | 0 | 2 | 43 | 14th |
| 2016 | V de V Challenge Monoplace | TS Corse | 21 | 14 | 11 | 12 | 19 | 947 | **1st** |
| 2016 | Eurocup Formula Renault 2.0 | TS Corse | 2 | 0 | 0 | 0 | 0 | 0 | NC† |
| 2017 | Formula Renault Eurocup | Fortec Motorsports | 23 | 1 | 1 | 0 | 1 | 72 | 10th |
| 2017 | Formula Renault NEC | Fortec Motorsports | 3 | 0 | 0 | 0 | 0 | 0 | NC† |
| 2018 | Formula Renault Eurocup | MP Motorsport | 20 | 1 | 1 | 1 | 2 | 89 | 9th |
| 2018 | Formula Renault NEC | MP Motorsport | 2 | 2 | 1 | 1 | 2 | 60 | 7th‡ |
| 2019 | FIA Formula 3 Championship | Campos Racing | 13 | 0 | 0 | 0 | 0 | 5 | 20th |
| 2020 | FIA Formula 3 Championship | Campos Racing | 18 | 0 | 0 | 2 | 3 | 64 | 10th |
| 2021 | Indy Lights | Carlin | 14 | 0 | 0 | 0 | 1 | 228 | 10th |
| 2022 | European Le Mans Series - LMP2 | Algarve Pro Racing | 6 | 0 | 0 | 0 | 0 | 7 | 21st |
| 2022 | Euroformula Open Championship | Drivex School | 3 | 0 | 0 | 0 | 0 | 23 | 13th |
| 2023 | GT World Challenge Europe Endurance Cup | GetSpeed | 4 | 0 | 0 | 0 | 0 | 0 | NC |
| 2024 | GT World Challenge Australia - Pro-Am | Team BRM | 10 | 2 | 0 | 0 | 3 | 116 | 5th |
| 2025 | GT World Challenge Australia - Pro-Am | Team BRM | 10 | 2 | 0 | 0 | 2 | 78 | 8th |
| 2026 | GT World Challenge Australia - Pro-Am | Team BRM | 6 | 1 | 2 | 0 | 2 | 82* | 8th* |

^{†} As Peroni was a guest driver, he was ineligible for points.
^{‡} Peroni was ineligible for points from the second round onwards.
^{*} Season still in progress.

=== Complete Italian F4 Championship results ===
(key) (Races in bold indicate pole position) (Races in italics indicate fastest lap)

| Year | Team | 1 | 2 | 3 | 4 | 5 | 6 | 7 | 8 | 9 | 10 | 11 | 12 | 13 | 14 | 15 | 16 | 17 | 18 | 19 | 20 | 21 | DC | Points |
|---|---|---|---|---|---|---|---|---|---|---|---|---|---|---|---|---|---|---|---|---|---|---|---|---|
| 2015 | Torino Squadra Corse | VLL; 1; 20 | VLL; 2; 9 | VLL; 3; 23† | MNZ; 1; 19 | MNZ; 2; 16 | MNZ; 3 Ret | IMO1; 1; 14 | IMO1; 2; 7 | IMO1; 3 Ret | MUG; 1; 22 | MUG; 2; 19 | MUG; 3; 12 | ADR; 1; 12 | ADR; 2 Ret | ADR; 3; 11 | IMO2; 1; 8 | IMO2; 2; 2 | IMO2; 3; 6 | MIS; 1; 2 | MIS; 2; 18 | MIS; 3; 15 | 14th | 43 |

=== Complete V de V Challenge Monoplace results ===
(key) (Races in bold indicate pole position) (Races in italics indicate fastest lap)

| Year | Team | 1 | 2 | 3 | 4 | 5 | 6 | 7 | 8 | 9 | 10 | 11 | 12 | 13 | 14 | 15 | 16 | 17 | 18 | 19 | 20 | 21 | DC | Points |
|---|---|---|---|---|---|---|---|---|---|---|---|---|---|---|---|---|---|---|---|---|---|---|---|---|
| 2016 | TS Corse | CAT; 1; 1 | CAT; 2; 1 | **CAT**; **3**; 2 | BUG; 1; 2 | BUG; 2; 10 | BUG; 3; 1 | LEC; 1; 1 | LEC; 2; 5 | LEC; 3; 3 | **ALC**; **1**; 1 | **ALC**; **2**; 2 | **ALC**; **3**; 1 | **MUG**; **1**; 1 | MUG; 2; 1 | **MUG**; **3**; 2 | **MAG**; **1**; 1 | **MAG**; **2**; 1 | **MAG**; **3**; 1 | **EST**; **1**; 1 | EST; 2; 1 | **EST**; **3**; 1 | 1st | 947 |

=== Complete Formula Renault Eurocup results ===
(key) (Races in bold indicate pole position) (Races in italics indicate fastest lap)

| Year | Team | 1 | 2 | 3 | 4 | 5 | 6 | 7 | 8 | 9 | 10 | 11 | 12 | 13 | 14 | 15 | 16 | 17 | 18 | 19 | 20 | 21 | 22 | 23 | Pos | Points |
|---|---|---|---|---|---|---|---|---|---|---|---|---|---|---|---|---|---|---|---|---|---|---|---|---|---|---|
| 2016 | TS Corse | ALC; 1 | ALC; 2 | ALC; 3 | MON; 1 | MNZ; 1 | MNZ; 2 | MNZ; 1 | RBR; 1 | RBR; 2 | LEC; 1 | LEC; 2 | SPA; 1 | SPA; 2 | EST; 1; 4 | EST; 2; 18 | | | | | | | | | NC† | 0 |
| 2017 | Fortec Motorsports | MNZ; 1; 6 | MNZ; 2 Ret | SIL; 1; 6 | SIL; 2; 21 | PAU; 1; 5 | **PAU**; **2**; 1 | MON; 1; 6 | MON; 2; 6 | HUN; 1 Ret | HUN; 2; 12 | HUN; 3; 19 | NÜR; 1; 13 | NÜR; 2; 15 | RBR; 1; 14 | RBR; 2; 12 | LEC; 1; 24 | LEC; 2 Ret | SPA; 1; 15 | SPA; 2; 16 | SPA; 3; 15 | CAT; 1; 18 | CAT; 2; 11 | CAT; 3; 8 | 10th | 72 |
| 2018 | MP Motorsport | LEC; 1 Ret | LEC; 2; 7 | MNZ; 1; 5 | MNZ; 2 Ret | SIL; 1 Ret | SIL; 2; 15 | **MON**; **1**; 1 | MON; 2; 2 | RBR; 1; 12 | RBR; 2; 7 | SPA; 1 Ret | SPA; 2; 25 | HUN; 1; 13 | HUN; 2; 5 | NÜR; 1; 9 | NÜR; 2; 9 | HOC; 1; 6 | HOC; 2 Ret | CAT; 1; 9 | CAT; 2; 14 | | | | 9th | 89 |

^{†} As Peroni was a guest driver, he was ineligible for points.

=== Complete Formula Renault NEC results ===
(key) (Races in bold indicate pole position) (Races in italics indicate fastest lap)

| Year | Entrant | 1 | 2 | 3 | 4 | 5 | 6 | 7 | 8 | 9 | 10 | 11 | 12 | DC | Points |
|---|---|---|---|---|---|---|---|---|---|---|---|---|---|---|---|
| 2017 | Fortec Motorsports | MNZ; 1 | MNZ; 2 | ASS; 1 | ASS; 2 | NÜR; 1 | NÜR; 2 | SPA; 1; 15 | SPA; 2; 16 | SPA; 3; 15 | HOC; 1 | HOC; 2 | | NC† | 0 |
| 2018 | MP Motorsport | PAU; 1; 1 | **PAU**; **2**; 1 | MNZ; 1 | MNZ; 2 | SPA; 1 Ret | SPA; 2; 25 | HUN; 1; 13 | HUN; 2; 5 | NÜR; 1; 9 | NÜR; 2; 9 | HOC; 1; 6 | HOC; 2 Ret | 7th | 60 |

† As Peroni was a guest driver, he was ineligible for points

=== Complete FIA Formula 3 Championship results ===
(key) (Races in bold indicate pole position; races in italics indicate points for the fastest lap of top ten finishers)

| Year | Entrant | 1 | 2 | 3 | 4 | 5 | 6 | 7 | 8 | 9 | 10 | 11 | 12 | 13 | 14 | 15 | 16 | 17 | 18 | DC | Points |
|---|---|---|---|---|---|---|---|---|---|---|---|---|---|---|---|---|---|---|---|---|---|
| 2019 | Campos Racing | CAT; FEA; 12 | CAT; SPR; 24 | LEC; FEA; 8 | LEC; SPR; 14 | RBR; FEA; 21 | RBR; SPR; Ret | SIL; FEA; 10 | SIL; SPR; Ret | HUN; FEA; 26^{1} | HUN; SPR; 16 | SPA; FEA; Ret | SPA; SPR; 15 | MNZ; FEA; Ret | MNZ; SPR; DNS | SOC; FEA | SOC; SPR | | | 20th | 5 |
| 2020 | Campos Racing | RBR; FEA; 3 | RBR; SPR; Ret | RBR; FEA; 11 | RBR; SPR; 11 | HUN; FEA; 7 | HUN; SPR; 10 | SIL; FEA; 6 | SIL; SPR; 3 | SIL; FEA; 14 | SIL; SPR; 24 | CAT; FEA; 8 | CAT; SPR; 2 | SPA; FEA; 14 | SPA; SPR; 21 | MNZ; FEA; 16 | MNZ; SPR; 5 | MUG; FEA; 20 | MUG; SPR; 13 | 10th | 64 |

^{*}^1 - 10 second time penalty for avoidable contact dropping Peroni from 13th to 26th.

=== American open-wheel racing results ===
(key)

==== Indy Lights ====
| Year | Team | 1 | 2 | 3 | 4 | 5 | 6 | 7 | 8 | 9 | 10 | 11 | 12 | 13 | 14 | 15 | 16 | 17 | 18 | 19 | 20 | Rank | Points |
|---|---|---|---|---|---|---|---|---|---|---|---|---|---|---|---|---|---|---|---|---|---|---|---|
| 2021 | Carlin | ALA; 5 | ALA; 6 | STP; 5 | STP; 8 | IMS; 5 | IMS; 3 | DET; 4 | DET; 13 | RDA; 13 | RDA; 4 | MOH; 9 | MOH; 9 | GTW; 5 | GTW; 6 | POR | POR | LAG | LAG | MOH | MOH | 10th | 228 |

=== Complete Euroformula Open Championship results ===
(key) (Races in bold indicate pole position; races in italics indicate points for the fastest lap of top ten finishers)

| Year | Entrant | 1 | 2 | 3 | 4 | 5 | 6 | 7 | 8 | 9 | 10 | 11 | 12 | 13 | 14 | 15 | 16 | 17 | 18 | 19 | 20 | 21 | 22 | 23 | 24 | 25 | 26 | DC | Points |
|---|---|---|---|---|---|---|---|---|---|---|---|---|---|---|---|---|---|---|---|---|---|---|---|---|---|---|---|---|---|
| 2022 | Drivex School | POR; 1; 6 | POR; 2; 4 | POR; 3; 10 | PAU; 1 | PAU; 2 | LEC; 1 | LEC; 2 | LEC; 3 | SPA; 1 | SPA; 2 | SPA; 3 | HUN; 1 | HUN; 2 | HUN; 3 | IMO; 1 | IMO; 2 | IMO; 3 | RBR; 1 | RBR; 2 | RBR; 3 | MNZ; 1 | MNZ; 2 | MNZ; 3 | CAT; 1 | CAT; 2 | CAT; 3 | 13th | 23 |

=== Complete European Le Mans Series results ===
(key) (Races in bold indicate pole position; results in italics indicate fastest lap)

| Year | Entrant | Class | Chassis | Engine | 1 | 2 | 3 | 4 | 5 | 6 | Rank | Points |
|---|---|---|---|---|---|---|---|---|---|---|---|---|
| 2022 | Algarve Pro Racing | LMP2 | Oreca 07 | Gibson GK428 4.2 L V8 | LEC; 17 | IMO; 15 | MNZ; 9 | CAT; 8 | SPA; 10 | ALG; Ret | 21st | 7 |
| 2022 | Algarve Pro Racing | Pro-Am Cup | Oreca 07 | Gibson GK428 4.2 L V8 | 7 | 6 | 3 | 3 | 3 | Ret | 6th | 59 |

=== Complete GT World Challenge Europe results ===
==== GT World Challenge Europe Endurance Cup ====
(Races in bold indicate pole position) (Races in italics indicate fastest lap)

| Year | Team | Car | Class | 1 | 2 | 3 | 4 | 5 | 6 | 7 | Pos. | Points |
|---|---|---|---|---|---|---|---|---|---|---|---|---|
| 2023 | GetSpeed Performance | Mercedes-AMG GT3 Evo | Bronze | MNZ; Ret | LEC; Ret | SPA; 6H; 54 | SPA; 12H; 40 | SPA; 24H; 32 | NÜR; 50 | CAT | 35th | 2 |

=== Complete GT World Challenge Australia results ===
(key) (Races in bold indicate pole position) (Races in italics indicate fastest lap)

| Year | Team | Car | Class | 1 | 2 | 3 | 4 | 5 | 6 | 7 | 8 | 9 | 10 | 11 | 12 | Pos. | Points |
|---|---|---|---|---|---|---|---|---|---|---|---|---|---|---|---|---|---|
| 2024 | Team BRM | Audi R8 LMS Evo II | Pro-Am | PHI1; 1; 9 | PHI1; 2 Ret | BEN; 1; 7 | BEN; 2; 5 | QUE; 1; 1 | QUE; 2; 8 | PHI2; 1; 2 | PHI2; 2; 4 | BAT; 1; 4 | BAT; 2; 1 | | | 5th | 116 |
| 2025 | Team BRM | Audi R8 LMS Evo II | Pro-Am | PHI; 1; 7 | PHI; 2 Ret | SYD; 1; 7 | SYD; 2; 8 | QLD; 1 Ret | QLD; 2; 1 | SAN; 1; 9 | SAN; 2; 5 | BEN; 1; 1 | BEN; 2 Ret | HAM; 2 | HAM; 2 | 7th | 78 |
| 2026 | Team BRM | Audi R8 LMS Evo II | Pro-Am | PHI; 1 | PHI; 2 | BEN; 1 | BEN; 2 | QLD; 1; 5 | QLD; 2; 5 | **HID**; **1**; **1** | HID; 2; 7 | SYD; 1; 2 | **SYD**; **2**; **4** | ADL; 1 | ADL; 2 | 8th* | 82* |

=== Bathurst 12 Hour results ===
| Year | Team | Co-drivers | Car | Class | Laps | Position | Class pos. |
|---|---|---|---|---|---|---|---|
| 2026 | (Australia) Team BRM | (Australia) Steve Brooks (Australia) James Golding (Australia) Mark Rosser | Audi R8 LMS Evo II | Pro-Am | 148 | DNF | |

Sporting positions
| Preceded by David Droux | V de V Challenge Monoplace; Champion; 2016 | Succeeded by Gilles Heriau |
Awards and achievements
| Preceded by Harry Bates | Peter Brock Medal; 2020 | Succeeded by Brodie Kostecki (2023) |
