= Erwin Creed =

French racing driver (born 1980)

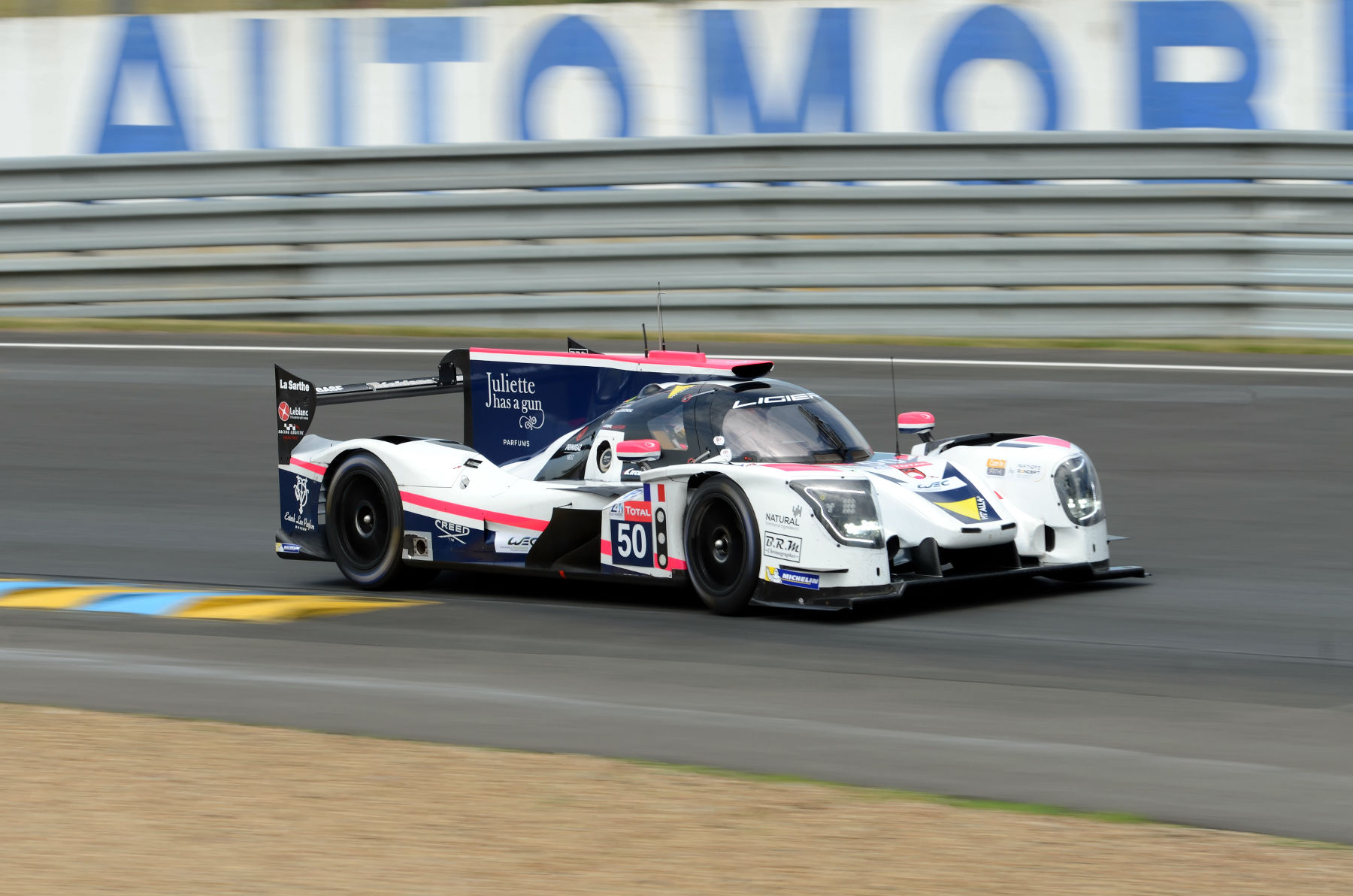
- Creed in 2018
- Nationality: (France) French
- Born: Erwin Henry Yves Johanes Creed; 15 December 1980 (age 45) Paris, France
- Categorisation: FIA Bronze

Erwin James Henry Yves Johanes Creed (born 15 December 1980) is a French perfumer and racing driver who competes in the European Endurance Prototype Cup for Cogemo Racing. A member of the Creed family, he is a race winner at LMP3 and NP02 level, and competed in LMP2 for Larbre Compétition in the 2018–19 FIA World Endurance Championship.

== Business ventures ==
Creed is the creative director and heir to the Creed perfume house, which was founded by James Henry Creed in 1760.

== Racing career ==
Creed made his car racing debut in 2012, competing in the V de V Challenge Endurance Moderne. After a brief spell in Mitjet 2L in 2013, Creed returned to racing two years later, competing in the V de V Challenge Monoplace for Formula Motorsport. Racing in all but two rounds, Creed took a best result of fourth at Magny-Cours to end the year 11th overall. In 2016, Creed continued with Formula Motorsport for his second season in the V de V Challenge Monoplace, taking his maiden series podium at Barcelona en route to a fifth-place points finish.

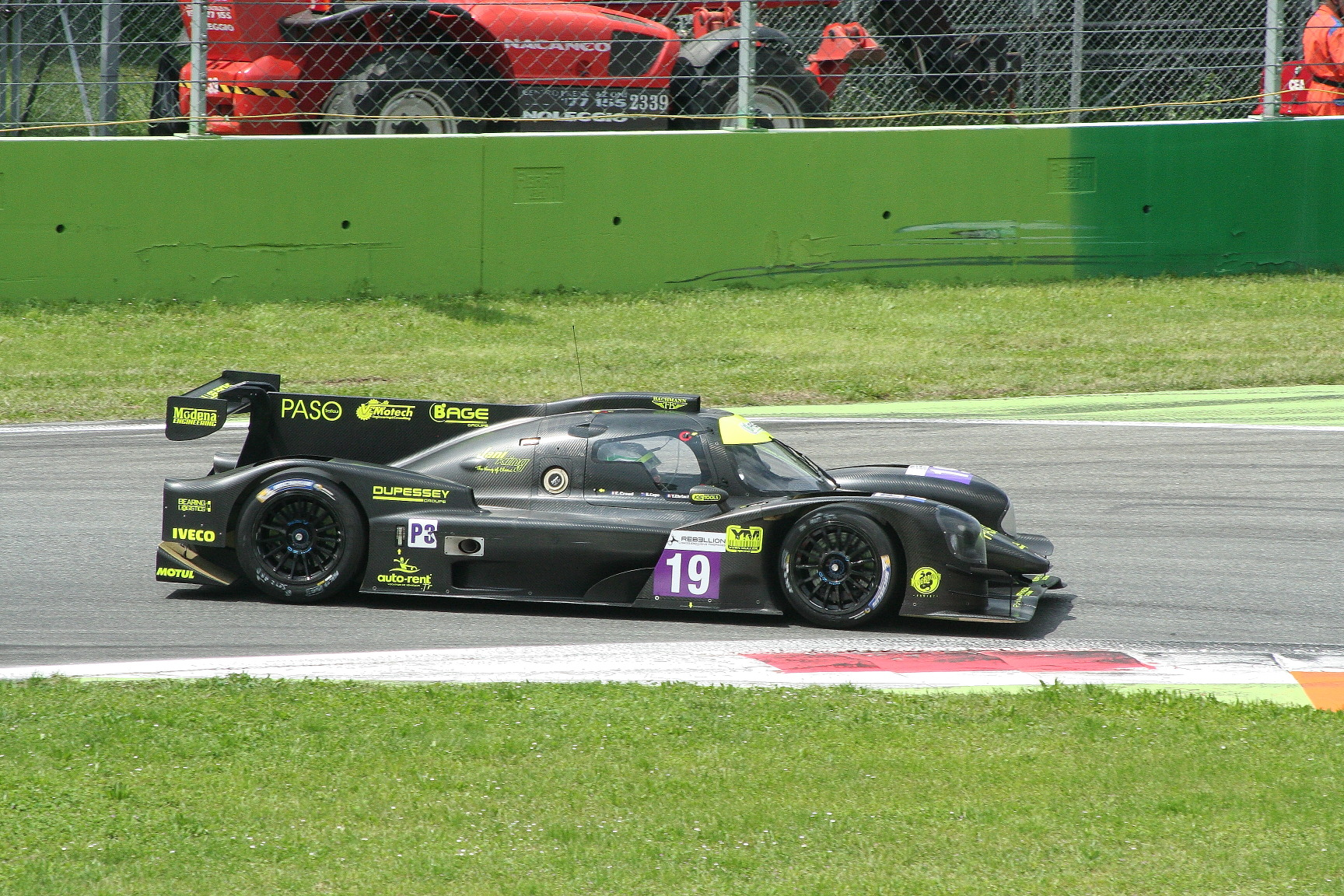
Creed's M.Racing LMP3, en route to victory at Monza in ELMS in 2017.

The following year, Creed continued with Formula Motorsport for another season in the V de V Challenge Monoplace, as well as finishing third in V de V's Endurance Challenge Scratch standings with TFT Racing. In parallel, Creed competed with M.Racing - YMR in the LMP3 class of the European Le Mans Series, taking a lone win at Monza alongside Ricky Capo, as well as a podium in Le Mans Cup's Road to Le Mans with Yann Ehrlacher. In 2018, Creed stepped up to LMP2 competition to compete in the 2018–19 FIA World Endurance Championship for Larbre Compétition alongside Romano Ricci and a rotating cast of drivers. Creed scored a best class result of fourth at the 2019 1000 Miles of Sebring, and finished 12th in both the 2018 and 2019 24 Hours of Le Mans. During both years, Creed made selected returns to the V de V and later Ultimate Cup Series' Monoplace division with Formula Motorsport, scoring a few podiums across both seasons.

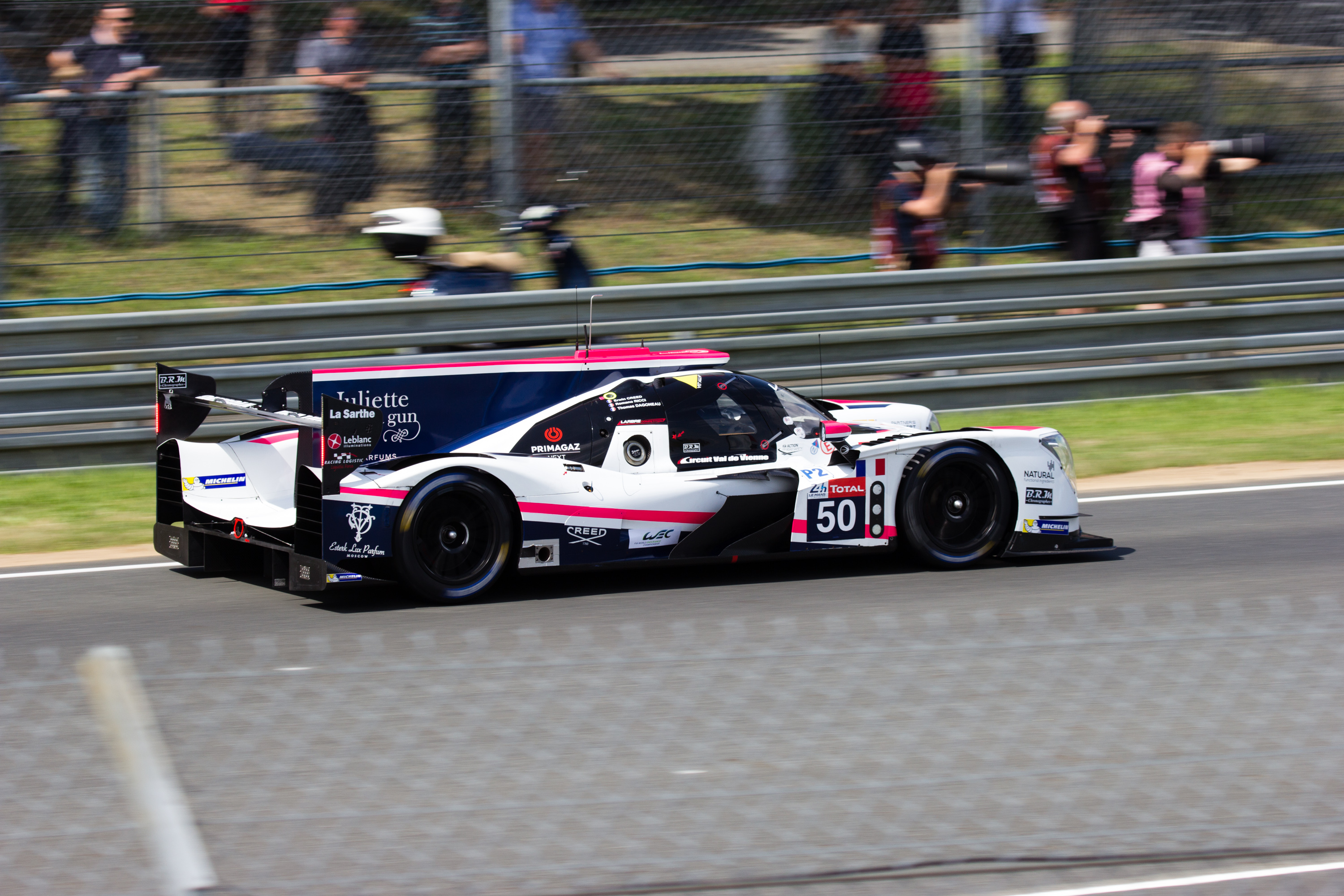
Creed made his WEC and 24 Hours of Le Mans debut in 2018 for Larbre in LMP2.

In 2020, Creed was set to race for Bentley-affiliated CMR in the GT World Challenge Europe Sprint Cup, but those plans were halted when the season was impacted by the COVID-19 pandemic. Returning to racing in 2021, Creed made one-off appearances in the LMP3 classes of the Le Mans Cup and European Le Mans Series for Mühlner Motorsport and Inter Europol Competition respectively. A cameo in the JS P4 class of the Ligier European Series in 2022 then ensued, before Creed joined Audi-fielding CSA Racing to compete in the GT World Challenge Europe Endurance Cup. Dabbling between the Bronze and Pro-Am classes with Arthur Rougier, Creed most notably took a podium in the latter class at the 24 Hours of Spa.

Creed then returned to full-time endurance prototype competition in 2024, joining ANS Motorsport to race in the NP02 class of the European Endurance Prototype Cup, but only managed 29th in points. In 2025, Creed raced at the Dubai 24 Hour for Team CMR, and also returned to the European Endurance Prototype Cup with Cogemo Racing. In his second season in the series, Creed scored wins at Algarve and Aragón en route to a fifth-place points finish, partnering Nico Prost and Marlon Hernandez. At the start of 2026, Creed reunited with Team CMR to compete at the Dubai 24 Hour, before continuing with Cogemo Racing for his third season in the European Endurance Prototype Cup, with Prost and Sebastián Álvarez.

== Racing record ==
=== Racing career summary ===
Season	Series	Team	Races	Wins	Poles	F/Laps	Podiums	Points	Position
2012	V de V Challenge Endurance Moderne – Proto		1					7.5	43rd
2013	Mitjet 2L		4						
2015	V de V Challenge Monoplace	Formula Motorsport	11	0	0	0	0	222	11th
2015	Challenge Endurance GT Tourisme V de V		1						
2016	V de V Challenge Monoplace	Formula Motorsport	21	0	0	0	1	632.5	5th
2016	Challenge Endurance GT Tourisme V de V		1						
2017	V de V Challenge Monoplace	Formula Motorsport	20	0	0	0	0	547.5	6th
2017	V de V Proto Endurance Challenge – Scratch	TFT Racing	7	0	0	0	3		**3rd**
2017	European Le Mans Series – LMP3	M.Racing - YMR	5	1	0	0	1	26	12th
2017	Le Mans Cup – LMP3	M.Racing - YMR	2	0	0	0	1	7	24th
2018	V de V Challenge Monoplace	Formula Motorsport	2	0	0	1	1	32	29th
2018	24 Hours of Le Mans – LMP2	Larbre Compétition	1	0	0	0	0	—N/a	12th
2018–19	FIA World Endurance Championship – LMP2	Larbre Compétition	8	0	0	0	0	85	5th
2019	Ultimate Cup Series Monoplace	Formula Motorsport	4	0	0	0	2	59	20th
2019	24 Hours of Le Mans – LMP2	Larbre Compétition	1	0	0	0	0	—N/a	12th
2021	Le Mans Cup – LMP3	Mühlner Motorsport	2	0	0	0	0	0.5	40th
2021	European Le Mans Series – LMP3	Inter Europol Competition	1	0	0	0	0	6	30th
2022	Ligier European Series – JS P4	Les Deux Arbres	2	0	0	0	1	15	15th
2023	Ultimate Cup Challenge Monoplace – F3R	Formula Motorsport	6	0	0	0	4	109	8th
2023	GT World Challenge Europe Endurance Cup	CSA Racing	4	0	0	0	0	0	NC
2023	GT World Challenge Europe Endurance Cup – Bronze	CSA Racing	2	0	0	0	0	0	NC
2023	GT World Challenge Europe Endurance Cup – Pro-Am	CSA Racing	2	0	0	0	1	36	11th
2023	Le Mans Cup – LMP3	M Racing	2	0	0	0	0	0	33rd
2024	European Endurance Prototype Cup – NP02	ANS Motorsport	6	0	0	0	0	13.5	29th
2025	Middle East Trophy – GTX	Team CMR	1	0	0	0	0	28	NC
2025	European Endurance Prototype Cup	Cogemo Racing	6	2	2	0	2	63	5th
2025–26	24H Series Middle East – GTX	Team CMR	1	0	0	0	0	42	NC
2026	Ultimate Winter Cup	Cogemo Racing	1						
2026	European Endurance Prototype Cup	Cogemo Racing							

* Season still in progress.

=== Complete European Le Mans Series results ===
(key) (Races in bold indicate pole position; results in italics indicate fastest lap)

Year	Entrant	Class	Chassis	Engine	1	2	3	4	5	6	Rank	Points
2017	M.Racing - YMR	LMP3	Norma M30	Nissan VK50VE 5.0 L V8	SIL; 10	MNZ; 1	RBR; Ret	LEC; Ret	SPA	ALG; Ret	12th	26
2021	Inter Europol Competition	LMP3	Ligier JS P320	Nissan VK56DE 5.6L V8	CAT	RBR	LEC	MNZ; 7	SPA	ALG	30th	6

=== Complete Le Mans Cup results ===
(key) (Races in bold indicate pole position; results in italics indicate fastest lap)

Year	Entrant	Class	Chassis	1	2	3	4	5	6	7	Rank	Points
2017	M.Racing - YMR	LMP3	Norma M30	MNZ	LMS; 1 Ret	LMS; 2; 3	RBR	LEC	SPA	POR	24th	7
2021	Mühlner Motorsport	LMP3	Duqueine M30 – D08	BAR; Ret	LEC; 12	MNZ	LMS; 1	LMS; 2	SPA	POR	40th	0.5
2023	M Racing	LMP3	Ligier JS P320	CAT	LMS; 1	LMS; 2	LEC	ARA; Ret	SPA; Ret	ALG	33rd	0

=== Complete FIA World Endurance Championship results ===
Year	Entrant	Class	Car	Engine	1	2	3	4	5	6	7	8	Rank	Points
2018–19	Larbre Compétition	LMP2	Ligier JS P217	Gibson GK428 4.2 L V8	SPA; 6	LMS; 6	SIL; 6	FUJ; 5	SHA; 6	SEB; 4	SPA; 7	LMS; 4	5th	85

=== Complete 24 Hours of Le Mans results ===
Year	Team	Co-Drivers	Car	Class	Laps	Pos.	Class Pos.
2018	(France) Larbre Compétition	(France) Romano Ricci (France) Thomas Dagoneau	Ligier JS P217-Gibson	LMP2	332	32nd	12th
2019	(France) Larbre Compétition	(France) Romano Ricci (United States) Nick Boulle	Ligier JS P217-Gibson	LMP2	355	17th	12th

=== Complete GT World Challenge Europe results ===
==== GT World Challenge Europe Endurance Cup ====
(key) (Races in bold indicate pole position) (Races in italics indicate fastest lap)

Year	Team	Car	Class	1	2	3	4	5	6	7	Pos.	Points
2023	CSA Racing	Audi R8 LMS Evo II	Bronze	MNZ; 37	LEC; 38						NC	0
2023	CSA Racing	Audi R8 LMS Evo II	Pro-Am			SPA; 6H; 37	SPA; 12H; 35	SPA; 24H; 35	NÜR; Ret	CAT	11th	36
