= David Droux =

Swiss racing driver (born 1997)

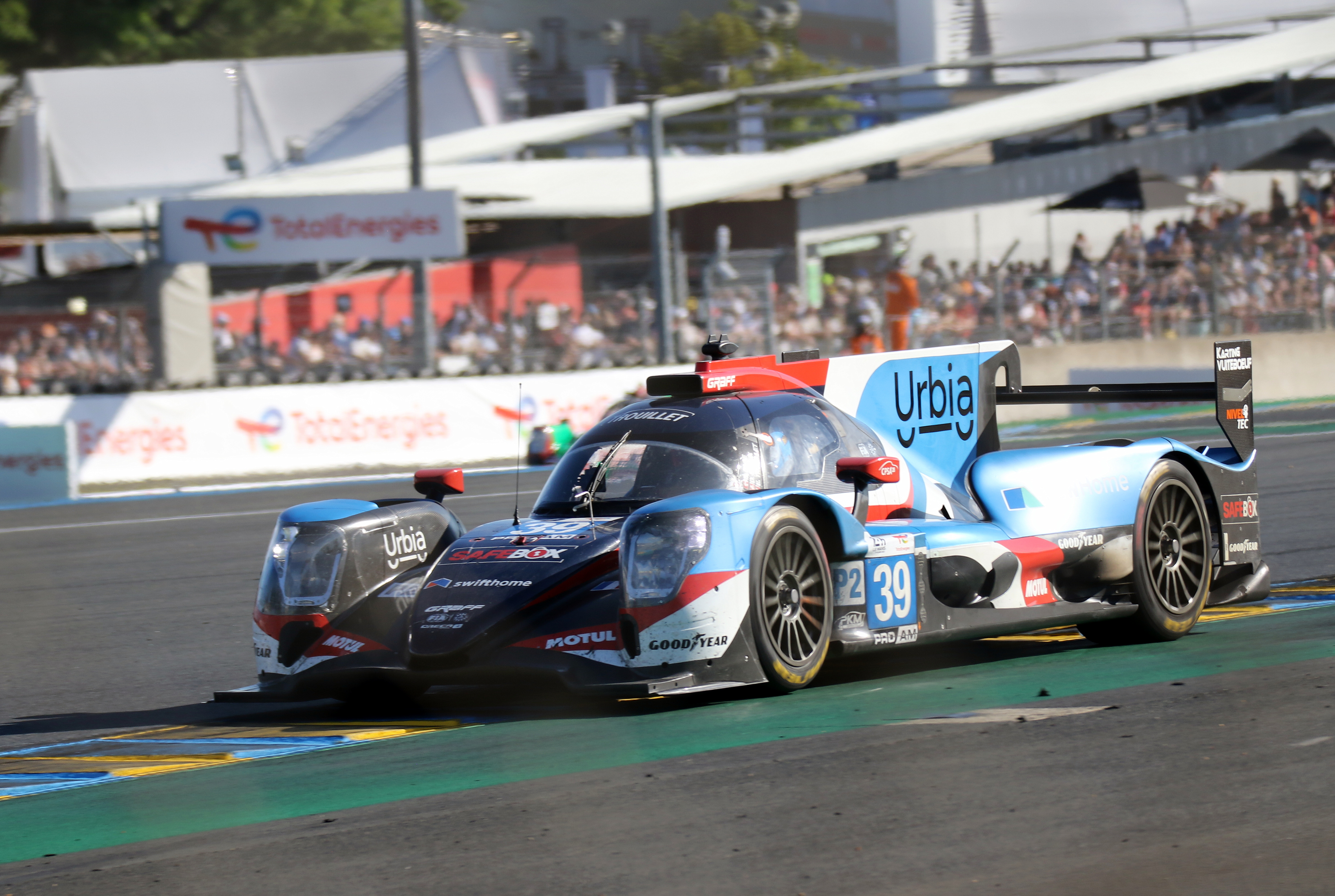
- Droux at the 2022 24 Hours of Le Mans
- Nationality: (Switzerland) Swiss
- Born: 19 February 1997 (age 29) Lajoux, Switzerland
- Categorisation: FIA Silver (until 2021); FIA Gold (2022–)

Championship titles
- 2024 2022 2015: Le Mans Cup – LMP3; Asian Le Mans Series – LMP2 Am; V de V Challenge Monoplace

David Droux (born 19 February 1997 in Lajoux) is a Swiss racing driver who last competed in Le Mans Cup for CLX Motorsport. He is the 2015 V de V Challenge Monoplace and 2024 Le Mans Cup – LMP3 champion.

== Early career ==
Stepping up to single-seaters in 2013, Droux competed in the last season of the Formula BMW Talent Cup, where he finished eighth in the standings at season's end.

In 2014, Droux joined the centrally-run French F4 Championship. Scoring his first points of the season with a fourth-place finish at Pau, Droux waited four rounds for his only podium in the series, finishing second behind Gjergj Haxhiu in the second Jerez race.

Remaining in single-seaters for 2015, Droux switched to the V de V Challenge Monoplace series, joining RC Formula. In the 17-race season, Droux won all but two races and clinched the title at the final round at Magny-Cours.

== Prototype career ==
=== LMP3 beginnings (2016–2021) ===
After leaving single-seaters on a full-time basis following his V de V title, Droux joined Duqueine Engineering to compete in the LMP3 class of the 2016 European Le Mans Series. Despite winning the 4 Hours of Red Bull Ring, Duqueine was given a four-second penalty for not respecting minimum pit stop times, giving the win to United Autosports and sending the Duqueine team back to second place. Droux was retained by Duqueine Engineering for the 2017 season. Following the team's switch to the Norma M30 from the third round of the season, Droux scored his first pole position in the series at Red Bull Ring and took another podium at the 4 Hours of Spa-Francorchamps.

Staying in the LMP3 category for 2018, Droux switched to Yvan Muller's M.Racing - YMR team for his third ELMS season. Despite starting off the season with a pole and a podium at Paul Ricard, Droux wasn't able to score another top five for the rest of the season, finishing tenth in the standings at season's end. In 2019, Droux joined Realteam Racing, partnering Esteban García. At Monza, Droux finished fourth, which would turn out to be his best finish of the season as he concluded the season seventh in the standings. In late 2019, Droux made his debut in the Asian Le Mans Series, staying in the LMP3 class and joining Graff Racing alongside Eric Trouillet and Sebastien Page. Droux scored his first LMP3 win in an ACO-sanctioned championship at the 4 Hours of Sepang.

Droux stayed with Realteam and Garcia for the 2020 season. In his fifth season in the category, Droux scored his first win in the series at Paul Ricard from pole and ended the season third in points. Ahead of the 2021 season, Droux returned to Graff Racing along with Sebastien Page and Eric Trouillet. Droux scored his only podium of the season at the Red Bull Ring, finishing third in wet conditions.

=== LMP2 debut and LMP3 return (2022–) ===
In early 2022 Droux stepped up to LMP2, staying with Graff Racing for the 2022 Asian Le Mans season. In the four-race season, Droux finished on the overall podium in every race and won the LMP2 Am title at season's end. Droux remained with Graff Racing for the European Le Mans Series. Only competing in the first three races of the season, Droux also made his maiden appearance at the 24 Hours of Le Mans, finishing seventh in LMP2 Pro-Am. Towards the end of the 2022 season, Droux returned to LMP3 competition, racing in the final two rounds of the Michelin Le Mans Cup, winning on his return at Spa.

Droux stayed in Le Mans Cup for 2023, joining Cool Racing, alongside Luis Sanjuan. At the second round of the season at Le Mans, Droux finished third in race one and took his only win of the season in race two. Staying with Cool Racing for the 2024 season, Droux was joined by Adrien Chila for his second full season in the series. Despite only taking one win, in the second round of the season at Paul Ricard, won the LMP3 title at the final round of the season, beating out R-ace GP by 5.5 points.

Ahead of the 2025 season, it was confirmed that Droux would stay with the newly-rebranded CLX Motorsport alongside Cédric Oltramare. In his third full-time season in the series, Droux won the season-opening race in Barcelona and finished second at Le Castellet en route to a sixth-place points finish. The following year, Droux returned to CLX Motorsport for his fourth full-time season in the Le Mans Cup, in which he took two points finishes and ended the season 25th in LMP3.

== Karting record ==
=== Karting career summary ===
Season	Series	Team	Position
2012	Trophée Oscar Petit – KZ125		11th

== Racing record ==
=== Racing career summary ===
Season	Series	Team	Races	Wins	Poles	F/Laps	Podiums	Points	Position
2013	Formula BMW Talent Cup	N/A	3	0	0	0	0	20	8th
2014	French F4 Championship	FFSA Academy	18	0	0	1	1	69	12th
2015	V de V Challenge Monoplace	RC Formula	17	15	15	16	16	660	**1st**
2015	Formula Renault 2.0 Northern European Cup	Mark Burdett Motorsport	3	0	0	0	0	17	32nd
2016	European Le Mans Series – LMP3	Duqueine Engineering	5	0	0	0	2	50	6th
2016	V de V Challenge Monoplace	RC Formula	6	2	2	0	5	0	NC
2017	European Le Mans Series – LMP3	Duqueine Engineering	6	0	1	0	1	37.5	8th
2017	V de V Endurance Series – LMP3	Duqueine Engineering	2	1	1	1	1	45	19th
2018	European Le Mans Series – LMP3	M.Racing - YMR	6	0	2	0	1	27.5	10th
2018	IMSA Prototype Challenge – LMP3	Forty 7 Motorsports	1	0	0	0	1	32	33rd
2019	European Le Mans Series – LMP3	Realteam Racing	6	0	1	1	0	31.5	7th
2019	European Endurance Prototype Cup – LMP3	Realteam Racing	4	1	1	3	2	64	10th
2019–20	Asian Le Mans Series – LMP3	Graff Racing	4	1	0	0	2	40	5th
2020	European Le Mans Series – LMP3	Realteam Racing	5	1	1	1	2	68	**3rd**
2020	Le Mans Cup – LMP3	Realteam Racing	2	0	0	1	0	0	NC
2021	European Le Mans Series – LMP3	Graff Racing	6	0	0	1	1	44	6th
2022	Asian Le Mans Series – LMP2	Graff Racing	4	0	0	0	4	69	**2nd**
2022	Asian Le Mans Series – LMP2 Am	Graff Racing	4	3	0	2	4	93	**1st**
2022	European Le Mans Series – LMP2 Pro-Am	Graff Racing	3	0	0	0	0	26	8th
2022	24 Hours of Le Mans – LMP2 Pro-Am	Graff Racing	1	0	0	0	0	—N/a	7th
2022	Le Mans Cup – LMP3	Graff Racing	2	1	0	0	1	31	9th
2023	Le Mans Cup – LMP3	Cool Racing	7	1	0	1	2	38	7th
2023	Endurance Prototype Challenge – NP02	Graff Racing	1	1	1	1	1	25	16th
2024	Le Mans Cup – LMP3	Cool Racing	7	1	0	0	2	73.5	**1st**
2024	European Endurance Prototype Cup – LMP3	Cool Racing	2	0	0	1	0	13	30th
2024	European Endurance Prototype Cup – NP02	Graff Racing	4	1	0	0	2	53	6th
2025	Prototype Winter Series	CLX Motorsport	6	0	0	1	5	126	**2nd**
2025	Le Mans Cup – LMP3	CLX Motorsport	7	1	0	1	2	57	6th
2025	European Endurance Prototype Cup	Graff Racing	6	0	0	0	2	42.5	8th
2026	Le Mans Cup – LMP3	CLX Motorsport	6	0	0	0	0	4	25th
2026	European Endurance Prototype Cup	Graff Racing							

=== Complete French F4 Championship results ===
(key) (Races in bold indicate pole position) (Races in italics indicate points for the fastest lap of top ten finishers)

Year	1	2	3	4	5	6	7	8	9	10	11	12	13	14	15	16	17	18	19	20	21	Rank	Points
2014	LMS; 1; 15	LMS; 2; 13	LMS; 3; 12	PAU; 1; 4	PAU; 2; 6	PAU; 3; 12	VDV; 1; 20†	VDV; 2; 10	VDV; 3 Ret	MAG; 1; 6	MAG; 2; 7	MAG; 3; 6	NOG; 1; 15	NOG; 2; 11	NOG; 3; 15	JER; 1; 7	JER; 2; 2	JER; 3; 10	LEC; 1	LEC; 2	LEC; 3	12th	69

=== Complete Formula Renault 2.0 NEC results ===
(key) (Races in bold indicate pole position) (Races in italics indicate fastest lap)

Year	Entrant	1	2	3	4	5	6	7	8	9	10	11	12	13	14	15	16	DC	Points
2015	Mark Burdett Motorsport	MNZ; 1	MNZ; 2	SIL; 1	SIL; 2	RBR; 1	RBR; 2	RBR; 3	SPA; 1	SPA; 2	ASS; 1	ASS; 2	NÜR; 1	NÜR; 2	HOC; 1; 12	HOC; 2; 13	HOC; 3 Ret	32nd	17

=== Complete European Le Mans Series results ===
Year	Team	Class	Car	Engine	1	2	3	4	5	6	Pos.	Points
2016	Duqueine Engineering	LMP3	Ligier JS P3	Nissan VK50VE 5.0 L V8	SIL	IMO; 4	RBR; 2	LEC; 2	SPA; Ret	EST; 9	6th	50
2017	Duqueine Engineering	LMP3	Ligier JS P3	Gibson GK428 4.2 L V8	SIL; 11	MNZ; 8					8th	37.5
2017	Duqueine Engineering	LMP3	Norma M30	Gibson GK428 4.2 L V8			**RBR**; 9	LEC; Ret	SPA; 2	ALG; 4	8th	37.5
2018	M.Racing - YMR	LMP3	Norma M30	Nissan VK50VE 5.0 L V8	**LEC**; 2	MNZ; 13	RBR; Ret	SIL; 8	SPA; 8‡	**ALG**; 10	10th	27.5
2019	Realteam Racing	LMP3	Norma M30	Nissan VK50VE 5.0 L V8	LEC; 7	MNZ; 4	CAT; 8	SIL; 11	**SPA**; 8	ALG; 8	7th	31.5
2020	Realteam Racing	LMP3	Ligier JS P320	Nissan VK56DE 5.6L V8	LEC; 4	SPA; Ret	**LEC**; 1	MNZ; 4	ALG; 2		3rd	55
2021	Graff Racing	LMP3	Ligier JS P320	Nissan VK56DE 5.6L V8	CAT; 12	RBR; 3	LEC; 7	MNZ; 13	SPA; 4	ALG; 6	6th	44
2022	Graff Racing	LMP2	Oreca 07	Gibson GK428 4.2 L V8	LEC; 16	IMO; 13	MNZ; 16	CAT	SPA	ALG	28th	0
2022	Graff Racing	Pro-Am Cup	Oreca 07	Gibson GK428 4.2 L V8	6	4	7				8th	26

=== Complete Asian Le Mans Series results ===
(key) (Races in bold indicate pole position) (Races in italics indicate fastest lap)

Year	Team	Class	Car	Engine	1	2	3	4	Pos.	Points
2019–20	Graff Racing	LMP3	Norma M30	Nissan VK50VE 5.0 L V8	SHA; 3	BEN; Ret	CHA; 1	SEP; Ret	5th	40
2022	Graff	LMP2 Am	Oreca 07	Gibson GK428 4.2 L V8	DUB; 1; 1	DUB; 2; 2	ABU; 1; 1	ABU; 2; 1	1st	93

=== Complete Le Mans Cup results ===
(key) (Races in bold indicate pole position; results in italics indicate fastest lap)

Year	Entrant	Class	Chassis	1	2	3	4	5	6	7	Rank	Points
2020	Realteam Racing	LMP3	Ligier JS P320	LEC1	SPA	LEC2	LMS; 1; 9	LMS; 2; 11	MNZ	ALG	NC	0
2022	Graff Racing	LMP3	Ligier JS P320	LEC	IMO	LMS; 1	LMS; 2	MNZ	SPA; 1	ALG; 7	9th	31
2023	Cool Racing	LMP3	Ligier JS P320	CAT; 20	LMS; 1; 3	LMS; 2; 1	LEC; 8	ARA; 7	SPA; 7	ALG; 20	7th	38
2024	Cool Racing	LMP3	Ligier JS P320	CAT; 5	LEC; 1	LMS; 1; 4	LMS; 2; 2	SPA; 9	MUG; 4	ALG; 4	1st	73.5
2025	CLX Motorsport	LMP3	Ligier JS P325	CAT; 1	LEC; 2	LMS; 1; 14	LMS; 2; 18	SPA; 9	SIL; 7	ALG; 7	6th	57
2026	CLX Motorsport	LMP3	Ligier JS P325	BAR; 9	LEC; 16	LMS; Ret	SPA; Ret	SIL; 9	POR; Ret		25th	4

^{*} Season still in progress.

=== Complete 24 Hours of Le Mans results ===
Year	Team	Co-Drivers	Car	Class	Laps	Pos.	Class Pos.
2022	(France) Graff Racing	(France) Eric Trouillet (Switzerland) Sébastien Page	Oreca 07-Gibson	LMP2	344	33rd	23rd
2022	(France) Graff Racing	(France) Eric Trouillet (Switzerland) Sébastien Page	Oreca 07-Gibson	LMP2 Pro-Am	344	33rd	7th

=== Complete Ultimate Cup Series results ===
(key) (Races in bold indicate pole position; results in italics indicate fastest lap)

Year	Entrant	Class	Chassis	1	2	3	4	5	6	Rank	Points
2023	Graff Racing	NP02	Nova Proto NP02	LEC1	NAV	HOC	EST	MAG	**LEC2**; 1	16th	25
2024	Graff Racing	NP02	Nova Proto NP02	LEC1; 1	ALG; 7	HOC; Ret		MAG; 2		6th	53
2024	Cool Racing	LMP3	Ligier JS P320				MUG; 25		LEC2; 11	13th	30
2025	Graff Racing	NP02	Nova Proto NP02	LEC1; 2	MUG; 9	ALG; 7	EST; 3	MAG; 20	LEC2; 10	8th	42.5

^{*} Season still in progress.
