= V de V Challenge Monoplace =

Single-seater racing series in Europe

- Category: Single seater
- Region: Europe
- Inaugural season: 2010
- Folded: 2018
- Last Drivers' champion: (Argentina) Nicolás Varrone
- Last Teams' champion: TS Corse
- Official website: Official website

The V de V Challenge Monoplace is a single-seater racing series active in Europe. The series was founded in 2010 set up by V de V Sports.

== History ==
The series was founded in 2010 and originally divided into three sub classes. The series saw the light as the Tatuus FR2000, which was abundant in Europe, was replaced by the Barazi-Epsilon FR2.0-10 in various Formula Renault series. The Tatuus FR2000 formed Class A along with 1990-2007 Formula 3 cars and Van Diemen Formula X cars. During the inaugural season only Tatuus FR2000 competed in Class A. Class B was open for the Tatuus FR1600, 1995-1999 Formula Renault cars, Formula Ford Zetec cars and Formula Renault Campus. Finally, Class C was open for Formula BMW and other single seaters with a motorbike engine.

The inaugural race was run at Circuit de Haute Saintonge near La Genétouze, Charente-Maritime. Experienced gentleman racer Philippe Haezebrouck won Class A and the overall championship. As of 2011 the Tatuus N.T07 was accepted in the series. The car previously raced in the International Formula Master between 2007 2007 and 2009. The car formed Class A along with older Formula 3 chassis. The Tatuus FR2000 was relegated into Class B along with Formula X. Grids grew in the sophomore season as the series visited Spain for the first time, at Jarama and Motorland Aragon. Young Simon Gachet won Class B and the overall championship, as it was still the most abundant car in the field. For 2012 the class rules were again amended with the Coloni CN1/98 Formula Nissan added to Class A. Hugo Blanchot won the overall championship scored ten podium finishes in fifteen races. For 2013 the Tatuus FR2000 was further relegated into Class C. As the Barazi-Epsilon FR2.0-10 was replaced by the Tatuus FR 2.0-13 the car was accepted in Class B. Tatuus Formula Abarth chassis were also added to Class C. John Filippi won the overall championship in a Tatuus N.T07 as the Baraz-Epsilon car became more prominent but was not as fast at the Tatuus.

As of 2014 also current spec Formula Renault cars were allowed by the V de V organisation, starting with the Tatuus FR 2.0-13. The car was allowed in Class A as Formula Master cars and Formula 3 cars were no longer allowed. Italian driver Daniele Cazzaniga won the series in 2014 with eight 2013 spec Formula Renault cars filling the top ten. The following season the class distribution remained the same with David Droux winning the overall championship.

== Champions ==
Year	Driver	Car
2010	(France) Philippe Haezebrouck	Tatuus FR2000
2011	(France) Simon Gachet	Tatuus FR2000
2012	(France) Hugo Blanchot	Tatuus FR2000
2013	(France) John Filippi	Tatuus N.T07
2014	(Italy) Daniele Cazzaniga	Tatuus FR 2.0-13
2015	(Switzerland) David Droux	Tatuus FR 2.0-13
2016	(Australia) Alex Peroni	Barazi-Epsilon FR2.0-10
2017	(France) Gilles Heriau	Barazi-Epsilon FR2.0-10
2018	(Argentina) Nicolás Varrone	Barazi-Epsilon FR2.0-10
