= 2016 V de V Challenge Monoplace =

The 2016 V de V Challenge Monoplace was a multi-event motor racing championship for open wheel, formula racing cars held across Europe. The championship features drivers competing in 2 litre Formula Renault single seat race cars that conform to the technical regulations for the championship. The 2016 season was the seventh V de V Challenge Monoplace season organized by the V de V Sports. The season began at Circuit de Barcelona-Catalunya on 19 March and finishes on 6 November at Estoril.

The season was dominated by TS Corse driver Alex Peroni who won 14 from 21 races. Gilles Hireau and Aleksey Chuklin won one races on their way to top three in the season standings. Grégoire Saucy, Erwin Creed, Antoine Robert, Nicolas Melin, Thomas Neubauer, David Droux, Gilles Magnus, Rinus van Kalmthout and Richard Verschoor were the other drivers who was able to finish on podium during the races.

== Teams and drivers ==
Entry list
Team	No.	Driver name	Chassis	Rounds
(Luxembourg) RC Formula	1	(France) Oscar Arcila	Tatuus FR 2.0 2013	1–3
(Luxembourg) RC Formula	1	(France) Antoine Robert	Tatuus FR 2.0 2013	4–7
(Luxembourg) RC Formula	6	(Switzerland) Mickael Grosso	Tatuus FR 2.0 2013	2
(Luxembourg) RC Formula	7	(France) Antoine Robert	Tatuus FR 2.0 2013	2–3
(Luxembourg) RC Formula	17	(Ukraine) Aleksey Chuklin	Tatuus FR 2.0 2013	1
(Luxembourg) RC Formula	26	(Switzerland) Grégoire Saucy	Tatuus FR 2.0 2013	1
(Luxembourg) RC Formula	33	(Luxembourg) Melissa Calvi	Tatuus FR 2.0 2013	1–2
(Luxembourg) RC Formula	74	(France) Karl Pedraza	Tatuus FR 2.0 2013	2–4
(Luxembourg) RC Formula	97	(Switzerland) David Droux	Tatuus FR 2.0 2013	3, 5
(France) Formula Motorsport	2	(France) Erwin Creed	Tatuus FR 2.0 2013	All
(France) Formula Motorsport	3	(France) Maxime Lebreton	Tatuus FR 2.0 2013	All
(France) Formula Motorsport	6	(France) Erik Attias	Tatuus FR 2.0 2013	1, 3, 6
(France) Formula Motorsport	10	(France) Nicolas Melin	Tatuus FR 2.0 2013	All
(France) Formula Motorsport	13	(France) Romano Ricci	Tatuus FR 2.0 2013	1, 3–5, 7
(France) Formula Motorsport	14	(France) Michel Piroird	Tatuus FR 2.0 2013	3
(France) Formula Motorsport	15	(France) Vincent Iogna	Tatuus FR 2.0 2013	3
(France) Formula Motorsport	24	(France) Thomas Neubauer	Tatuus FR 2.0 2013	4–6
(France) Formula Motorsport	37	(France) Gilles Heriau	Tatuus FR 2.0 2013	All
(Switzerland) Equipe Palmyr	4	(Switzerland) Christian Vaglio-Giors	Tatuus FR 2.0 2013	1
(Switzerland) Sports Promotion	4	(France) Sébastien Page	Tatuus FR 2.0 2013	3–4, 7
(Switzerland) Sports Promotion	7	(Switzerland) Esteban García	Tatuus FR 2.0 2013	1, 4, 7
(Switzerland) Sports Promotion	62	(Switzerland) Christophe Hurni	Tatuus FR 2.0 2013	All
(Switzerland) Sports Promotion	74	(Switzerland) Caryl Fritsche	Tatuus FR2000	3, 6
(Switzerland) Sports Promotion	77	(Switzerland) Luis Sanjuan	Barazi-Epsilon FR2.0–10	1, 3–4, 7
(Spain) By Speed Factory	5	(Spain) Jaime Fuster	Tatuus FR2000	2, 4–5, 7
(France) L Racing	9	(France) Teddy Chazot	Barazi-Epsilon FR2.0–10	3
(Italy) GSK Grand Prix	11	(Australia) Greg Holloway	Tatuus FR 2.0 2013	All
(Italy) GSK Grand Prix	26	(Switzerland) Grégoire Saucy	Tatuus FR 2.0 2013	2–7
(France) MB Motorsport	14	(France) William Westerloppe	Tatuus FR 2.0 2013	2, 6
(France) Zig Zag	16	(Belgium) Gilles Magnus	Tatuus FR 2.0 2013	3–4
(France) Zig Zag	54	(Madagascar) Jean-Christophe Peyre	Tatuus FR 2.0 2013	1, 3–4, 7
(France) Zig Zag	66	(France) Nicolas Matile	Barazi-Epsilon FR2.0–10	3–4, 7
(France) Zig Zag	69	(France) Christian Carlesi	Tatuus FR 2.0 2013	1, 3–4
(Netherlands) MP Motorsport	17	(Ukraine) Aleksey Chuklin	Tatuus FR 2.0 2013	2–7
(Netherlands) MP Motorsport	19	(Netherlands) Richard Verschoor	Tatuus FR 2.0 2013	2
(Netherlands) MP Motorsport	19	(Netherlands) Rinus van Kalmthout	Tatuus FR 2.0 2013	5, 7
(Poland) Inter Europol Competition	20	(United States) Robert Siska	Tatuus FR 2.0 2013	3, 5–6
(France) Avenir by ARTA	25	(United States) Howard Sklar	Tatuus FR 2.0 2013	2, 4, 6–7
(Italy) TS Corse	27	(Australia) Alex Peroni	Barazi-Epsilon FR2.0–10	All
(Italy) TS Corse	73	(Italy) Pietro Peccenini	Tatuus FR 2.0 2013	All
(France) Lamo Racing Car	31	(France) Jérome Sornicle	Tatuus FR 2.0 2013	2
(France) Lamo Racing Car	31	(France) Laurent Lamolinarie	Tatuus FR 2.0 2013	5
(France) Lamo Racing Car	53	(France) Gregory Choukroun	Tatuus FR2000	All
(France) Lamo Racing Car	88	(France) Eric Meriel	Tatuus FR2000	2
(France) Lamo Racing Car	99	(France) Pascal Brondeau	Tatuus FR2000	2
(France) Lycee Pro Nogaro	32	(France) Daniel Harout	Tatuus FR 2.0 2013	1
(France) Kennol Racing Team	36	(France) Adrien Hervouet	Barazi-Epsilon FR2.0–10	2
(France) Monster Racing	39	(France) Arnaud Choquet	Tatuus FR2000	2–3
(France) Monster Racing	43	(France) Mathieu Mopar	Tatuus FR2000	2–3
(Italy) Gabriele Rugin	45	(Italy) Gabriele Rugin	Tatuus FR 2.0 2013	5
(Belgium) Excelsior	45	(Belgium) Ghislain Cordeel	Tatuus FR 2.0 2013	7
(Switzerland) Heuri Rennwagen	46	(Switzerland) Walter Rykart	Tatuus FR 2.0 2013	1–3, 5–7
(France) Team One	68	(France) Alain Bucher	Tatuus FR 2.0 2013	3–7
(France) Team RV Competition	82	(France) Hugo Demorge	Tatuus FR 2.0 2013	3–4

== Race calendar and results ==
Round		Circuit	Date	Pole position	Fastest lap	Winning driver	Winning team
1	R1	(Spain) Circuit de Barcelona-Catalunya, Montmeló	19 March	(Ukraine) Aleksey Chuklin	(France) Oscar Arcila	(Australia) Alex Peroni	(Italy) TS Corse
1	R2	(Spain) Circuit de Barcelona-Catalunya, Montmeló	19 March	(Ukraine) Aleksey Chuklin	(Australia) Alex Peroni	(Australia) Alex Peroni	(Italy) TS Corse
1	R3	(Spain) Circuit de Barcelona-Catalunya, Montmeló	20 March	(Australia) Alex Peroni	(France) Oscar Arcila	(France) Oscar Arcila	(Luxembourg) RC Formula
2	R1	(France) Bugatti Circuit, Le Mans	23 April	(Netherlands) Richard Verschoor	(France) Oscar Arcila	(France) Oscar Arcila	(Luxembourg) RC Formula
2	R2	(France) Bugatti Circuit, Le Mans	23 April	(Netherlands) Richard Verschoor	(Netherlands) Richard Verschoor	(Netherlands) Richard Verschoor	(Netherlands) MP Motorsport
2	R3	(France) Bugatti Circuit, Le Mans	24 April	(Netherlands) Richard Verschoor	(Australia) Alex Peroni	(Australia) Alex Peroni	(Italy) TS Corse
3	R1	(France) Circuit Paul Ricard, Le Castellet	21 May	(Switzerland) Grégoire Saucy	(Australia) Alex Peroni	(Australia) Alex Peroni	(Italy) TS Corse
3	R2	(France) Circuit Paul Ricard, Le Castellet	22 May	(Switzerland) David Droux	(Australia) Alex Peroni	(Switzerland) David Droux	(Luxembourg) RC Formula
3	R3	(France) Circuit Paul Ricard, Le Castellet	22 May	(Switzerland) David Droux	(Australia) Alex Peroni	(Switzerland) David Droux	(Luxembourg) RC Formula
4	R1	(Spain) Ciudad del Motor de Aragón, Alcañiz	2 July	(Australia) Alex Peroni	(Australia) Alex Peroni	(Australia) Alex Peroni	(Italy) TS Corse
4	R2	(Spain) Ciudad del Motor de Aragón, Alcañiz	3 July	(Australia) Alex Peroni	(Ukraine) Aleksey Chuklin	(France) Gilles Heriau	(France) Formula Motorsport
4	R3	(Spain) Ciudad del Motor de Aragón, Alcañiz	3 July	(Australia) Alex Peroni	(Australia) Alex Peroni	(Australia) Alex Peroni	(Italy) TS Corse
5	R1	(Italy) Mugello Circuit, Mugello	10 September	(Australia) Alex Peroni	(Australia) Alex Peroni	(Australia) Alex Peroni	(Italy) TS Corse
5	R2	(Italy) Mugello Circuit, Mugello	10 September	(Switzerland) Grégoire Saucy	(Australia) Alex Peroni	(Australia) Alex Peroni	(Italy) TS Corse
5	R3	(Italy) Mugello Circuit, Mugello	11 September	(Australia) Alex Peroni	(Netherlands) Rinus van Kalmthout	(Ukraine) Aleksey Chuklin	(Netherlands) MP Motorsport
6	R1	(France) Circuit de Nevers Magny-Cours, Magny-Cours	7 October	(Australia) Alex Peroni	(France) Gilles Heriau	(Australia) Alex Peroni	(Italy) TS Corse
6	R2	(France) Circuit de Nevers Magny-Cours, Magny-Cours	8 October	(Australia) Alex Peroni	(Switzerland) Grégoire Saucy	(Australia) Alex Peroni	(Italy) TS Corse
6	R3	(France) Circuit de Nevers Magny-Cours, Magny-Cours	9 October	(Australia) Alex Peroni	(Australia) Alex Peroni	(Australia) Alex Peroni	(Italy) TS Corse
7	R1	(Portugal) Autódromo Fernanda Pires da Silva, Estoril	5 November	(Australia) Alex Peroni	(Belgium) Ghislain Cordeel	(Australia) Alex Peroni	(Italy) TS Corse
7	R2	(Portugal) Autódromo Fernanda Pires da Silva, Estoril	5 November	(Netherlands) Rinus van Kalmthout	(Australia) Alex Peroni	(Australia) Alex Peroni	(Italy) TS Corse
7	R3	(Portugal) Autódromo Fernanda Pires da Silva, Estoril	6 November	(Australia) Alex Peroni	(Australia) Alex Peroni	(Australia) Alex Peroni	(Italy) TS Corse

== Standings ==
Pos	Driver	CAT (Spain)			BUG (France)			LEC (France)			ALC (Spain)			MUG (Italy)			MAG (France)			EST (Portugal)			Pts
1	(Australia) Alex Peroni	1	1	**2**	2	10	1	1	5	3	**1**	**2**	**1**	**1**	1	**2**	**1**	**1**	**1**	**1**	1	**1**	947
2	(France) Gilles Heriau	6	3	5	5	2	5	3	2	2	2	1	2	6	6	4	4	6	6	5	5	4	791
3	(Ukraine) Aleksey Chuklin	**3**	**NC**	3	3	9	4				3	3	3	4	3	1	5	3	3	3	11	3	717
4	(Switzerland) Grégoire Saucy	10	7	4	9	17	7	**NC**	4	7	4	5	4	5	**5**	6	2	2	2	7	9	NC	661
5	(France) Erwin Creed	5	2	8	14	4	10	6	6	5	9	6	9	10	8	9	6	5	5	4	Ret	7	632.5
6	(France) Antoine Robert				8	5	6	8	9	28	6	7	6	7	7	8	7	NC	8	6	2	5	521.5
7	(Italy) Pietro Peccenini	9	4	6	7	11	9	7	17	27	12	9	22	12	13	11	11	9	11	9	21	11	458
8	(France) Maxime Lebreton	17	14	18	11	6	11	12	12	9	NC	10	10	11	10	10	9	7	9	12	7	9	439
9	(Switzerland) Christophe Hurni	12	5	7	15	8	26	17	8	10	11	Ret	12	13	11	12	10	8	10	8	10	13	437
10	(France) Nicolas Melin	4	Ret	9				10	7	8	8	NC	7	9	12	Ret				11	3	10	347.25
11	(France) Gregory Choukroun	18	9	13	21	13	25	14	18	12	13	13	13	17	NC	14	12	10	12	17	19	12	335
12	(France) Oscar Arcila	2	6	1	1	3	2	4	NC	6													324
13	(France) Thomas Neubauer										7	8	8	8	9	7	3	NC	4				283
14	(Australia) Greg Holloway	14	10	Ret	17	15	NC	16	16	17	Ret	Ret	Ret	19	18	18	21	14	18	14	16	19	239.75
15	(Switzerland) Walter Rykart	Ret	13	15	26	24	17	26	NC	20				18	16	17	14	NC	NC	16	17	17	204
15	(Switzerland) Luis Sanjuan	11	12	11				9	13	Ret	10	11	11							10	13	14	204
16	(France) Alain Bucher							25	25	24	19	18	19	21	19	NC	18	17	17	DSQ	Ret	21	176.5
17	(Madagascar) Jean-Christophe Peyre	16	11	16				30	24	22	17	15	17							18	15	20	160.5
18	(Switzerland) Esteban García	13	16	14							14	14	15							13	12	15	159
19	(Spain) Jaime Fuster				18	20	15				Ret	Ret	Ret	16	NC	Ret				DSQ	8	8	143.5
20	(United States) Robert Siska							21	22	14				20	17	16	20	16	15				127
21	(France) Sébastien Page							15	14	21	Ret	12	18							15	14	16	121.25
22	(United States) Howard Sklar				24	26	23				21	17	20				19	18	19	19	20	22	120.25
23	(France) Karl Pedraza				22	22	20	23	23	19	15	20	14										111.5
24	(France) Nicolas Matile							24	21	15	18	19	23							20	18	18	95.25
25	(France) Christian Carlesi	20	NC	17				27	26	23	20	16	21										85
Guest drivers ineligible for points
	(Switzerland) David Droux							2	**1**	**1**				3	2	5							0
	(Netherlands) Richard Verschoor				**4**	**1**	**3**																0
	(Netherlands) Rinus van Kalmthout													2	4	3				2	**4**	2	0
	(Belgium) Gilles Magnus							5	3	4	5	4	5										0
	(France) William Westerloppe				6	7	24										8	4	7				0
	(Belgium) Ghislain Cordeel																			DSQ	6	6	0
	(France) Romano Ricci	7	Ret	NC																			0
	(Luxembourg) Melissa Calvi	8	8	12	10	16	13																0
	(France) Adrien Hervouet				11	12	8																0
	(France) Daniel Harout	15	15	10																			0
	(France) Michel Piroird							18	10	Ret													0
	(France) Arnaud Choquet				16	19	12	13	11	11													0
	(Switzerland) Caryl Fritsche							20	20	13							13	11	13				0
	(France) Vincent Iogna							11	Ret	Ret													0
	(France) Eric Meriel				25	23	18										15	12	16				0
	(France) Laurent Lamolinarie													14	14	13							0
	(Switzerland) Mickael Grosso				13	14	22																0
	(France) Pascal Brondeau				19	NC	19										16	13	NC				0
	(France) Erik Attias	NC	Ret	DNS				19	19	16							17	15	14				0
	(France) Frederic Morihain				27	18	14																0
	(Italy) Gabriele Rugin													15	15	15							0
	(France) Hugo Demorge							22	15	18	16	NC	16										0
	(France) Jérome Sornicle				20	21	16																0
	(France) Mathieu Mopar				23	25	21	29	27	26													0
	(France) Teddy Chazot							27	28	25													0
	(Switzerland) Christian Vaglio-Giors	Ret	Ret	DNS																			0
Pos	Driver	CAT (Spain)			BUG (France)			LEC (France)			ALC (Spain)			MUG (Italy)			MAG (France)			EST (Portugal)			Pts

Colour	Result
Gold	Winner
Silver	Second place
Bronze	Third place
Green	Points classification
Blue	Non-points classification
Blue	Non-classified finish (NC)
Purple	Retired, not classified (Ret)
Red	Did not qualify (DNQ)
Red	Did not pre-qualify (DNPQ)
Black	Disqualified (DSQ)
White	Did not start (DNS)
White	Withdrew (WD)
White	Race cancelled (C)
Blank	Did not practice (DNP)
Blank	Did not arrive (DNA)
Blank	Excluded (EX)

**Bold** – Pole
Italics – Fastest Lap
