= Romain Favre =

French racing driver (born 2005)

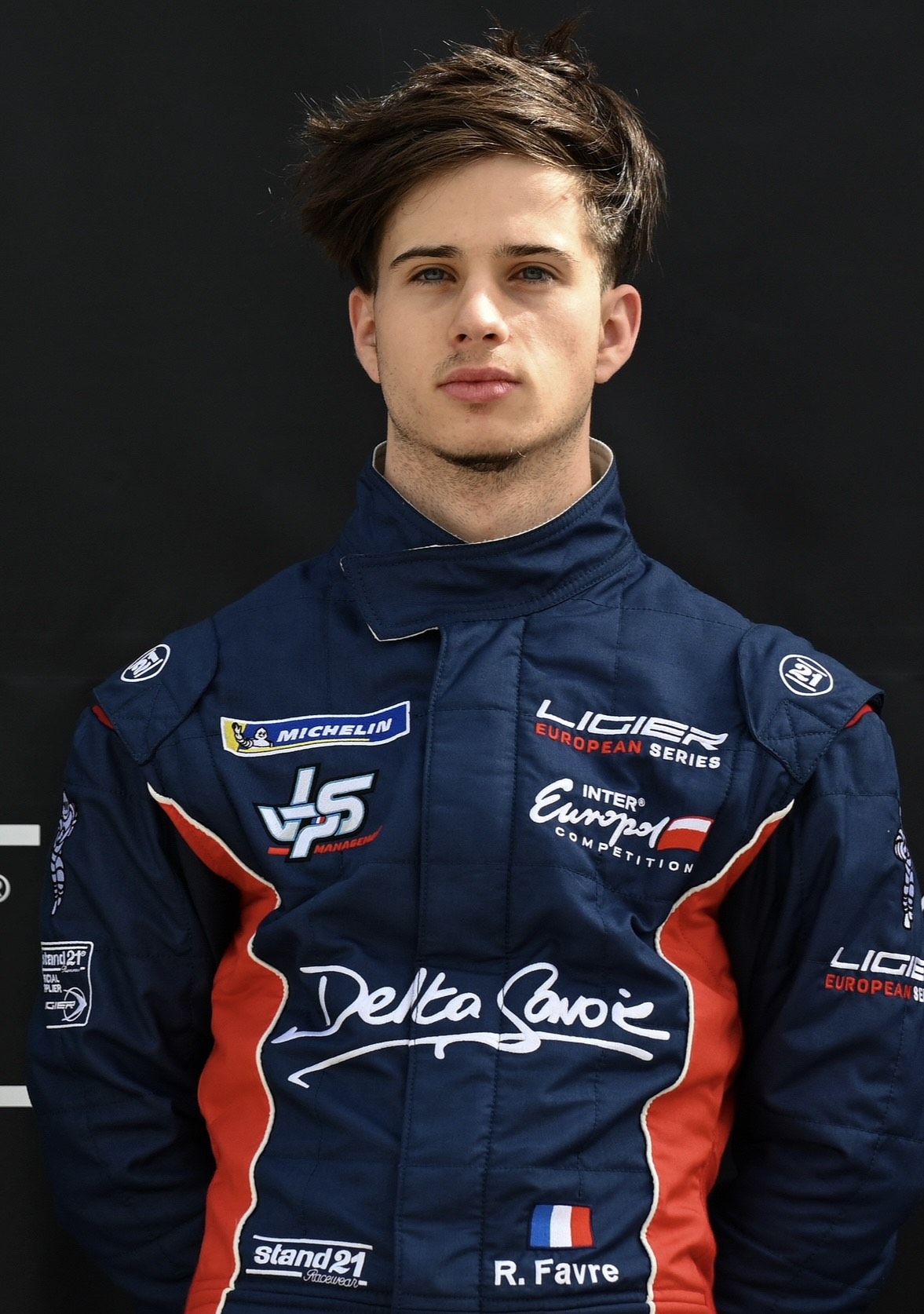
- Favre in 2024
- Nationality: (France) French
- Born: 22 June 2005 (age 21) Chambéry, France
- Categorisation: FIA Silver

Championship titles
- 2022: Trophée MitJet 2L France

Romain Favre (born 22 June 2005) is a French racing driver who last competed for DKR Engineering in the LMP3 class of the European Le Mans Series.

== Career ==
Favre made his car racing debut in 2022, competing in the Trophée MitJet 2L France for Matthieu Vaxivière and Aurélien Panis' VPS Racing. After taking his first two wins of the season at Nogaro, Favre took two more wins at Albi and one at Barcelona, as well as six other podiums to secure the series title at the season-ending Le Castellet round.

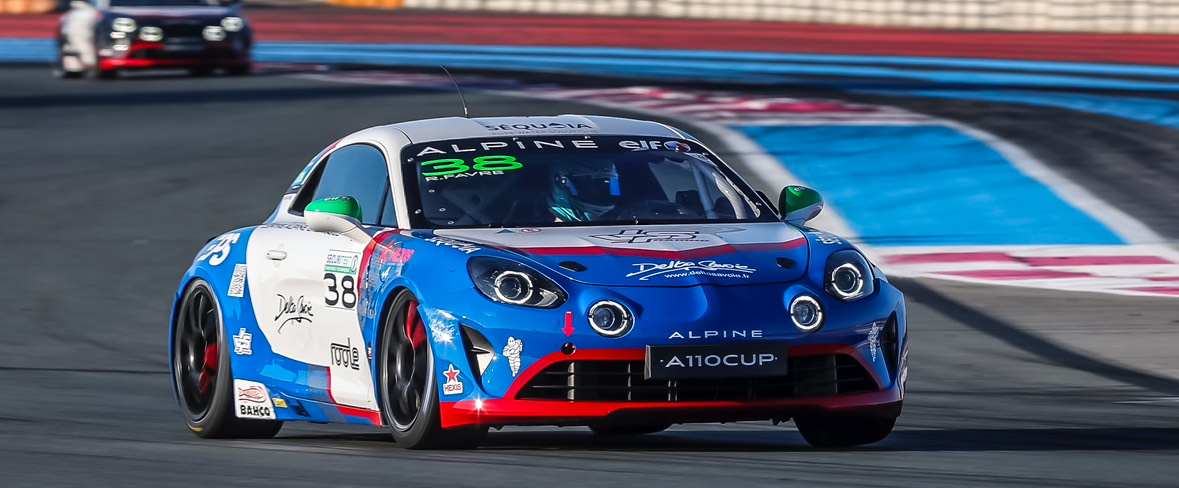
Favre's Alpine A110 Cup at Paul Ricard in 2023.

The following year, Favre remained with VPS Racing to switch to the Alpine Elf Europa Cup, scoring a lone win at Spa and three other podiums en route to a third-place points finish. During 2023, Favre also sampled Porsche Cup and LMP3 machinery in select appearances in the Ultimate Cup Series for 2B Autosport and Inter Europol Competition respectively. Towards the end of the year, Favre also participated in the European Le Mans Series rookie test at the Algarve International Circuit for Cool Racing's LMP3 squad.

In 2024, Favre remained with Inter Europol Competition, as he made his debut in the Ligier European Series, competing in the JS P4 class. Despite winning on debut at Barcelona, Favre was demoted to ninth post-race after failing to respect the minimum pit stop time, and had to wait until the following round at Le Castellet for his only win of the season. After finishing third at Le Mans and Spa, Favre left the series with two rounds remaining and ended the season sixth in the JS P4 standings. In parallel, Favre raced with 2B Autosport in the Porsche Cup class of the Ultimate Cup Series GT Endurance Cup, taking one win and finishing on the podium in every race he started to secure runner-up honours. During 2024, Favre also raced with Inter Europol in the last two rounds of the European Endurance Prototype Cup, winning both races in LMP3.

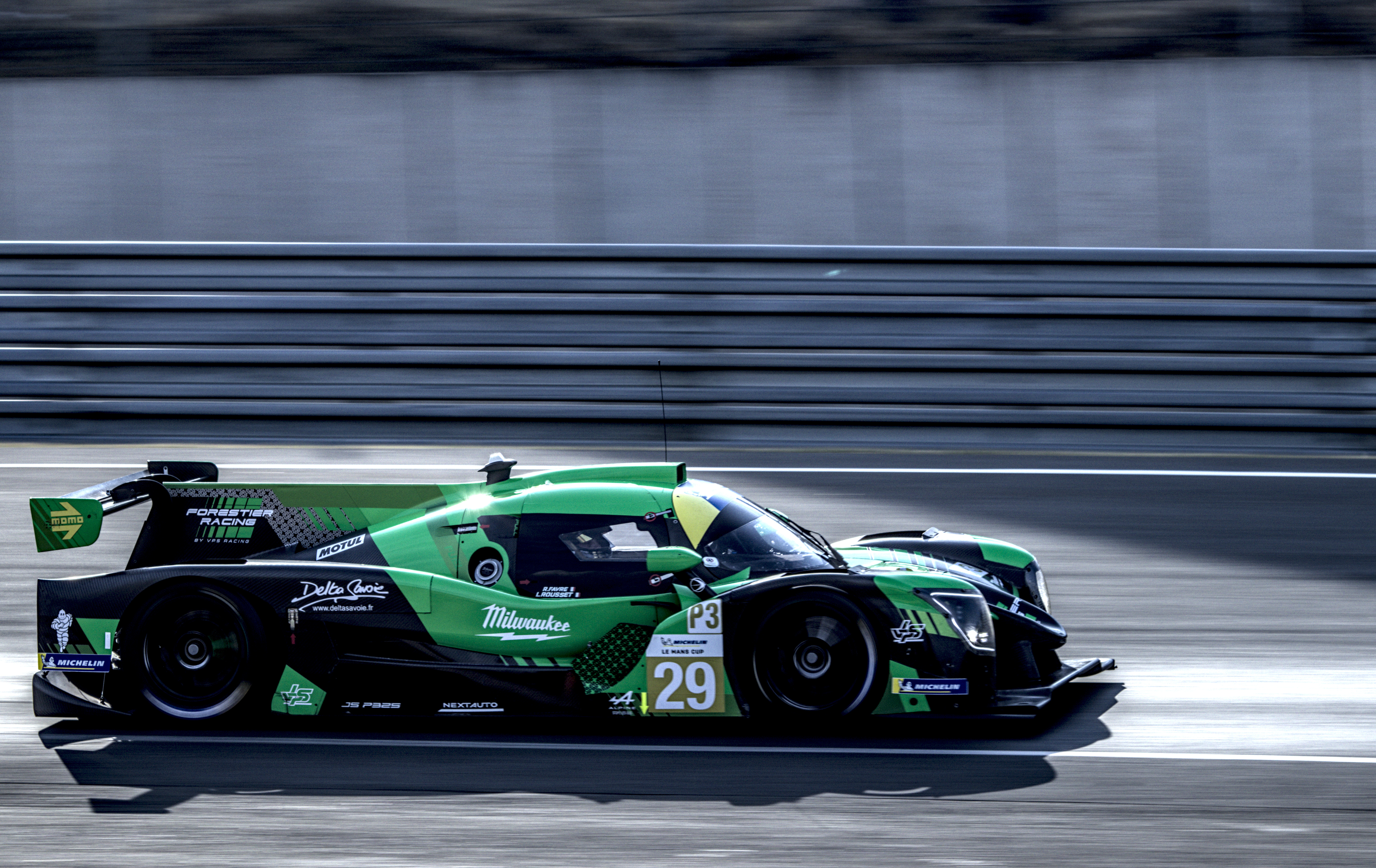
Favre racing for Forestier Racing by VPS in LMP3 at the 2025 Road to Le Mans.

Making the full-time switch to LMP3 for 2025, Favre joined Forestier Racing by VPS to race in the Le Mans Cup alongside Louis Rousset. In his only season in the series, Favre finished third on debut at Barcelona, before taking a season-best second at both Silverstone and Portimão to end the year third in the LMP3 standings. At the end of the year, Favre sampled LMP2 machinery in the ELMS rookie test for DKR Engineering.

Continuing down the LMP3 route the following year, Favre stepped up to the European Le Mans Series, partnering Wyatt Brichacek and Antti Rammo at DKR for his rookie year in the series. After finishing ninth on debut at Barcelona, Favre qualified on pole at Le Castellet, and took third in the race after an unscheduled pit stop to close the car's left-hand door took him out of the lead. Favre then ended the year with a third-place finish at Algarve to take eighth in the LMP3 standings.

== Karting record ==
=== Karting career summary ===
Season	Series	Team	Position
2016	Trophée Oscar Petit — Minime		9th
2016	National Series Karting — Minime	ATK GTS Karting	15th
2016	Championnat de France — Minime	GTS Karting	27th
2017	National Series Karting — Cadet	ATK GTS Karting	47th
2017	Coupe de France — Cadet	GTS Karting	NC
2018	National Series Karting — Cadet	RK Competition	14th
2018	Coupe de France — Cadet	RK Competition	26th
2018	Championnat de France — Cadet	RK Competition	18th
2019	National Series Karting — Nationale		48th
2019	Championnat de France — Nationale		90th
2019	WSK Open Cup — OK-J	RK Competition	92nd
2019	WSK Final Cup — OK-J	RK Competition	NC
2020	Championnat de Ligue Rhône-Alpes — Nationale		4th

== Racing record ==
=== Racing career summary ===
Season	Series	Team	Races	Wins	Poles	F/Laps	Podiums	Points	Position
2022	Trophée MitJet 2L France	VPS Racing	24	5	3	6	11	325.5	**1st**
2023	Alpine Elf Europa Cup	VPS Racing	12	1	1	0	4	123	**3rd**
2023	Ultimate Cup Series Endurance GT Touring Challenge – Porsche Cup	2B Autosport	1	0	0	0	1	15	20th
2023	Ultimate Cup Series Sprint GT Touring Challenge – Porsche Cup	2B Autosport	2	1	2	1	2	28	13th
2023	Ultimate Cup Series Endurance Prototype Challenge – LMP3	Inter Europol Competition	1	0	0	0	0	4	35th
2024	Ultimate Cup Series GT Endurance Cup – Porsche Cup	2B Autosport	5	1	1	1	5	94	**2nd**
2024	Ligier European Series – JS P4	Inter Europol Competition	7	1	0	1	3	77	6th
2024	Ultimate Cup Series European Endurance Prototype Cup – LMP3	Inter Europol Competition	2	2	1	1	2	50	7th
2025	Le Mans Cup – LMP3	Forestier Racing by VPS	7	0	0	0	3	70	**3rd**
2025	Ultimate Cup European Series GT Endurance Cup – Porsche Cup	2B Autosport	2	0	0	0	0		
2026	European Le Mans Series – LMP3	DKR Engineering	6	0	1	0	2	57	8th

=== Complete Ligier European Series results ===
(key) (Races in bold indicate pole position; results in italics indicate fastest lap)

Year	Entrant	Class	Chassis	1	2	3	4	5	6	7	8	9	10	11	Rank	Points
2024	Inter Europol Competition	JS P4	Ligier JS P4	CAT; 1; 9	CAT; 2; 5	LEC; 1; 1	LEC; 2 Ret	LMS; 3	SPA; 1; 3	SPA; 2; 5	MUG; 1 WD	MUG; 2 WD	ALG; 1	ALG; 2	6th	77

=== Complete Le Mans Cup results ===
(key) (Races in bold indicate pole position; results in italics indicate fastest lap)

Year	Entrant	Class	Chassis	1	2	3	4	5	6	7	Rank	Points
2025	Forestier Racing by VPS	LMP3	Ligier JS P325	CAT; 3	LEC; 13	LMS; 1; 5	LMS; 2; 11	SPA; 4	SIL; 2	ALG; 2	3rd	70

=== Complete European Le Mans Series results ===
(key) (Races in bold indicate pole position; results in italics indicate fastest lap)

Year	Entrant	Class	Chassis	Engine	1	2	3	4	5	6	Rank	Points
2026	DKR Engineering	LMP3	Ligier JS P325	Toyota V35A 3.5 L V6	CAT; 9	**LEC**; 3	IMO; 5	SPA; 6	SIL; 7	ALG; 3	8th	57
