= Amaury Bonduel =

Belgian racing driver (born 1999)

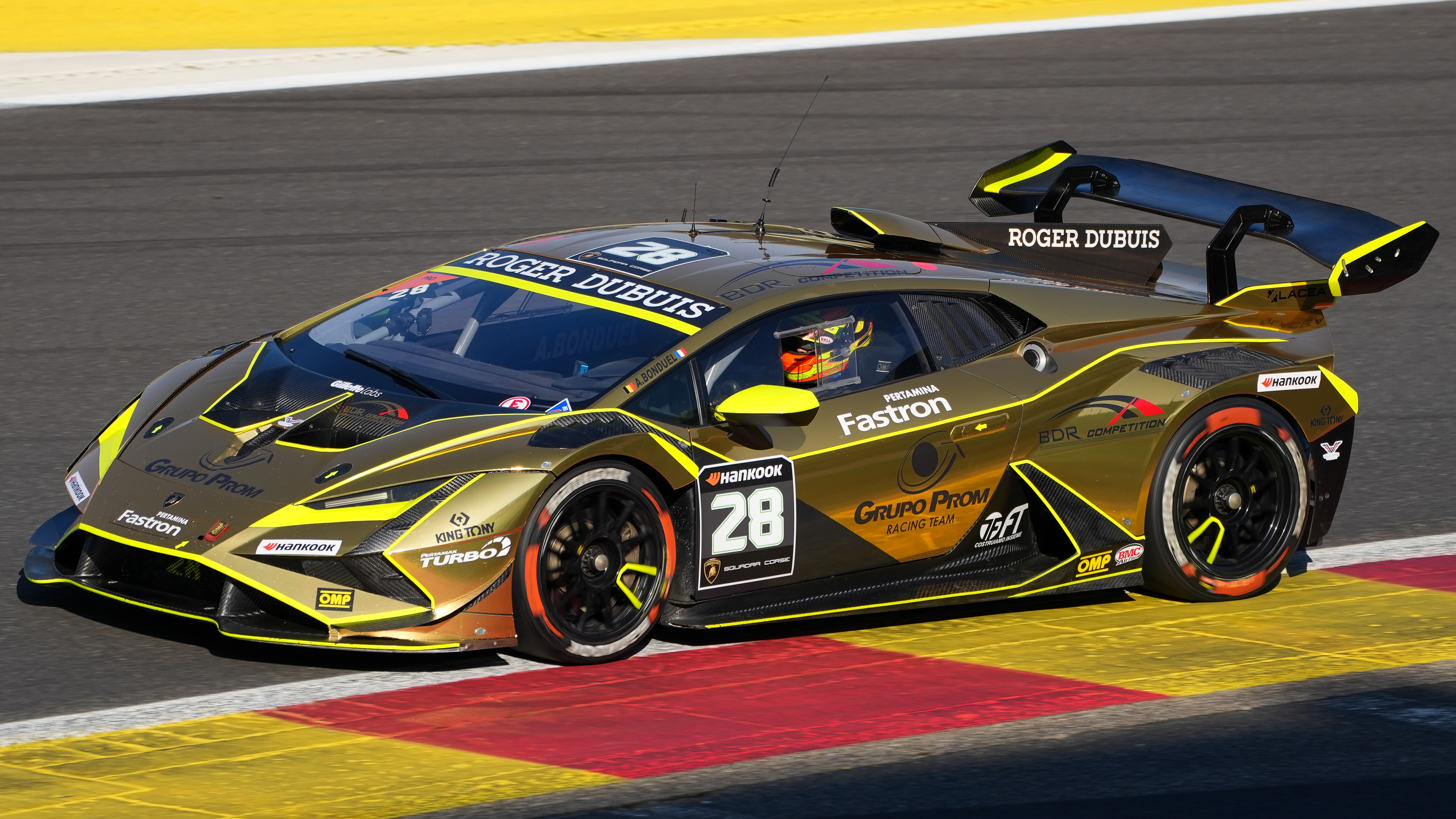
- Bonduel at Circuit de Spa-Francorchamps in 2024
- Nationality: Belgian
- Born: 3 March 1999 (age 27) Braine-l'Alleud, Wallonia

GP3 Series
- Categorisation: FIA Silver
- Years active: 2015
- Teams: Trident Racing
- Starts: 2
- Wins: 0
- Poles: 0
- Fastest laps: 0
- Best finish: 26th in 2015

Previous series
- 2015 2016 2017 2019: Formula Renault Eurocup; Formula 4 Italy; Dutch Supercar Challenge; V de V Challenge Monoplace

Championship titles
- 2019: V de V Challenge Monoplace

Amaury Bonduel (born 3 March 1999 in Braine-l'Alleud) is a racing driver from Belgium who last competed in the International GT Open for BDR Racing. He has previously competed in the GP3 Series and the Lamborghini Super Trofeo Europe.

== Racing record ==
=== Career summary ===
Season	Series	Team	Races	Wins	Poles	F/Laps	Podiums	Points	Position
2015	Formula Renault 2.0 Eurocup	JD Motorsport	7	0	0	0	0	0	21st
2015	GP3 Series	Trident Racing	2	0	0	0	0	0	26th
2016	Italian F4 Championship	GSK Grand Prix	3	0	0	0	0	4	26th
2017	GT & Prototype Challenge - GT Class	TransAm EuroRacing	2	0	0	0	0	0	NC
2017	24H Series - SPX	Vortex V8	2	0	0	0	1	10	6th
2019	Ultimate Cup Series - Monoplace	Lamo Racing	21	13	6	13	17	418	**1st**
2022	Ultimate Cup Series - Coupe Pièces Auto GT Hype Sprint - UGT3B	Bonduel Racing	10	7	8	8	7	160	**3rd**
2022	Lamborghini Super Trofeo Europe - Pro	BDR Competition	12	2	1	0	6	?	**2nd**
2023	Lamborghini Super Trofeo Europe - Pro	BDR Competition Grupo Prom							
2023	Ultimate Cup Series - Sprint GT Touring Challenge - 3A2	BDR Competition Grupo Prom	9	8	6	9	8	112	**2nd**
2023	Ultimate Cup Series Endurance GT Touring Challenge - 3A2	BDR Competition Grupo Prom	1	1	1	1	1	25	**1st**
2024	GT Winter Series - Cup4	BDR Competition by Grupo Prom							
2024	Lamborghini Super Trofeo Europe - Pro	BDR Competition by Grupo Prom	12	5	8	?	8	113.5	**1st**
2024	Ultimate Cup Series - GT Sprint Cup - UCS1	BDR Competition by Grupo Prom	4	4	4	4	4	32	4th
2024	International GT Open	Oregon Team	2	0	0	0	0	7	27th
2025	International GT Open	BDR Competition / BDR Grupo Prom Racing Team	9	0	0	0	0	1	44th
2025	Lamborghini Super Trofeo Europe - Pro	BDR Competition by Group Prom	5	0	1	0	2	27	12th
2026	European Endurance Prototype Cup	BDR Competition							

=== Complete Eurocup Formula Renault 2.0 results ===
(key) (Races in bold indicate pole position) (Races in italics indicate fastest lap)

Year	Entrant	1	2	3	4	5	6	7	8	9	10	11	12	13	14	15	16	17	Pos	Points
2015	JD Motorsport	ALC; 1; 22	ALC; 2; 22	ALC; 3; 11	SPA; 1; 18	SPA; 2; 25	HUN; 1; 18	HUN; 2; 16	SIL; 1	SIL; 2	SIL; 3	NÜR; 1	NÜR; 2	LMS; 1	LMS; 2	JER; 1	JER; 2	JER; 3	21st	0

=== Complete GP3 Series results ===
(key) (Races in bold indicate pole position) (Races in italics indicate fastest lap)

Year	Entrant	1	2	3	4	5	6	7	8	9	10	11	12	13	14	15	16	17	18	Pos	Points
2015	Trident	CAT; FEA	CAT; SPR	RBR; FEA	RBR; SPR	SIL; FEA	SIL; SPR	HUN; FEA	HUN; SPR	SPA; FEA	SPA; SPR	MNZ; FEA; 14	MNZ; SPR; 12	SOC; FEA	SOC; SPR	BHR; FEA	BHR; SPR	YMC; FEA	YMC; SPR	26th	0

=== Complete Italian F4 Championship results ===
(key) (Races in bold indicate pole position) (Races in italics indicate fastest lap)

Year	Entrant	1	2	3	4	5	6	7	8	9	10	11	12	13	14	15	16	17	18	19	20	21	22	23	Pos	Points
2016	GSK Grand Prix	MIS; 1; 14	MIS; 2; 8	MIS; 3	MIS; 4; 20	ADR; 1	ADR; 2	ADR; 3	ADR; 4	IMO1; 1	IMO1; 2	IMO1; 3	MUG; 1	MUG; 2	MUG; 3	VAL; 1	VAL; 2	VAL; 3	IMO2; 1	IMO2; 2	IMO2; 3	MNZ; 1	MNZ; 2	MNZ; 3	26th	4
