= 2023 Ultimate Cup Series =

Edition of motorsport championship

The 2023 Ultimate Cup Series was the fifth season of the Ultimate Cup Series. It began at Circuit Paul Ricard on 25 March and ended at the same venue on 26 November. The Ultimate Cup Series is a program comprising multiple endurance and sprint championships across different classes of motor racing.

== Calendar ==
The 2023 calendar was announced on 10 October 2022. The round at Misano World Circuit Marco Simoncelli was to be replaced by a round at the newly built Circuit de Mirecourt near Nancy in eastern France. Championship organizers were unable to finalize an agreement on the round, however, so in June, the venue was replaced by a round at Estoril.

Round	Circuit	Date
1	(France) Circuit Paul Ricard, Le Castellet	24–26 March
2	(Spain) Circuito de Navarra, Los Arcos	28–30 April
3	(Germany) Hockenheimring, Hockenheim	26–28 May
4	(Portugal) Circuito do Estoril, Estoril	8–10 September
5	(France) Circuit de Nevers Magny-Cours, Magny-Cours	27–29 October
6	(France) Circuit Paul Ricard, Le Castellet	24–26 November

== Endurance Prototype Challenge ==
The Endurance Prototype Challenge is open to LMP3, Nova Proto NP02s and Group CN cars.

=== Teams and drivers ===
Team	Chassis	Engine	No.	Drivers	U	Rounds
LMP3
(United Kingdom) Nielsen Racing	Duqueine M30 - D08	Nissan VK56DE 5.6 L V8	4	(United Kingdom) Matt Bell		1
(United Kingdom) Nielsen Racing	Duqueine M30 - D08	Nissan VK56DE 5.6 L V8	4	(United Kingdom) John Melsom		1
(Austria) Konrad Motorsport	Ligier JS P320	Nissan VK56DE 5.6 L V8	7	(Germany) Torsten Kratz		6
(Austria) Konrad Motorsport	Ligier JS P320	Nissan VK56DE 5.6 L V8	7	(United States) Danny Soufi		6
(France) Zosh Competition	Ligier JS P320	Nissan VK56DE 5.6 L V8	8	(France) Claude Rosati	**U**	1–3, 6
(France) Zosh Competition	Ligier JS P320	Nissan VK56DE 5.6 L V8	8	(France) Rodolphe Rosati	**U**	1–3, 6
(France) Zosh Competition	Ligier JS P320	Nissan VK56DE 5.6 L V8	10	(France) Jean René de Fournoux		1–3, 6
(France) Zosh Competition	Ligier JS P320	Nissan VK56DE 5.6 L V8	10	(France) Hugo Rosati		1–3, 6
(Poland) Team Virage	Ligier JS P320	Nissan VK56DE 5.6 L V8	14	(United Kingdom) George King		All
(Poland) Team Virage	Ligier JS P320	Nissan VK56DE 5.6 L V8	14	(Portugal) Manuel Espírito Santo		1, 3–6
(Poland) Team Virage	Ligier JS P320	Nissan VK56DE 5.6 L V8	14	Vyacheslav Gutak (Note: Gutak is Russian, but he competes as a neutral competitor as Russian national emblems were banned by the FIA due to the Russian invasion of Ukraine.)		1, 4–6
(Poland) Team Virage	Ligier JS P320	Nissan VK56DE 5.6 L V8	14	(Romania) Mihnea Ștefan		2–3
(Poland) Team Virage	Ligier JS P320	Nissan VK56DE 5.6 L V8	14	(Portugal) Bernardo Pinheiro		2
(Poland) Team Virage	Ligier JS P320	Nissan VK56DE 5.6 L V8	44	(Mexico) Diego de la Torre		6
(Poland) Team Virage	Ligier JS P320	Nissan VK56DE 5.6 L V8	44	(Algeria) Julien Gerbi		6
(Poland) Team Virage	Ligier JS P320	Nissan VK56DE 5.6 L V8	44	(Mexico) Raúl Guzmán		6
(Poland) Team Virage	Ligier JS P320	Nissan VK56DE 5.6 L V8	92	(Italy) Jacopo Faccioni		5–6
(Poland) Team Virage	Ligier JS P320	Nissan VK56DE 5.6 L V8	92	(United Kingdom) Jamie Falvey		5–6
(Poland) Team Virage	Ligier JS P320	Nissan VK56DE 5.6 L V8	92	(Portugal) Frederico Peters		5
(Poland) Team Virage	Ligier JS P320	Nissan VK56DE 5.6 L V8	92	(Switzerland) Axel Gnos		6
(Poland) Inter Europol Competition	Ligier JS P320	Nissan VK56DE 5.6 L V8	15	(United Kingdom) Chris Short		1, 6
(Poland) Inter Europol Competition	Ligier JS P320	Nissan VK56DE 5.6 L V8	15	(Canada) Daniel Ali		1
(Poland) Inter Europol Competition	Ligier JS P320	Nissan VK56DE 5.6 L V8	15	(United States) Bryson Morris		1
(Poland) Inter Europol Competition	Ligier JS P320	Nissan VK56DE 5.6 L V8	15	(France) Romain Favre		6
(Poland) Inter Europol Competition	Ligier JS P320	Nissan VK56DE 5.6 L V8	15	(Spain) Maximus Mayer		6
(Poland) Inter Europol Competition	Ligier JS P320	Nissan VK56DE 5.6 L V8	88	(Australia) John Corbett		6
(Poland) Inter Europol Competition	Ligier JS P320	Nissan VK56DE 5.6 L V8	88	(United Kingdom) James Winslow		6
(France) Graff Racing	Ligier JS P320	Nissan VK56DE 5.6 L V8	16	(Switzerland) Samir Ben		1
(France) Graff Racing	Ligier JS P320	Nissan VK56DE 5.6 L V8	16	(Switzerland) Loris Kyburz		1
(France) Graff Racing	Ligier JS P320	Nissan VK56DE 5.6 L V8	16	(Switzerland) Luis Sanjuan		1
(France) Graff Racing	Ligier JS P320	Nissan VK56DE 5.6 L V8	16	(Greece) Panagiotis Kaitatzis	**U**	6
(France) Graff Racing	Ligier JS P320	Nissan VK56DE 5.6 L V8	16	(Greece) Georgios Kolovos	**U**	6
(France) Graff Racing	Ligier JS P320	Nissan VK56DE 5.6 L V8	16	(France) Louis Rossi	**U**	6
(France) Graff Racing	Ligier JS P320	Nissan VK56DE 5.6 L V8	38	(Switzerland) Samir Ben		3
(France) Graff Racing	Ligier JS P320	Nissan VK56DE 5.6 L V8	38	(China) Haowen Luo		3
(France) Graff Racing	Ligier JS P320	Nissan VK56DE 5.6 L V8	38	(Switzerland) Loris Kyburz		3
(France) Graff Racing	Ligier JS P320	Nissan VK56DE 5.6 L V8	39	(France) Nicolas Chartier		3–4
(France) Graff Racing	Ligier JS P320	Nissan VK56DE 5.6 L V8	39	(France) Vincent Capillaire		3–4
(France) Graff Racing	Ligier JS P320	Nissan VK56DE 5.6 L V8	39	(Switzerland) Stephan Rupp		3–4
(France) Graff Racing	Ligier JS P320	Nissan VK56DE 5.6 L V8	65	(Australia) George Nakas		6
(France) Graff Racing	Ligier JS P320	Nissan VK56DE 5.6 L V8	65	(Australia) Fraser Ross		6
(France) Pegasus Racing	Ligier JS P320	Nissan VK56DE 5.6 L V8	23	(France) Thibault Ehrhart		1
(France) Pegasus Racing	Ligier JS P320	Nissan VK56DE 5.6 L V8	23	(France) Julien Schell		1
(Italy) TS Corse	Duqueine M30 - D08	Nissan VK56DE 5.6 L V8	27	(United Kingdom) Ayrton Simmons		All
(Italy) TS Corse	Duqueine M30 - D08	Nissan VK56DE 5.6 L V8	27	(United Kingdom) Georgi Dimitrov		1–2
(Italy) TS Corse	Duqueine M30 - D08	Nissan VK56DE 5.6 L V8	27	(Spain) Toni Forné		1
(Italy) TS Corse	Duqueine M30 - D08	Nissan VK56DE 5.6 L V8	27	(Canada) Jonathan Woolridge		2–3
(Italy) TS Corse	Duqueine M30 - D08	Nissan VK56DE 5.6 L V8	27	(Mexico) Ian Aguilera		3
(Italy) TS Corse	Duqueine M30 - D08	Nissan VK56DE 5.6 L V8	27	(Portugal) Zdeněk Chovanec		4
(Italy) TS Corse	Duqueine M30 - D08	Nissan VK56DE 5.6 L V8	27	(Mozambique) Pedro Perino		4
(Italy) TS Corse	Duqueine M30 - D08	Nissan VK56DE 5.6 L V8	27	(Italy) Gianluca Giraudi		5
(Italy) TS Corse	Duqueine M30 - D08	Nissan VK56DE 5.6 L V8	27	(Denmark) Theodor Jensen		6
(Italy) TS Corse	Duqueine M30 - D08	Nissan VK56DE 5.6 L V8	27	(Australia) Nathan Kumar		6
(Switzerland) Racing Spirit of Léman	Ligier JS P320	Nissan VK56DE 5.6 L V8	31	(France) Marius Fossard		6
(Switzerland) Racing Spirit of Léman	Ligier JS P320	Nissan VK56DE 5.6 L V8	31	(France) Jean-Ludovic Foubert		6
(United Kingdom) BHK Motorsport	Ligier JS P320	Nissan VK56DE 5.6 L V8	35	(Romania) Alex Cascatău		1
(United Kingdom) BHK Motorsport	Ligier JS P320	Nissan VK56DE 5.6 L V8	35	(Switzerland) Elia Sperandio		1
(United Kingdom) BHK Motorsport	Ligier JS P320	Nissan VK56DE 5.6 L V8	35	(France) Joël Roussel		1
(United Kingdom) BHK Motorsport	Duqueine M30 - D08	Nissan VK56DE 5.6 L V8	35	(Italy) Francesco Dracone		6
(United Kingdom) BHK Motorsport	Duqueine M30 - D08	Nissan VK56DE 5.6 L V8	35	(Netherlands) Beitske Visser		6
(Germany) Reiter Engineering	Ligier JS P320	Nissan VK56DE 5.6 L V8	57	(France) Vincent Capillaire		6
(Germany) Reiter Engineering	Ligier JS P320	Nissan VK56DE 5.6 L V8	57	(France) Nicolas Chartier		6
(Austria) MG Sound Speed Division	Ginetta G61-LT-P3	Nissan VK56DE 5.6 L V8	61	(Austria) Martin Böhm	**U**	All
(Austria) MG Sound Speed Division	Ginetta G61-LT-P3	Nissan VK56DE 5.6 L V8	61	(Austria) Andreas Fojtik	**U**	All
(France) M Racing	Ligier JS P320	Nissan VK56DE 5.6 L V8	68	(France) Hugo Delacour		1
(France) M Racing	Ligier JS P320	Nissan VK56DE 5.6 L V8	68	(France) Yann Ehrlacher		1
(Switzerland) T2 Racing	Duqueine M30 - D08	Nissan VK56DE 5.6 L V8	303	(Germany) Marcel Oosenbrugh		1, 6
(Switzerland) T2 Racing	Duqueine M30 - D08	Nissan VK56DE 5.6 L V8	303	(Germany) Dominik Schraml		1, 6
(Switzerland) T2 Racing	Duqueine M30 - D08	Nissan VK56DE 5.6 L V8	303	(Germany) Marc Basseng		1
(Switzerland) T2 Racing	Duqueine M30 - D08	Nissan VK56DE 5.6 L V8	303	(Germany) Sebastian Schmitt		6
NP02
(Spain) CD Sport	Nova Proto NP02	Ford Coyote 5.0 L V8	3	(United Kingdom) Nick Adcock		1–6
(Spain) CD Sport	Nova Proto NP02	Ford Coyote 5.0 L V8	3	(South Africa) Jonathan Thomas		1–6
(Spain) CD Sport	Nova Proto NP02	Ford Coyote 5.0 L V8	3	(Denmark) Michael Jensen		1–2, 5
(Spain) CD Sport	Nova Proto NP02	Ford Coyote 5.0 L V8	3	(France) Claude Degremont		6
(Spain) CD Sport	Nova Proto NP02	Ford Coyote 5.0 L V8	28	(France) Willyam Gosselin		6
(Spain) CD Sport	Nova Proto NP02	Ford Coyote 5.0 L V8	28	(France) Thomas Imbourg		6
(Spain) CD Sport	Nova Proto NP02	Ford Coyote 5.0 L V8	28	(United Kingdom) James Sweetnam		6
(France) Graff Racing	Nova Proto NP02	Ford Coyote 5.0 L V8	9	(France) David Droux		6
(France) Graff Racing	Nova Proto NP02	Ford Coyote 5.0 L V8	9	(Switzerland) Luis Sanjuan		6
(France) Graff Racing	Nova Proto NP02	Ford Coyote 5.0 L V8	9	(France) Eric Trouillet		6
(Switzerland) DIMAB Motorsport by ANS	Nova Proto NP02	Ford Coyote 5.0 L V8	11	(Switzerland) Grégory de Sybourg-Siffert		All
(Switzerland) DIMAB Motorsport by ANS	Nova Proto NP02	Ford Coyote 5.0 L V8	11	(Switzerland) Karen Gaillard		All
(France) ANS Motorsport	Nova Proto NP02	Ford Coyote 5.0 L V8	71	(Monaco) Marc Faggionato	**U** 4	All
(France) ANS Motorsport	Nova Proto NP02	Ford Coyote 5.0 L V8	71	(France) Philippe Mondolot	**U** 4	1–4, 6
(France) ANS Motorsport	Nova Proto NP02	Ford Coyote 5.0 L V8	71	(France) Iko Segret	**U** 4	5–6
(France) ANS Motorsport	Nova Proto NP02	Ford Coyote 5.0 L V8	72	(France) Frédéric Croullet		All
(France) ANS Motorsport	Nova Proto NP02	Ford Coyote 5.0 L V8	72	(France) Mathys Jaubert		1–3, 5–6
(France) ANS Motorsport	Nova Proto NP02	Ford Coyote 5.0 L V8	72	(France) Nicolas Schatz		4
(France) Lamo Racing	Nova Proto NP02	Ford Coyote 5.0 L V8	17	(Switzerland) Danny Buntschu		6
(France) Lamo Racing	Nova Proto NP02	Ford Coyote 5.0 L V8	17	(France) Nico Ferrarin		6
(France) Lamo Racing	Nova Proto NP02	Ford Coyote 5.0 L V8	17	(France) Laurent Prunet		6
(France) Lamo Racing	Nova Proto NP02	Ford Coyote 5.0 L V8	777	(France) Jean-Marc Alaphilippe	**U**	6
(France) Lamo Racing	Nova Proto NP02	Ford Coyote 5.0 L V8	777	(France) Alexandre Lafourcade	**U**	6
(France) Lamo Racing	Nova Proto NP02	Ford Coyote 5.0 L V8	777	(France) Thomas Perrin	**U**	6
(France) Weenrace	Nova Proto NP02	Ford Coyote 5.0 L V8	18	(France) William Cavailhes	**U**	4
(France) Weenrace	Nova Proto NP02	Ford Coyote 5.0 L V8	18	(France) José Ibañez	**U**	4
(France) Weenrace	Nova Proto NP02	Ford Coyote 5.0 L V8	18	(France) Christian Vassal	**U**	4
(France) DB Autosport	Nova Proto NP02	Ford Coyote 5.0 L V8	19	(France) David Cristini		6
(France) DB Autosport	Nova Proto NP02	Ford Coyote 5.0 L V8	19	(Switzerland) Sacha Clavadetscher		6
(France) DB Autosport	Nova Proto NP02	Ford Coyote 5.0 L V8	19	(France) David Delucinge		6
(France) DB Autosport	Nova Proto NP02	Ford Coyote 5.0 L V8	20	(France) Pierre Courroye		All
(France) DB Autosport	Nova Proto NP02	Ford Coyote 5.0 L V8	20	(France) Nicolas Marroc		1–3, 5–6
(France) DB Autosport	Nova Proto NP02	Ford Coyote 5.0 L V8	20	(France) Xavier Fort		1, 6
(France) DB Autosport	Nova Proto NP02	Ford Coyote 5.0 L V8	20	(France) Lionel Robert		4
(France) DB Autosport	Nova Proto NP02	Ford Coyote 5.0 L V8	21	(France) Daniel Bassora		All
(France) DB Autosport	Nova Proto NP02	Ford Coyote 5.0 L V8	21	(France) Philippe Yschard		All
(France) DB Autosport	Nova Proto NP02	Ford Coyote 5.0 L V8	21	(Switzerland) Mathias Beche		1–3, 5–6
(France) DB Autosport	Nova Proto NP02	Ford Coyote 5.0 L V8	21	(France) Antoine Robert		4
(Belgium) Sem Speed	Nova Proto NP02	Ford Coyote 5.0 L V8	26	(Belgium) Benoit Semoulin	**U**	1, 6
(Belgium) Sem Speed	Nova Proto NP02	Ford Coyote 5.0 L V8	26	(Belgium) François Semoulin	**U**	1, 6
(Switzerland) Racing Spirit of Léman	Nova Proto NP02	Ford Coyote 5.0 L V8	51	(Switzerland) Nicolas Maulini		All
(Switzerland) Racing Spirit of Léman	Nova Proto NP02	Ford Coyote 5.0 L V8	51	(France) Jacques Wolff		All
(France) Nerguti Competition	Nova Proto NP02	Ford Coyote 5.0 L V8	99	(France) Alban Nerguti		1–2, 6
(France) Nerguti Competition	Nova Proto NP02	Ford Coyote 5.0 L V8	99	(France) Dylan Nerguti		1–2, 6
(France) Nerguti Competition	Nova Proto NP02	Ford Coyote 5.0 L V8	99	(Monaco) Stéphane Ortelli		1–2, 6
(France) Cogemo Racing Team	Nova Proto NP02	Ford Coyote 5.0 L V8	555	(France) Denis Caillon	**U**	All
(France) Cogemo Racing Team	Nova Proto NP02	Ford Coyote 5.0 L V8	555	(France) Sébastien Morales	**U**	All
(France) Cogemo Racing Team	Nova Proto NP02	Ford Coyote 5.0 L V8	555	(France) Philippe Thirion	**U**	All
(France) Cogemo Racing Team	Nova Proto NP02	Ford Coyote 5.0 L V8	555	(France) Antoine Lacoste	**U**	3
CN
Wolf Racing France	Wolf GB08 Tornado	Honda K20A 2.0 L I4	22	(France) José Ibañez	**U** 1	1
Wolf Racing France	Wolf GB08 Tornado	Honda K20A 2.0 L I4	22	(Italy) Michele Fattorini	**U** 1	1
Wolf Racing France	Wolf GB08 Tornado	Honda K20A 2.0 L I4	22	(France) Nicolas Ferrarin	**U** 1	2–3
Wolf Racing France	Wolf GB08 Tornado	Honda K20A 2.0 L I4	22	(France) Jérémy Merires	**U** 1	2
Wolf Racing France	Wolf GB08 Tornado	Honda K20A 2.0 L I4	22	(France) Timothé Buret	**U** 1	3
Wolf Racing France	Wolf GB08 Tornado	Honda K20A 2.0 L I4	24	(France) Jérémy Merires		1
Wolf Racing France	Wolf GB08 Tornado	Honda K20A 2.0 L I4	25	(France) Nicolas Ferrarin		1
Wolf Racing France	Wolf GB08 Tornado	Honda K20A 2.0 L I4	25	(Italy) Emanuele Romani		1
Wolf Racing France	Wolf GB08 Tornado	Honda K20A 2.0 L I4	25	(France) Timothé Buret		2
Wolf Racing France	Wolf GB08 Tornado	Honda K20A 2.0 L I4	25	(Italy) Michele Fattorini		2
(Switzerland) T2 Racing	Norma M20-FC	Honda K20A 2.0 L I4	66	(Switzerland) Mike Fenzl	**U**	6
(Switzerland) T2 Racing	Norma M20-FC	Honda K20A 2.0 L I4	66	(Switzerland) Ivan Ruggiero	**U**	6
(Switzerland) T2 Racing	Norma M20-FC	Honda K20A 2.0 L I4	66	(Switzerland) Philipp Schlegel	**U**	6
(France) ANS Motorsport	Norma M20-FC	Honda K20A 2.0 L I4	73	(Switzerland) Sacha Clavadetscher	**U** 1	1–5
(France) ANS Motorsport	Norma M20-FC	Honda K20A 2.0 L I4	73	(France) Julien Lemoine	**U** 1	1
(France) ANS Motorsport	Norma M20-FC	Honda K20A 2.0 L I4	73	(France) Iko Segret	**U** 1	2–4
(France) ANS Motorsport	Norma M20-FC	Honda K20A 2.0 L I4	73	(France) Philibert Michy	**U** 1	5–6
(France) ANS Motorsport	Norma M20-FC	Honda K20A 2.0 L I4	73	(France) Clément Moreno	**U** 1	6
(France) HMC Racing	Funyo SP05 Evo	Peugeot 1.6 L I4	290	(France) Marc-Antoine Dannielou		2
(France) HMC Racing	Funyo SP05 Evo	Peugeot 1.6 L I4	290	(France) Nicolas Sturm		2

=== Race results ===
Bold indicates overall winner.

Round	Circuit	Pole Position	LMP3 Winning Car	NP02 Winning Car	Group CN Winning Car
Round	Circuit	Pole Position	LMP3 Winning Drivers	NP02 Winning Drivers	Group CN Winning Drivers
1	(France) Paul Ricard	(Poland) No. 14 Team Virage	**(Poland) No. 14 Team Virage**	(Spain) No. 3 CD Sport	No. 22 Wolf Racing France
1	(France) Paul Ricard	(Portugal) Manuel Espírito Santo; Vyacheslav Gutak (United Kingdom) George King	**(Portugal) Manuel Espírito Santo**; **Vyacheslav Gutak** **(United Kingdom) George King**	(United Kingdom) Nick Adcock (Denmark) Michael Jensen (South Africa) Jonathan Thomas	(France) Nicolas Ferrarin (Italy) Emanuele Romani
2	(Spain) Circuito de Navarra	(France) No. 10 Zosh Competition	(Italy) No. 27 TS Corse	**(Switzerland) No. 51**	(France) No. 73 ANS Motorsport
2	(Spain) Circuito de Navarra	(France) Jean René de Fournoux (France) Hugo Rosati	(United Kingdom) Georgi Dimitrov (United Kingdom) Ayrton Simmons (Canada) Jonathan Woolridge	**(Switzerland) Nicolas Maulini** **(France) Jacques Wolff**	(Switzerland) Sacha Clavadetscher (France) Iko Segret
3	(Germany) Hockenheimring	(Poland) No. 14 Team Virage	**(France) No. 10 Zosh Competition**	(France) No. 72 ANS Motorsport	(France) No. 73 ANS Motorsport
3	(Germany) Hockenheimring	(Portugal) Manuel Espírito Santo (United Kingdom) George King (Romania) Mihnea Ștefan	**(France) Jean René de Fournoux** **(France) Hugo Rosati**	(France) Frédéric Croullet (France) Mathys Jaubert	(Switzerland) Sacha Clavadetscher (France) Iko Segret
4	(Portugal) Circuito do Estoril	(Poland) No. 14 Team Virage	**(Poland) No. 14 Team Virage**	(France) No. 20 DB Autosport	(France) No. 73 ANS Motorsport
4	(Portugal) Circuito do Estoril	(Portugal) Manuel Espírito Santo; Vyacheslav Gutak (United Kingdom) George King	**(Portugal) Manuel Espírito Santo**; **Vyacheslav Gutak** **(United Kingdom) George King**	(France) Pierre Courroye (France) Lionel Robert	(Switzerland) Sacha Clavadetscher (France) Iko Segret
5	(France) Magny-Cours	(Poland) No. 14 Team Virage	**(Poland) No. 14 Team Virage**	(France) No. 71 ANS Motorsport	(France) No. 73 ANS Motorsport
5	(France) Magny-Cours	(Portugal) Manuel Espírito Santo; Vyacheslav Gutak (United Kingdom) George King	**(Portugal) Manuel Espírito Santo**; **Vyacheslav Gutak** **(United Kingdom) George King**	(Monaco) Marc Faggionato (France) Iko Segret	(Switzerland) Sacha Clavadetscher (France) Philibert Michy
6	(France) Paul Ricard	(Poland) No. 14 Team Virage	**(Poland) No. 92 Team Virage**	(France) No. 9 Graff Racing	(Switzerland) No. 66 T2 Racing
6	(France) Paul Ricard	(Portugal) Manuel Espírito Santo; Vyacheslav Gutak (United Kingdom) George King	**(Italy) Jacopo Faccioni** **(United Kingdom) Jamie Falvey** **(Switzerland) Axel Gnos**	(France) David Droux (Switzerland) Luis Sanjuan (France) Eric Trouillet	(Switzerland) Mike Fenzl (Switzerland) Ivan Ruggiero (Switzerland) Philipp Schlegel

=== Championship standings ===
==== Classes ====
Pos.	Drivers	Team	(France) LEC1	(Spain) NAV	(Germany) HOC	(Portugal) EST	(France) MAG	(France) LEC2	Points	UC
Overall
1	(United Kingdom) George King	(Poland) Team Virage	**1**	11	**2**	**1**	**1**	**6**	126.75	
2	(Portugal) Manuel Espírito Santo	(Poland) Team Virage	**1**		**2**	**1**	**1**	**6**	126	
3	Vyacheslav Gutak	(Poland) Team Virage	**1**			**1**	**1**	**6**	108	
4	(Switzerland) Nicolas Maulini (France) Jacques Wolff	(Switzerland) Racing Spirit of Léman	Ret	1	12	3	4	4	92	
5	(France) Frédéric Croullet	(France) ANS Motorsport	9	3	3	5	5	Ret	69.5	
6	(United Kingdom) Ayrton Simmons	(Italy) TS Corse	2	4	7	11	2	7	67	
7	(Switzerland) Grégory de Sybourg-Siffert (Switzerland) Karen Gaillard	(Switzerland) DIMAB Motorsport by ANS	7	13	6	4	7	5	54.75	
8	(France) Pierre Courroye	(France) DB Autosport	17	Ret	4	2	9	15	51	
9	(France) Mathys Jaubert	(France) ANS Motorsport	9	3	3		5	Ret	49.5	
10	(France) Daniel Bassora (France) Philippe Yschard	(France) DB Autosport	8	2	10	8	10	Ret	41	
LMP3
1	(United Kingdom) George King	(Poland) Team Virage	**1**	11	**2**	**1**	**1**	**6**	151	
2	(Portugal) Manuel Espírito Santo	(Poland) Team Virage	**1**		**2**	**1**	**1**	**6**	133	
3	(United Kingdom) Ayrton Simmons	(Italy) TS Corse	2	**4**	7	11	2	7	121.5	
4	Vyacheslav Gutak	(Poland) Team Virage	**1**			**1**	**1**	**6**	115	
5	(United Kingdom) Georgi Dimitrov	(Italy) TS Corse	2	**4**					55.5	
6	(Austria) Martin Böhm (Austria) Andreas Fojtik	(Austria) MG Sound Speed Division	14	Ret	14	9	11	26	50.5	129
7	(Canada) Jonathan Woolridge	(Italy) TS Corse		**4**	7				49.5	
8	(France) Claude Rosati (France) Rodolphe Rosati	(France) Zosh Competition	12	5	5			Ret	48.5	87.5
9	(France) Jean René de Fournoux (France) Hugo Rosati	(France) Zosh Competition	Ret	**7**	1			Ret	47.5	
10	(France) Nicolas Chartier (France) Vincent Capillaire	(France) Graff Racing			9	6			47	
10	(France) Nicolas Chartier (France) Vincent Capillaire	(Germany) Reiter Engineering						18	47	
11	(Switzerland) Stephan Rupp	(France) Graff Racing			9	6			46	
12	(Italy) Jacopo Faccioni (United Kingdom) Jamie Falvey	(Poland) Team Virage					6	1	40	
13	(Romania) Mihnea Ștefan	(Poland) Team Virage		11	**2**				36	
14	(Switzerland) Axel Gnos	(Poland) Team Virage						1	25	
15	(Portugal) Zdeněk Chovanec (Mozambique) Pedro Perino	(Italy) TS Corse				11			24	
16	(Switzerland) Samir Ben (Switzerland) Loris Kyburz	(France) Graff Racing	4		11				20	
17	(Spain) Toni Forné	(Italy) TS Corse	2						18	
18	(Italy) Gianluca Giraudi	(Italy) TS Corse					2		18	
19	(Greece) Panagiotis Kaitatzis (Greece) Georgios Kolovos (France) Louis Rossi	(France) Graff Racing						2	18	25
20	(Portugal) Bernardo Pinheiro	(Poland) Team Virage		11					18	
21	(United Kingdom) Matt Bell (United States) John Melsom	(United Kingdom) Nielsen Racing	3						15	
22	(Portugal) Frederico Peters	(Poland) Team Virage					6		15	
23	(United Kingdom) Chris Short	(Poland) Inter Europol Competition	6					14	14	
24	(Mexico) Ian Aguilera	(Italy) TS Corse			7				12	
25	(Denmark) Theodor Jensen (Australia) Nathan Kumar	(Italy) TS Corse						7	12	
26	(Switzerland) Luis Sanjuan	(France) Graff Racing	4						12	
27	(Canada) Daniel Ali (United States) Bryson Morris	(Poland) Inter Europol Competition	6						10	
28	(United Kingdom) John Corbett (Australia) Jamie Winslow	(Poland) Inter Europol Competition						8	10	
29	(France) Marius Fossard (France) Jean-Ludovic Foubert	(Switzerland) Racing Spirit of Léman						10	8	
30	(France) Thibault Ehrhart (France) Julien Schell	(France) Pegasus Racing	11						8	
31	(China) Haowen Luo	(France) Graff Racing			11				8	
32	(Germany) Torsten Kratz (United States) Danny Soufi	(Austria) Konrad Motorsport						11	6	
33	(Germany) Marcel Oosenbrugh (Germany) Dominik Schraml	(Switzerland) T2 Racing	13					29	4.5	
34	(Germany) Marc Basseng	(Switzerland) T2 Racing	13						4	
35	(France) Romain Favre (Spain) Maximus Mayer	(Poland) Inter Europol Competition						14	4	
36	(Italy) Francesco Dracone (Netherlands) Beitske Visser	(United Kingdom) BHK Motorsport						17	2	
37	(Romania) Alex Cascatău (Switzerland) Elia Sperandio (France) Joël Roussel	(United Kingdom) BHK Motorsport	15						1	
38	(Mexico) Diego de la Torre (Algeria) Julien Gerbi (Mexico) Raúl Guzmán	(Poland) Team Virage						19	0.5	
39	(Australia) George Nakas (Australia) Fraser Ross	(France) Graff Racing						23	0.5	
40	(Germany) Sebastian Schmitt	(Switzerland) T2 Racing						29	0.5	
	(France) Hugo Delacour (France) Yann Ehrlacher	(France) M Racing	Ret						0	
NP02
1	(Switzerland) Nicolas Maulini (France) Jacques Wolff	(Switzerland) Racing Spirit of Léman	Ret	1	12	3	**4**	4	117.5	
2	(Switzerland) Grégory de Sybourg-Siffert (Switzerland) Karen Gaillard	(Switzerland) DIMAB Motorsport by ANS	**7**	**13**	6	**4**	7	5	99	
3	(France) Frédéric Croullet	(France) ANS Motorsport	9	3	3	5	5	Ret	98.5	
4	(France) Pierre Courroye	(France) DB Autosport	17	Ret	**4**	2	9	15	90	
5	(Monaco) Marc Faggionato	(France) ANS Motorsport	10	Ret	8	7	3	9	79	100
6	(France) Mathys Jaubert	(France) ANS Motorsport	9	3	3		5	Ret	74.5	
7	(France) Daniel Bassora (France) Philippe Yschard	(France) DB Autosport	8	2	10	8	10	Ret	74	
8	(United Kingdom) Nick Adcock (South Africa) Jonathan Thomas	(Spain) CD Sport	5	12	16	10	8	12	73	
9	(Denmark) Michael Jensen	(Spain) CD Sport	5	12		10	8		59	
10	(Switzerland) Mathias Beche	(France) DB Autosport	8	2	10		10	Ret	58	
11	(France) Philippe Mondolot	(France) ANS Motorsport	10	Ret	8	7		9	54	100
12	(France) Lionel Robert	(France) DB Autosport				2			50	
13	(France) Iko Segret	(France) ANS Motorsport					3	9	37	
14	(France) Nicolas Marroc	(France) DB Autosport	17	Ret	**4**		9		34	
15	(France) Denis Caillon (France) Sébastien Morales (France) Philippe Thirion	(France) Cogemo Racing Team	Ret	6	15	Ret	Ret	16	28	80.5
16	(France) David Droux (Switzerland) Luis Sanjuan (France) Eric Trouillet	(France) Graff Racing						**3**	25	
17	(France) Nicolas Schatz	(France) ANS Motorsport				5			24	
18	(France) Alban Nerguti (France) Dylan Nerguti (Monaco) Stéphane Ortelli	(France) Nerguti Competition	18	8				20	23	
19	(France) Antoine Robert	(France) DB Autosport				8			16	
20	(France) Willyam Gosselin (France) Thomas Imbourg (United Kingdom) James Sweetnam	(Spain) CD Sport						13	8	
21	(France) Xavier Fort	(France) DB Autosport	17						8	
22	(France) Antoine Lacoste	(France) Cogemo Racing Team			15				6	18
23	(France) David Cristini (Switzerland) Sacha Clavadetscher (France) David Delucinge	(France) DB Autosport						21	1	
24	(Switzerland) Danny Buntschu (France) Nico Ferrarin (France) Laurent Prunet	(France) Lamo Racing						22	0.5	
25	(Belgium) Benoit Semoulin (Belgium) François Semoulin	(Belgium) Sem Speed	WD					24	0.5	18
26	(France) Jean-Marc Alaphilippe (France) Alexandre Lafourcade (France) Thomas Perrin	(France) Lamo Racing						25	0.5	15
	(France) William Cavailhes (France) José Ibañez (France) Christian Vassal	(France) Weenrace				Ret			0	0
Group CN
1	(Switzerland) Sacha Clavadetscher	(France) ANS Motorsport	**Ret**	**9**	**13**	**12**	**12**		137.5	
2	(France) Iko Segret	(France) ANS Motorsport		**9**	**13**	**12**			112.5	
3	(France) Philibert Michy	(France) ANS Motorsport					**12**	**28**	43	18
4	(France) Marc-Antoine Dannielou (France) Nicolas Sturm	(France) HMC Racing		10					27	
5	(France) Nicolas Ferrarin	Wolf Racing France	16	Ret	Ret				25	
5	(Italy) Emanuele Romani	Wolf Racing France	16	Ret					25	
6	(Switzerland) Mike Fenzl (Switzerland) Ivan Ruggiero (Switzerland) Philipp Schlegel	(Switzerland) T2 Racing						27	25	25
7	(France) Clément Moreno	(France) ANS Motorsport						**28**	18	18
	(France) Julien Lemoine	(France) ANS Motorsport	**Ret**						0	
	(France) Timothé Buret	Wolf Racing France		Ret	Ret				0	
	(France) Jérémy Merires	Wolf Racing France	DNS	Ret					0	
	(Italy) Michele Fattorini (France) José Ibañez	Wolf Racing France	DNS						0	0
Pos.	Drivers	Team	(France) LEC1	(Spain) NAV	(Germany) HOC	(Portugal) EST	(France) MAG	(France) LEC2	Points	UC

==== Teams ====
Pos.	Team	(France) LEC1	(Spain) NAV	(Germany) HOC	(Portugal) EST	(France) MAG	(France) LEC2	Points
1	(Poland) Team Virage	**1**	11	**2**	**1**	**1**	1	151
2	(France) ANS Motorsport	9	3	3	5	3	9	136.5
3	(France) DB Autosport	8	2	**4**	2	9	15	124
4	(Italy) TS Corse	2	**4**	7	11	2	7	121.5
5	(Switzerland) Racing Spirit of Léman	Ret	1	12	3	**4**	4	117.5
6	(Switzerland) DIMAB Motorsport by ANS	**7**	**13**	6	**4**	7	5	99
7	(France) Graff Racing	4		9	6		**3**	83
8	(Spain) CD Sport	5	12	16	10	8	12	73
9	(France) Zosh Competition	12	5	1			Ret	58
10	(Austria) MG Sound Speed Division	14	Ret	14	9	14	26	50.5
11	(France) Cogemo Racing Team	Ret	6	15	Ret	Ret	16	28
12	(France) HMC Racing		10					27
13	Wolf Racing France	16	Ret	Ret				25
14	(France) Nerguti Competition	18	8				20	23
15	(Poland) Inter Europol Competition	6					8	20
16	(Switzerland) T2 Racing	13					27	16.5
17	(United Kingdom) Nielsen Racing	3						15
18	(France) Pegasus Racing	11						8
19	(Austria) Konrad Motorsport						11	6
20	(United Kingdom) BHK Motorsport	15					17	3
21	(Germany) Reiter Engineering						18	1
22	(France) Lamo Racing						22	0.5
23	(Belgium) Sem Speed	WD					24	0.5
	(France) M Racing	Ret						0
	(France) Weenrace				Ret			0
Pos.	Team	(France) LEC1	(Spain) NAV	(Germany) HOC	(Portugal) EST	(France) MAG	(France) LEC2	Points

== Endurance GT Touring Challenge ==
The Endurance GT Touring Challenge is open to GT3, GT4, single-make series (Porsche Carrera Cup, Ferrari Challenge, Lamborghini Super Trofeo), TCR cars.

=== Teams and drivers ===
Team	Chassis	Engine	No.	Drivers	Rounds
3A
(France) Visiom	Ferrari 488 GT3 Evo 2020	Ferrari 3.9 L Twin-Turbo V8	1	(France) Jean-Bernard Bouvet	All
(France) Visiom	Ferrari 488 GT3 Evo 2020	Ferrari 3.9 L Twin-Turbo V8	1	(France) David Hallyday	All
(France) Visiom	Ferrari 488 GT3 Evo 2020	Ferrari 3.9 L Twin-Turbo V8	1	(France) Jean-Paul Pagny	All
(France) Krafft Racing	Renault R.S. 01 F GT3	Nissan VR38DETT 3.0 L V6	9	(France) Laurene Godey	6
(France) Krafft Racing	Renault R.S. 01 F GT3	Nissan VR38DETT 3.0 L V6	9	(France) Grégory Launier	6
(France) Krafft Racing	Renault R.S. 01 F GT3	Nissan VR38DETT 3.0 L V6	9	(France) Sébastien Loeb	6
(Switzerland) Racing Spirit of Léman	Aston Martin Vantage AMR GT3	Aston Martin 4.0 L Turbo V8	10	(France) Erwan Bastard	6
(Switzerland) Racing Spirit of Léman	Aston Martin Vantage AMR GT3	Aston Martin 4.0 L Turbo V8	10	(United States) Derek DeBoer	6
(Switzerland) Racing Spirit of Léman	Aston Martin Vantage AMR GT3	Aston Martin 4.0 L Turbo V8	10	(France) Florent Grizaud	6
(France) AB Sport Auto	Renault R.S. 01 F GT3	Nissan VR38DETT 3.0 L V6	31	(France) Jonathan Cochet	1–3
(France) AB Sport Auto	Renault R.S. 01 F GT3	Nissan VR38DETT 3.0 L V6	31	(France) Rémy Kirchdoerffer	1–3
(Italy) AF Corse	Ferrari 488 GT3 Evo 2020	Ferrari 3.9 L Twin-Turbo V8	52	(France) Franck Dezoteux	6
(Italy) AF Corse	Ferrari 488 GT3 Evo 2020	Ferrari 3.9 L Twin-Turbo V8	52	(France) Henri Dezoteux	6
(Italy) AF Corse	Ferrari 488 GT3 Evo 2020	Ferrari 3.9 L Twin-Turbo V8	52	(France) Simon Dezoteux	6
(France) AKKodis ASP Team	Mercedes-AMG GT3 Evo	Mercedes-AMG M159 6.2 L V8	53	(France) Christophe Bourret	6
(France) AKKodis ASP Team	Mercedes-AMG GT3 Evo	Mercedes-AMG M159 6.2 L V8	53	(France) Pascal Gibon	6
3A2
(Belgium) BDR Competition Grupo Prom	Lamborghini Huracán Super Trofeo Evo 2	Lamborghini 5.2 L V10	77	(Belgium) Amaury Bonduel	2, 6
(Belgium) BDR Competition Grupo Prom	Lamborghini Huracán Super Trofeo Evo 2	Lamborghini 5.2 L V10	77	(Mexico) Alfredo Hernandez	2, 6
3B
(France) XP Racing	Ferrari 488 Challenge Evo	Ferrari 3.9 L Turbo V8	72 1; 74 5	(France) Roland Marchix	1–4, 6
(France) XP Racing	Ferrari 488 Challenge Evo	Ferrari 3.9 L Turbo V8	72 1; 74 5	(France) Karl Pedraza	1–3, 5
(France) XP Racing	Ferrari 488 Challenge Evo	Ferrari 3.9 L Turbo V8	72 1; 74 5	(France) Philippe Papin	1, 3–6
(France) XP Racing	Ferrari 488 Challenge Evo	Ferrari 3.9 L Turbo V8	72 1; 74 5	(France) Xavier Pompidou	4–6
(France) Vortex V8	Vortex 1.0	Chevrolet 6.2 L V8	701	(France) Miguel Moiola	1–3, 5–6
(France) Vortex V8	Vortex 1.0	Chevrolet 6.2 L V8	701	(France) Vincent Congnet	1, 3, 5
(France) Vortex V8	Vortex 1.0	Chevrolet 6.2 L V8	701	(France) Cyril Calmon	1, 6
(France) Vortex V8	Vortex 1.0	Chevrolet 6.2 L V8	701	(France) Philippe Gruau	2
(France) Vortex V8	Vortex 1.0	Chevrolet 6.2 L V8	701	(France) Lorina Padovani	2
(France) Vortex V8	Vortex 1.0	Chevrolet 6.2 L V8	701	(France) Philippe Bonnel	3, 5–6
(France) Vortex V8	Vortex 1.0	Chevrolet 6.2 L V8	702	(France) Solenn Amrouche	1, 3, 5–6
(France) Vortex V8	Vortex 1.0	Chevrolet 6.2 L V8	702	(France) Lorina Padovani	1, 3, 5–6
(France) Vortex V8	Vortex 1.0	Chevrolet 6.2 L V8	702	(France) Antoine Rizzo	1, 6
(France) Vortex V8	Vortex 1.0	Chevrolet 6.2 L V8	702	(France) Arnaud Gomez	2–3
(France) Vortex V8	Vortex 1.0	Chevrolet 6.2 L V8	702	(France) Lionel Amrouche	2, 5
(France) Vortex V8	Vortex 1.0	Chevrolet 6.2 L V8	702	(France) Olivier Gomez	2
Porsche Cup
(France) 2B Autosport	Porsche 992 GT3 Cup	Porsche 4.0 L Flat-6	7	(France) Olivier Favre	1, 4, 6
(France) 2B Autosport	Porsche 992 GT3 Cup	Porsche 4.0 L Flat-6	7	(France) Yann Penlou	1, 4, 6
(France) 2B Autosport	Porsche 992 GT3 Cup	Porsche 4.0 L Flat-6	7	(France) Romain Favre	1
(France) 2B Autosport	Porsche 992 GT3 Cup	Porsche 4.0 L Flat-6	7	(France) Hugo Chevalier	4, 6
(France) Seb Lajoux Racing	Porsche 992 GT3 Cup	Porsche 4.0 L Flat-6	48	(France) Lucas Walter	All
(France) Seb Lajoux Racing	Porsche 992 GT3 Cup	Porsche 4.0 L Flat-6	48	(France) Sébastien Lajoux	1–3, 5–6
(France) Seb Lajoux Racing	Porsche 992 GT3 Cup	Porsche 4.0 L Flat-6	48	(France) Laurent Cochard	1
(France) Seb Lajoux Racing	Porsche 992 GT3 Cup	Porsche 4.0 L Flat-6	48	(France) Lauris Nauroy	2–4, 6
(France) Seb Lajoux Racing	Porsche 992 GT3 Cup	Porsche 4.0 L Flat-6	48	(France) Jean-Baptiste Simmenauer	4
(France) Seb Lajoux Racing	Porsche 992 GT3 Cup	Porsche 4.0 L Flat-6	48	(Belgium) Giovanni Scamardi	5
(France) Seb Lajoux Racing	Porsche 992 GT3 Cup	Porsche 4.0 L Flat-6	888	(Belgium) Benjamin Paque	6
(France) Seb Lajoux Racing	Porsche 992 GT3 Cup	Porsche 4.0 L Flat-6	888	(France) Stéphane Perrin	6
(Italy) GDL67 Racing	Porsche 992 GT3 Cup	Porsche 4.0 L Flat-6	67	(Italy) Mario Cordoni	1
(Italy) GDL67 Racing	Porsche 992 GT3 Cup	Porsche 4.0 L Flat-6	67	(Italy) Gianluca de Lorenzi	1
(France) Martinet by Alméras	Porsche 992 GT3 Cup	Porsche 4.0 L Flat-6	71	(France) Pierre Martinet	1, 3, 5–6
(France) Martinet by Alméras	Porsche 992 GT3 Cup	Porsche 4.0 L Flat-6	71	(France) Gérard Tremblay	1, 3, 5–6
(France) Martinet by Alméras	Porsche 992 GT3 Cup	Porsche 4.0 L Flat-6	71	(France) Julien Fébreau	1
(France) Martinet by Alméras	Porsche 992 GT3 Cup	Porsche 4.0 L Flat-6	71	(France) Arthur Mathieu	3
(France) Martinet by Alméras	Porsche 992 GT3 Cup	Porsche 4.0 L Flat-6	71	(France) Alessandro Ghiretti	5–6
(France) Martinet by Alméras	Porsche 992 GT3 Cup	Porsche 4.0 L Flat-6	94	(France) Cédric Mezard	1
(France) Martinet by Alméras	Porsche 992 GT3 Cup	Porsche 4.0 L Flat-6	94	(France) Marius Mezard	1
(France) Martinet by Alméras	Porsche 992 GT3 Cup	Porsche 4.0 L Flat-6	94	(France) Alessandro Ghiretti	1
(France) Martinet by Alméras	Porsche 992 GT3 Cup	Porsche 4.0 L Flat-6	95	(France) Joffrey Dorchy	All
(France) Martinet by Alméras	Porsche 992 GT3 Cup	Porsche 4.0 L Flat-6	95	(France) Mathieu Martins	All
(France) Martinet by Alméras	Porsche 992 GT3 Cup	Porsche 4.0 L Flat-6	95	(France) Julien Froment	1–3, 5–6
(France) GP Racing Team	Porsche 992 GT3 Cup	Porsche 4.0 L Flat-6	89	(France) Loïc Teire	All
(France) GP Racing Team	Porsche 992 GT3 Cup	Porsche 4.0 L Flat-6	89	(France) Frédéric Lacore	1–4, 6
(France) GP Racing Team	Porsche 992 GT3 Cup	Porsche 4.0 L Flat-6	89	(France) Gabriel Pemeant	1, 5–6
(France) GP Racing Team	Porsche 992 GT3 Cup	Porsche 4.0 L Flat-6	89	(France) Lionel Rigaud	5
(Portugal) Racar Motorsport	Porsche 992 GT3 Cup	Porsche 4.0 L Flat-6	911	(Portugal) Leandro Martins	4
(Portugal) Racar Motorsport	Porsche 992 GT3 Cup	Porsche 4.0 L Flat-6	911	(Austria) Dieter Svepes	4
C4A
(France) Team Speedcar	Audi R8 LMS GT4 Evo	Audi 5.2 L V10	8	(France) Pascal Destembert	1
(France) Team Speedcar	Audi R8 LMS GT4 Evo	Audi 5.2 L V10	8	(France) Julien Goujat	1
(France) GL Racing Team	Audi R8 LMS GT4 Evo	Audi 5.2 L V10	13	(France) Philippe Cosi	6
(France) GL Racing Team	Audi R8 LMS GT4 Evo	Audi 5.2 L V10	13	(France) Ahmed Henni	6
(France) L'Espace Bienvenue	BMW M4 GT4 Gen II	BMW 3.0 L Twin-Turbo I6	17	(Belgium) Daniel Waszczinsky	All
(France) L'Espace Bienvenue	BMW M4 GT4 Gen II	BMW 3.0 L Twin-Turbo I6	17	(France) Régis Rego de Sebes	1–5
(France) L'Espace Bienvenue	BMW M4 GT4 Gen II	BMW 3.0 L Twin-Turbo I6	17	(Belgium) Benjamin Lessennes	4, 6
(Germany) WS Racing	BMW M4 GT4 Gen II	BMW 3.0 L Twin-Turbo I6	33	(Germany) Tim Rölleke	6
(Germany) WS Racing	BMW M4 GT4 Gen II	BMW 3.0 L Twin-Turbo I6	33	(Romania) Tudor Tudurachi	6
(France) CMR	Ginetta G56 GT4	GM LS3 6.2 L V8	56	(United Kingdom) Michael Simpson	5
(France) CMR	Ginetta G56 GT4	GM LS3 6.2 L V8	56	(United Kingdom) Freddie Tomlinson	5
(France) CMR	Ginetta G56 GT4	GM LS3 6.2 L V8	56	(United Kingdom) Lawrence Tomlinson	5
(France) CMR	Ginetta G56 GT4	GM LS3 6.2 L V8	68	(France) Nicolas Elie	6
(France) CMR	Ginetta G56 GT4	GM LS3 6.2 L V8	68	(France) Laurent Mogica	6
(France) CMR	Porsche 718 Cayman GT4 Clubsport	Porsche 3.8 L Flat-6	68	(France) Nicolas Elie	4
(France) CMR	Porsche 718 Cayman GT4 Clubsport	Porsche 3.8 L Flat-6	68	(France) Laurent Mogica	4
(France) Milan Competition	Audi R8 LMS GT4 Evo	Audi 5.2 L V10	64	(France) Pierre Arraou	2
(France) Milan Competition	Audi R8 LMS GT4 Evo	Audi 5.2 L V10	64	(France) Frédéric Billon	2
C4B
(France) DS Events	Ligier JS2 R	Ford 3.7 L V6	12	(France) Jules Doncieux	5
(France) DS Events	Ligier JS2 R	Ford 3.7 L V6	12	(France) Nico Ferrarin	5
(France) Chazel Technologie Course	Alpine A110 Cup	Alpine 1.4 L I4	14	(France) Michel Abattu	5
(France) Chazel Technologie Course	Alpine A110 Cup	Alpine 1.4 L I4	14	(France) Félix Crepet	5
(France) Chazel Technologie Course	Alpine A110 Cup	Alpine 1.4 L I4	14	(France) Stéphane Lipp	5
(France) Chazel Technologie Course	Alpine A110 Cup	Alpine 1.4 L I4	14	(France) Guillaume Masset	5
(France) Chazel Technologie Course	Alpine A110 Cup	Alpine 1.4 L I4	19	(France) Julien Bounie	5–6
(France) Chazel Technologie Course	Alpine A110 Cup	Alpine 1.4 L I4	19	(France) Benoit Marion	5–6
(France) Chazel Technologie Course	Alpine A110 Cup	Alpine 1.4 L I4	19	(France) Olivier Martinez	5–6
(France) Chazel Technologie Course	Alpine A110 Cup	Alpine 1.4 L I4	93	(France) Julien Bounie	1–3
(France) Chazel Technologie Course	Alpine A110 Cup	Alpine 1.4 L I4	93	(France) Benoit Marion	1–3
(France) Chazel Technologie Course	Alpine A110 Cup	Alpine 1.4 L I4	93	(France) Olivier Martinez	1–3
(France) ANS Motorsport	Ligier JS2 R	Ford 3.7 L V6	42	(France) Julien Lemoine	1, 3–6
(France) ANS Motorsport	Ligier JS2 R	Ford 3.7 L V6	42	(France) Nicolas Schatz	1, 3–4
(France) ANS Motorsport	Ligier JS2 R	Ford 3.7 L V6	42	(France) Clément Moreno	5–6

=== Race results ===
Bold indicates overall winner.

Round	Circuit	Pole Position	3A Winning Car	3B Winning Car	Porsche Cup Winning Car	C4A Winning Car	C4B Winning Car
Round	Circuit	Pole Position	3A Winning Drivers	3B Winning Drivers	Porsche Cup Winning Drivers	C4A Winning Drivers	C4B Winning Drivers
1	(France) Paul Ricard	(France) No. 1 Visiom	**(France) No. 1 Visiom**	(France) No. 701 Vortex V8	(France) No. 94 Martinet by Alméras	(France) No. 17 L'Espace Bienvenue	(France) No. 42 ANS Motorsport
1	(France) Paul Ricard	(France) Jean-Bernard Bouvet (France) David Hallyday (France) Jean-Paul Pagny	**(France) Jean-Bernard Bouvet** **(France) David Hallyday** **(France) Jean-Paul Pagny**	(France) Cyril Calmon (France) Vincent Connet (France) Miguel Moiola	(France) Cédric Mezard (France) Marius Mezard (France) Alessandro Ghiretti	(France) Régis Rego de Sebes (Belgium) Daniel Waszczinsky	(France) Julien Lemoine (France) Nicolas Schatz
2	(Spain) Circuito de Navarra	(France) No. 31 AB Sport Auto	**(France) No. 1 Visiom**	(France) No. 701 Vortex V8	(France) No. 95 Martinet by Alméras	(France) No. 17 L'Espace Bienvenue	(France) No. 93 Chazel Technologie Course
2	(Spain) Circuito de Navarra	(France) Jonathan Cochet (France) Rémy Kirchdoerffer	**(France) Jean-Bernard Bouvet** **(France) David Hallyday** **(France) Jean-Paul Pagny**	(France) Philippe Gruau (France) Miguel Moiola (France) Laurina Padovina	(France) Joffrey Dorchy (France) Julien Froment (France) Mathieu Martins	(France) Régis Rego de Sebes (Belgium) Daniel Waszczinsky	(France) Julien Bounie (France) Marion Benoit (France) Olivier Martinez
3	(Germany) Hockenheimring	(France) No. 1 Visiom	No starters	(France) No. 701 Vortex V8	**(France) No. 95 Martinet by Alméras**	(France) No. 17 L'Espace Bienvenue	(France) No. 42 ANS Motorsport
3	(Germany) Hockenheimring	(France) Jean-Bernard Bouvet (France) David Hallyday (France) Jean-Paul Pagny	No starters	(France) Philippe Bonnel (France) Vincent Congnet (France) Miguel Moiola	**(France) Joffrey Dorchy** **(France) Julien Froment** **(France) Mathieu Martins**	(France) Régis Rego de Sebes (Belgium) Daniel Waszczinsky	(France) Julien Lemoine (France) Nicolas Schatz
4	(Portugal) Circuito do Estoril	(France) No. 1 Visiom	**(France) No. 1 Visiom**	(France) No. 74 XP Racing	(France) No. 95 Martinet by Alméras	(France) No. 17 L'Espace Bienvenue	(France) No. 42 ANS Motorsport
4	(Portugal) Circuito do Estoril	(France) Jean-Bernard Bouvet (France) David Hallyday (France) Jean-Paul Pagny	**(France) Jean-Bernard Bouvet** **(France) David Hallyday** **(France) Jean-Paul Pagny**	(France) Roland Marchix (France) Philippe Papin (France) Xavier Pompidou	(France) Jeffrey Darchy (France) Mathieu Martins	(Belgium) Benjamin Lessennes (France) Régis Rego de Sebes (Belgium) Daniel Waszczinsky	(France) Julien Lemoine (France) Nicolas Schatz
5	(France) Magny-Cours	(France) No. 1 Visiom	**(France) No. 1 Visiom**	(France) No. 701 Vortex V8	(France) No. 95 Martinet by Alméras	(France) No. 56 CMR	(France) No. 12 DS Events
5	(France) Magny-Cours	(France) Jean-Bernard Bouvet (France) David Hallyday (France) Jean-Paul Pagny	**(France) Jean-Bernard Bouvet** **(France) David Hallyday** **(France) Jean-Paul Pagny**	(France) Philippe Bonnel (France) Vincent Congnet (France) Miguel Moiola	(France) Joffrey Dorchy (France) Julien Froment (France) Mathieu Martins	(United Kingdom) Michael Simpson (United Kingdom) Freddie Tomlinson (United Kingdom) Lawrence Tomlinson	(France) Jules Doncieux (France) Nico Ferrarin
6	(France) Paul Ricard	(Switzerland) No. 10 Racing Spirit of Léman	**(France) No. 1 Visiom**	(France) No. 701 Vortex V8	(France) No. 95 Martinet by Alméras	(France) No. 17 L'Espace Bienvenue	(France) No. 19 Chazel Technologie Course
6	(France) Paul Ricard	(France) Erwan Bastard (United States) Derek DeBoer (France) Florent Grizaud	**(France) Jean-Bernard Bouvet** **(France) David Hallyday** **(France) Jean-Paul Pagny**	(France) Philippe Bonnel (France) Cyril Calmon (France) Miguel Moiola	(France) Joffrey Dorchy (France) Julien Froment (France) Mathieu Martins	(Belgium) Benjamin Lessennes (Belgium) Daniel Waszczinsky	(France) Julien Bounie (France) Marion Benoit (France) Olivier Martinez

=== Championship standings ===
==== Classes ====
Pos.	Drivers	Team	(France) LEC1	(Spain) NAV	(Germany) HOC	(Portugal) EST	(France) MAG	(France) LEC2	Points
Overall
1	(France) Jean-Bernard Bouvet (France) David Hallyday (France) Jean-Paul Pagny	(France) Visiom	**1**	1	**DNS**	**1**	**1**	1	162.5
2	(France) Joffrey Dorchy (France) Mathieu Martins	(France) Martinet by Alméras	13	3	1	2	2	4	114
3	(France) Lucas Walter	(France) Seb Lajoux Racing	6	4	3	5	3	8	80
4	(France) Julien Froment	(France) Martinet by Alméras	13	3	1		2	4	78
5	(France) Loïc Teire	(France) GP Racing Team	7	5	2	6	4	9	69
7	(France) Sébastien Lajoux	(France) Seb Lajoux Racing	6	4	3		3	8	60
8	(France) Lauris Nauroy	(France) Seb Lajoux Racing		4	3	5		8	57
6	(France) Frédéric Lacore	(France) GP Racing Team	7	5	2	6		9	57
9	(France) Gabriel Pemeant	(France) GP Racing Team	7		2	6	4	9	54
10	(France) Jonathan Cochet (France) Rémy Kirchdoerffer	(Switzerland) AB Sport Auto	2	**2**	DNS				45
11	(France) Miguel Moiola	(France) Vortex V8	8	6	6		5	10	35
12	(France) Olivier Favre (France) Yann Penlou	(France) 2B Autosport	5			4		11	34.5
13	(Portugal) Leandro Martins (Austria) Dieter Svepes	(Portugal) Racar Motorsport				3			30
14	(France) Hugo Chevalier	(France) 2B Autosport				4		11	30.5
15	(Belgium) Daniel Waszczinsky	(France) L'Espace Bienvenue	12	8	5	9	9	12	23
3A
1	(France) Jean-Bernard Bouvet (France) David Hallyday (France) Jean-Paul Pagny	(France) Visiom	**1**	1	**DNS**	**1**	**1**	1	162.5
2	(France) Jonathan Cochet (France) Rémy Kirchdoerffer	(Switzerland) AB Sport Auto	2	**2**	DNS				45
3	(France) Franck Dezoteux (France) Henri Dezoteux (France) Simon Dezoteux	(Italy) AF Corse						2	18
4	(France) Erwan Bastard (United States) Derek DeBoer (France) Florent Grizaud	(Switzerland) Racing Spirit of Léman						**3**	15
5	(France) Christophe Bourret (France) Pascal Gibon	(France) AKKodis ASP Team						6	12
6	(France) Laurene Godey (France) Grégory Launier (France) Sébastien Loeb	(France) Krafft Racing						15	10
3A2
1	(Belgium) Amaury Bonduel (Mexico) Alfredo Hernandez	(Belgium) BDR Competition Grupo Prom		WD				**7**	25
3B
1	(France) Miguel Moiola	(France) Vortex V8	8	6	**6**		**5**	**10**	137.5
2	(France) Lorina Padovani	(France) Vortex V8	11	6	WD		7	18	91.5
3	(France) Roland Marchix	(France) XP Racing	**Ret**	10	8	**7**		Ret	90.5
4	(France) Vincent Congnet	(France) Vortex V8	8		**6**		**5**		75
4	(France) Philippe Bonnel	(France) Vortex V8			**6**		**5**	**10**	75
5	(France) Philippe Papin	(France) XP Racing	**Ret**		8	**7**	WD	Ret	68
6	(France) Solenn Amrouche	(France) Vortex V8	11		Ret		7	18	54
7	(France) Cyril Calmon	(France) Vortex V8	8					**10**	50
8	(France) Xavier Pompidou	(France) XP Racing				**7**	WD	Ret	50
9	(France) Lionel Amrouche	(France) Vortex V8		**7**			7		45
10	(France) Karl Pedraza	(France) XP Racing	**Ret**	10	8		WD		40.5
11	(France) Philippe Gruau	(France) Vortex V8		6					37.5
12	(France) Antoine Rizzo	(France) Vortex V8	11					18	36
13	(France) Arnaud Gomez	(France) Vortex V8		**7**	Ret				27
13	(France) Olivier Gomez	(France) Vortex V8		**7**					27
Porsche Cup
1	(France) Joffrey Dorchy (France) Mathieu Martins	(France) Martinet by Alméras	13	**3**	**1**	**2**	**2**	4	168.5
2	(France) Julien Froment	(France) Martinet by Alméras	13	**3**	**1**		**2**	4	118.5
3	(France) Lucas Walter	(France) Seb Lajoux Racing	6	4	3	5	3	8	111
4	(France) Loïc Teire	(France) GP Racing Team	7	5	2	6	4	9	97.5
5	(France) Sébastien Lajoux	(France) Seb Lajoux Racing	6	4	3		2	8	87
6	(France) Frédéric Lacore	(France) GP Racing Team	7	5	2	6		9	82.5
7	(France) Lauris Nauroy	(France) Seb Lajoux Racing		4	3	5		8	81
8	(France) Gabriel Pemeant	(France) GP Racing Team	7		2	6	4	9	75
9	(France) Olivier Favre (France) Yann Penlou	(France) 2B Autosport	5			4		11	55
10	(France) Hugo Chevalier	(France) 2B Autosport				4		11	40
11	(France) Alessandro Ghiretti	(France) Martinet by Alméras	**3**				8	Ret	37
12	(Portugal) Leandro Martins (Austria) Dieter Svepes	(Portugal) Racar Motorsport				3			36
14	(France) Cédric Mezard (France) Marius Mezard	(France) Martinet by Alméras	**3**						25
15	(France) Jean-Baptiste Simmenauer	(France) Seb Lajoux Racing				5			24
16	(France) Pierre Martinet (France) Gérard Tremblay	(France) Martinet by Alméras	9		Ret		8	Ret	20
17	(Italy) Mario Cordoni (Italy) Gianluca de Lorenzi	(Italy) GDL67 Racing	4						18
18	(Belgium) Benjamin Paque (France) Stéphane Perrin	(France) Seb Lajoux Racing						**5**	18
19	(Belgium) Giovanni Scamardi	(France) Seb Lajoux Racing					2		18
20	(France) Romain Favre	(France) 2B Autosport	5						15
21	(France) Lionel Rigaud	(France) GP Racing Team					4		15
22	(France) Laurent Cochard	(France) Seb Lajoux Racing	6						12
23	(France) Julien Fébreau	(France) Martinet by Alméras	9						8
	(France) Arthur Mathieu	(France) Martinet by Alméras			Ret				0
C4A
1	(Belgium) Daniel Waszczinsky	(France) L'Espace Bienvenue	**12**	**8**	**5**	**9**	9	12	180.5
2	(France) Régis Rego de Sebes	(France) L'Espace Bienvenue	**12**	**8**	**5**	**9**	9		155.5
3	(Belgium) Benjamin Lessennes	(France) L'Espace Bienvenue				**9**		12	75
4	(France) Nicolas Elie (France) Laurent Mogica	(France) CMR				10		Ret	36
5	(United Kingdom) Michael Simpson (United Kingdom) Freddie Tomlinson (United Kingdom) Lawrence Tomlinson	(France) CMR					**6**		25
6	(Germany) Tim Rölleke (Romania) Tudor Tudurachi	(Germany) WS Racing						**13**	18
7	(France) Philippe Cosi (France) Ahmed Henni	(France) GL Racing Team						14	15
	(France) Pascal Destembert (France) Julien Goujat	(France) Team Speedcar	WD						0
	(France) Pierre Arraou (France) Frédéric Billon	(France) Milan Competition		WD					0
C4B
1	(France) Julien Lemoine	(France) ANS Motorsport	**10**		**4**	**8**	**12**	**17**	133
2	(France) Julien Bounie (France) Marion Benoit (France) Olivier Martinez	(France) Chazel Technologie Course	14	**9**	7		11	16	116.5
3	(France) Nicolas Schatz	(France) ANS Motorsport	**10**		**4**	**8**			100
4	(France) Clément Moreno	(France) ANS Motorsport					**12**	**17**	33
5	(France) Jules Doncieux (France) Nico Ferrarin	(France) DS EVents					10		25
	(France) Michel Abattu (France) Félix Crepet (France) Stéphane Lipp (France) Guillaume Masset	(France) Chazel Technologie Course					WD		
Pos.	Drivers	Team	(France) LEC1	(Spain) NAV	(Germany) HOC	(Portugal) EST	(France) MAG	(France) LEC2	Points

==== Teams ====
Pos.	Team	(France) LEC1	(Spain) NAV	(Germany) HOC	(Portugal) EST	(France) MAG	(France) LEC2	Points
1	(France) Martinet by Alméras	**3**	**3**	**1**	**2**	**2**	4	168.75
2	(France) Visiom	**1**	1	**DNS**	**1**	**1**	1	106.25
3	(France) L'Espace Bienvenue	**12**	**8**	**5**	**9**	9	12	102.75
4	(France) Seb Lajoux Racing	6	4	3	5	3	**5**	100.5
5	(France) GP Racing Team	7	5	2	6	4	9	86.25
6	(Switzerland) ANS Motorsport	**10**		**4**	**8**	**12**	**17**	74
7	(France) Vortex V8	8	6	6		**5**	**10**	68.75
8	(France) Chazel Technologie Course	14	**9**	7		11	16	67.75
9	(France) 2B Autosport	5			4		11	55
10	(France) XP Racing	**Ret**	10	8	**7**	WD	**Ret**	46.25
11	(Portugal) Racar Motorsport				3			36
12	(France) CMR				10	**6**	Ret	31
13	(France) DS Events					10		25
14	(France) AB Sport Auto	2	**2**	DNS				22.5
15	(Italy) GDL67 Racing	4						18
16	(Italy) AF Corse						2	18
17	(Germany) WS Racing						**13**	18
18	(Switzerland) Racing Spirit of Léman						**3**	15
19	(France) GL Racing Team						14	15
20	(Belgium) BDR Competition Grupo Prom		WD				**7**	12.5
21	(France) AKKodis ASP Team						6	12
22	(France) Krafft Racing						15	10
	(France) Team Speedcar	WD						
	(France) Milan Competition		WD					
Pos.	Team	(France) LEC1	(Spain) NAV	(Germany) HOC	(Portugal) EST	(France) MAG	(France) LEC2	Points

== Sprint GT Touring Challenge ==
The Sprint GT Touring Challenge is open to GT3, GT4, single-make series (Porsche Carrera Cup, Ferrari Challenge, Lamborghini Super Trofeo), TCR cars.

=== Teams and drivers ===
Team	Chassis	Engine	No.	Drivers	Rounds
3A
(Italy) SR&R SRL	Ferrari 488 GT3 Evo 2020	Ferrari 3.9 L Twin-Turbo V8	1	(Italy) Lorenzo Bontempelli	1
(Italy) SR&R SRL	Ferrari 488 GT3 Evo 2020	Ferrari 3.9 L Twin-Turbo V8	1	(China) Kang Ling	1
(France) Visiom	Ferrari 488 GT3 Evo 2020	Ferrari 3.9 L Twin-Turbo V8	1	(France) Anthony Beltoise	1
(Switzerland) Racing Spirit of Léman	Aston Martin Vantage AMR GT3	Aston Martin 4.0 L Turbo V8	10	(France) Victor Weyrich	6
(France) Rosel Racing by L'Espace Bienvenue	BMW M6 GT3	BMW 4.4 L Twin-Turbo V8	17	(Belgium) Benjamin Lessennes	6
(France) Racetivity	Ford GT GT3	Ford 5.0 L V8	20	(France) Eric Debard	5–6
(France) Racetivity	Ford GT GT3	Ford 5.0 L V8	20	(France) Simon Gachet	5–6
(Switzerland) G2 Racing	Mercedes-AMG GT3 Evo	Mercedes-AMG M159 6.2 L V8	29	(Switzerland) Christian Gell	3
(France) AB Sport Auto	Renault R.S. 01 F GT3	Nissan VR38DETT 3.0 L V6	44	(France) Warren Teneketzian	1, 6
(France) AB Sport Auto	Renault R.S. 01 F GT3	Nissan VR38DETT 3.0 L V6	44	(France) William Teneketzian	1
(France) AB Sport Auto	Renault R.S. 01 F GT3	Nissan VR38DETT 3.0 L V6	45	(France) Frank Thybaud	1, 3–6
(France) AB Sport Auto	Renault R.S. 01 F GT3	Nissan VR38DETT 3.0 L V6	63	(France) Nicolas Falda	1, 6
(France) AB Sport Auto	Renault R.S. 01 F GT3	Nissan VR38DETT 3.0 L V6	63	(Switzerland) Tiziano Carugati	1
(France) JRM Racing Team	Corvette C7 GT3-R	Chevrolet 6.2 L V8	49	(France) Olivier Morihain	1, 3, 5–6
(Italy) AF Corse	Ferrari 488 GT3 Evo 2020	Ferrari 3.9 L Twin-Turbo V8	51	(Italy) Gabriele Marotta	6
(France) CMR	Bentley Continental GT3	Bentley 4.0 L Turbo V8	88	(France) Eric Mouez	All
(France) CMR	Bentley Continental GT3	Bentley 4.0 L Turbo V8	88	(France) Georges Cabanne	1
(France) CMR	Bentley Continental GT3	Bentley 4.0 L Turbo V8	88	(France) Jean-Marc Bachelier	4
(France) CMR	Bentley Continental GT3	Bentley 4.0 L Turbo V8	88	(France) Thierry Soave	6
(France) CMR	Bentley Continental GT3	Bentley 4.0 L Turbo V8	170	(France) Jeremy Colançon	6
(France) CMR	Bentley Continental GT3	Bentley 4.0 L Turbo V8	170	(France) Philippe Colançon	6
3A2
(Belgium) BDR Competition Grupo Prom	Lamborghini Huracán Super Trofeo Evo 2	Lamborghini 5.2 L V10	28	(Belgium) Amaury Bonduel	1, 5–6
(Belgium) BDR Competition Grupo Prom	Lamborghini Huracán Super Trofeo Evo 2	Lamborghini 5.2 L V10	55	(Belgium) Serge Doms	1–2
(Belgium) BDR Competition Grupo Prom	Lamborghini Huracán Super Trofeo Evo 2	Lamborghini 5.2 L V10	77	(Mexico) Alfredo Hernandez	All
(France) CMR	Lamborghini Huracán Super Trofeo Evo 2	Lamborghini 5.2 L V10	30	(France) George Cabannes	5–6
(France) CMR	Lamborghini Huracán Super Trofeo Evo 2	Lamborghini 5.2 L V10	30	(France) Enzo Géraci	5
(France) CMR	Lamborghini Huracán Super Trofeo Evo 2	Lamborghini 5.2 L V10	30	(France) Franck Leherpeur	6
3B
(Italy) SR&R SRL	Ferrari 488 Challenge Evo	Ferrari 3.9 L Turbo V8	2	(Italy) "Aramis"	6
(Italy) SR&R SRL	Ferrari 488 Challenge Evo	Ferrari 3.9 L Turbo V8	2	(Italy) Lorenzo Cossu	6
(Italy) SR&R SRL	Ferrari 488 Challenge Evo	Ferrari 3.9 L Turbo V8	13	(Italy) Alex Bacci	1–4
(Italy) SR&R SRL	Ferrari 488 Challenge Evo	Ferrari 3.9 L Turbo V8	13	(Italy) Lorenzo Cossu	1–4
(Italy) SR&R SRL	Ferrari 488 Challenge	Ferrari 3.9 L Turbo V8	33	(Italy) Francesco Atzori	All
(Italy) SR&R SRL	Ferrari 488 Challenge	Ferrari 3.9 L Turbo V8	33	(Italy) Edoardo Barbolini	All
(Italy) SR&R SRL	Ferrari 458 Challenge	Ferrari 4.5 L V8	34	(Italy) Alfredo Salerno	1
(Italy) SR&R SRL	Ferrari 458 Challenge	Ferrari 4.5 L V8	34	(Italy) Manuel Manichini	2–3
(Italy) SR&R SRL	Ferrari 458 Challenge	Ferrari 4.5 L V8	34	(Italy) "Aramis"	2, 5
(Italy) SR&R SRL	Ferrari 458 Challenge	Ferrari 4.5 L V8	34	(Italy) Umberto D'Amato	3
(Italy) SR&R SRL	Ferrari 458 Challenge	Ferrari 4.5 L V8	34	(Italy) Lorenzo Cossu	5
(Italy) SR&R SRL	Ferrari F430 Challenge	Ferrari 4.3 L V8	43	(Italy) "Aramis"	1, 3
(France) CMR	Ferrari 488 Challenge Evo	Ferrari 3.9 L Turbo V8	73	(France) Patrick Michellier	1, 4–6
(France) CMR	Ferrari 488 Challenge Evo	Ferrari 3.9 L Turbo V8	73	(France) Alexis Berthet	1, 5–6
(Switzerland) Racing Spirit of Léman	Ferrari 488 Challenge Evo	Ferrari 3.9 L Turbo V8	91	(France) Frédéric Lacore	3, 5–6
(Switzerland) Racing Spirit of Léman	Ferrari 488 Challenge Evo	Ferrari 3.9 L Turbo V8	91	(France) Alexandre Delaye	3, 6
(France) Vortex V8	Vortex 1.0	Chevrolet 6.2 L V8	702	(France) Lionel Amrouche	2
(France) Vortex V8	Vortex 1.0	Chevrolet 6.2 L V8	702	(France) Philippe Bonnel	2
Porsche Cup
(France) 2B Autosport	Porsche 992 GT3 Cup	Porsche 4.0 L Flat-6	7	(France) Olivier Favre	2
(France) 2B Autosport	Porsche 992 GT3 Cup	Porsche 4.0 L Flat-6	7	(France) Romain Favre	2
(Switzerland) Mirage Racing	Porsche 991 GT3 Cup	Porsche 4.0 L Flat-6	21	(France) Jean-Jacques Ardilly	6
(Switzerland) Mirage Racing	Porsche 991 GT3 Cup	Porsche 4.0 L Flat-6	21	(France) Thibaud Carrai	6
(France) Seb Lajoux Racing	Porsche 992 GT3 Cup	Porsche 4.0 L Flat-6	30	(France) Lionel Rigaud	3
(France) Seb Lajoux Racing	Porsche 992 GT3 Cup	Porsche 4.0 L Flat-6	30	(France) David Sarny	3
(France) Seb Lajoux Racing	Porsche 992 GT3 Cup	Porsche 4.0 L Flat-6	48	(France) Jérémy Faligand	All
(France) Seb Lajoux Racing	Porsche 992 GT3 Cup	Porsche 4.0 L Flat-6	84	(France) Sébastien Lajoux	5
(France) Seb Lajoux Racing	Porsche 992 GT3 Cup	Porsche 4.0 L Flat-6	84	(Belgium) Giovanni Scamardi	5
(France) Seb Lajoux Racing	Porsche 992 GT3 Cup	Porsche 4.0 L Flat-6	84	(France) Quentin Antonel	6
(France) Seb Lajoux Racing	Porsche 992 GT3 Cup	Porsche 4.0 L Flat-6	99	(France) Sébastien Lajoux	3
(France) Seb Lajoux Racing	Porsche 992 GT3 Cup	Porsche 4.0 L Flat-6	99	(Belgium) Giovanni Scamardi	3
(France) Team Clairet Sport	Porsche 992 GT3 Cup	Porsche 4.0 L Flat-6	66	(France) Gilles Colombani	1
(Germany) HRT Performance	Porsche 992 GT3 Cup	Porsche 4.0 L Flat-6	68	(Germany) Tim Stender	3
(Germany) HRT Performance	Porsche 992 GT3 Cup	Porsche 4.0 L Flat-6	69	(Germany) Holger Harmsen	3
(France) Breizh Motorsport	Porsche 991 GT3 Cup	Porsche 4.0 L Flat-6	82	(France) Maxime Mainguy	1–3
(France) Breizh Motorsport	Porsche 991 GT3 Cup	Porsche 4.0 L Flat-6	82	(France) Christophe Guérin	2
(France) GP Racing Team	Porsche 992 GT3 Cup	Porsche 4.0 L Flat-6	89	(France) Gabriel Pemeant	3
(France) GP Racing Team	Porsche 992 GT3 Cup	Porsche 4.0 L Flat-6	89	(France) Loïc Teire	3
(Portugal) Racar Motorsport	Porsche 992 GT3 Cup	Porsche 4.0 L Flat-6	911	(Portugal) Leandro Martins	4
(Portugal) Racar Motorsport	Porsche 992 GT3 Cup	Porsche 4.0 L Flat-6	911	(Austria) Dieter Svepes	4
(France) Krafft Racing	Porsche 992 GT3 Cup	Porsche 4.0 L Flat-6	911	(France) Evan Meunier	5
C4A
(France) Team Speedcar	Alpine A110 GT4	Alpine 1.8 L I4	2	(France) "Bernard"	1–3
(France) Team Speedcar	Audi R8 LMS GT4 Evo	Audi 5.2 L V10	32	(France) Julien Goujat	1–2, 4, 6
(France) Team Speedcar	Audi R8 LMS GT4 Evo	Audi 5.2 L V10	32	(France) Maxime Sonntag	6
(France) Team Speedcar	Ginetta G55 Supercup	Ford 3.7 L V6	303	(France) David Levy	1
(France) Team Speedcar	Ginetta G55 Supercup	Ford 3.7 L V6	303	(Netherlands) Senna van Walstijn	1
(France) Rosel Racing by L'Espace Bienvenue	BMW M4 GT4 Gen II	BMW 3.0 L Twin-Turbo I6	17	(France) Grégory Launier	1–5
(France) CMR	Porsche 718 Cayman GT4 Clubsport	Porsche 3.8 L Flat-6	30	(France) Nicolas Prost	1–2
(France) CMR	Porsche 718 Cayman GT4 Clubsport	Porsche 3.8 L Flat-6	30	(Netherlands) Florian van Dooren	1
(France) DS Events	Porsche 718 Cayman GT4 Clubsport	Porsche 3.8 L Flat-6	57	(France) André Zaphiratos	6
(France) Milan Competition	Audi R8 LMS GT4 Evo	Audi 5.2 L V10	64	(France) Pierre Arraou	1, 3–5
(France) Herrero Racing	Audi R8 LMS GT4 Evo	Audi 5.2 L V10	64	(France) Pierre Arraou	6
(France) Breizh Motorsport	BMW 235i Racing	BMW 3.0 L I6	79	(France) Florent Averty	2
(France) CSA Racing	Audi R8 LMS GT4 Evo	Audi 5.2 L V10	777	(France) Bastien Ostian	1
(France) CSA Racing	Audi R8 LMS GT4 Evo	Audi 5.2 L V10	777	(France) Kévin Chanas	1
C4B
(France) Team Speedcar	Alpine A110 GT4	Alpine 1.8 L I4	2	(France) "Bernard"	4
(France) Team Speedcar	Mitjet BMW	Renault 3.5 L V6	40	(France) Serge Nauges	1–5
(France) Team Speedcar	Ginetta G55 Supercup	Ford 3.7 L V6	555	(Belgium) François Denis	All
(France) Team Speedcar	Ginetta G55 Supercup	Ford 3.7 L V6	555	(France) Emilie Alberny	2
(France) Team Speedcar	Ginetta G55 Supercup	Ford 3.7 L V6	555	(Belgium) Samuel Denis	6
(France) Chazel Technologie Course	Alpine A110 Cup	Alpine 1.4 L I4	7	(France) Alain Jacono	1
(France) Chazel Technologie Course	Alpine A110 Cup	Alpine 1.4 L I4	11	(Belgium) Lorens Lecertua	1
(France) Chazel Technologie Course	Alpine A110 Cup	Alpine 1.4 L I4	136	(France) Enzo Géraci	1
(France) CD Sport	Ligier JS2 R	Ford 3.7 L V6	87	(France) Gérard Faure	5–6
(France) Turbo 2000	Ginetta G50	Ford Cyclone 3.5 L V6	123	(France) Mickaël Lahais	1
(France) Turbo 2000	Ginetta G50	Ford Cyclone 3.5 L V6	123	(France) Laurent Mayet	1
TCR
(France) Turbo 2000	Opel Astra TCR	Opel 2.0 L I4	321	(France) Cyril Andrey	1
(France) Turbo 2000	Opel Astra TCR	Opel 2.0 L I4	321	(France) Didier Pierrard	1
Invitational
(France) Racetivity	Audi R13 DTM	Audi 4.0 L V8	4	(France) Edouard Cauhaupé	2
(France) Racetivity	Audi R13 DTM	Audi 4.0 L V8	4	(France) Eric Debard	2

=== Race results ===
Bold indicates overall winner.

Round		Circuit	Pole Position	3A/3A2 Winning Car	3B Winning Car	Porsche Cup Winning Car	C4A Winning Car	C4B Winning Car	INV Winning Car
Round		Circuit	Pole Position	3A/3A2 Winning Drivers	3B Winning Drivers	Porsche Cup Winning Drivers	C4A Winning Drivers	C4B Winning Drivers	INV Winning Drivers
1	R1	(France) Paul Ricard	(Belgium) No. 28 BDR Competition Grupo Prom	3A: **(Italy) No. 1 SR&R SRL**; 3A2: (Belgium) No. 28 BDR Competition Grupo Prom	(Italy) No. 33 SR&R SRL	(France) No. 48 Seb Lajoux Racing	(France) No. 17 Rosel Racing by L'Espace Bienvenue	(France) No. 136 Chazel Technologie Course	No entries
1	R1	(France) Paul Ricard	(Belgium) Amaury Bonduel	3A: **(Italy) Lorenzo Bontempelli**; 3A2: (Belgium) Amaury Bonduel	(Italy) Franceso Atzori	(France) Jérémy Faligand	(France) Grégory Launier	(France) Enzo Géraci	No entries
1	R2	(France) Paul Ricard	(Belgium) No. 28 BDR Competition Grupo Prom	3A: **(Italy) No. 1 SR&R SRL**; 3A2: (Belgium) No. 28 BDR Competition Grupo Prom	(Italy) No. 33 SR&R SRL	(France) No. 82 Breizh Motorsport	(France) No. 17 Rosel Racing by L'Espace Bienvenue	(France) No. 11 Chazel Technologie Course	No entries
1	R2	(France) Paul Ricard	(Belgium) Amaury Bonduel	3A: **(China) Kang Ling**; 3A2: (Belgium) Amaury Bonduel	(Italy) Eduardo Barbolini	(France) Maxime Mainguy	(France) Grégory Launier	(Belgium) Lorens Lecertua	No entries
1	R3	(France) Paul Ricard		3A: **(Italy) No. 1 SR&R SRL**; 3A2: (Belgium) No. 77 BDR Competition Grupo Prom	(Italy) No. 13 SR&R SRL	(France) No. 82 Breizh Motorsport	(France) No. 30 CMR	(France) No. 136 Chazel Technologie Course	No entries
1	R3	(France) Paul Ricard		3A: **(Italy) Lorenzo Bontempelli**; 3A: **(China) Kang Ling**; 3A2: (Mexico) Alfredo Hernandez	(Italy) Alex Bacci (Italy) Lorenzo Cossu	(France) Maxime Mainguy	(France) Nicolas Prost (Netherlands) Florian van Dooren	(France) Enzo Géraci	No entries
2	R1	(Spain) Circuito de Navarra	(France) No. 4 Racetivity	3A: (France) No. 88 CMR; 3A2: (Belgium) No. 77 BDR Competition Grupo Prom	(Italy) No. 33 SR&R SRL	(France) No. 82 Breizh Motorsport	(France) No. 17 Rosel Racing by L'Espace Bienvenue	(France) No. 555 Team Speedcar	**(France) No. 4 Racetivity**
2	R1	(Spain) Circuito de Navarra	(France) Edouard Cauhaupé	3A: (France) Eric Mouez; 3A2: (Mexico) Alfredo Hernandez	(Italy) Franceso Atzori	(France) Maxime Mainguy	(France) Grégory Launier	(Belgium) François Denis	**(France) Edouard Cauhaupé**
2	R2	(Spain) Circuito de Navarra	(France) No. 4 Racetivity	3A: (France) No. 88 CMR; 3A2: (Belgium) No. 77 BDR Competition Grupo Prom	(Italy) No. 13 SR&R SRL	(France) No. 48 Seb Lajoux Racing	(France) No. 17 Rosel Racing by L'Espace Bienvenue	(France) No. 40 Team Speedcar	**(France) No. 4 Racetivity**
2	R2	(Spain) Circuito de Navarra	(France) Eric Debard	3A: (France) Eric Mouez; 3A2: (Mexico) Alfredo Hernandez	(Italy) Alex Bacci	(France) Jérémy Faligand	(France) Grégory Launier	(France) Serge Nauges	**(France) Eric Debard**
2	R3	(Spain) Circuito de Navarra		3A: (France) No. 88 CMR; 3A2: (Belgium) No. 77 BDR Competition Grupo Prom	(Italy) No. 33 SR&R SRL	(France) No. 48 Seb Lajoux Racing	(France) No. 17 Rosel Racing by L'Espace Bienvenue	(France) No. 40 Team Speedcar	**(France) No. 4 Racetivity**
2	R3	(Spain) Circuito de Navarra		3A: (France) Eric Mouez; 3A2: (Mexico) Alfredo Hernandez	(Italy) Franceso Atzori (Italy) Eduardo Barbolini	(France) Jérémy Faligand	(France) Grégory Launier	(France) Serge Nauges	**(France) Edouard Cauhaupé** **(France) Eric Debard**
3	R1	(Germany) Hockenheimring	(Switzerland) No. 29 G2 Racing	3A: **(Switzerland) No. 29 G2 Racing**; 3A2: (Belgium) No. 77 BDR Competition Grupo Prom	(Italy) No. 33 SR&R SRL	(France) No. 99 Seb Lajoux Racing	(France) No. 17 Rosel Racing by L'Espace Bienvenue	(France) No. 555 Team Speedcar	No entries
3	R1	(Germany) Hockenheimring	(Switzerland) Christian Gell	3A: **(Switzerland) Christian Gell**; 3A2: (Mexico) Alfredo Hernandez	(Italy) Franceso Atzori	(France) Sébastien Lajoux	(France) Grégory Launier	(Belgium) François Denis	No entries
3	R2	(Germany) Hockenheimring	(Switzerland) No. 29 G2 Racing	3A: **(Switzerland) No. 29 G2 Racing**; 3A2: (Belgium) No. 77 BDR Competition Grupo Prom	(Italy) No. 13 SR&R SRL	(Germany) No. 68 HRT Performance	(France) No. 17 Rosel Racing by L'Espace Bienvenue	(France) No. 555 Team Speedcar	No entries
3	R2	(Germany) Hockenheimring	(Switzerland) Christian Gell	3A: **(Switzerland) Christian Gell**; 3A2: (Mexico) Alfredo Hernandez	(Italy) Alex Bacci	(Germany) Tim Stender	(France) Grégory Launier	(Belgium) François Denis	No entries
3	R3	(Germany) Hockenheimring		3A: (Switzerland) No. 45 AB Sport Auto; 3A2: (Belgium) No. 77 BDR Competition Grupo Prom	(Italy) No. 33 SR&R SRL	**(France) No. 99 Seb Lajoux Racing**	(France) No. 17 Rosel Racing by L'Espace Bienvenue	(France) No. 555 Team Speedcar	No entries
3	R3	(Germany) Hockenheimring		3A: (Switzerland) Frank Thybaud; 3A2: (Mexico) Alfredo Hernandez	(Italy) Franceso Atzori (Italy) Eduardo Barbolini	**(France) Sébastien Lajoux** **(Belgium) Giovanni Scamardi**	(France) Grégory Launier	(Belgium) François Denis	No entries
4	R1	(Portugal) Circuito do Estoril	(France) No. 7 2B Autosport	3A: (France) No. 88 CMR; 3A2: (Belgium) No. 77 BDR Competition Grupo Prom	(France) No. 73 CMR	**(France) No. 7 2B Autosport**	(France) No. 32 Speedcar	(France) No. 555 Team Speedcar	No entries
4	R1	(Portugal) Circuito do Estoril	(France) Romain Favre	3A: (France) Jean-Marc Bachelier; 3A2: (Mexico) Alfredo Hernandez	(France) Patrick Michellier	**(France) Romain Favre**	(France) Julien Goujat	(Belgium) François Denis	No entries
4	R2	(Portugal) Circuito do Estoril	(France) No. 7 2B Autosport	3A: (France) No. 88 CMR; 3A2: (Belgium) No. 77 BDR Competition Grupo Prom	(Italy) No. 33 SR&R SRL	**(Portugal) No. 911 Racar Motorsport**	(France) No. 17 Rosel Racing by L'Espace Bienvenue	(France) No. 555 Team Speedcar	No entries
4	R2	(Portugal) Circuito do Estoril	(France) Romain Favre	3A: (France) Jean-Marc Bachelier; 3A2: (Mexico) Alfredo Hernandez	(Italy) Eduardo Barbolini	**(Austria) Dieter Svepes**	(France) Grégory Launier	(Belgium) François Denis	No entries
4	R3	(Portugal) Circuito do Estoril		3A: (Switzerland) No. 45 AB Sport Auto; 3A2: (Belgium) No. 77 BDR Competition Grupo Prom	(Italy) No. 33 SR&R SRL	**(Portugal) No. 911 Racar Motorsport**	(France) No. 17 Rosel Racing by L'Espace Bienvenue	(France) No. 40 Team Speedcar	No entries
4	R3	(Portugal) Circuito do Estoril		3A: (France) Frank Thybaud; 3A2: (Mexico) Alfredo Hernandez	(Italy) Franceso Atzori (Italy) Eduardo Barbolini	**(Portugal) Leandro Martins** **(Austria) Dieter Svepes**	(France) Grégory Launier	(France) Serge Nauges	No entries
5	R1	(France) Magny-Cours	(Belgium) No. 28 BDR Competition Grupo Prom	3A: (France) No. 20 Racetivity; 3A2: **(Belgium) No. 28 BDR Competition Grupo Prom**	(Italy) No. 33 SR&R	(France) No. 84 Seb Lajoux Racing	(France) No. 17 Rosel Racing by L'Espace Bienvenue	(France) No. 40 Team Speedcar	No entries
5	R1	(France) Magny-Cours	(Belgium) Amaury Bonduel	3A: (France) Simon Gachet; 3A2: **(Belgium) Amaury Bonduel**	(Italy) Franceso Atzori	(France) Sébastien Lajoux	(France) Grégory Launier	(France) Serge Nauges	No entries
5	R2	(France) Magny-Cours	(Belgium) No. 28 BDR Competition Grupo Prom	3A: (France) No. 20 Racetivity; 3A2: **(Belgium) No. 28 BDR Competition Grupo Prom**	(France) No. 73 CMR	(France) No. 911 Krafft Racing	(France) No. 64 Milan Competition	(France) No. 555 Team Speedcar	No entries
5	R2	(France) Magny-Cours	(Belgium) Amaury Bonduel	3A: (France) Eric Debard; 3A2: **(Belgium) Amaury Bonduel**	(France) Patrick Michellier	(France) Evan Meunier	(France) Pierre Arraou	(Belgium) François Denis	No entries
5	R3	(France) Magny-Cours		3A: (France) No. 20 Racetivity; 3A2: **(Belgium) No. 28 BDR Competition Grupo Prom**	(France) No. 73 CMR	(France) No. 84 Seb Lajoux Racing	(France) No. 17 Rosel Racing by L'Espace Bienvenue	(France) No. 87 CD Sport	No entries
5	R3	(France) Magny-Cours		3A: (France) Eric Debard; 3A: (France) Simon Gachet; 3A2: **(Belgium) Amaury Bonduel**	(France) Alexis Berthet (France) Patrick Michellier	(France) Sébastien Lajoux (Belgium) Giovanni Scamardi	(France) Grégory Launier	(France) Gérard Faure	No entries
6	R1	(France) Paul Ricard	(France) No. 17 Rosel Racing by L'Espace Bienvenue	3A: **(France) No. 17 Rosel Racing by L'Espace Bienvenue**; 3A2: (Belgium) No. 28 BDR Competition Grupo Prom	(Italy) No. 33 SR&R	(France) No. 84 Seb Lajoux Racing	(France) No. 32 Speedcar	(France) No. 555 Team Speedcar	No entries
6	R1	(France) Paul Ricard	(Belgium) Benjamin Lessennes	3A: **(Belgium) Benjamin Lessennes**; 3A2: (Belgium) Amaury Bonduel	(Italy) Franceso Atzori	(France) Quentin Antonel	(France) Maxime Sonntag	(Belgium) François Denis	No entries
6	R2	(France) Paul Ricard	(France) No. 17 Rosel Racing by L'Espace Bienvenue	3A: **(France) No. 17 Rosel Racing by L'Espace Bienvenue**; 3A2: (Belgium) No. 28 BDR Competition Grupo Prom	(Switzerland) No. 91 Racing Spirit of Léman	(France) No. 48 Seb Lajoux Racing	(France) No. 32 Speedcar	(France) No. 87 CD Sport	No entries
6	R2	(France) Paul Ricard	(Belgium) Benjamin Lessennes	3A: **(Belgium) Benjamin Lessennes**; 3A2: (Belgium) Amaury Bonduel	(France) Frédéric Lacore	(France) Jérémy Faligand	(France) Julien Goujat	(France) Gérard Faure	No entries
6	R3	(France) Paul Ricard		3A: **(Switzerland) No. 44 AB Sport Auto**; 3A2: (Belgium) No. 77 BDR Competition Grupo Prom	(Switzerland) No. 91 Racing Spirit of Léman	(France) No. 84 Seb Lajoux Racing	(France) No. 32 Speedcar	(France) No. 87 CD Sport	No entries
6	R3	(France) Paul Ricard		3A: **(France) Warren Teneketzian**; 3A2: (Belgium) Amaury Bonduel	(France) Alexandre Delaye (France) Frédéric Lacore	(France) Quentin Antonel	(France) Julien Goujat (France) Maxime Sonntag	(France) Gérard Faure	No entries

=== Championship standings ===
==== Classes ====
Pos.	Drivers	Team	(France) LEC1			(Spain) NAV			(Germany) HOC			(Portugal) EST			(France) MAG			(France) LEC2			Points
3A
1	(France) Eric Mouez	(France) CMR	5		10	**4**	**14**	8	10	Ret	11		7	11	11	14	7	9		8	264
2	(France) Frank Thybaud	(France) AB Sport Auto	9	7	5				12	7	7	**Ret**	**8**	6	12	15	9	DNS	DNS	12	185
3	(France) Jean-Marc Bachelier	(France) CMR										7		11							80
4	(France) Eric Debard	(France) Racetivity														**2**	4	4		6	78
5	(France) Simon Gachet	(France) Racetivity													**3**		4		6	6	76
6	(France) Warren Teneketzian	(France) AB Sport Auto	**3**		Ret													3	2	1	56
7	(Italy) Lorenzo Bontempelli	(Italy) SR&R SRL	1		1																48
8	(China) Kang Ling	(Italy) SR&R SRL		**1**	1																48
9	(France) Nicolas Falda	(France) AB Sport Auto		Ret	6													11	7		41
10	(Belgium) Benjamin Lessennes	(France) Rosel Racing by L'Espace Bienvenue																**1**	**1**	2	40
11	(Switzerland) Christian Gell	(Switzerland) G2 Racing AG							**1**	**1**	17										36
12	(Switzerland) Tiziano Carugati	(France) AB Sport Auto	6		6																28
13	(France) Georges Cabanne	(France) CMR		21	10																26
14	(France) Thierry Soave	(France) CMR																	4	8	22
15	(France) Olivier Morihain	(France) JRM Racing Team	DNS	DNS	DNS				11	10	DNS				DNS	DNS	DNS	10	DNS	Ret	13
16	(Italy) Gabriele Marotta	(Italy) AF Corse																15	DNS	11	8.5
17	(France) Victor Weyrich	(Switzerland) Racing Spirit of Léman																14	DNS	DNS	1
	(France) William Teneketzian	(France) AB Sport Auto		Ret	Ret																0
	(France) Anthony Beltoise	(France) Visiom																DNS	DNS	DNS	0
	(France) Philippe Colançon	(France) CMR																DNS		DNS	0
	(France) Jeremy Colançon	(France) CMR																	DNS	DNS	0
3A2
1	(Mexico) Alfredo Hernandez	(Belgium) BDR Competition Grupo Prom	4	5	2	**2**	**2**	2	**7**	**5**	6	**3**	**3**	2	7	3	2	6	5	5	331
2	(Belgium) Amaury Bonduel	(Belgium) BDR Competition Grupo Prom	**2**	**2**	Ret										**1**	**1**	1	**2**	**3**	3	112
3	(Belgium) Serge Doms	(Belgium) BDR Competition Grupo Prom	11	8	12	11	5	10													88
4	(France) Georges Cabanne	(France) CMR														8	Ret	20		DNS	20
5	(France) Enzo Géraci	(France) CMR													2		Ret				12
	(France) Franck Leherpeur	(France) CMR																	DNS	DNS	0
3B
1	(Italy) Francesco Atzori	(Italy) SR&R SRL	**7**		11	**5**		4	**4**		5	**12**		3	**5**		8	**5**		17	324
2	(Italy) Edoardo Barbolini	(Italy) SR&R SRL		5	11		7	4		13	5		4	3		13	8		9	17	310
3	(Italy) Lorenzo Cossu	(Italy) SR&R SRL	8		7	8		5	14		9	13		5		17	DNS		12	15	237
4	(Italy) Alex Bacci	(Italy) SR&R SRL		**6**	7		**4**	5		**6**	9		5	5							212
5	(France) Frédéric Lacore	(Switzerland) Racing Spirit of Léman							16		8				10	**8**	13		8	10	113
6	(France) Alexandre Delaye	(Switzerland) Racing Spirit of Léman								11	8							12		10	80
7	(France) Patrick Michellier	(France) CMR		DNS	DNS							5	**DNS**	DNS		5	5	21		DNS	74
8	(Italy) "Aramis"	(Italy) SR&R SRL	24	DNS	DNS	15		DNS	DNS	DNS	DNS				24		DNS	22		15	56
9	(France) Lionel Amrouche	(France) Vortex V8				7		6													48
10	(France) Alexis Berthet	(France) CMR	Ret		DNS										9		5		**DNS**	DNS	44
11	(Italy) Manuel Manichini	(Italy) SR&R SRL					8	DNS		DNS	15										31
12	(France) Olivier Gomez	(France) Vortex V8					Ret	6													30
13	(Italy) Umberto D'Amato	(Italy) SR&R SRL							19		15										24
14	(Italy) Alfredo Salerno	(Italy) SR&R SRL	13	DNS	DNS																5
Porsche Cup
1	(France) Jérémy Faligand	(France) Seb Lajoux Racing	10	Ret	8	**6**	**3**	3	5	8	Ret	2	6	4	6	7	Ret	8	10	9	225
2	(France) Maxime Mainguy	(France) Breizh Motorsport	**DSQ**	**3**	3	3		6	6	3	4										126
3	(France) Sébastien Lajoux	(France) Seb Lajoux Racing							**2**		1				**4**		3				97
4	(Austria) Dieter Svepes	(Portugal) Racar Motorsport											1	1							96
5	(Austria) Leonardo Martins	(Portugal) Racar Motorsport										6		1							84
6	(Belgium) Giovanni Scamardi	(France) Seb Lajoux Racing								**15**	1					**6**	3				78
7	(France) Christophe Guérin	(France) Breizh Motorsport					6	6													54
8	(France) Quentin Antonel	(France) Seb Lajoux Racing																**7**	**Ret**	4	40
9	(Germany) Tim Stender	(Germany) HRT Performance							3	2	2										38
10	(France) Evan Meunier	(France) Krafft Racing													8	4	6				37
11	(France) Gilles Colombani	(France) Team Clairet Sport	25	9	4																36
12	(France) Thibaud Carrai	(France) Mirage Racing																13		18	30
13	(France) Romain Favre	(France) 2B Autosport										**1**	**2**	DNS							28
14	(France) David Sarny	(France) Seb Lajoux Racing							8		3										26
15	(France) Lionel Rigaud	(France) Seb Lajoux Racing								12	3										24
16	(France) Jean-Jacques Adrilly	(France) Mirage Racing																	NC	18	20
17	(Germany) Holger Harmsen	(Germany) HRT Performance							9	4	16										19
18	(France) Gabriel Pemeant	(France) GP Racing Team							13		DNS										6
19	(France) Loïc Teire	(France) GP Racing Team								9	DNS										2
C4A
1	(France) Grégory Launier	(France) Rosel Racing by L'Espace Bienvenue	14	12	14	**9**	**9**	9	**15**	**14**	10	10	9	7	**13**	11	10				296
2	(France) Pierre Arraou	(France) Milan Competition	17	17	17				17	17	13	9	11	9	14	**10**	12				187
2	(France) Pierre Arraou	(France) Herrero Racing																18	DNS	16	187
3	(France) Julien Goujat	(France) Team Speedcar	15	15	15	10	10	Ret				**8**	**Ret**	8					**11**	13	112
4	(France) "Bernard"	(France) Team Speedcar	18	18	18	12	11	14	21	18	14										86
5	(France) Maxime Sonntag	(France) DS Events																**14**		13	48
6	(Netherlands) Florian van Dooren	(France) CMR		**13**	9																44
7	(France) Nicolas Prost	(France) CMR	**16**		9	DNS	DNS	DNS													42
8	(France) Florent Averty	(France) Breizh Motorsport				16	Ret	13													42
9	(France) André Zaphiratos	(France) DS Events																19	13	14	35
8	(France) Bastien Ostian	(France) CSA Racing	21		20																12
9	(Netherlands) Senna van Walstijn	(France) Team Speedcar		14	Ret																10
10	(France) Kévin Chanas	(France) CSA Racing		Ret	20																7
	(France) David Levy	(France) Team Speedcar	Ret		Ret																0
C4B
1	(Belgium) François Denis	(France) Team Speedcar	19	16	16	**13**		12	**18**	**16**	12	**6**	**10**	12	**16**	**12**	Ret	**17**		DNS	253
2	(France) Serge Nauges	(France) Team Speedcar	Ret	19	19	14	**12**	11	20	19	Ret	11	12	9	15	16	DNS				207
3	(France) Gérard Faure	(France) CD Sport													Ret	Ret	11	23	14	19	78
4	(France) Emilie Alberny	(France) Team Speedcar					13	12													54
5	(France) Enzo Géraci	(France) Chazel Technologie Course	**12**	**11**	13																46
6	(France) Mickaël Lahais	(France) Turbo 2000	23		21																24
7	(France) Laurent Mayet	(France) Turbo 2000		20	21																22
8	(France) "Bernard"	(France) Team Speedcar										11	13	Ret							20
9	(France) Alain Jocono	(France) Chazel Technologie Course	20	Ret	22																17
10	(Belgium) Lorens Lecertua	(France) Chazel Technologie Course	Ret	10	23																16
	(Belgium) Samuel Denis	(France) Team Speedcar																	**Ret**	DNS	0
TCR
1	(France) Cyril Andrey	(France) Turbo 2000	**22**		Ret																16
	(France) Didier Pierrard	(France) Turbo 2000		**Ret**	Ret																0
Invitational drivers ineligible for points
	(France) Edouard Cauhaupé	(France) Racetivity				**1**		1													
	(France) Eric Debard	(France) Racetivity					**1**	1													
Pos.	Drivers	Team	(France) LEC1			(Spain) NAV			(Germany) HOC			(Portugal) EST			(France) MAG			(France) LEC2			Points

==== Teams ====
Pos.	Team	(France) LEC1			(Spain) NAV			(Germany) HOC			(Portugal) EST			(France) MAG			(France) LEC2			Points
1	(Italy) SR&R SRL	1	**1**	1	**5**	**4**	4	**4**	**6**	5	**12**	4	3	**5**	13	8	**5**	9	15	386
2	(France) Rosel Racing by L'Espace Bienvenue	14	12	14	**9**	**9**	9	**15**	**14**	10	10	9	7	**13**	11	10	**1**	**1**	2	328
3	(France) CMR	5	**13**	9	**4**	**14**	8	10	Ret	11	5	7	11	11	5	5	21	4	8	286
4	(France) Team Speedcar	15	16	16	**13**	**12**	11	**18**	**16**	12	**6**	**10**	9	15	**12**	Ret	**14**	**11**	13	256
5	(Belgium) BDR Competition Grupo Prom	**2**	**2**	2	**2**	**2**	2	**7**	**5**	6	**3**	**3**	2	**1**	**1**	1	**2**	**3**	3	240
6	(France) AB Sport Auto	**3**	7	5				12	7	7	**Ret**	**8**	6	12	15	9	3	2	1	240
7	(France) Seblajoux Racing	10	Ret	8	**6**	**3**	3	**3**	12	1	2	6	4	**4**	**6**	3	**7**	10	4	227
8	(Switzerland) Racing Spirit of Léman							16	11	8				10	**8**	13	12	8	10	148
9	(France) Milan Competition	17	17	17				17	17	13	9	11	9	14	**10**	12				124
10	(France) Breizh Motorsport	**DSQ**	**3**	3	3	6	6	6	3	4										117
11	(France) Racetivity				**1**	**1**	1							**3**	**2**	4	4	6	6	102
12	(France) Chazel Technologie Course	**12**	10	13																64
13	(Portugal) Racar Motorsport										6	1	1							58
14	(Switzerland) G2 Racing AG							**1**	**1**	17										52
15	(Germany) HRT Performance							3	2	2										52
16	(France) Vortex V8				7	Ret	8													48
17	(France) CD Sport													Ret	Ret	11	23	14	19	46
18	(France) Turbo 2000	**22**	20	21																32
19	(France) 2B Autosport										**1**	**2**	DNS							28
20	(France) JRM Racing Team	DNS	DNS	DNS				11	10	DNS				DNS	DNS	DNS	10	DNS	Ret	26
21	(France) Krafft Racing													8	4	6				25
22	(France) Team Clairet Sport	25	9	4																24
23	(France) DS Events																19	13	14	23
24	(France) Herrero Racing																18	DNS	16	16
25	(France) Mirage Racing																13	NC	18	15
26	(France) CSA Racing	21	Ret	20																12
27	(Italy) AF Corse																15	DNS	11	9
28	(France) GP Racing Team							13	9	DNS										8
	(France) Visiom																DNS	DNS	DNS	0
Pos.	Team	(France) LEC1			(Spain) NAV			(Germany) HOC			(Portugal) EST			(France) MAG			(France) LEC2			Points

== Challenge Monoplace ==
The Challenge Monoplace was open to Tatuus FR-19 cars in the F3R class, Tatuus FR2.0/13s in the FR2.0 class and Mygale M14-F4 and Tatuus F4 cars in the F4 class.

Graff Racing driver Paul Trojani won the F3R championship, with Formula Motorsport driver Walter Rykart victorious in the F3R Ultimate Class. CMR driver Jordan Roupnel claimed the FR2.0 championship, and Philippe Daric won in the F4 class driving for Kennol Racing Team and JRM Racing Team.

=== Teams and drivers ===
Team	No.	Drivers	U	Rounds
F3R
(France) Formula Motorsport	2	(Switzerland) Walter Rykart	U	All
(France) Formula Motorsport	5	(France) Laura Villars		1, 3–5
(France) Formula Motorsport	16	(France) Alexandra Herve		2–3
(France) Formula Motorsport	17	(France) Erwin Creed	U	1, 3
(France) Formula Motorsport	183	(Switzerland) Aubin Robert Prince		6
(France) Race Motorsport	4	(France) Frédéric Boillot	U	1, 3–6
(France) CMR	9	(France) Jordan Roupnel		4
(France) CMR	15	(Switzerland) Gaspard Le Gallais		4–6
(France) CMR	93	(Switzerland) Gaspard Le Gallais		1–3
(France) CMR	162	(Australia) Craig McLatchey	U	4–6
(France) Graff Racing	21	(France) Paul Trojani		All
(France) Graff Racing	39	(France) Eric Trouillet	U	1
(France) Graff Racing	41	(Paraguay) Miguel Garcia		1
(France) Graff Racing	66	(France) Enzo Richer		6
(Poland) Team Virage	24	(Argentina) Francisco Soldavini		4
(France) Nerguti Competition	26	(France) Alban Nerguti		1–2, 6
(France) Winfield	44	(Ukraine) Yaroslav Veselaho		6
(Switzerland) Sports-Promotion	62	(Switzerland) Christophe Hurni	U	5–6
(Switzerland) Sports-Promotion	222	(France) Marius Mezard		5–6
(France) JRM Racing Team	75	(France) Adrien Hervouet		6
FR2.0
(France) CMR	9	(France) Jordan Roupnel		1–3, 5–6
(France) Rever'Team	19	(France) Gilles Depierre	U	1, 3, 5–6
F4
(France) Formula Motorsport	3	(Luxembourg) Chester Kieffer		6
(Switzerland) SUB5ZERO	22	(Switzerland) Andreas Ritzi		3
(France) Kennol Racing Team	49	(France) Philippe Daric		1, 3, 5
(France) JRM Racing Team	49	(France) Philippe Daric		6

=== Race results ===
Round		Circuit	Pole position	Fastest lap	F3R class		FR2.0 class	F4 Class
Round		Circuit	Pole position	Fastest lap	Winning driver	Ultimate class winner	Winning driver	Winning driver
1	R1	(France) Circuit Paul Ricard	(France) Paul Trojani	(France) Paul Trojani	(France) Paul Trojani	(France) Eric Trouillet	(France) Jordan Roupnel	(France) Philippe Daric
1	R2	(France) Circuit Paul Ricard		(Switzerland) Gaspard Le Gallais	(France) Paul Trojani	(France) Eric Trouillet	(France) Jordan Roupnel	(France) Philippe Daric
1	R3	(France) Circuit Paul Ricard		(France) Paul Trojani	(France) Paul Trojani	(France) Erwin Creed	(France) Jordan Roupnel	(France) Philippe Daric
2	R1	(Spain) Circuito de Navarra	(Switzerland) Gaspard Le Gallais	(Switzerland) Gaspard Le Gallais	(Switzerland) Gaspard Le Gallais	(Switzerland) Walter Rykart	(France) Jordan Roupnel	no entries
2	R2	(Spain) Circuito de Navarra		(Switzerland) Gaspard Le Gallais	(Switzerland) Gaspard Le Gallais	(Switzerland) Walter Rykart	(France) Jordan Roupnel	no entries
2	R3	(Spain) Circuito de Navarra		(Switzerland) Gaspard Le Gallais	(France) Paul Trojani	(Switzerland) Walter Rykart	(France) Jordan Roupnel	no entries
3	R1	(Germany) Hockenheimring	(France) Paul Trojani	(France) Paul Trojani	(France) Paul Trojani	(France) Erwin Creed	(France) Jordan Roupnel	(France) Philippe Daric
3	R2	(Germany) Hockenheimring		(France) Paul Trojani	(France) Paul Trojani	(France) Erwin Creed	(France) Jordan Roupnel	(Switzerland) Andreas Ritzi
3	R3	(Germany) Hockenheimring		(France) Paul Trojani	(France) Paul Trojani	(France) Erwin Creed	(France) Jordan Roupnel	(France) Philippe Daric
4	R1	(Portugal) Circuito do Estoril	(France) Paul Trojani	(France) Paul Trojani	(Argentina) Francisco Soldavini	(France) Frédéric Boillot	no entries	no entries
4	R2	(Portugal) Circuito do Estoril		(Switzerland) Gaspard Le Gallais	(France) Paul Trojani	(Switzerland) Walter Rykart	no entries	no entries
4	R3	(Portugal) Circuito do Estoril		(Switzerland) Gaspard Le Gallais	(Switzerland) Gaspard Le Gallais	(Switzerland) Walter Rykart	no entries	no entries
5	R1	(France) Circuit de Nevers Magny-Cours	(France) Paul Trojani	(France) Paul Trojani	(France) Paul Trojani	(Switzerland) Walter Rykart	(France) Jordan Roupnel	no classified finishers
5	R2	(France) Circuit de Nevers Magny-Cours		(France) Paul Trojani	(France) Paul Trojani	(Switzerland) Walter Rykart	(France) Jordan Roupnel	no classified finishers
5	R3	(France) Circuit de Nevers Magny-Cours		(Switzerland) Gaspard Le Gallais	(France) Paul Trojani	(Switzerland) Walter Rykart	(France) Jordan Roupnel	no classified finishers
6	R1	(France) Circuit Paul Ricard	(France) Paul Trojani	(Switzerland) Gaspard Le Gallais	(France) Paul Trojani	(Switzerland) Christophe Hurni	(France) Jordan Roupnel	(Luxembourg) Chester Kieffer
6	R2	(France) Circuit Paul Ricard		(France) Paul Trojani	(France) Paul Trojani	(Switzerland) Christophe Hurni	(France) Jordan Roupnel	(Luxembourg) Chester Kieffer
6	R3	(France) Circuit Paul Ricard		(France) Paul Trojani	(France) Paul Trojani	(Switzerland) Christophe Hurni	no classified finishers	(Luxembourg) Chester Kieffer

=== Standings ===
The points awarded for the races at Navarra were multiplied by 1.5, while the points awarded for the races at Estoril were multiplied by 2.

Position	**1st**	**2nd**	**3rd**	**4th**	**5th**	**6th**	**7th**	**8th**	**9th**	**10th**	**11th**	**12th**	**13th**	**14th**	**15th**	**16th**	**17th**	**18th**	**19th**	**20th**
Points	28	24	20	17	16	15	14	13	12	11	10	9	8	7	6	5	4	3	2	1

==== F3R standings ====
Pos	Driver	LEC1 (France)			NAV (Spain)			HOC (Germany)			EST (Portugal)			MAG (France)			LEC2 (France)			Pts
Pos	Driver	R1	R2	R3	R1	R2	R3	R1	R2	R3	R1	R2	R3	R1	R2	R3	R1	R2	R3	Pts
1	(France) Paul Trojani	**1**	1	1	3	2	1	**1**	1	1	**2**	1	2	**1**	1	1	**1**	1	1	596
2	(Switzerland) Gaspard Le Gallais	2	2	2	**1**	1	2	2	2	2	6	2	1	Ret	2	2	2	2	11†	504
3	(Switzerland) Walter Rykart	7	5	8	5	4	5	5	4	4	7	5	5	3	4	4	10	9	10	346.5
4	(France) Frédéric Boillot	6	6	6				4	5	5	3	DSQ	6	6	5	6	8	10	8	247
5	(France) Laura Villars	9	8	9				DNS	7	7	5	6	7†	4	6	5				203
6	(France) Alban Nerguti	5	4	5	2	3	3										4	6	4	194
7	(Argentina) Francisco Soldavini										1	3	3							136
8	(France) Erwin Creed	4	9†	3				3	3	3										109
9	(France) Marius Mezard													2	3	3	DNS	5	3	100
10	(Australia) Craig McLatchey										4	Ret	DNS	7	7	Ret	9	11	9	96
11	(France) Alexandra Herve				4	Ret	4	6†*	6	6										88.5
12	(Switzerland) Christophe Hurni													5	Ret	7	7	8	7	71
13	(France) Jordan Roupnel										DNS	4	4							68
14	(France) Enzo Richer																3	3	2	64
15	(France) Eric Trouillet	3	3	4																57
16	(France) Adrien Hervouet																5	4	5	49
17	(Switzerland) Aubin Robert Prince																6	7	6	44
18	(Paraguay) Miguel Garcia	8	7	7																41
—	(Ukraine) Yaroslav Veselaho																WD	WD	WD	—
Ultimate Class
1	(Switzerland) Walter Rykart	4	2	4	**1**	1	1	3	2	2	**3**	1	1	**1**	1	1	4	2	4	546
2	(France) Frédéric Boillot	3	3	3				2	3	3	1	DSQ	2	3	2	2	2	3	2	364
3	(France) Erwin Creed	**2**	4†	1				**1**	1	1										153
4	(Australia) Craig McLatchey										2	Ret	DNS	4	3	Ret	3	4	3	142
5	(Switzerland) Christophe Hurni													2	Ret	3	**1**	1	1	128
6	(France) Eric Trouillet	1	1	2																80
Pos	Driver	R1	R2	R3	R1	R2	R3	R1	R2	R3	R1	R2	R3	R1	R2	R3	R1	R2	R3	Pts
Pos	Driver	LEC1 (France)			NAV (Spain)			HOC (Germany)			EST (Portugal)			MAG (France)			LEC2 (France)			Pts

Key
Colour	Result
Gold	Winner
Silver	Second place
Bronze	Third place
Green	Other points position
Blue	Other classified position
Blue	Not classified, finished (NC)
Purple	Not classified, retired (Ret)
Red	Did not qualify (DNQ)
Red	Did not pre-qualify (DNPQ)
Black	Disqualified (DSQ)
White	Did not start (DNS)
White	Race cancelled (C)
Blank	Did not practice (DNP)
Blank	Excluded (EX)
Blank	Did not arrive (DNA)
Blank	Withdrawn (WD)
Blank	Did not enter (cell empty)
Text formatting	Meaning
**Bold**	Pole position
Italics	Fastest lap

* - half points awarded as not enough laps were completed

==== FR2.0 standings ====
Pos	Driver	LEC1 (France)			NAV (Spain)			HOC (Germany)			EST (Portugal)			MAG (France)			LEC2 (France)			Pts
Pos	Driver	R1	R2	R3	R1	R2	R3	R1	R2	R3	R1	R2	R3	R1	R2	R3	R1	R2	R3	Pts
1	(France) Jordan Roupnel	**1**	1	1	**1**	1	1	**1**	1	1				**1**	1	1	**1**	1	Ret	434
2	(France) Gilles Depierre	2†	DNS	2				DNS	DNS	DNS				2	2	2	2	2	DNS	168
Pos	Driver	R1	R2	R3	R1	R2	R3	R1	R2	R3	R1	R2	R3	R1	R2	R3	R1	R2	R3	Pts
Pos	Driver	LEC1 (France)			NAV (Spain)			HOC (Germany)			EST (Portugal)			MAG (France)			LEC2 (France)			Pts

==== F4 standings ====
Pos	Driver	LEC1 (France)			NAV (Spain)			HOC (Germany)			EST (Portugal)			MAG (France)			LEC2 (France)			Pts
Pos	Driver	R1	R2	R3	R1	R2	R3	R1	R2	R3	R1	R2	R3	R1	R2	R3	R1	R2	R3	Pts
1	(France) Philippe Daric	**1**	1	1				1	DNS	1				**Ret**	DNS	DNS	2	Ret	2	188
2	(Luxembourg) Chester Kieffer																**1**	1	1	84
3	(Switzerland) Andreas Ritzi							**2**	1	DNS										52
Pos	Driver	R1	R2	R3	R1	R2	R3	R1	R2	R3	R1	R2	R3	R1	R2	R3	R1	R2	R3	Pts
Pos	Driver	LEC1 (France)			NAV (Spain)			HOC (Germany)			EST (Portugal)			MAG (France)			LEC2 (France)			Pts
