= 2021 Porsche Supercup =

29th Porsche Supercup season

Seasons
- ← 2020 2022 →

The 2021 Porsche Mobil 1 Supercup was the 29th Porsche Supercup season, a GT3 production stock car racing series sanctioned by Porsche Motorsports GmbH in the world. It began on 23 May at Circuit de Monaco and ended on 12 September at the Autodromo Nazionale di Monza, after eight races, all of which were support events for the 2021 Formula One season.

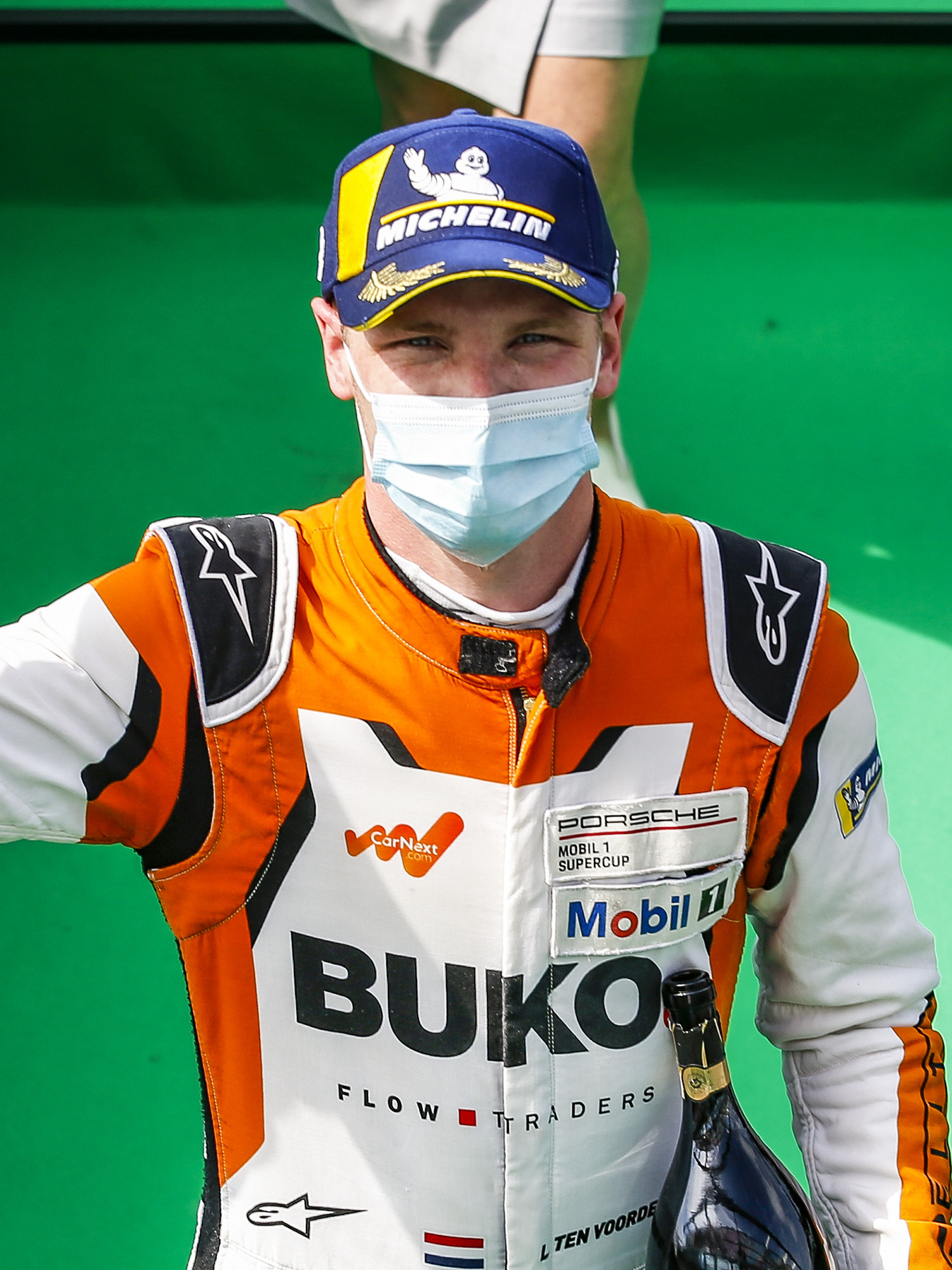
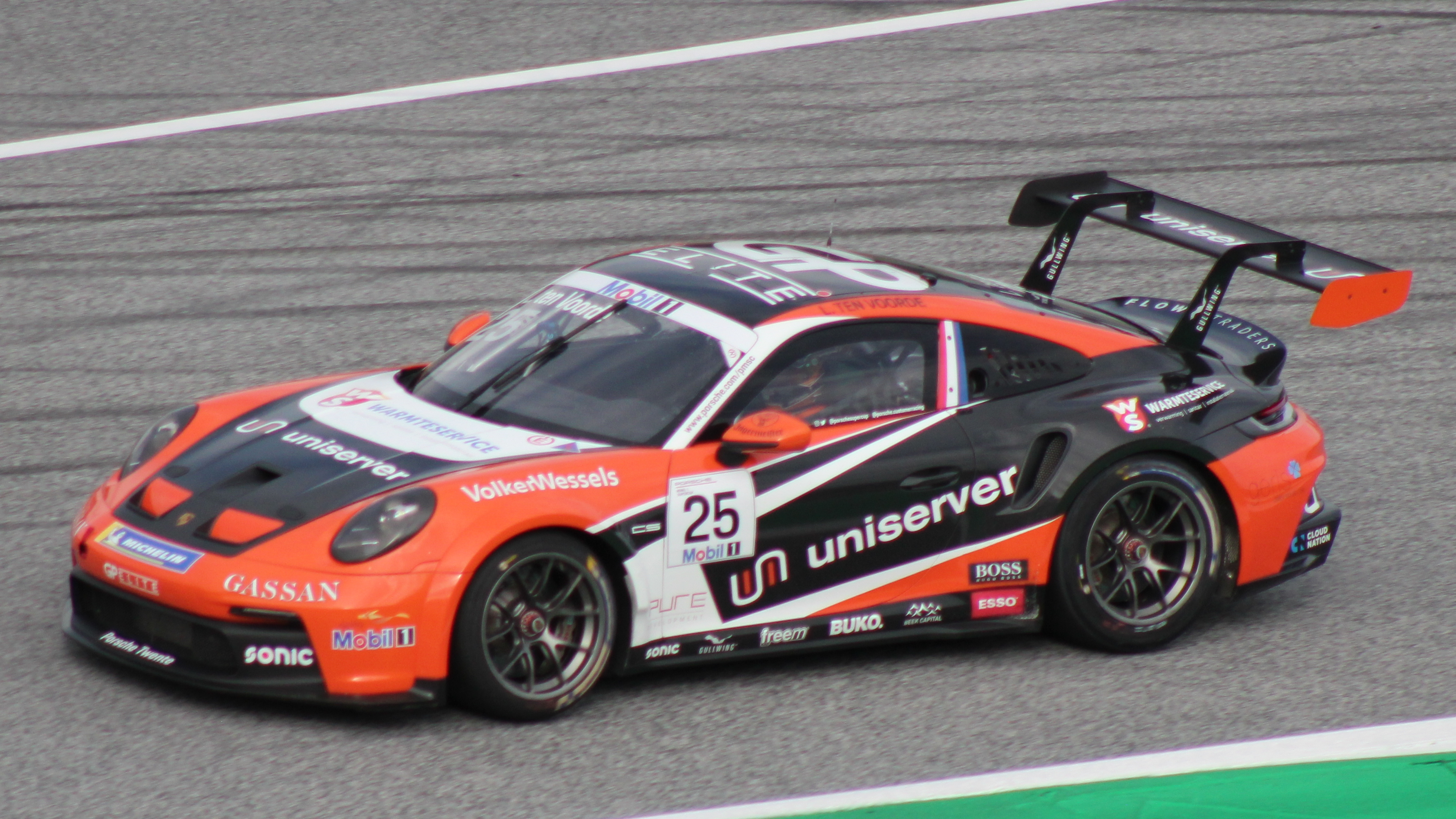
Larry ten Voorde (pictured in 2020) won his second consecutive Drivers' Championship title, with Team GP Elite winning the Team's Championship title.

== Rule changes ==
=== Technical ===
- The outgoing Porsche 911 GT3 Cup (Type 991 II) car fleet was replaced by the latest generation of Porsche 911 GT3 Cup (Type 992) and also all-new Porsche MA2.75 engines for all Porsche Supercup entrants from 2021 season onwards. The engine power output of all Porsche Supercup entrants was increased slightly from 485 to 510 bhp (362 to 380 kW; 492 to 517 PS).
- ExxonMobil would become the official major fuel retailer and convenience store partner and supplier of the series starting from 2021 season through Esso brand as a part of Porsche and ExxonMobil partnership since 1996 although in 1996 until 2020 the series was utilized the Panta NS 102 RON unleaded petrol fuel. All Porsche Supercup cars utilized Esso Synergy Renewable Racing Fuel with full-blend of Ethanol.

== Teams and drivers ==
Team	No.	Drivers	Class	Rounds
(Austria) BWT Lechner Racing	1	(France) Jean-Baptiste Simmenauer		All
(Austria) BWT Lechner Racing	2	(Turkey) Ayhancan Güven		All
(Austria) BWT Lechner Racing	3	(Luxembourg) Dylan Pereira		All
(Bahrain) Lechner Racing Middle East	4	(Cyprus) Tio Ellinas		All
(Bahrain) Lechner Racing Middle East	5	(Monaco) Nicolas Misslin	PA	All
(Switzerland) Fach Auto Racing	6	(Germany) Christopher Zöchling		All
(Switzerland) Fach Auto Racing	7	(Norway) Marius Nakken		All
(Switzerland) Fach Auto Racing	8	(France) Maxime Boulin		1
(Switzerland) Fach Auto Racing	8	(Switzerland) Fabio Scherer	G	2–8
(Netherlands) GP Elite	9	(Netherlands) Lucas Groeneveld		1–3, 5–8
(Netherlands) GP Elite	10	(Netherlands) Daan van Kuijk		All
(Netherlands) GP Elite	32	(Netherlands) Morris Schuring	G	4–6
(France) CLRT	11	(France) Florian Latorre		All
(France) CLRT	12	(France) Steven Palette		1–3, 5–6
(France) CLRT	12	(France) Marvin Klein	G	4, 7–8
(France) CLRT	35	(France) Marvin Klein	G	5
(Italy) Dinamic Motorsport	14	(Italy) Lodovico Laurini	R	1–4
(Italy) Dinamic Motorsport	14	(Netherlands) Jaap van Lagen	G	6
(Italy) Dinamic Motorsport	14	(Italy) Alessandro Giardelli	G	7–8
(Italy) Dinamic Motorsport	14	(Austria) Moritz Sager	G	5
(Italy) Dinamic Motorsport	34	(Austria) Moritz Sager	G	2–4
(Italy) Dinamic Motorsport	15	(Austria) Philipp Sager	PA	All
(Italy) Dinamic Motorsport	16	(Italy) Simone Iaquinta		1–3, 5–8
(Italy) Dinamic Motorsport	16	(Italy) Alessandro Giardelli	G	4
(Italy) Dinamic Motorsport	37	(Italy) Gianmarco Quaresmini	G	7–8
(United Kingdom) Team Parker Racing	17	(United Kingdom) Harry King	R	1, 3, 5–8
(United Kingdom) Team Parker Racing	17	(Netherlands) Loek Hartog	G	4
(United Kingdom) Team Parker Racing	36	(Netherlands) Loek Hartog	G	5–6
(United Kingdom) Team Parker Racing	18	(United Kingdom) Michael Crees	PA	1–3
(United Kingdom) Team Parker Racing	18	(United Kingdom) Garry Findlay	G	4–8
(France) Martinet by Alméras	19	(France) Dorian Boccolacci	R	All
(France) Martinet by Alméras	20	(New Zealand) Jaxon Evans		All
(France) Martinet by Alméras	33	(France) Roland Bervillé	G	2, 4, 8
(France) Martinet by Alméras	33	(France) Alessandro Ghiretti	G	5
(France) Pierre martinet by Alméras	21	(France) Clément Mateu	PA	All
(France) Pierre martinet by Alméras	22	(France) Stéphane Denoual	PA	All
(France) Pierre martinet by Alméras	23	(United Kingdom) Aaron Mason	PA	All
(Netherlands) Team GP Elite	24	(Netherlands) Max van Splunteren		All
(Netherlands) Team GP Elite	25	(Netherlands) Larry ten Voorde		All
(Netherlands) Team GP Elite	26	(Netherlands) Jesse van Kuijk		All
(Germany) Huber Racing	27	(Norway) Roar Lindland	PA	All
(Germany) Huber Racing	28	(Germany) Leon Köhler		All
(Germany) Huber Racing	29	(Germany) Laurin Heinrich	R	All
(Germany) MRS GT-Racing	30	(Brazil) Georgios Frangulis	G	3
(Germany) MRS GT-Racing	30	(Netherlands) Michael Verhagen	G	6–8
(Germany) MRS GT-Racing	31	(Finland) Jukka Honkavuori	G	3, 6–8
(Germany) Porsche Motorsport	911	(Republic of Ireland) Michael Fassbender	G	3

Icon	Class
PA	Pro-Am Cup
R	Rookie
G	Guest

== Race calendar and results ==
The 2021 Porsche Mobil 1 Supercup provisional calendar was released on 28 November 2020. On 14 May 2021, due to the changes in the Formula One calendar, the Porsche Supercup calendar was also adjusted, with the round at Paul Ricard on 25–27 June being replaced by a second round at the Red Bull Ring. Later on 28 June 2021 it was announced that the round at Silverstone would be cancelled and an additional race would be held at Monza.

Round	Circuit	Date	Pole position	Fastest lap	Winning driver	Winning team
1	Circuit de Monaco, Monte Carlo	20–23 May	(Netherlands) Larry ten Voorde	(Netherlands) Larry ten Voorde	(Netherlands) Larry ten Voorde	(Netherlands) Team GP Elite
2	(Austria) Red Bull Ring, Spielberg	25–27 June	(Netherlands) Larry ten Voorde	(Germany) Leon Köhler	(Netherlands) Larry ten Voorde	(Netherlands) Team GP Elite
3	(Austria) Red Bull Ring, Spielberg	2–4 July	(Luxembourg) Dylan Pereira	(New Zealand) Jaxon Evans	(New Zealand) Jaxon Evans	(France) Martinet by Alméras
4	(Hungary) Hungaroring, Budapest	30 July–1 August	(France) Marvin Klein	(Netherlands) Larry ten Voorde	(Netherlands) Larry ten Voorde	(Netherlands) Team GP Elite
5	(Belgium) Circuit de Spa-Francorchamps, Stavelot	27–29 August	(Netherlands) Larry ten Voorde	(Turkey) Ayhancan Güven	(Luxembourg) Dylan Pereira	(Austria) BWT Lechner Racing
6	(Netherlands) Circuit Zandvoort, Zandvoort	3–5 September	(Germany) Laurin Heinrich	(Germany) Laurin Heinrich	(Germany) Laurin Heinrich	(Germany) Nebulus Racing by Huber
7	(Italy) Autodromo Nazionale di Monza, Monza	10–12 September	(Turkey) Ayhancan Güven	(France) Florian Latorre	(Turkey) Ayhancan Güven	(Austria) BWT Lechner Racing
8	(Italy) Autodromo Nazionale di Monza, Monza	10–12 September	(Netherlands) Larry ten Voorde	(France) Marvin Klein	(Netherlands) Larry ten Voorde	(Netherlands) Team GP Elite

== Championship standings ==
=== Scoring system ===
Points were awarded to the top fifteen classified drivers in every race, using the following system:

Position	**1st**	**2nd**	**3rd**	**4th**	**5th**	**6th**	**7th**	**8th**	**9th**	**10th**	**11th**	**12th**	**13th**	**14th**	**15th**	**Ref**
Points	25	20	17	14	12	10	9	8	7	6	5	4	3	2	1	

In order for full points to be awarded, the race winner must complete at least 50% of the scheduled race distance. Half points are awarded if the race winner completes less than 50% of the race distance. In the event of a tie at the conclusion of the championship, a count-back system is used as a tie-breaker, with a driver's/constructor's best result used to decide the standings.

Guest drivers are ineligible to score points. If a guest driver finishes in first position, the second placed finisher will receive 25 points. The same goes for every other points scoring position. So if three guest drivers end up placed fourth, fifth and sixth, the seventh placed finisher will receive fourteen points and so forth - until the eighteenth placed finisher receives the final point.

=== Drivers' Championship ===
Pos.	Driver	MON (Monaco)	RBR1 (Austria)	RBR2 (Austria)	HUN (Hungary)	SPA (Belgium)	ZND (Netherlands)	MNZ1 (Italy)	MNZ2 (Italy)	Points
1	(Netherlands) Larry ten Voorde	**1**	**1**	3	1	**8**	5	3	**1**	155
2	(New Zealand) Jaxon Evans	2	6	1	2	12	10	4	7	111
3	(Turkey) Ayhancan Güven	20†	2	26	4	2	4	**1**	3	110
4	(Germany) Laurin Heinrich	14	8	4	5	3	**1**	5	2	110
5	(Germany) Leon Köhler	6	3	7	6	15	2	7	5	91
6	(France) Dorian Boccolacci	3	4	13	21	7	9	2	9	81
7	(Luxembourg) Dylan Pereira	11	25	**2**	11	1	6	21	13	71
8	(France) Florian Latorre	5	28†	5	3	28	12	20	4	61
9	(Netherlands) Max van Splunteren	17	5	Ret	9	5	7	10	8	56
10	(Germany) Christopher Zöchling	4	7	9	NC	4	Ret	14	11	50
11	(Cyprus) Tio Ellinas	8	12	6	7	9	17	11	Ret	48
12	(Italy) Simone Iaquinta	7	11	Ret		20	3	8	10	46
13	(France) Jean-Baptiste Simmenauer	Ret	9	8	12	14	20	17	18	30
14	(United Kingdom) Harry King	9		Ret		17	15	9	6	30
15	(Norway) Marius Nakken	12	13	Ret	14	21	19	13	14	21
16	(France) Steven Palette	10	22	14		11	23			17
17	(Netherlands) Jesse van Kuijk	16	10	12	13	25	27	Ret	21	17
18	(Netherlands) Daan van Kuijk	Ret	Ret	DNS	15	13	13	15	23	16
19	(Italy) Lodovico Laurini	13	15	Ret	19					5
20	(Netherlands) Lucas Groeneveld	15	24	15		19	22	23	19	6
21	(Monaco) Nicolas Misslin	Ret	17	17	18	24	25	18	22	5
22	(Norway) Roar Lindland	Ret	14	19	20	29	Ret	25	27	2
23	(France) Stéphane Denoual	Ret	20	18	24	Ret	Ret	Ret	28	1
24	(Austria) Philipp Sager	19	18	22	25	26	29	29	25	0
25	(France) Clément Mateu	18	21	21	27	Ret	28	27	30	0
26	(United Kingdom) Aaron Mason	Ret	23	20	22	26	26	24	24	0
27	(United Kingdom) Michael Crees	Ret	27	23						0
28	(France) Maxime Boulin	Ret								0
Guest drivers ineligible for points
-	(France) Marvin Klein				**DSQ**	6		6	12	-
-	(Netherlands) Jaap van Lagen						8			-
-	(Netherlands) Morris Schuring				8	18	18			-
-	(Netherlands) Loek Hartog				23	10	11			-
-	(Finland) Jukka Honkavuori			10			14	12	16	-
-	(Italy) Alessandro Giardelli				10			22	20	-
-	(Switzerland) Fabio Scherer		19	11	16	22	16	19	17	-
-	(Italy) Gianmarco Quaresmini							16	15	-
-	(Austria) Moritz Sager		16	16	17	16				-
-	(United Kingdom) Gary Findlay				26	23	21	Ret	26	-
-	(Republic of Ireland) Michael Fassbender			24						-
-	(Netherlands) Michael Verhagen						24	26	29	-
-	(Brazil) Georgios Frangulis			25						-
-	(France) Roland Bervillé		26		28			28	31	-
-	(France) Alessandro Ghiretti					30				-
Pos.	Driver	MON (Monaco)	RBR1 (Austria)	RBR2 (Austria)	HUN (Hungary)	SPA (Belgium)	ZND (Netherlands)	MNZ1 (Italy)	MNZ2 (Italy)	Points

Colour	Result
Gold	Winner
Silver	Second place
Bronze	Third place
Green	Points classification
Blue	Non-points classification
Blue	Non-classified finish (NC)
Purple	Retired, not classified (Ret)
Red	Did not qualify (DNQ)
Red	Did not pre-qualify (DNPQ)
Black	Disqualified (DSQ)
White	Did not start (DNS)
White	Withdrew (WD)
White	Race cancelled (C)
Blank	Did not practice (DNP)
Blank	Did not arrive (DNA)
Blank	Excluded (EX)

**Bold** – Pole
Italics – Fastest Lap

Notes

† – Driver did not finish the race, but were classified as they completed over 75% of the race distance.

=== Rookie Championship ===
Pos.	Driver	MON (Monaco)	RBR1 (Austria)	RBR2 (Austria)	HUN (Hungary)	SPA (Belgium)	ZND (Netherlands)	MNZ1 (Italy)	MNZ2 (Italy)	Points
1	(Germany) Laurin Heinrich	14	8	4	5	3	**1**	5	2	110
2	(France) Dorian Boccolacci	3	4	13	21	7	9	2	9	81
3	(United Kingdom) Harry King	9		Ret		17	15	9	6	30
4	(Italy) Lodovico Laurini	13	15	Ret	19					5
Pos.	Driver	MON (Monaco)	RBR1 (Austria)	RBR2 (Austria)	HUN (Hungary)	SPA (Belgium)	ZND (Netherlands)	MNZ1 (Italy)	MNZ2 (Italy)	Points

=== Pro-Am Championship ===
Pos.	Driver	MON (Monaco)	RBR1 (Austria)	RBR2 (Austria)	HUN (Hungary)	SPA (Belgium)	ZND (Netherlands)	MNZ1 (Italy)	MNZ2 (Italy)	Points
1	(Monaco) Nicolas Misslin	Ret	17	17	18	24	25	18	22	170
2	(Austria) Philipp Sager	19	18	22	25	26	29	29	25	122
3	(United Kingdom) Aaron Mason	Ret	23	20	22	27	26	24	24	118
4	(Norway) Roar Lindland	Ret	14	19	20	29	Ret	25	27	107
5	(France) Clément Mateu	18	21	21	27	Ret	27	27	30	100
6	(France) Stéphane Denoual	Ret	20	18	24	Ret	Ret	Ret	29	60
7	(United Kingdom) Michael Crees	Ret	27	23						18
Pos.	Driver	MON (Monaco)	RBR1 (Austria)	RBR2 (Austria)	HUN (Hungary)	SPA (Belgium)	ZND (Netherlands)	MNZ1 (Italy)	MNZ2 (Italy)	Points

=== Teams' Championship ===
Pos.	Team	Points
1	(Netherlands) Team GP Elite	210
2	(Germany) Nebulus Racing by Huber	201
3	(France) Martinet by Alméras	190
4	(Austria) BWT Lechner Racing	179
5	(France) CLRT	91
6	(Italy) Dinamic Motorsport SRL	67
7	(Switzerland) Fach Auto Racing	62
8	(Bahrain) Lechner Racing Middle East	50
9	(United Kingdom) Parker Revs Motorsport	29
10	(Netherlands) GP Elite	20
11	(France) Pierre martinet by Alméras	1
