= 2020 Porsche Supercup =

28th Porsche Supercup season

Seasons
- ← 2019 2021 →

The 2020 Porsche Mobil 1 Supercup was the 28th Porsche Supercup season, a GT3 production stock car racing series sanctioned by Porsche Motorsports GmbH in the world. It began on 5 July at the Red Bull Ring and ended on 6 September at the Autodromo Nazionale di Monza, after eight scheduled races, all of which were support events for the 2020 Formula One season.

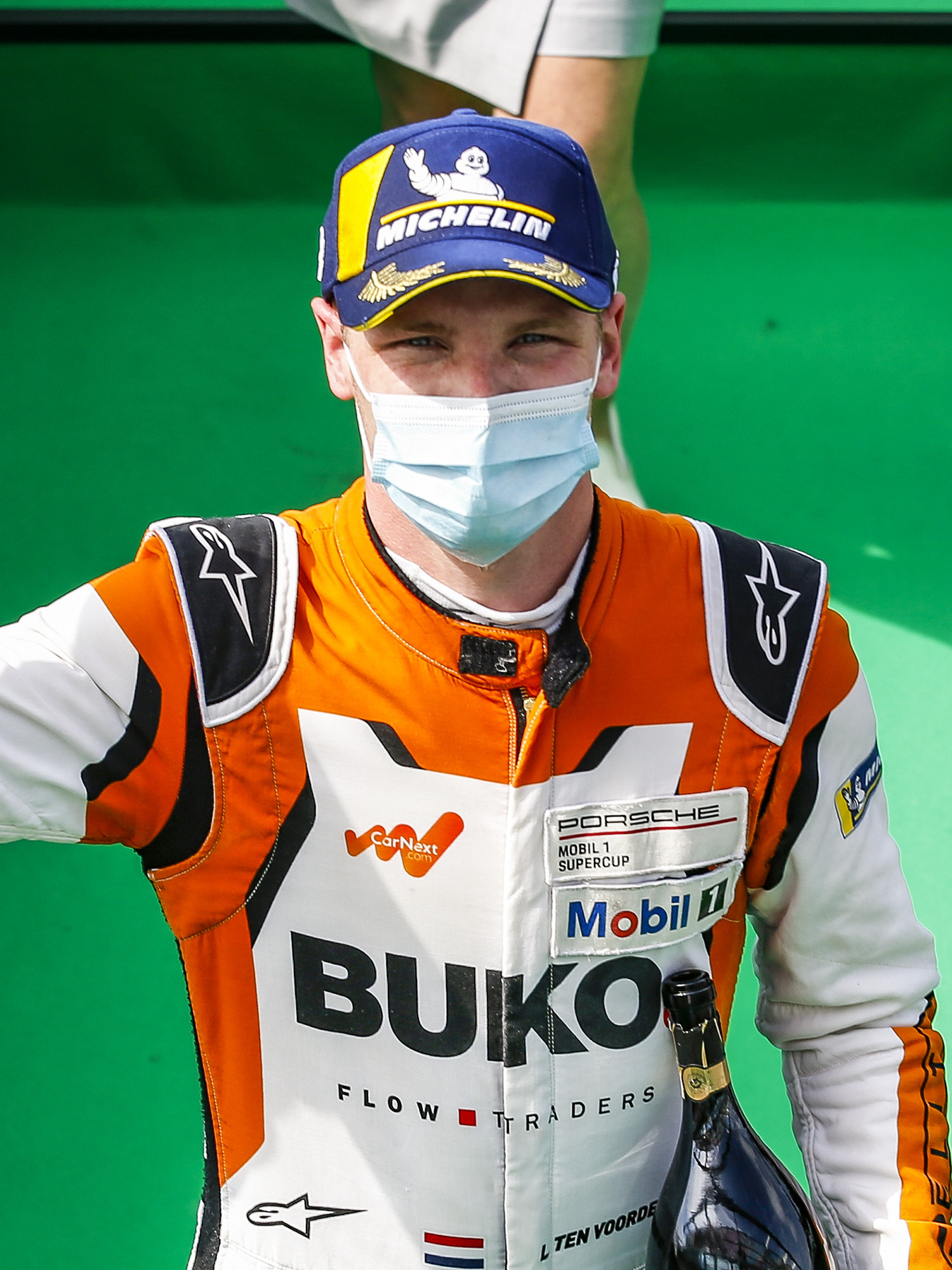
Larry ten Voorde won the Drivers' Championship title.

== Teams and drivers ==
Team	No.	Drivers	Class	Rounds
(Austria) BWT Lechner Racing	1	(New Zealand) Jaxon Evans		All
(Austria) BWT Lechner Racing	2	(Luxembourg) Dylan Pereira		All
(Bahrain) Lechner Racing Middle East	3	(Germany) Leon Köhler	R	All
(Bahrain) Lechner Racing Middle East	4	(France) Jean-Baptiste Simmenauer	R	All
(Bahrain) Lechner Racing Middle East	8	(Germany) Julian Hanses	G	1–2, 4–5
(Bahrain) Lechner Racing Middle East	8	(Monaco) Nicolas Misslin	G	6–7
(Bahrain) Lechner Racing Middle East	34	(Turkey) Berkay Besler	G	4–5
(Switzerland) Fach Auto Tech	5	(Netherlands) Jaap van Lagen		All
(Switzerland) Fach Auto Tech	6	(Australia) Jordan Love	R	All
(Switzerland) Fach Auto Tech	41	(Italy) Diego Bertonelli	G	8
(Italy) Dinamic Motorsport	10	(Norway) Marius Nakken		All
(Italy) Dinamic Motorsport	11	(Austria) Moritz Sager	R	1–5
(Italy) Dinamic Motorsport	11	(United States) Jaden Conwright	G	6–8
(Italy) Dinamic Motorsport	12	(Austria) Philipp Sager	PA	All
(Italy) Dinamic Motorsport	40	(Italy) Gianmarco Quaresmini	G	8
(Germany) MRS GT-Racing	14	(Guatemala) Mateo Llarena	R	All
(Germany) MRS GT-Racing	15	(Finland) Jukka Honkavuori		All
(Germany) MRS GT-Racing	16	(Germany) Laurin Heinrich	G	1–2
(Germany) MRS GT-Racing	16	(United Kingdom) JM Littman	G	4–5
(Germany) MRS GT-Racing	16	(Sweden) Hugo Nerman	G	7–8
(France) Pierre Martinet by Alméras	19	(France) Stéphane Denoual	PA	1, 3, 7
(France) Pierre Martinet by Alméras	19	(France) Roland Bervillé	PA	2, 6, 8
(France) Pierre Martinet by Alméras	20	(Norway) Roar Lindland	PA	All
(France) Pierre Martinet by Alméras	21	(France) Clément Mateu	PA	All
(France) Martinet by Alméras	22	(Turkey) Ayhancan Güven		All
(France) Martinet by Alméras	23	(France) Marvin Klein	R	All
(Netherlands) Team GP Elite	24	(Netherlands) Max van Splunteren	R	All
(Netherlands) Team GP Elite	25	(Netherlands) Larry ten Voorde		All
(Netherlands) Team GP Elite	26	(Netherlands) Jesse van Kuijk		All
(Netherlands) GP Elite	30	(Belgium) Lucas Groeneveld	R	All
(Netherlands) GP Elite	31	(Netherlands) Daan van Kuijk	R	All
(France) CLRT	32	(France) Philippe Haezebrouck	PA	1–4
(France) CLRT	32	(France) Côme Ledogar	G	5
(France) CLRT	32	(France) Adam Eteki	G	6–8
(France) CLRT	33	(France) Florian Latorre		All
(Netherlands) Bas Koeten Racing Team	35	(Netherlands) Loek Hartog	G	7
(Netherlands) Bas Koeten Racing Team	36	(Netherlands) Maxime Oosten	G	7
(Italy) Ombra Racing	38	(Italy) Simone Iaquinta	G	8
(Italy) Ombra Racing	39	(Italy) Stefano Gattuso	G	8
(Germany) Porsche Motorsport	911	(Republic of Ireland) Michael Fassbender	G	6

Icon	Class
PA	Pro-Am Cup
R	Rookie
G	Guest

== Race calendar and results ==
The revised calendar was announced on 3 June 2020.

Round	Circuit	Date	Pole position	Fastest lap	Winning driver	Winning team
1	(Austria) Red Bull Ring, Spielberg	5 July	(New Zealand) Jaxon Evans	(France) Florian Latorre	(New Zealand) Jaxon Evans	(Austria) BWT Lechner Racing
2	(Austria) Red Bull Ring, Spielberg	12 July	(Turkey) Ayhancan Güven	(Luxembourg) Dylan Pereira	(Luxembourg) Dylan Pereira	(Austria) BWT Lechner Racing
3	(Hungary) Hungaroring, Budapest	19 July	(Luxembourg) Dylan Pereira	(Luxembourg) Dylan Pereira	(Luxembourg) Dylan Pereira	(Austria) BWT Lechner Racing
4	(United Kingdom) Silverstone Circuit, Silverstone	2 August	(Netherlands) Larry ten Voorde	(Netherlands) Larry ten Voorde	(Netherlands) Larry ten Voorde	(Netherlands) Team GP Elite
5	(United Kingdom) Silverstone Circuit, Silverstone	9 August	(Turkey) Ayhancan Güven	(Luxembourg) Dylan Pereira	(Turkey) Ayhancan Güven	(France) martinet by Alméras
6	(Spain) Circuit de Catalunya, Barcelona	16 August	(Netherlands) Larry ten Voorde	(New Zealand) Jaxon Evans	(Netherlands) Larry ten Voorde	(Netherlands) Team GP Elite
7	(Belgium) Circuit de Spa-Francorchamps, Stavelot	30 August	(Turkey) Ayhancan Güven	(Luxembourg) Dylan Pereira	(Turkey) Ayhancan Güven	(France) martinet by Alméras
8	(Italy) Autodromo Nazionale Monza, Monza	6 September	(Netherlands) Larry ten Voorde	(Netherlands) Larry ten Voorde	(Netherlands) Larry ten Voorde	(Netherlands) Team GP Elite

== Championship standings ==
=== Drivers' Championship ===
Pos.	Driver	RBR (Austria)		HUN (Hungary)	SIL (United Kingdom)		CAT (Spain)	SPA (Belgium)	MNZ (Italy)	Points
1	(Netherlands) Larry ten Voorde	4	3	3	1	2	1	5	1	155
2	(Luxembourg) Dylan Pereira	2	1	1	6	3	3	2	4	148
3	(Turkey) Ayhancan Güven	8	2	2	9	1	8	1	Ret	113
4	(New Zealand) Jaxon Evans	1	5	20	3	8	2	4	5	108
5	(France) Florian Latorre	5	7	6	4	7	4	3	2	105
6	(Netherlands) Max van Splunteren	15	9	9	2	4	5	8	13	77
7	(France) Marvin Klein	7	6	4	7	6	9	7	10	75
8	(Germany) Leon Köhler	3	4	Ret	8	9	6	26	3	73
9	(France) Jean-Baptiste Simmenauer	6	8	5	10	5	Ret	9	6	65
10	(Australia) Jordan Love	12	13	8	12	Ret	11	12	7	44
11	(Netherlands) Jaap van Lagen	Ret	11	Ret	5	13	7	6	19	43
12	(Norway) Marius Nakken	9	18	7	13	12	10	15	8	43
13	(Finland) Jukka Honkavuori	Ret	15	13	17	14	12	13	14	25
14	(Netherlands) Jesse van Kuijk	14	14	12	15	16	17	24	15	23
15	(Belgium) Lucas Groeneveld	17	16	11	16	17	13	14	20	19
16	(Netherlands) Daan van Kuijk	13	17	10	23	19	Ret	16	17	17
17	(Austria) Moritz Sager	16	19	14	20	Ret				4
18	(Guatemala) Mateo Llarena	19	24	15	19	18	14	19	24	4
19	(Norway) Roar Lindland	20	20	16	18	21	16	22	18	3
20	(France) Stéphane Denoual	21		17				20		0
21	(Austria) Philipp Sager	18	21	Ret	22	20	21	21	Ret	0
22	(France) Clément Mateu	22	22	18	21	22	20	25	22	0
23	(France) Philippe Haezebrouck	23	25	19	25					0
24	(France) Roland Bervillé		23				Ret		23	0
Guest drivers ineligible for points
-	(Germany) Julian Hanses	11	12		14	9				0
-	(Italy) Diego Bertonelli								9	0
-	(Germany) Laurin Heinrich	10	10							0
-	(Netherlands) Loek Hartog							10		0
-	(Turkey) Berkay Besler				11	11				0
-	(United States) Jaden Conwright						18	11	Ret	0
-	(Italy) Gianmarco Quaresmini								11	0
-	(Italy) Simone Iaquinta								12	0
-	(France) Côme Ledogar					15				0
-	(Monaco) Nicolas Misslin						15	17		0
-	(France) Adam Eteki						19	23	16	0
-	(Netherlands) Maxime Oosten							18		0
-	(United Kingdom) JM Littman				24	23				0
-	(Republic of Ireland) Michael Fassbender						Ret			0
-	(Sweden) Hugo Nerman							Ret	Ret	0
Pos.	Driver	RBR (Austria)		HUN (Hungary)	SIL (United Kingdom)		CAT (Spain)	SPA (Belgium)	MNZ (Italy)	Points

=== Rookie Championship ===
Pos.	Driver	RBR (Austria)		HUN (Hungary)	SIL (United Kingdom)		CAT (Spain)	SPA (Belgium)	MNZ (Italy)	Points
1	(Netherlands) Max van Splunteren	15	9	9	2	4	5	8	13	77
2	(France) Marvin Klein	7	6	4	7	6	9	7	10	75
3	(Germany) Leon Köhler	3	4	Ret	8	9	6	26	3	73
4	(France) Jean-Baptiste Simmenauer	6	8	5	10	5	Ret	9	6	65
5	(Australia) Jordan Love	12	13	8	12	Ret	11	12	7	44
6	(Belgium) Lucas Groeneveld	17	16	11	16	17	13	14	20	19
7	(Netherlands) Daan van Kuijk	13	17	10	23	19	Ret	16	17	17
8	(Austria) Moritz Sager	16	19	14	20	Ret				4
9	(Guatemala) Mateo Llarena	19	24	15	19	18	14	19	24	4
Pos.	Driver	RBR (Austria)		HUN (Hungary)	SIL (United Kingdom)		CAT (Spain)	SPA (Belgium)	MNZ (Italy)	Points

=== Pro-Am Championship ===
Pos.	Driver	RBR (Austria)		HUN (Hungary)	SIL (United Kingdom)		CAT (Spain)	SPA (Belgium)	MNZ (Italy)	Points
1	(Norway) Roar Lindland	20	20	16	18	21	16	22	18	182
2	(France) Clément Mateu	22	22	18	21	22	20	25	22	125
3	(Austria) Philipp Sager	18	21	Ret	22	20	21	21	Ret	124
4	(France) Stéphane Denoual	21		17				20		62
5	(France) Philippe Haezebrouck	23	25	19	25					52
6	(France) Roland Bervillé		23				Ret		23	31
Pos.	Driver	RBR (Austria)		HUN (Hungary)	SIL (United Kingdom)		CAT (Spain)	SPA (Belgium)	MNZ (Italy)	Points

=== Teams' Championship ===
Pos.	Team	RBR (Austria)		HUN (Hungary)	SIL (United Kingdom)		CAT (Spain)	SPA (Belgium)	MNZ (Italy)	Points
1	(Austria) BWT Lechner Racing	1	1	1	3	3	2	2	4	256
1	(Austria) BWT Lechner Racing	2	5	20	6	8	3	4	5	256
2	(Netherlands) Team GP Elite	4	3	3	1	2	1	5	1	232
2	(Netherlands) Team GP Elite	15	9	9	2	4	5	8	13	232
3	(France) martinet by Alméras	7	2	2	7	1	8	1	10	188
3	(France) martinet by Alméras	8	6	4	9	6	9	7	Ret	188
4	(Bahrain) Lechner Racing Middle East	3	4	5	8	5	6	9	3	138
4	(Bahrain) Lechner Racing Middle East	6	8	Ret	10	9	Ret	25	6	138
5	(France) CLRT	5	7	6	4	7	4	3	2	57
5	(France) CLRT	23	25	19	25	15	19	23	16	57
6	(Switzerland) Fach Auto Tech	12	11	8	5	13	7	6	7	86
6	(Switzerland) Fach Auto Tech	Ret	13	Ret	12	Ret	11	12	19	86
7	(Italy) Dinamic Motorsport	9	18	7	13	12	10	15	8	51
7	(Italy) Dinamic Motorsport	16	19	14	20	20	18	11	Ret	51
8	(Netherlands) GP Elite	13	16	10	16	17	13	14	17	32
8	(Netherlands) GP Elite	17	17	11	23	19	Ret	16	20	32
9	(Germany) MRS GT-Racing	19	15	13	17	14	12	13	14	27
9	(Germany) MRS GT-Racing	Ret	24	15	19	18	14	19	24	27
10	(France) Pierre martinet by Alméras	20	20	16	18	21	16	22	18	2
10	(France) Pierre martinet by Alméras	21	22	17	21	22	20	25	22	2
Pos.	Team	RBR (Austria)		HUN (Hungary)	SIL (United Kingdom)		CAT (Spain)	SPA (Belgium)	MNZ (Italy)	Points
