= Leon Köhler =

German racing driver

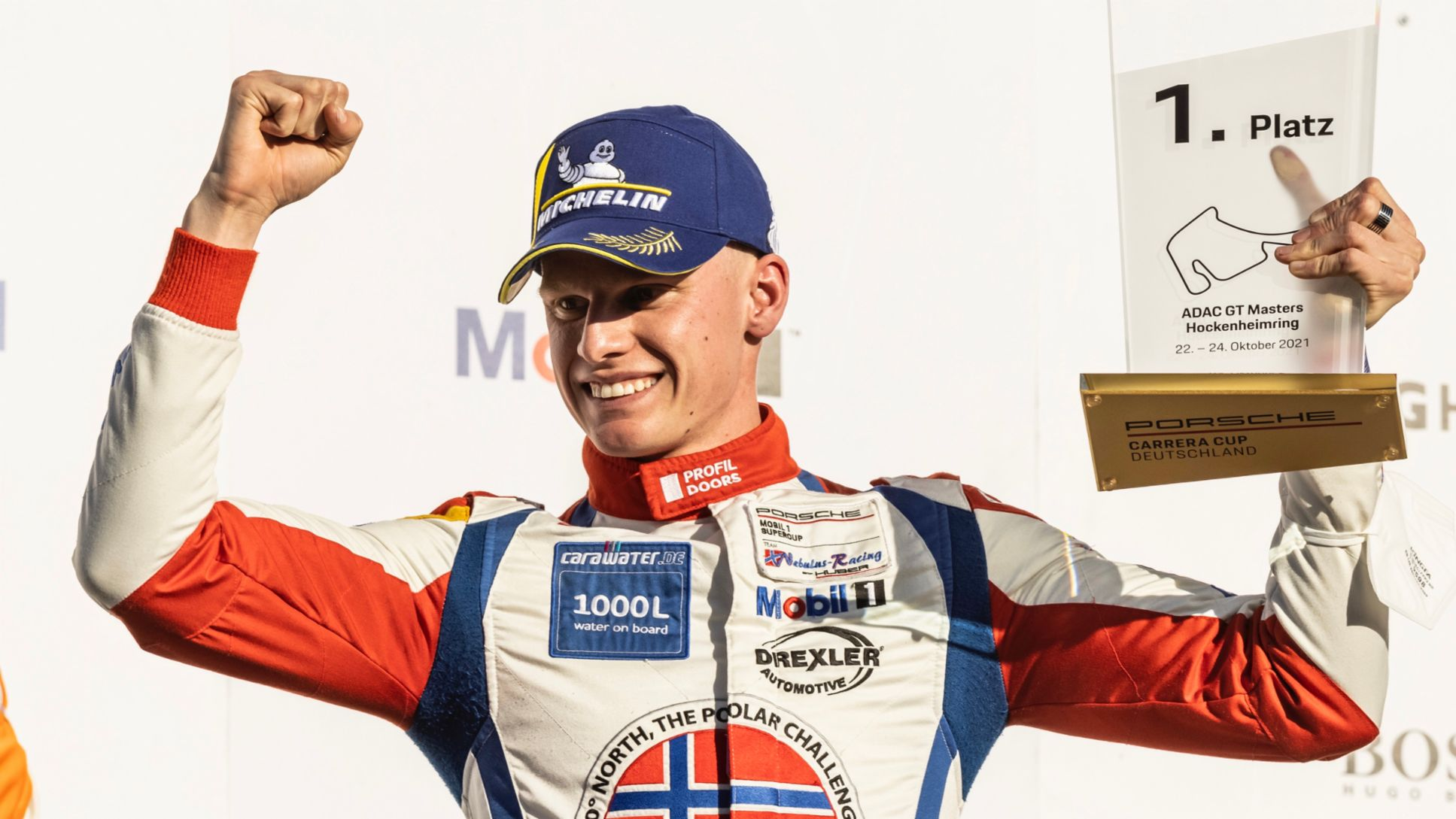
- Köhler in 2021
- Nationality: (Germany) German
- Born: 7 August 1999 (age 27) Erlenbach am Main, Germany

ADAC GT Masters career
- Debut season: 2022
- Current team: ID Racing
- Categorisation: FIA Silver
- Car number: 44
- Starts: 2
- Wins: 0
- Podiums: 0
- Poles: 0
- Fastest laps: 0

Previous series
- 2021 2019–2021 2019–2021 2018–2020 2018 2018: Porsche Carrera Cup NA; Porsche Carrera Cup Germany; Porsche Supercup; Porsche Sprint Challenge ME; ADAC Formula 4 Championship; Formula 4 UAE Championship

Leon Köhler (born 7 August 1999) is a German former racing driver. A graduate of ADAC Formula 4 and Porsche Supercup, Köhler competed in DTM for BMW in 2022, and was ADAC GT Masters runner-up in 2024.

== Career ==
=== Karting ===
Köhler started karting in 2007. In 2017, he became champion in the KZ2-class of the ADAC Kart Masters and the CIK-FIA Karting European Championship.

=== Formula 4 ===
In 2018, Köhler made his single-seater debut in the Formula 4 UAE Championship where he won on debut. He won two of the three races he contested. Afterwards he joined Mücke Motorsport in the ADAC Formula 4 Championship. After scoring a single podium in the final race of the season at the Hockenheimring, he was classified 13th in the final standings.

=== GT racing ===
In 2019, Köhler made a switch to Porsche GT3 Cup racing. In 2019, he started in the Porsche Carrera Cup Germany while also making his first appearances in the Porsche Supercup as a guest driver. He then went on the win the 2019–20 Porsche Sprint Challenge Middle East with five wins.

In 2020, Köhler scored his first win in the Porsche Carrera Cup Germany at the Lausitzring and finished the championship in third. He also contested his first full season in the Porsche Supercup with Lechner Racing Middle East.

Köhler during the Red Bull Ring round of the 2021 Porsche Supercup.

In 2021, Köhler once again finished third in the Porsche Carrera Cup Germany after scoring wins at the Red Bull Ring and the Hockenheimring for Nebulus Racing by Huber. In the Porsche Supercup, he classified fifth with podiums at the Red Bull Ring and Zandvoort.

In early 2022, Köhler made one ADAC GT Masters start for ID Racing at the Red Bull Ring, sharing a Porsche 911 GT3 R with Jaxon Evans. A week later, he contested the 24 Hours of Nürburgring for Phoenix-IronForce Racing, placing fifth in Cup2 alongside Timo Scheider, Luca Engstler and Jan-Erik Slooten. Köhler also joined Lionspeed by Car Collection Motorsport to drive an Audi R8 LMS Evo II in the Nürburgring Langstrecken-Serie and won the SP9 Pro-Am class twice.

In late 2022, Köhler made his Deutsche Tourenwagen Masters debut, replacing Esteban Muth in Walkenhorst Motorsport's BMW M4 GT3 for the final two rounds. After qualifying fastest of all BMW drivers at the Red Bull Ring, Köhler scored a points finish with eighth at Hockenheim.

Köhler was ADAC GT Masters runner-up for FK Performance and BMW in 2024.

Despite sampling a Mercedes-AMG GT3 Evo in a DTM young driver test, Köhler spent 2023 back in Porsche Supercup and PCCD. He returned to BMW for 2024, joining FK Performance Motorsport to partner Maxime Oosten in the ADAC GT Masters. The pair took victories at Oschersleben, Zandvoort and Spa-Francorchamps on their way to runner-up honours.

On 7 March 2025, Köhler announced his retirement from racing, citing budget issues and stating "I had to listen to my heart".

== Racing record ==
=== Career summary ===
Season	Series	Team	Races	Wins	Poles	F/Laps	Podiums	Points	Position
2017–18	Formula 4 UAE Championship	Rasgaira Motorsports	3	2	0	0	2	58	12th
2018	ADAC Formula 4 Championship	ADAC Berlin-Brandenburg	20	0	0	0	1	33	13th
2018-19	Porsche Sprint Challenge Middle East		16	0	1	0	3	196	6th
2019	Porsche Carrera Cup Germany	MSG/HRT Motorsport	14	0	0	0	1	60	13th
2019	Porsche Supercup	Huber Racing	2	0	0	0	0	0	NC†
2019	Porsche Supercup	Lechner Racing Middle East	1	0	0	0	0	0	NC†
2019–20	Porsche Sprint Challenge Middle East		12	5	4	5	11	280	**1st**
2020	Porsche Carrera Cup Germany	T3/HRT Motorsport	11	1	1	2	6	127	**3rd**
2020	Porsche Supercup	Lechner Racing Middle East	8	0	0	0	2	73	8th
2020	24H GT Series - 991	HRT Motorsport	1	0	0	0	0	21	7th
2021	Porsche Carrera Cup Germany	Nebulus Racing by Huber	16	2	0	3	5	222	**3rd**
2021	Porsche Carrera Cup North America	MRS GT-Racing	3	0	0	0	0	23	17th
2021	Porsche Supercup	Huber Racing	8	0	0	1	2	91	5th
2021	24H GT Series - 991	HRT Performance	1	0	0	0	0	0	NC†
2022	ADAC GT Masters	ID-Racing	2	0	0	0	0	3	34th
2022	Deutsche Tourenwagen Masters	Walkenhorst Motorsport	4	0	0	0	0	4	24th
2022	Nürburgring Langstrecken-Serie - SP9 Pro-Am	Lionspeed by Car Collection Motorsport	3	2	1	0	3	0	NC†
2022	Nürburgring Langstrecken-Serie - Cup2	Frikadelli Racing Team	1	0	0	0	0	10	49th
2022	24 Hours of Nürburgring - Cup2	IronForce Racing by Phoenix	1	0	0	0	0	N/A	5th
2022–23	Middle East Trophy - GT3	OnlyFans Racing With P1 Groupe By MRS	1	0	0	0	0	0	NC†
2023	Porsche Supercup	Huber Racing	5	0	0	0	1	37	14th
2023	Porsche Carrera Cup Germany	Huber Racing	8	0	0	0	2	113	6th
2023	Porsche Carrera Cup Germany	Proton Competition	8	0	0	0	0	113	6th
2024	ADAC GT Masters	FK Performance Motorsport	12	3	1	3	6	205	**2nd**

=== Complete Formula 4 UAE Championship results ===
(key) (Races in bold indicate pole position) (Races in italics indicate fastest lap)

Year	Team	1	2	3	4	5	6	7	8	9	10	11	12	13	14	15	16	17	18	19	20	21	22	23	24	Pos	Points
2017-18	Rasgaira Motorsports	YMC1; 1	YMC1; 2	YMC1; 3	YMC1; 4	YMC1; 1	YMC1; 2	YMC1; 3	YMC1; 4	DUB1; 1; 1	DUB1; 2; 6	DUB1; 3; 1	DUB1; 4 C	YMC3; 1	YMC3; 2	YMC3; 3	YMC3; 4	YMC4; 1	YMC4; 2	YMC4; 3	YMC4; 4	DUB2; 1	DUB2; 2	DUB2; 3	DUB2; 4	12th	58

=== Complete ADAC Formula 4 Championship results ===
(key) (Races in bold indicate pole position) (Races in italics indicate fastest lap)

Year	Team	1	2	3	4	5	6	7	8	9	10	11	12	13	14	15	16	17	18	19	20	Pos	Points
2018	ADAC Berlin-Brandenburg	OSC; 1; 12	OSC; 2; 10	OSC; 3; 16	HOC1; 1 Ret	HOC1; 2; 12	HOC1; 3; 16	LAU; 1 Ret	LAU; 2; 10	LAU; 3; 10	RBR; 1; 14	RBR; 2; 9	RBR; 3; 11	HOC2; 1; 17	HOC2; 2 Ret	NÜR; 1; 10	NÜR; 2; 8	NÜR; 3 Ret	HOC3; 1 Ret	HOC3; 2; 6	HOC3; 3; 3	13th	33

=== Complete Deutsche Tourenwagen Masters results ===
(key) (Races in bold indicate pole position) (Races in italics indicate fastest lap)

Year	Team	Car	1	2	3	4	5	6	7	8	9	10	11	12	13	14	15	16	Pos	Points
2022	Walkenhorst Motorsport	BMW M4 GT3	ALG; 1	ALG; 2	LAU; 1	LAU; 2	IMO; 1	IMO; 2	NOR; 1	NOR; 2	NÜR; 1	NÜR; 2	SPA; 1	SPA; 2	RBR; 1 Ret	RBR; 2; 13	HOC; 1; 16	HOC; 2; 8	24th	4
