= 2019 Porsche Supercup =

27th Porsche Supercup season

Seasons
- ← 2018 2020 →

The 2019 Porsche Mobil 1 Supercup was the 27th Porsche Supercup season, a GT3 production stock car racing series sanctioned by Porsche Motorsports GmbH in the world. It began on 12 May at Circuit de Catalunya and ended on 27 October at Autódromo Hermanos Rodríguez, after ten scheduled races, all of which were support events for the 2019 Formula One season.

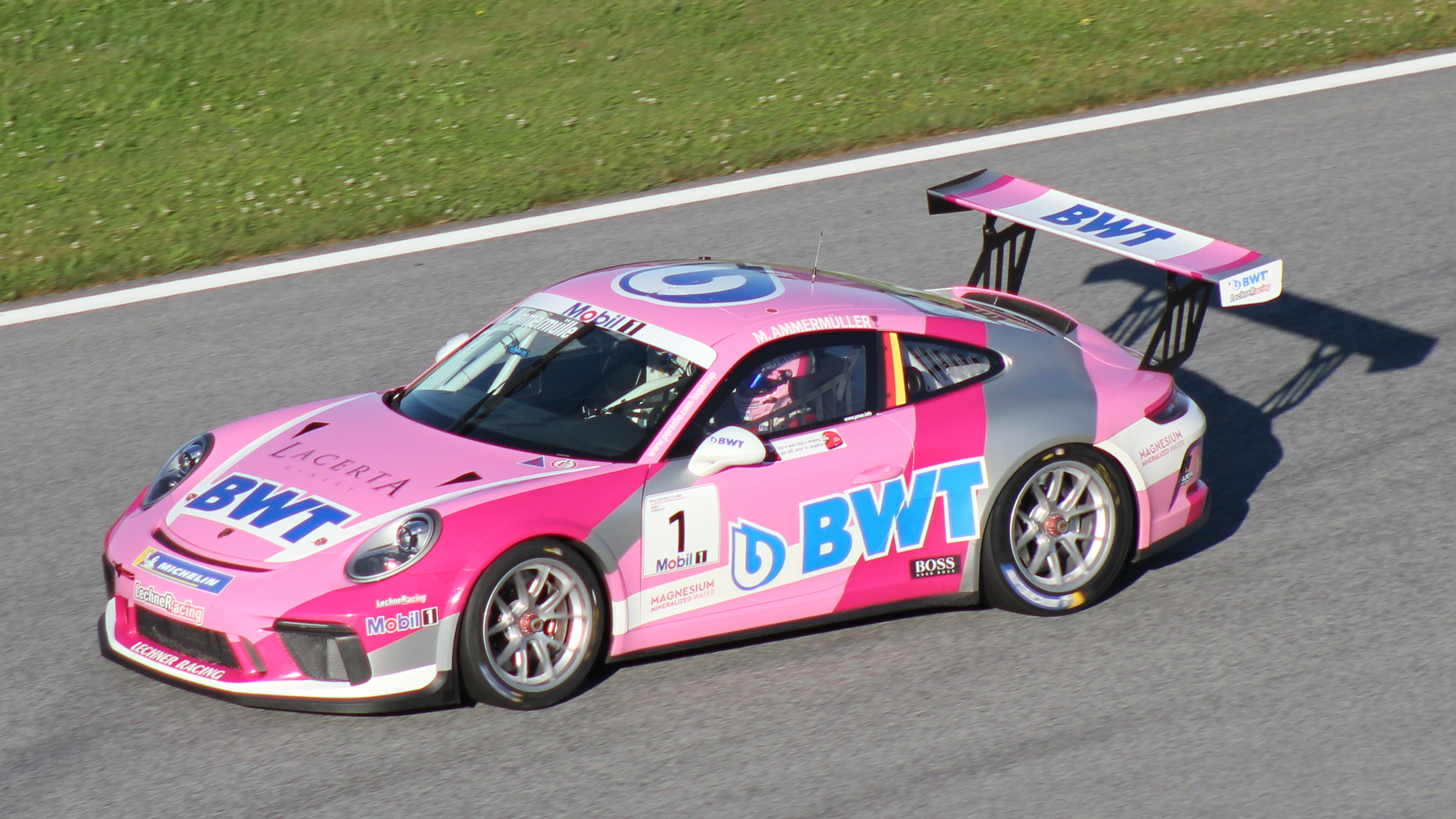
Michael Ammermüller won his third consecutive Drivers' Championship title, driving for Lechner Racing.

== Teams and drivers ==
Team	No.	Drivers	Class	Rounds
(Austria) BWT Lechner Racing	1	(Germany) Michael Ammermüller		All
(Austria) BWT Lechner Racing	2	(France) Julien Andlauer		All
(United States) Momo Megatron Lechner Racing Team	3	(Luxembourg) Dylan Pereira		All
(United States) Momo Megatron Lechner Racing Team	4	(Cyprus) Tio Ellinas		All
(Switzerland) Fach Auto Tech	5	(France) Florian Latorre		All
(Switzerland) Fach Auto Tech	6	(Thailand) Kantadhee Kusiri	R	All
(Switzerland) Fach Auto Tech	7	(New Zealand) Jaxon Evans		All
(Bahrain) Lechner Racing Middle East	8	(Oman) Al Faisal Al Zubair		All
(Bahrain) Lechner Racing Middle East	9	(South Africa) Saul Hack		All
(Bahrain) Lechner Racing Middle East	30	(France) Jean-Baptiste Simmenauer	G	3–4, 6–7
(Bahrain) Lechner Racing Middle East	30	(Germany) Leon Köhler	G	5
(Italy) Dinamic Motorsport	10	(Denmark) Mikkel O. Pedersen		All
(Italy) Dinamic Motorsport	11	(Italy) Gianmarco Quaresmini		All
(Italy) Dinamic Motorsport	12	(Austria) Philipp Sager	PA	All
(Italy) Dinamic Motorsport	44	(Italy) Alberto Cerqui	G	8
(Germany) MRS GT-Racing	14	(France) Nicolas Misslin	PA	1–2
(Germany) MRS GT-Racing	14	(South Africa) Ewan Taylor	R	3–6
(Germany) MRS GT-Racing	14	(Netherlands) Loek Hartog	R	7
(Germany) MRS GT-Racing	14	(Finland) Jukka Honkavuori		8
(Germany) MRS GT-Racing	14	(Argentina) Ariel Pacho	G	9
(Germany) MRS GT-Racing	15	(France) Enzo Guibbert	R	1
(Germany) MRS GT-Racing	15	(Netherlands) Larry ten Voorde		2–9
(Germany) MRS GT-Racing	16	(Japan) Kenji Kobayashi		2, 4
(Germany) MRS GT-Racing	16	(Netherlands) Rudy van Buren	R	5
(Germany) MRS GT-Racing	16	(Hungary) Ádám Vincze	R	6
(Germany) MRS GT-Racing	16	(Turkey) Berkay Besler	R	7–8
(Germany) MRS Cup-Racing	17	(Argentina) Pablo Otero	PA	1–2
(Germany) MRS Cup-Racing	17	(Argentina) Dorian Mansilla	R	3–9
(Germany) MRS Cup-Racing	18	(Netherlands) Michael Verhagen		1–3, 7, 9
(Germany) MRS Cup-Racing	18	(United Kingdom) John Ferguson		4
(Germany) MRS Cup-Racing	18	(Germany) Siegfried Venema		5
(Germany) MRS Cup-Racing	18	(Sweden) Mats Karlsson		6, 8
(Germany) MRS Cup-Racing	19	(Brazil) Fernando Croce		1–6
(Germany) MRS Cup-Racing	19	(Australia) Brenton Grove	R	7
(Germany) MRS Cup-Racing	19	(Japan) Kenji Kobayashi		8
(Germany) MRS Cup-Racing	19	(Mexico) Ricardo Sanchez	G	9
(France) Pierre Martinet by Alméras	20	(Norway) Roar Lindland	PA	All
(France) Pierre Martinet by Alméras	21	(France) Clement Mateu	PA	1–2, 4–9
(France) Pierre Martinet by Alméras	21	(France) Marvin Klein	R	3
(France) Martinet by Alméras	22	(Turkey) Ayhancan Güven	R	All
(France) Martinet by Alméras	23	(Netherlands) Jaap van Lagen		All
(France) Martinet by Alméras	43	(France) Hugo Chevalier	G	6
(France) Martinet by Alméras	43	(France) Marvin Klein	G	7
(Germany) Team Project 1 - FACH	24	(Germany) Jannes Fittje	R	1
(Germany) Team Project 1 - FACH	24	(Germany) Stefan Rehkopf		2
(Germany) Team Project 1 - FACH	24	(Germany) Toni Wolf	R	3, 5–6
(Germany) Team Project 1 - FACH	24	(United Kingdom) Josh Webster		4
(Germany) Team Project 1 - FACH	24	(United States) Jean-François Brunot		7
(Germany) Team Project 1 - FACH	24	(Canada) Roman de Angelis	R	8
(Germany) Team Project 1 - FACH	24	(Colombia) Tatiana Calderón	G	9
(Germany) Team Project 1 - FACH	25	(Germany) Matthias Jeserich		2
(Germany) Team Project 1 - FACH	26	(Norway) Marius Nakken	R	All
Team Australia	27	(Australia) Joey Mawson	R	All
Team Australia	28	(Australia) Stephen Grove	PA	All
Team Australia	29	(Australia) Marc Cini	PA	All
(Netherlands) Team GP Elite	31	(Netherlands) Jesse van Kuijk	G	1, 6–8
(Netherlands) Team GP Elite	32	(Netherlands) Max van Splunteren	G	1, 6–8
(Netherlands) Team GP Elite	33	(Belgium) Lucas Groeneveld	G	7
(Germany) Huber Racing	34	(Poland) Igor Waliłko	G	3, 5, 8
(Germany) Huber Racing	35	(Germany) Richard Wagner	G	3
(Germany) Huber Racing	36	(Germany) Leon Köhler	G	3, 8
(Germany) Huber Racing	42	(Sweden) Henrik Skoog	G	5
(United Kingdom) JTR	37	(United Kingdom) Daniel Harper	G	4
(United Kingdom) JTR	38	(United Kingdom) Sebastian Perez	G	4
(United Kingdom) JTR	39	(United Kingdom) George Gamble	G	4
(Sweden) Porsche Carrera Cup Scandinavia	40	(Sweden) Pontus Fredricsson	G	5
(Sweden) Porsche Carrera Cup Scandinavia	41	(Sweden) Robin Hansson	G	5
(Germany) Dr. Ing h. c. F. Porsche AG	911	(United Kingdom) Chris Hoy	G	4
Entry Lists

Icon	Class
PA	Pro-Am Cup
R	Rookie
G	Guest

== Race calendar and results ==
Round	Circuit	Date	Pole position	Fastest lap	Winning driver	Winning team
1	(Spain) Circuit de Catalunya, Barcelona	12 May	(France) Julien Andlauer	(France) Julien Andlauer	(France) Julien Andlauer	(Austria) BWT Lechner Racing
2	Circuit de Monaco, Monte Carlo	26 May	(Germany) Michael Ammermüller	(Denmark) Mikkel O. Pedersen	(Germany) Michael Ammermüller	(Austria) BWT Lechner Racing
3	(Austria) Red Bull Ring, Spielberg	30 June	(France) Julien Andlauer	(Germany) Michael Ammermüller	(France) Julien Andlauer	(Austria) BWT Lechner Racing
4	(United Kingdom) Silverstone Circuit, Silverstone	14 July	(Turkey) Ayhancan Güven	(France) Julien Andlauer	(Turkey) Ayhancan Güven	(France) martinet by Alméras
5	(Germany) Hockenheimring, Baden-Württemberg	28 July	(Netherlands) Larry ten Voorde	(Luxembourg) Dylan Pereira	(Luxembourg) Dylan Pereira	(United States) Momo Megatron Lechner Racing Team
6	(Hungary) Hungaroring, Budapest	4 August	(France) Julien Andlauer (Note: Tio Ellinas took pole, but his fastest lap time was disallowed for being set under yellow flag conditions, demoting him to fourth position.)	(France) Julien Andlauer	(Germany) Michael Ammermüller	(Austria) BWT Lechner Racing
7	(Belgium) Circuit de Spa-Francorchamps, Stavelot	1 September	(Luxembourg) Dylan Pereira	(New Zealand) Jaxon Evans	(Luxembourg) Dylan Pereira	(United States) Momo Megatron Lechner Racing Team
8	(Italy) Autodromo Nazionale Monza, Monza	8 September	(New Zealand) Jaxon Evans	(Denmark) Mikkel O. Pedersen	(Netherlands) Larry ten Voorde	(Germany) MRS GT-Racing
9	Autódromo Hermanos Rodríguez, Mexico City	26 October	(Germany) Michael Ammermüller	(Netherlands) Larry ten Voorde	(Germany) Michael Ammermüller	(Austria) BWT Lechner Racing
10	Autódromo Hermanos Rodríguez, Mexico City	27 October	(Germany) Michael Ammermüller	(Germany) Michael Ammermüller	(Germany) Michael Ammermüller	(Austria) BWT Lechner Racing

== Championship standings ==
=== Drivers' Championship ===
Pos.	Driver	CAT (Spain)	MON (Monaco)	RBR (Austria)	SIL (United Kingdom)	HOC‡ (Germany)	HUN (Hungary)	SPA (Belgium)	MNZ (Italy)	MEX (Mexico)		Points
1	(Germany) Michael Ammermüller	3	1	2	6	Ret	1	8	2	1	1	150
2	(Turkey) Ayhancan Güven	2	5	Ret	1	12	8	2	5	2	2	124
3	(France) Julien Andlauer	1	7	1	2	4	2	9	Ret	4	5	118
4	(Netherlands) Larry ten Voorde		3	3	4	2	3	4	1	5	9	115
5	(France) Florian Latorre	12	4	5	3	5	6	5	9	13	8	87
6	(New Zealand) Jaxon Evans	8	9	9	5	10	11	3	6	14	3	83
7	(Cyprus) Tio Ellinas	4	8	10	16	3	4	6	11	3	11	81
8	(Denmark) Mikkel O. Pedersen	6	2	6	7	Ret	16	10	4	Ret	6	80
9	(Luxembourg) Dylan Pereira	13	Ret	7	12	1	5	1	7	Ret	4	73
10	(Netherlands) Jaap van Lagen	5	6	4	10	6	Ret	7	10	6	13	71
11	(Australia) Joey Mawson	11	13	12	9	7	9	11	3	8	10	63
12	(Oman) Al Faisal Al Zubair	7	10	11	11	8	10	13	8	11	12	52
13	(Italy) Gianmarco Quaresmini	9	19	14	17	15	7	16	16	9	15	33
14	(Norway) Marius Nakken	19	21	17	14	13	17	17	13	7	7	29
15	(Thailand) Kantadhee Kusiri	17	11	16	23	16	Ret	19	20	10	14	14
16	(France) Marvin Klein			8				Ret				8
17	(Norway) Roar Lindland	15	12	20	20	20	18	24	22	19	23	7
18	(Germany) Toni Wolf			13		DNS	14					7
19	(Turkey) Berkay Besler							12	19			5
20	(Argentina) Dorian Mansilla			21	22	21	21	23	Ret	12	17	4
21	(South Africa) Saul Hack	14	15	18	21	19	19	25	21	18	16	4
22	(Germany) Stefan Rehkopf		14									2
23	(Canada) Roman de Angelis								17			2
24	(Austria) Philipp Sager	21	16	24	25	22	22	26	23	16	21	1
25	(Germany) Jannes Fittje	16										1
26	(United Kingdom) Josh Webster				18							1
27	(Australia) Stephen Grove	23	22	25	24	25	23	29	25	17	22	0
28	(Germany) Matthias Jeserich		17									0
29	(France) Nicolas Misslin	20	18									0
30	(France) Enzo Guibbert	18										0
31	(Netherlands) Loek Hartog							18				0
32	(Netherlands) Michael Verhagen	24	Ret	23				27		20	20	0
33	(France) Clément Mateu	Ret	20		26	26	24	28	24	DNS	DNS	0
34	(Australia) Brenton Grove							20				0
35	(Australia) Marc Cini	25	DNQ	26	31	28	28	31	27	21	24	0
36	(South Africa) Ewan Taylor			22	27	24	25					0
37	(Netherlands) Rudy van Buren					23						0
38	(Sweden) Mats Karlsson						26		26			0
39	(Argentina) Pablo Otero	26	DNQ									0
40	(Brazil) Fernando Croce	27	DNQ	29†	29	27	Ret					0
41	(Hungary) Ádám Vincze						27					0
42	(Japan) Kenji Kobayashi		DNQ		32				28			0
43	(Germany) Siegfried Venema					29						0
44	(Finland) Jukka Honkavuori								29			0
45	(United Kingdom) John Ferguson				30							0
46	(United States) Jean-François Brunot							30				0
Guest drivers ineligible for points
-	(United Kingdom) Daniel Harper				8							0
-	(Germany) Leon Köhler			15		9			14			0
-	(Netherlands) Max van Splunteren	10					15	15	12			0
-	(Poland) Igor Waliłko			27		11			15			0
-	(France) Hugo Chevalier						12					0
-	(France) Jean-Baptiste Simmenauer			19	15		13	14				0
-	(United Kingdom) George Gamble				13							0
-	(Sweden) Henrik Skoog					14						0
-	(Mexico) Ricardo Sanchez									15	18	0
-	(Sweden) Robin Hansson					17						0
-	(Netherlands) Jesse van Kuijk	22					20	22	18			0
-	(Sweden) Pontus Fredricsson					18						0
-	(Argentina) Ariel Pacho									Ret	19	0
-	(United Kingdom) Sebastian Perez				19							0
-	(Belgium) Lucas Groeneveld							21				0
-	(Colombia) Tatiana Calderón									Ret	25	0
-	(Germany) Richard Wagner			28								0
-	(United Kingdom) Chris Hoy				28							0
-	(Italy) Alberto Cerqui								Ret			0

‡ No points were awarded at the Hockenheimring round as less than 50% of the scheduled race distance was completed.

Notes

† – Drivers did not finish the race, but were classified as they completed over 75% of the race distance.

^ – Drivers took part in the races with different competition numbers
