= Larry ten Voorde =

Dutch racing driver (born 1996)

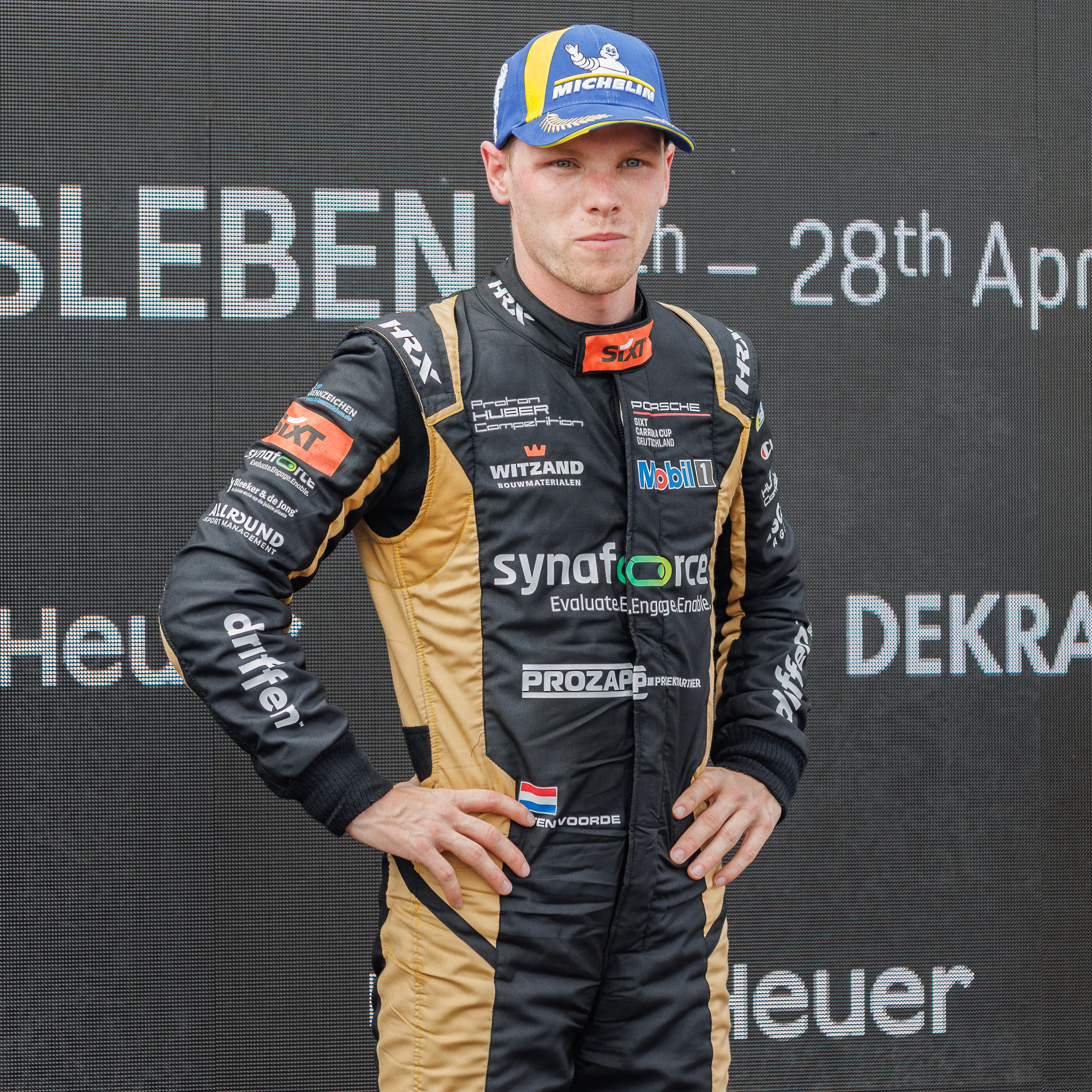
- Ten Voorde in 2024
- Nationality: (Netherlands) Dutch
- Born: 2 October 1996 (age 30) Enschede, Netherlands

Porsche Supercup career
- Debut season: 2016
- Current team: Schumacher CLRT
- Categorisation: FIA Silver (until 2020); FIA Gold (2021–)
- Car number: 25
- Starts: 60
- Championships: 3
- Wins: 14
- Podiums: 34
- Poles: 13
- Fastest laps: 8
- Best finish: 1st in 2020, 2021, 2024

Larry ten Voorde (born 2 October 1996, in Enschede) is a Dutch racing driver who currently competes in the GT World Challenge Europe Endurance Cup for Schumacher CLRT. A longtime competitor in various Porsche series, Ten Voorde won the Porsche Supercup in 2020, 2021 and 2024, as well as the Porsche Carrera Cup Germany in 2020, 2021, and 2023. He also competes part-time in the Porsche Carrera Cup Benelux.

== Early career ==
Following an early spell in karting during which he won the German Rotax Max Challenge in various age categories, ten Voorde made his car racing debut in 2013, competing in the Formula Renault 1.6 NEC series. Having started his campaign for Van Amersfoort Racing with a pole position in the opening two rounds, he moved to B&W Motorsport for the remainder of the campaign, scoring five podiums — including his maiden win at a red-flagged Zandvoort event — on his way to fourth in the standings. Notably, ten Voorde helped his teammate Roy Geerts to win that season's title, letting him through to take the lead on the final lap of the final race. He remained in the series in 2014, although an early double podium at Zandvoort and a pair of poles at Zolder would be the only highlights for him that year, one which ten Voorde ended without partaking in the final two rounds. Subsequently, he forewent the 2015 racing season entirely due to a lack of budget.

== Porsche Cup career ==
In 2016, ten Voorde was able to return to car racing after supposedly impressing teams with his coaching activities during his time spent on the sidelines, winning the Porsche Super Sports Cup. He also drove in the Spa event of the F1-supporting Porsche Supercup with race:pro motorsport, finishing eighth. This proved to be a gateway, as the Dutch driver entered the Porsche Carrera Cup Germany for the 2017 season, driving for Team Project 1. Though Ten Voorde's only win would come at the sparsely-attended round at the Nürburgring, he managed to finish fifth overall, taking five podiums overall and finishing first in the rookies' standings. The following year, Ten Voorde remained in PCCG, though he would combine his season with a campaign in the Porsche Supercup. In the former, the domination of Thomas Preining and Michael Ammermüller left Ten Voorde in third place overall, which he scored after collecting six podiums. His Supercup season did not hold such strong results, as he finished tenth in the standings with a best result of fourth at Silverstone.

For the 2019 season, ten Voorde switched teams, driving for MRS GT-Racing in the Supercup and Overdrive Racing by Huber in PCCG. Despite missing the season opener in the former championship, he would come through to finish the year fourth in points with five podiums, one of which turned out to be his first series victory at Monza. In Germany meanwhile, an early winning spree helped him to establish an early gap at the top of the standings. However, a pair of retirements at the Norisring and a non-points finish at Zandvoort undid ten Voorde's advantage, leaving him in a third place overall due to multiple victories from Michael Ammermüller and eventual champion Julien Andlauer. Despite a win at the final race, Ten Voorde finished third in the championship.

At the end of 2019, ten Voorde joined Team Project 1 in the LMGTE Am class of the FIA World Endurance Championship for two races, which he finished second at Shanghai and first in Bahrain as the team's silver-ranked driver, having partnered pro driver Jeroen Bleekemolen and bronze Ben Keating. He returned to the team to contest the final pair of events at Le Mans and Bahrain during the autumn of 2020, the latter of which he ended with another victory to take him to third in the drivers' standings. His main focus in 2020 would lie on another double campaign in the Supercup and PCCG. Ten Voorde controlled the German championship from start to finish, landing on the podium in all eleven races and winning four of them on his way to the title. His campaign in the Porsche Supercup, which he contested for Team GP Elite, ended up as a hard-fought battle between the Dutchman and Luxembourg's Dylan Pereira, with both drivers standing at two wins apiece before the final round at Monza. There, a dominant performance from ten Voorde proved to be decisive, with him taking over the championship lead for his first Supercup title.

The 2021 campaign saw ten Voorde partake both series with GP Elite. He started the Supercup campaign in style, winning three of the opening four events, including a debut win at the Circuit de Monaco. After finishing in the points during the next two races, a podium at the first Monza brought ten Voorde the title with a race to spare — which he would use to cap off his season with another victory on Sunday. The PCCG campaign contained shades of similar dominance, as he won half of the 16 races and finished off the rostrum just three times. Once again, ten Voorde clinched the title one race early, winning the first Hockenheim race to beat Ayhancan Güven to the crown.

Ten Voorde remained in both championships during his third year with GP Elite, entering 2022 as a defending double-champion. His Supercup season began with three successive podiums, including another win at Monaco, though a collision caused by Marvin Klein at the Red Bull Ring set him back on his title quest. He finished third at Le Castellet, second at Spa, and third at Zandvoort to tee up a final battle with Dylan Pereira in Italy. Despite a penalty for the Luxembourger, second place for ten Voorde was not enough, with him missing ten points to Pereira. Over in the German championship, ten Voorde had to wait for his first win until race six at Imola, by which stage Laurin Heinrich had built up an advantage at the top of the standings. Further wins at Zandvoort and the Nürburgring closed up the fight, although a finish out of the points at the Lausitzring and a double victory for Heinrich during the Sachsenring event put the title out of reach for ten Voorde. He ended this campaign second in the results sheets too, having won the two final races at the Hockenheimring.

In 2023, ten Voorde retained his place at GP Elite in the Supercup and PCCG, although he would combine these duties with a season in the Porsche Carrera Cup Italy, which he contested with Enrico Fulgenzi Racing. In that championship, ten Voorde won five races and finished on the podium two further times, giving him the title despite missing two rounds. Another title would come in Germany, where the Dutch driver dominated the first half of the season by winning five of the opening eight races. Even though a number of young drivers came through to challenge the veteran, most notably teammate Loek Hartog, ten Voorde took two more wins on his way to a third PCCG championship. His venture in the Supercup saw two runner-up finishes to start the season, before he was forced to retire at Silverstone following a multi-car collision at the start. Two top tens in the next races were followed by a pair of third places at Zandvoort, once again bringing ten Voorde into a final decider at Monza, this time being 21 points behind Bastian Buus. Ten Voorde drove a strong race but narrowly missed out on victory to Harry King, leaving him to finish five points behind Buus for his second successive runner-up finish in the Supercup.

After four years with GP Elite, ten Voorde moved away in 2024, contesting the Porsche Supercup with Schumacher CLRT, remaining with Enrico Fulgenzi Racing in PCCI, and entering the PCCG with Proton Huber Competition. Before the year started, he made his debut at the 24 Hours of Daytona with MDK Motorsports, finishing 12th in the GTD class. Ten Voorde began his campaign in the Supercup in complete control, winning the opening four races at Imola, Monaco, Spielberg, and Silverstone to create a gap at the front of the standings. Despite missing out on the podium in the next two races, ten Voorde kept the championship lead, before taking his fifth win at Zandvoort. The result meant that he would only have to finish 12th at Monza to clinch the title, and he subsequently went on to claim the Supercup crown for a third time by finishing second, having lost the lead to teammate Alessandro Ghiretti. Ten Voorde beat young title rival Harry King by 23 points in the final table. Following his title win, ten Voorde revealed that this had been his final season in the Porsche Supercup.

== Racing record ==
=== Career summary ===
Season	Series	Team	Races	Wins	Poles	F/Laps	Podiums	Points	Position
2013	Formula Renault 1.6 NEC	Van Amersfoort Racing	4	0	1	0	0	213	4th
2013	Formula Renault 1.6 NEC	B&W Motorsport	8	1	2	2	5	213	4th
2014	Formula Renault 1.6 NEC	Pirosport	6	0	0	0	2	90	12th
2014	Formula Renault 1.6 NEC	MB Motorsport	2	0	2	0	0	90	12th
2016	Porsche Super Sports Cup	race:pro motorsport	?	?	?	?	?	?	**1st**
2016	Porsche Supercup	race:pro motorsport	1	0	0	0	0	0	NC†
2017	Porsche Carrera Cup Germany	Team Deutsche Post by Project 1	16	1	2	2	5	155	5th
2018	Porsche Supercup	Team Project 1	10	0	0	0	0	80	10th
2018	Porsche Carrera Cup Germany	Team Deutsche Post by Project 1	14	0	0	0	6	170	**3rd**
2019	Porsche Supercup	MRS GT-Racing	9	1	1	1	5	114	4th
2019	Porsche Carrera Cup Germany	Overdrive Racing by Huber	16	5	5	2	7	220	**3rd**
2019-20	FIA World Endurance Championship - LMGTE Am	Team Project 1	4	2	1	0	3	119	**3rd**
2020	Porsche Supercup	Team GP Elite	8	3	3	2	6	155	**1st**
2020	Porsche Carrera Cup Germany	Nebulus Racing by Huber	11	4	3	1	11	211	**1st**
2020	24H GT Series - 991	race:pro motorsport	1	0	1	0	1	26	5th
2021	Porsche Supercup	Team GP Elite	8	4	4	2	6	155	**1st**
2021	Porsche Carrera Cup Germany	Team GP Elite	16	8	8	4	13	326	**1st**
2021	24H GT Series - 991	Nebulus Racing by Huber	1	0	0	0	0	0	NC
2022	Porsche Supercup	Team GP Elite	8	1	2	1	7	139	**2nd**
2022	Porsche Carrera Cup Germany	Team GP Elite	16	5	4	6	9	266	**2nd**
2022	24H GT Series - 992	Team GP Elite	2	1	2	2	2	28	**2nd**
2022-23	Middle East Trophy - 992	Fach Auto Tech	1	0	0	0	0	0	NC
2023	Porsche Supercup	Team GP Elite	8	0	2	0	5	117	**2nd**
2023	Porsche Carrera Cup Germany	Team GP Elite	16	7	7	4	15	330	**1st**
2023	Porsche Carrera Cup Italy	Enrico Fulgenzi Racing	8	5	3	4	7	177	**1st**
2023	Porsche Carrera Cup Benelux	JW Raceservice	2	2	2	2	2	0	NC†
2024	Porsche Supercup	Schumacher CLRT	8	5	5	4	6	168	**1st**
2024	Porsche Carrera Cup Germany	Proton Huber Competition	16	3	2	4	11	278	**1st**
2024	Porsche Carrera Cup Italy	Enrico Fulgenzi Racing	10	4	7	6	6	176	**2nd**
2024	IMSA SportsCar Championship - GTD	MDK Motorsports	1	0	0	0	0	8	54th
2024	Porsche Carrera Cup Benelux	JW Raceservice	2	2	0	2	2	0	NC†
2024	24 Hours of Nürburgring - Cup2	Scherer Sport PHX	1	0	0	0	1	N/A	**2nd**
2025	GT World Challenge Europe Endurance Cup	Schumacher CLRT	2	0	0	0	0	10	17th

=== Complete Porsche Supercup results ===
(key) (Races in bold indicate pole position) (Races in italics indicate fastest lap)

Year	Team	1	2	3	4	5	6	7	8	9	10	Pos.	Points
2016	race:pro motorsport	CAT	MON	RBR	SIL	HUN	HOC	SPA; 8	MNZ	USA	USA	NC†	0
2018	Team Project 1	CAT; 6	MON; 9	RBR; 8	SIL; 4	HOC; 9	HUN; 8	SPA; 10	MNZ; 28	MEX; 7	MEX; 6	10th	80
2019	MRS GT-Racing	CAT	MON; 3	**RBR**; 3	SIL; 4	**HOC**; 2^{‡}	HUN; 3	SPA; 4	MNZ; 1	MEX; 5	MEX; 9	4th	115
2020	Team GP Elite	RBR; 4	RBR; 3	HUN; 3	**SIL**; 1	SIL; 2	**CAT**; 1	SPA; 5	**MNZ**; 1			1st	155
2021	Team GP Elite	**MON**; 1	**RBR**; 1	RBR; 3	HUN; 1	SPA; 8	ZND; 5	MNZ; 3	**MNZ**; 1			1st	155
2022	Team GP Elite	IMO; 2	MON; 1	SIL; 2	RBR; 29	LEC; 3	SPA; 2	ZND; 3	MNZ; 2			2nd	139
2023	GP Elite	**MON**; 2	**RBR**; 2	SIL; 27†	HUN; 4	SPA; 7	ZND1; 3	ZND2; 3	MNZ; 2			2nd	117
2024	Schumacher CLRT	**IMO**; 1	**MON**; 1	RBR; 1	**SIL**; 1	HUN; 7	SPA; 4	ZND; 1	MNZ; 2			1st	168

^{‡} No points were awarded at the Hockenheimring round as less than 50% of the scheduled race distance was completed.

=== Complete Porsche Carrera Cup Germany results ===
(key) (Races in bold indicate pole position) (Races in italics indicate fastest lap)

Year	Team	1	2	3	4	5	6	7	8	9	10	11	12	13	14	15	16	DC	Points
2017	Team Deutsche Post by Project 1	HOC1; 1; 6	HOC1; 2; 5	LAU; 1; 14	LAU; 2 Ret	**RBR**; **1**; 2	RBR; 2; 4	NOR; 1; 4	NOR; 2; 5	**NÜR1**; **1**; 2	NÜR1; 2; 1	NÜR2; 1; 5	NÜR2; 2; 5	SAC; 1; 3	SAC; 2; 2	HOC; 1 Ret	HOC; 2; 8	5th	155
2018	Team Deutsche Post by Project 1	OSC; 1; 4	OSC; 2; 8	RBR; 1; 3	RBR; 2; 3	NÜR1; 1; 3	NÜR1; 2; 5	NÜR2; 1; 4	NÜR2; 2; 4	ZAN; 1; 9	ZAN; 2; 3	SAC; 1; 5	SAC; 2; 3	HOC; 1; 12	HOC; 2; 3			3rd	220
2019	Overdrive Racing by Huber	**HOC1**; **1**; 1	**HOC1**; **2**; 1	MST; 1; 1	MST; 2; 2	**RBR**; **1**; 1	RBR; 2; 4	NOR; 1 Ret	NOR; 2 Ret	ZAN; 1; 5	ZAN; 2; 26	NÜR; 1; 9	NÜR; 2; 4	HOC2; 1; 5	HOC2; 2; 6	**SAC**; **1**; 2	SAC; 2; 1	3rd	220
2020	Nebulus Racing by Huber	**LMS**; 1	**SAC**; **1**; 2	**SAC**; **2**; 1	SAC; 3; 2	RBR; 1; 2	RBR; 2; 2	RBR; 3; 3	**LAU**; **1**; 1	**LAU**; **2**; 2	OSC; 1; 2	OSC; 2; 1						1st	236
2021	Team GP Elite	**SPA**; **1**; 1	**SPA**; **2**; 1	OSC; 1; 2	OSC; 2; 3	RBR; 1; 2	RBR; 2; 6	**MNZ1**; **1**; 1	**MNZ1**; **2**; 1	**ZAN**; **1**; 1	ZAN; 2; 5	**MNZ2**; **1**; 4	**MNZ2**; **2**; 1	SAC; 1; 1	SAC; 2; 4	**HOC**; **1**; 1	**HOC**; **2**; 2	1st	326
2022	Team GP Elite	SPA; 1; 3	SPA; 2; 5	RBR; 1; 4	RBR; 2; 5	IMO; 1; 3	**IMO**; **2**; 1	**ZAN**; **1**; 2	**ZAN**; **2**; 1	NÜR; 1; 1	NÜR; 2; 6	LAU; 1; 23	LAU; 2; 2	SAC; 1; 5	SAC; 2; 4	**HOC**; **1**; 1	HOC; 2; 1	2nd	266
2023	Team GP Elite	SPA; 1; 2	**SPA**; **2**; 2	HOC1; 1; 1	HOC1; 2; 3	**ZAN**; **1**; 1	**ZAN**; **2**; 1	**NÜR**; **1**; 1	**NÜR**; **2**; 1	LAU; 1; 2	LAU; 2; 3	SAC; 1; 3	SAC; 2; 2	RBR; 1; 1	RBR; 2; 5	**HOC2**; **1**; 3	**HOC2**; **2**; 1	1st	330
2024	Proton Huber Competition	IMO; 1; 2	IMO; 2; 2	OSC; 1; 8	OSC; 2; 1	**ZAN**; **1**; 1	ZAN; 2; 1	HUN; 1; 2	HUN; 2; 6	**NÜR**; **1**; 2	NÜR; 2; 2	SAC; 1; 3	SAC; 2; 2	RBR; 1; 3	RBR; 2; 4	HOC; 1; 6	HOC; 2; 6	1st	278

^{*}Season still in progress.

=== Complete FIA World Endurance Championship results ===
(key) (Races in bold indicate pole position; races in italics indicate fastest lap)

Year	Entrant	Class	Car	Engine	1	2	3	4	5	6	7	8	Rank	Points
2019–20	Team Project 1	LMGTE Am	Porsche 911 RSR	Porsche M97/80 4.0 L Flat-6	SIL	FUJ	SHA; 2	BHR; 1	COA	SPA	LMS; 4	BHR; 1	3rd	119

=== Complete IMSA SportsCar Championship results ===
(key) (Races in bold indicate pole position; results in italics indicate fastest lap)

Year	Entrant	Class	Chassis	Engine	1	2	3	4	5	6	7	8	9	10	Points	Pos
2024	MDK Motorsports	GTD	Porsche 911 GT3 R (992)	Porsche M97/80 4.2 L Flat-6	DAY; 12	SEB	LBH	LGA	WGL	MOS	ELK	VIR	IMS	PET	222	8th

=== Complete 24 Hours of Le Mans results ===
Year	Team	Co-Drivers	Car	Class	Laps	Pos.	Class Pos.
2020	(Germany) Team Project 1	(Italy) Matteo Cairoli (Norway) Egidio Perfetti	Porsche 911 RSR	GTE; Am	339	27th	4th
2024	(United Kingdom) JMW Motorsport	(Italy) Giacomo Petrobelli (Turkey) Salih Yoluç	Ferrari 296 GT3	LMGT3	112	DNF	DNF

=== Complete GT World Challenge Europe results ===
==== GT World Challenge Europe Endurance Cup ====
Year	Team	Car	Class	1	2	3	4	5	6	7	Pos.	Points
2025	Schumacher CLRT	Porsche 911 GT3 R (992)	Pro	LEC	MNZ; 6	SPA; 6H	SPA; 12H	SPA; 24H	NÜR	CAT; 9	17th	10

Sporting positions
Preceded by Michael Ammermüller	Porsche Supercup; Champion; 2020 - 2021	Succeeded by Dylan Pereira
Preceded by Julien Andlauer	Porsche Carrera Cup Germany; Winner; 2020 - 2021	Succeeded by Laurin Heinrich
Preceded by Laurin Heinrich	Porsche Carrera Cup Germany; Winner; 2023 - 2024	Succeeded by Incumbent
Preceded by Bastian Buus	Porsche Supercup; Champion; 2024	Succeeded by Incumbent
