= Max van Splunteren =

Dutch racing driver (born 1996)

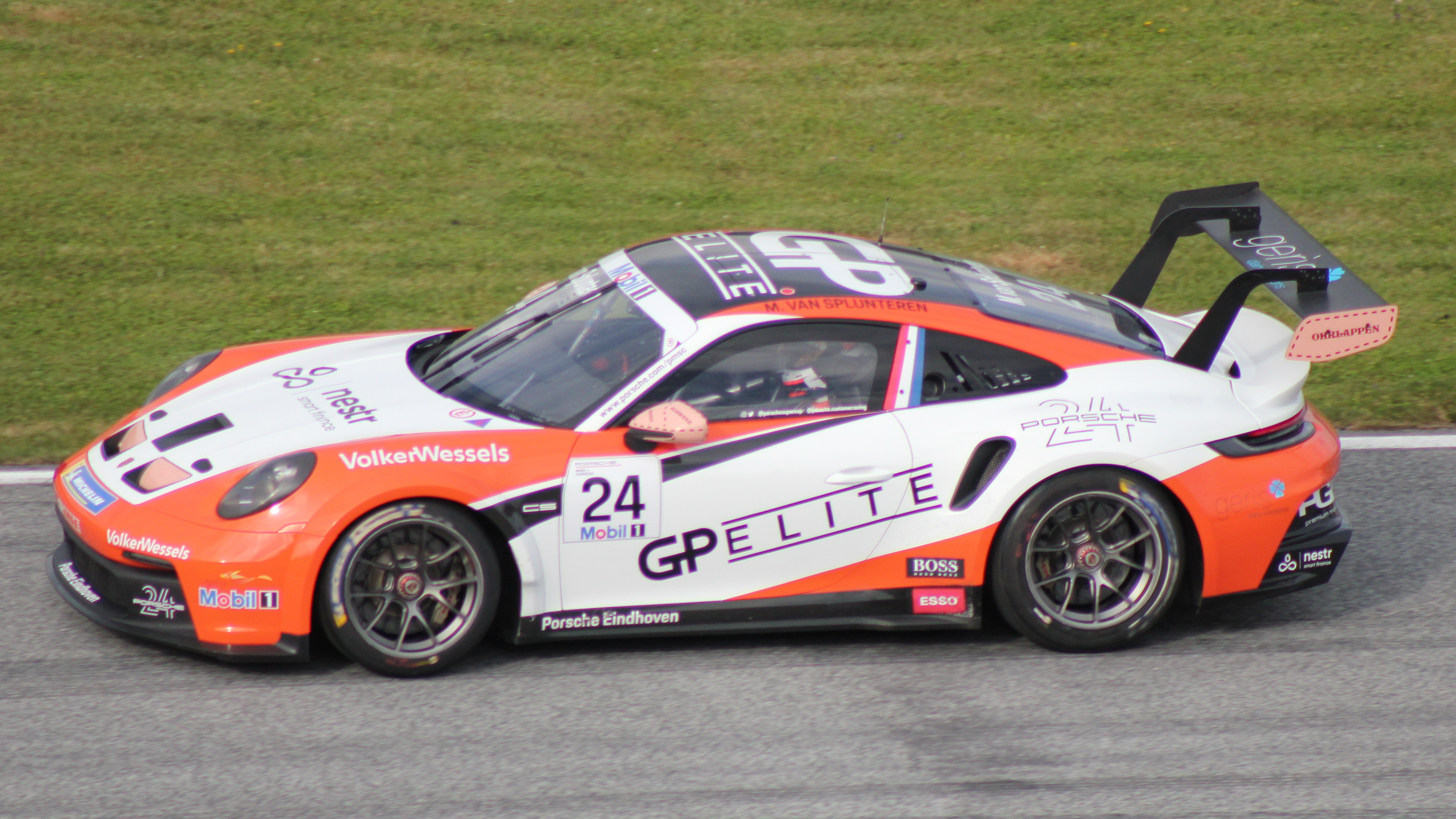
- Van Splunteren in 2021
- Nationality: (Netherlands) Dutch
- Born: 29 January 1996 (age 30) Leiderdorp, Netherlands
- Relatives: Paul van Splunteren (father)
- Categorisation: FIA Silver

Championship titles
- 2019: Porsche Carrera Cup Benelux

Max van Splunteren (born 29 January 1996) is a Dutch racing driver who last competed in the 24H Series for GP Elite.

== Personal life ==
Van Splunteren is the son of fellow racing driver Paul van Splunteren, who he replaced for the last three rounds of the 2014 European Le Mans Series.

== Career ==
Van Splunteren made his single-seater debut in 2012, racing in the Dutch Formula Ford Championship for GT3.nl Junior Team by GEVA Racing. Despite never winning a race throughout the season, Van Splunteren finished on the podium in 11 races en route to a third-place points finish. Continuing in Formula Ford for 2013, Van Splunteren raced in the International North Sea Series, in which he scored his maiden career wins at Snetterton and Zandvoort. During 2013, Van Splunteren also raced in select rounds of Porsche GT3 Cup Challenge Benelux for Porsche Groep Zuid, winning six of the eight races he contested to take eighth in the Cup standings.

Switching to sportscars full-time for 2014, Van Splunteren joined GT3.nl by Land Motorsport to continue racing in Porsche GT3 Cup Challenge Benelux. Competing in select rounds, Van Splunteren won both races at Zolder, before taking further wins at Zandvoort and the second Zolder round to end the season seventh in points. During 2014, Van Splunteren also joined Prospeed Competition to race in the last three rounds of the European Le Mans Series replacing his father Paul, in the GTC class.

Continuing in Porsche GT3 Cup Challenge Benelux for 2015, Van Splunteren began the season by winning both Spa races and race one at Zolder, before scoring a win at Zandvoort and five other podiums to secure runner-up honours in the Pro standings. During 2015, Van Splunteren also joined Bentley Team HTP to race in the final four rounds of the Blancpain Sprint Series, as well as the 24 Hours of Spa. Partnering Jules Szymkowiak for his part-time BSS campaign, Van Splunteren took five class wins and a best overall result of sixth at Zandvoort to end the season fourth in Silver Cup points.

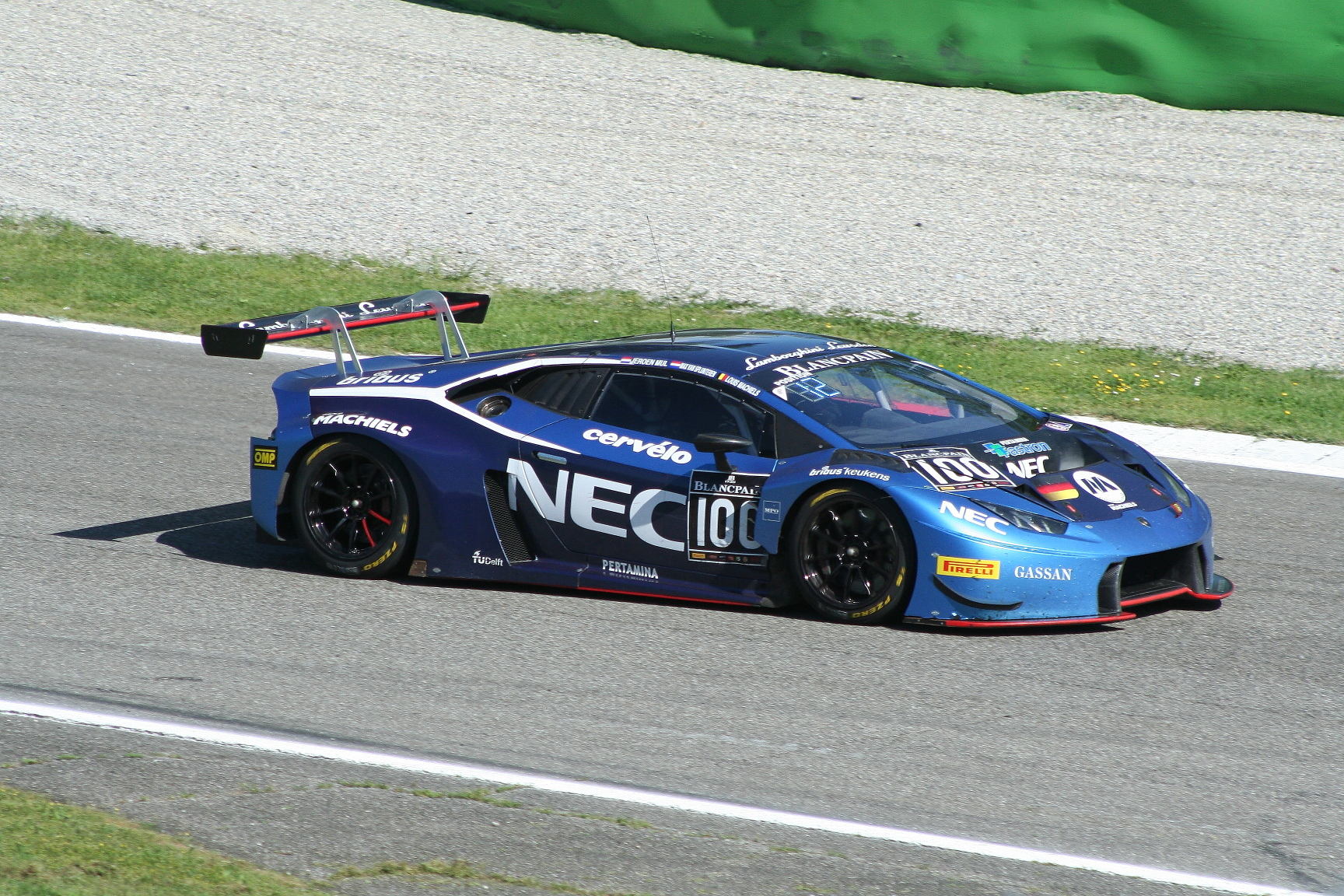
Van Splunteren's Attempto Lamborghini Huracán GT3 at Monza in 2016.

In 2016, Van Splunteren remained in GT3 competition as he joined Lamborghini-fielding Attempto Racing for a dual campaign in the Blancpain GT Series Endurance and Sprint Cups, as a member of the Lamborghini Junior Driver Programme. Between the two campaigns, Van Splunteren found more success in the Sprint Cup, taking five Silver podiums alongside Jeroen Mul and finishing sixth in points. Continuing with Attempto for a similar campaign the following year, Van Splunteren once again found more success in the Sprint Cup, scoring three podiums and ending the season sixth in points again.

After racing at the 24 Hours of Daytona for Lamborghini-affiliated GRT Grasser Racing Team in early 2018, Van Splunteren returned to Porsche GT3 Cup Challenge Benelux for the rest of the year with GP Elite. On his return to the series, Van Splunteren scored a lone win at Zandvoort and five other podiums en route to a third-place points finish. Remaining with Team GP Elite for the following season, Van Splunteren took seven wins and four other podiums to seal the Porsche Carrera Cup Benelux title.

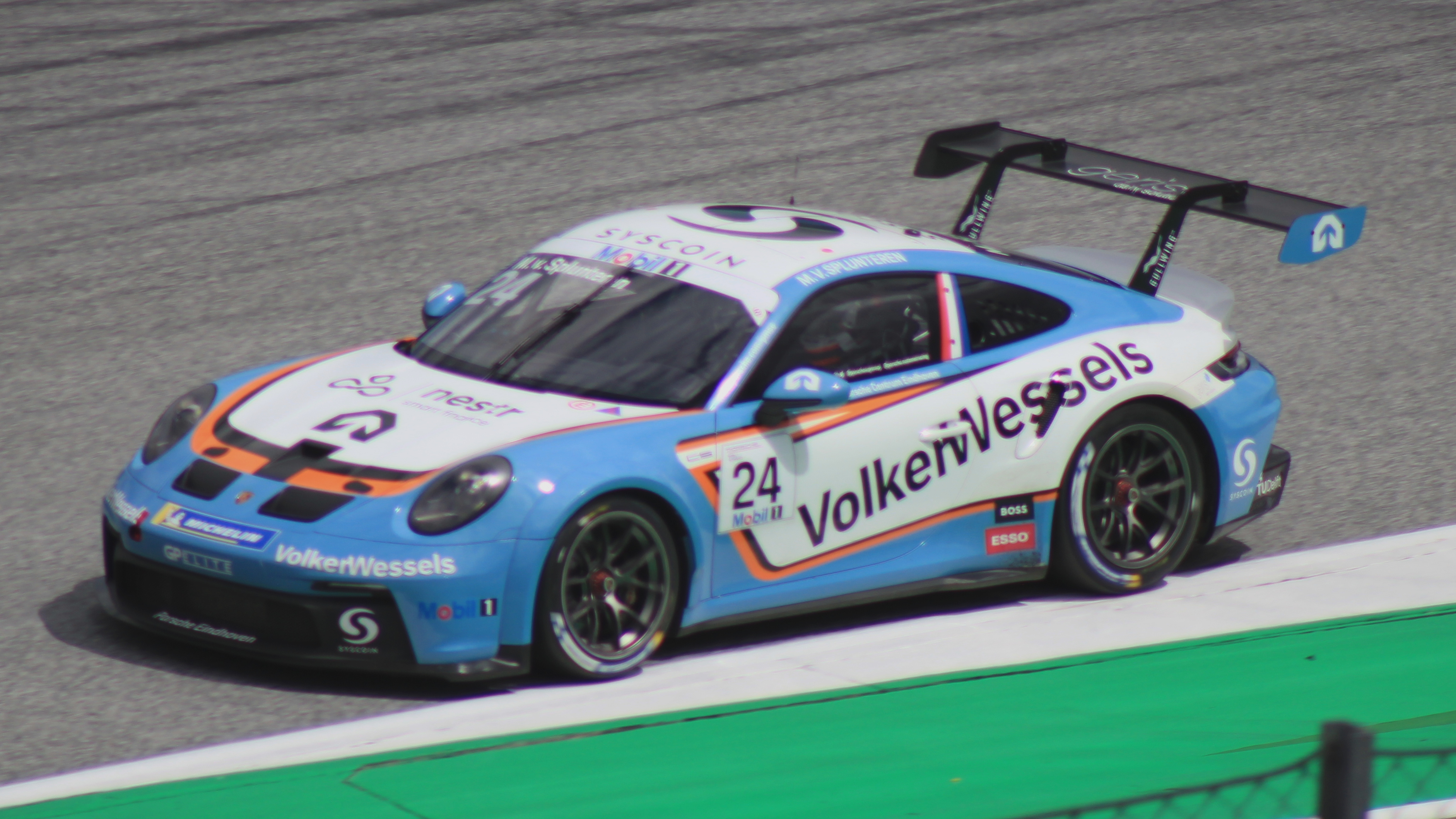
Van Splunteren racing for GP Elite at the Red Bull Ring during the 2022 Porsche Supercup.

Remaining with GP Elite for 2020, but switching to Porsche Supercup, Van Splunteren took a lone podium at Silverstone in his first full-time season in the series to end the year sixth overall. During 2020, Van Splunteren also raced with Porsche-aligned Proton Competition at the 24 Hours of Le Mans in LMGTE Am alongside Horst Felbermayr Jr. and Michele Beretta. Two seasons with GP Elite in both Porsche Supercup and Carrera Cup Germany then followed, before Van Splunteren only made sporadic appearances over the following two seasons, most notably winning the 2024 12 Hours of Mugello overall with GP Elite.

== Racing record ==
=== Racing career summary ===
Season	Series	Team	Races	Wins	Poles	F/Laps	Podiums	Points	Position
2012	Dutch Formula Ford Championship	GT3.nl Junior Team by GEVA Racing	18	0	1	2	11	244	**3rd**
2012	British Formula Ford Championship	GEVA	3	0	0	0	0	0	NC†
2012	Formula Ford Festival – Duratec		1	0	0	0	0	—N/a	5th
2012–13	Dutch Winter Endurance Series	Equipe Verschuur	1	1	0	0	1	20	17th
2013	Formula Ford International North Sea Series		13	2	1	7	10		
2013	Formula Ford Denmark		2	0	0	0	0	6	18th
2013	Porsche GT3 Cup Challenge Benelux – Cup	Porsche Groep Zuid	8	6	1	6	7	124	8th
2014	Porsche GT3 Cup Challenge Benelux	GT3.nl by Land Motorsport	10	4	3	2	6	142	7th
2014	European Le Mans Series – GTC	Prospeed Competition	3	0	0	0	0	6	25th
2015	Porsche GT3 Cup Challenge Benelux – Pro	GT3.nl by Land Motorsport	11	4	3	4	9	114	**2nd**
2015	Blancpain Sprint Series	Bentley Team HTP	7	0	0	0	0	10	20th
2015	Blancpain Sprint Series – Silver	Bentley Team HTP	7	5	3	5	5	77	4th
2015	Blancpain Endurance Series – Pro-Am	Bentley Team HTP	1	0	0	0	0	4	27th
2015	Renault Sport Trophy – Prestige	Equipe Verschuur	2	0	0	0	0	0	NC†
2015	Renault Sport Trophy – Endurance Trophy	Equipe Verschuur	1	0	0	0	0	0	NC†
2015	BMW M235i Cup Belgium	Tyreset / Peka Racing	1	0	0	0	0	41	24th
2016	Blancpain GT Series Endurance Cup	Attempto Racing	5	0	0	0	0	0	NC
2016	Blancpain GT Series Endurance Cup – Pro-Am	Attempto Racing	5	0	0	0	0	29	16th
2016	Blancpain GT Series Sprint Cup	Attempto Racing	10	0	0	0	0	0	NC
2016	Blancpain GT Series Sprint Cup – Silver	Attempto Racing	8	0	0	4	5	60	6th
2017	Blancpain GT Series Endurance Cup	Attempto Racing	5	0	0	0	0	0	NC
2017	Blancpain GT Series Endurance Cup – Pro-Am	Attempto Racing	4	0	0	0	0	4	43rd
2017	Blancpain GT Series Sprint Cup	Attempto Racing	9	0	0	0	0	0	NC
2017	Blancpain GT Series Sprint Cup – Silver	Attempto Racing	9	0	1	0	3	50	6th
2017	Intercontinental GT Challenge	Attempto Racing	1	0	0	0	0	0	NC
2017	Porsche Carrera Cup Germany	MRS GT-Racing	2	0	0	0	0	12	23rd
2018	IMSA SportsCar Championship – GTD	GRT Grasser Racing Team	1	0	0	0	0	18	57th
2018	Porsche GT3 Cup Challenge Benelux	GP Elite	12	1	0	1	6	161	**3rd**
2018–19	Porsche GT3 Challenge Middle East		3	0	0	0	0	28	21st
2019	Porsche Carrera Cup Benelux	Team GP Elite	12	7	7	3	11	225	**1st**
2019	Porsche Supercup	Team GP Elite	4	0	0	0	0	0	NC†
2020	Dutch Winter Endurance Series	Team GP Elite I	1	0	0	0	0	8	31st
2020	Porsche Supercup	Team GP Elite	8	0	0	0	1	77	6th
2020	24 Hours of Le Mans – LMGTE Am	Proton Competition	1	0	0	0	0	—N/a	12th
2021	Porsche Carrera Cup Germany	GP Elite	10	0	0	0	0	91	11th
2021	Porsche Supercup	Team GP Elite	8	0	0	0	0	56	9th
2022	24H GT Series Continents – 992	Team GP Elite	1	1	0	0	1	29	NC
2022	Porsche Supercup	Team GP Elite	8	0	0	0	0	26	15th
2022	Porsche Carrera Cup Germany	Team GP Elite	11	0	0	0	0	82	8th
2022–23	Middle East Trophy – GT3	Team GP-Elite	1	0	0	0	0	18	NC
2023	25 Hours VW Fun Cup	Milo Racing	1	0	0	0	0	—N/a	15th
2024	24H Series – GT3	GP Elite	1	1	0	0	1	40	19th

^{†} As Van Splunteren was a guest driver, he was ineligible to score points.

=== Complete European Le Mans Series results ===
Year	Entrant	Class	Chassis	Engine	1	2	3	4	5	Rank	Points
2014	Prospeed Competition	GTC	Porsche 997 GT3-R	Porsche M97/74 4.0 L Flat-6	SIL	IMO	RBR; 8	LEC; 9	EST; Ret	25th	6

=== Complete GT World Challenge Europe results ===
==== GT World Challenge Europe Sprint Cup ====
(key) (Races in bold indicate pole position) (Races in italics indicate fastest lap)

Year	Team	Car	Class	1	2	3	4	5	6	7	8	9	10	11	12	13	14	Pos.	Points
2015	Bentley Team HTP	Bentley Continental GT3	Silver	NOG; QR	NOG; CR	BRH; QR	BRH; CR	ZOL; QR	ZOL; CR	**MSC**; **QR**; 8	MSC; CR; 10	**ALG**; **QR**; 8	ALG; CR; Ret	MIS; QR; Ret	MIS; CR; DNS	**ZAN**; **QR**; 7	ZAN; CR; 6	4th	77
2016	Attempto Racing	Lamborghini Huracán GT3	Silver	MIS; QR; 21	MIS; CR; 20	BRH; QR; 24	BRH; CR; 13	NÜR; QR; 22	NÜR; CR; 21	HUN; QR; 21	HUN; CR; Ret							6th	60
2016	Attempto Racing	Lamborghini Huracán GT3	Pro									CAT; QR; 17	CAT; CR; 19					NC	0
2017	Attempto Racing	Lamborghini Huracán GT3	Silver	MIS; QR; Ret	MIS; CR; DNS	BRH; QR; Ret	BRH; CR; 26	ZOL; QR; 21	ZOL; CR; 21	HUN; QR; 28	HUN; CR; 20	**NÜR**; **QR**; 21	NÜR; CR; Ret					6th	50

==== GT World Challenge Europe Endurance Cup ====
(Races in bold indicate pole position) (Races in italics indicate fastest lap)

Year	Team	Car	Class	1	2	3	4	5	6	7	Pos.	Points
2015	Bentley Team HTP	Bentley Continental GT3	Pro-Am	MNZ	SIL	LEC	SPA; 6H; 19	SPA; 12H; 45	SPA; 24H; Ret	NÜR	27th	4
2016	Attempto Racing	Lamborghini Huracán GT3	Pro-Am	MNZ; 23	SIL; 44	LEC; 16	SPA; 6H; 15	SPA; 12H; 26	SPA; 24H; 52	NÜR; 49	16th	29
2017	Attempto Racing	Lamborghini Huracán GT3	Pro-Am	MNZ; 26	SIL; 30	LEC; Ret				CAT; 33	43th	4
2017	Attempto Racing	Lamborghini Huracán GT3	Pro				SPA; 6H; 50	SPA; 12H; 39	SPA; 24H; 35		NC	0

=== Complete IMSA SportsCar Championship results ===
(key) (Races in bold indicate pole position; races in italics indicate fastest lap)

Year	Entrant	Class	Make	Engine	1	2	3	4	5	6	7	8	9	10	11	Rank	Points
2018	GRT Grasser Racing Team	GTD	Lamborghini Huracán GT3	Lamborghini DGF 5.2 L V10	DAY; 13	SEB	MDO	BEL	WGL	MOS	LIM	ELK	VIR	LGA	PET	57th	18

=== Complete Porsche Supercup results ===
(key) (Races in bold indicate pole position) (Races in italics indicate fastest lap)

Year	Team	1	2	3	4	5	6	7	8	9	10	DC	Points
2019	Team GP Elite	CAT; 10	MON	RBR	SIL	HOC	HUN; 15	SPA; 15	MNZ; 12	MEX	MEX	NC†	0†
2020	Team GP Elite	RBR; 15	RBR; 9	HUN; 9	SIL; 2	SIL; 4	CAT; 5	SPA; 8	MNZ; 13			6th	77
2021	Team GP Elite	MON; 17	RBR; 5	RBR; Ret	HUN; 9	SPA; 5	ZND; 7	MNZ; 10	MNZ; 8			9th	56
2022	Team GP Elite	IMO; 10	MON; 20	SIL; 20	RBR; 7	LEC; 14	SPA; 13	ZND; 11	MNZ; 21			15th	26

=== Complete 24 Hours of Le Mans results ===
Year	Team	Co-Drivers	Car	Class	Laps	Pos.	Class Pos.
2020	(Germany) Proton Competition	(Italy) Michele Beretta (Austria) Horst Felbermayr Jr.	Porsche 911 RSR	LMGTE Am	330	38th	12th
