= Mateo Llarena =

Guatemalan-Italian racing driver (born 2004)

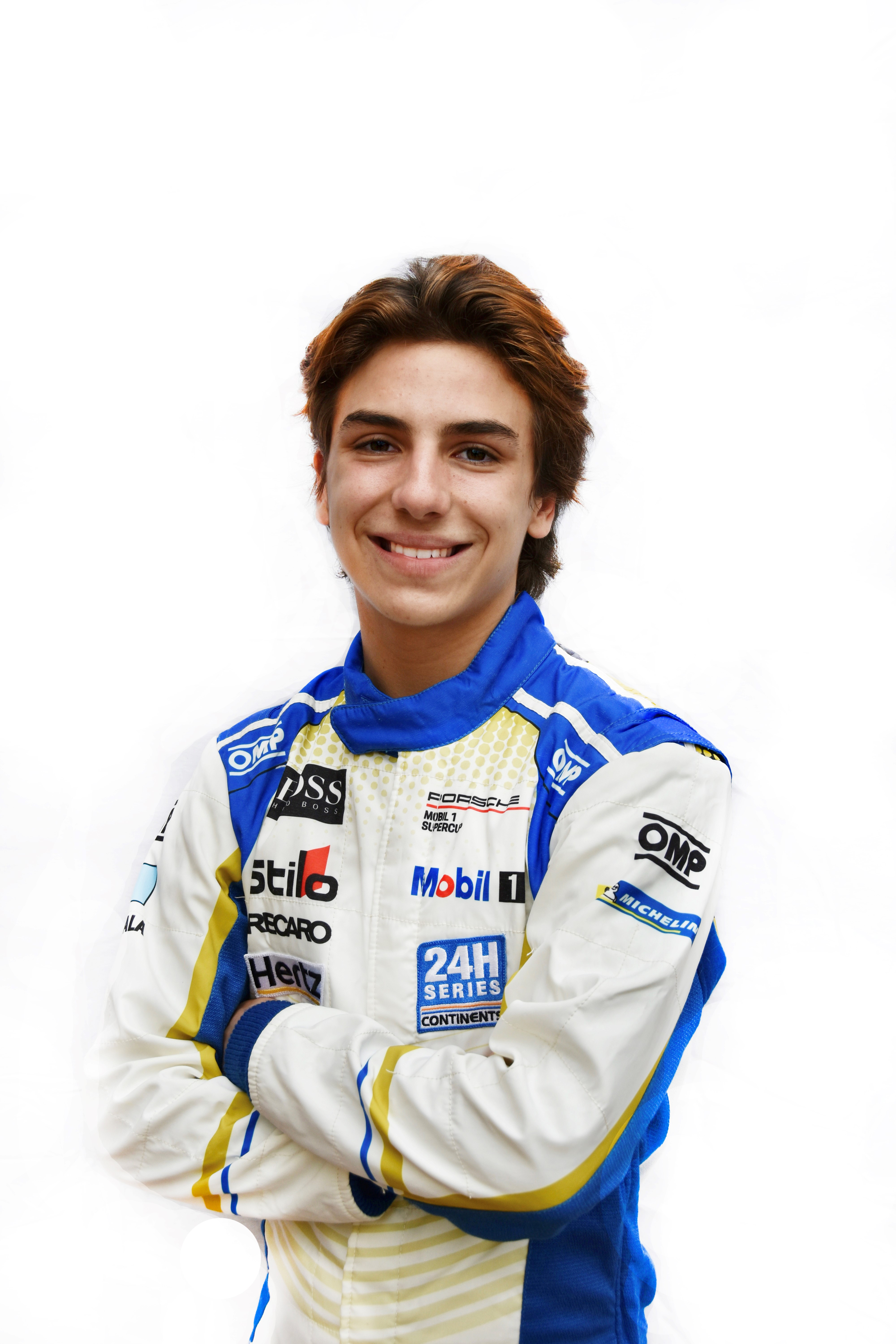
- Nationality: (Guatemala) Guatemalan (Italy) Italian
- Born: 26 February 2004 (age 22)

IMSA Sportscar Championship career
- Debut season: 2021
- Current team: NTE Sport SSR
- Categorisation: FIA Silver
- Car number: 42

Previous series
- 2021 2020 2018–2019: Italian GT Championship; Porsche Supercup; NACAM Formula 4 Championship

Mateo Llarena (born 26 February 2004) is a Guatemalan-Italian racing driver. He currently competes in the 2024 GT World Challenge Europe Endurance Cup.

== Career ==
=== Karting ===
Llarena began go karting at the age of four. He won two National Karting Championships and the FIA Americas Award before transitioning to open wheel racing. In 2014 and 2016, he was the champion in the Cadet category of the Guatemalan Karting Championship with the team Mazzotti Corse.

=== Formula 4 ===
In 2018, Llarena made his single-seater debut by competing in the 2018–19 NACAM Formula 4 Championship with Telcel RPL Racing. He finished the season in thirteenth position. His best race result was a seventh place at Autódromo Hermanos Rodríguez.

=== Sports car racing ===
At the age of fourteen, Llarena made his car racing debut by competing in some races of the Toyota Yaris Cup Guatemala. In 2019, he won the National Motorsport Championship at 15 years old, making him the youngest in history to win this tournament in Guatemala and Central America, earning his second FIA Americas Award.

The 2019 season also saw Llarena receive an invitation from Porsche AG to participate in the 2020 Porsche Supercup. He competed for the German-based team MRS GT-Racing, and finished seventeenth overall in the championship. At the age of 16, Llarena became the youngest ever driver to compete in the Porsche Supercup.

In 2021, Llarena made his debut in the IMSA SportsCar Championship He competed in the LMP3 class with Performance Tech Motorsports. At the 2021 WeatherTech 240 at The Glen, he became the youngest ever pole sitter in the IMSA SportsCar Championship. Since 2021, he has also been a part of the Lamborghini GT3 junior program after competing in the 2021 Italian GT Championship with Imperiale Racing.

In 2022, Llarena competed in the 24 Hours of Daytona with T3 Motorsport North America, driving a Lamborghini Huracán GT3 Evo in the GTD class. He then joined NTE Sport/SSR to compete in the 12 Hours of Sebring.

In 2023, Llarena joined Vincenzo Sospiri Racing to compete in the Italian GT Sprint Championship after competing in the championship with Imperiale Racing in the two previous years. Together with his teammate Baptiste Moulin he finished the season fifth in the GT3 Pro classification after scoring two podiums throughout the season.

In 2024, Llarena joined GRT Grasser Racing Team to compete in the GT World Challenge Europe Endurance Cup for the first time.

== Personal life ==
Llarena studied at Geneva Business School in Madrid. In 2023, Llarena received two Guinness World Records for becoming the youngest Porsche Supercup driver in 2020 and the youngest IMSA SportsCar Championship pole-sitter in 2021. In 2024, Llarena competed under an Italian racing license as he lived in Italy and had received Italian citizenship.

== Racing record ==
=== Career summary ===
Season	Series	Team	Races	Wins	Poles	F/Laps	Podiums	Points	Position
2018	Toyota Yaris Cup Guatemala - Am		9	2	1	2	3	77	10th
2018–19	NACAM Formula 4 Championship	Telcel RPL Racing	11	0	0	0	0	18	13th
2019	Campeonato Nacional Guatemala - GT4	Team Gulf Oil	9	5	3	9	8	77	**1st**
2019	Chase for the Trigon Trophy Super GT Series	TLM Racing	1	0	0	0	0	23	17th
2019	Porsche GT3 Cup Trophy Argentina		1	0	0	0	0	0	NC†
2020	Porsche Supercup	MRS GT-Racing	8	0	0	0	0	4	17th
2021	Italian GT Sprint Championship - GT3 Pro-Am	Imperiale Racing	7	0	0	0	1	44	6th
2021	IMSA SportsCar Championship - LMP3	Performance Tech Motorsports	5	0	2	0	0	838	13th
2022	IMSA SportsCar Championship - GTD	T3 Motorsport North America	1	0	0	0	0	397	44th
2022	IMSA SportsCar Championship - GTD	NTE Sport/SSR	1	0	0	0	0	397	44th
2022	Italian GT Endurance Championship - GT3 Pro	Imperiale Racing	3	0	1	0	3	?	?
2023	Italian GT Sprint Championship - GT3 Pro	Vincenzo Sospiri Racing	8	1	0	0	2	52	5th
2024	GT World Challenge Europe Endurance Cup	GRT Grasser Racing Team	5	0	0	0	0	0	NC
2024	ADAC GT Masters	GRT Grasser Racing Team	2	0	0	0	0	6	22nd
2024	24H Series - GT3	ARC Bratislava							
2025	GT World Challenge Europe Endurance Cup	Dinamic GT	1	0	0	0	0	0	NC

† As Llarena was a guest driver, he was ineligible to score points.

=== Complete Porsche Supercup results ===
(key) (Races in bold indicate pole position) (Races in italics indicate fastest lap)

Year	Team	1	2	3	4	5	6	7	8	Pos.	Points
2020	MRS GT-Racing	RBR; 19	RBR; 24	HUN; 15	SIL; 19	SIL; 18	CAT; 14	SPA; 19	MNZ; 24	18th	4

=== Complete IMSA SportsCar Championship results ===
(Races in bold indicate pole position) (Races in italics indicate fastest lap)

Year	Entrant	Class	Make	Engine	1	2	3	4	5	6	7	8	9	10	11	12	Rank	Points
2021	Performance Tech Motorsports	LMP3	Ligier JS P320	Nissan VK56DE 5.6 L V8	DAY; 6†	**SEB**; 7	MOH	WGL; 7	**WGL**; 5	ELK	PET						13th	838
2022	T3 Motorsport North America	GTD	Lamborghini Huracán GT3 Evo	Lamborghini 5.2 L V10	DAY; 8												44th	397
2022	NTE Sport/SSR	GTD	Lamborghini Huracán GT3 Evo	Lamborghini 5.2 L V10		SEB; 17	LBH	LGA	MDO	DET	WGL	MOS	LIM	ELK	VIR	PET	44th	397

=== Complete GT World Challenge Europe results ===
==== GT World Challenge Europe Endurance Cup ====
(Races in bold indicate pole position) (Races in italics indicate fastest lap)

Year	Team	Car	Class	1	2	3	4	5	6	7	Pos.	Points
2024	GRT Grasser Racing Team	Lamborghini Huracán GT3 Evo 2	Silver	LEC; 44	SPA; 6H; 50	SPA; 12H; 47	SPA; 24H; 37	NÜR; 31	**MNZ**; Ret	JED; Ret	20th	27
2025	Dinamic GT	Porsche 911 GT3 R (992)	Silver	LEC; 55	MNZ	SPA; 6H	SPA; 12H	SPA; 24H	NÜR	CAT	NC	0
