= 2022 Porsche Supercup =

30th Porsche Supercup season

The 2022 Porsche Mobil 1 Supercup was the 30th Porsche Supercup season, a GT3 production stock car racing series sanctioned by Porsche Motorsports GmbH in the world. It began on 24 April at the Autodromo Enzo e Dino Ferrari, Italy and ended on 11 September at the Autodromo Nazionale di Monza, Italy, after eight races, all of which were support events for the 2022 Formula One season. It marked the first time that the series visited Circuit Paul Ricard.

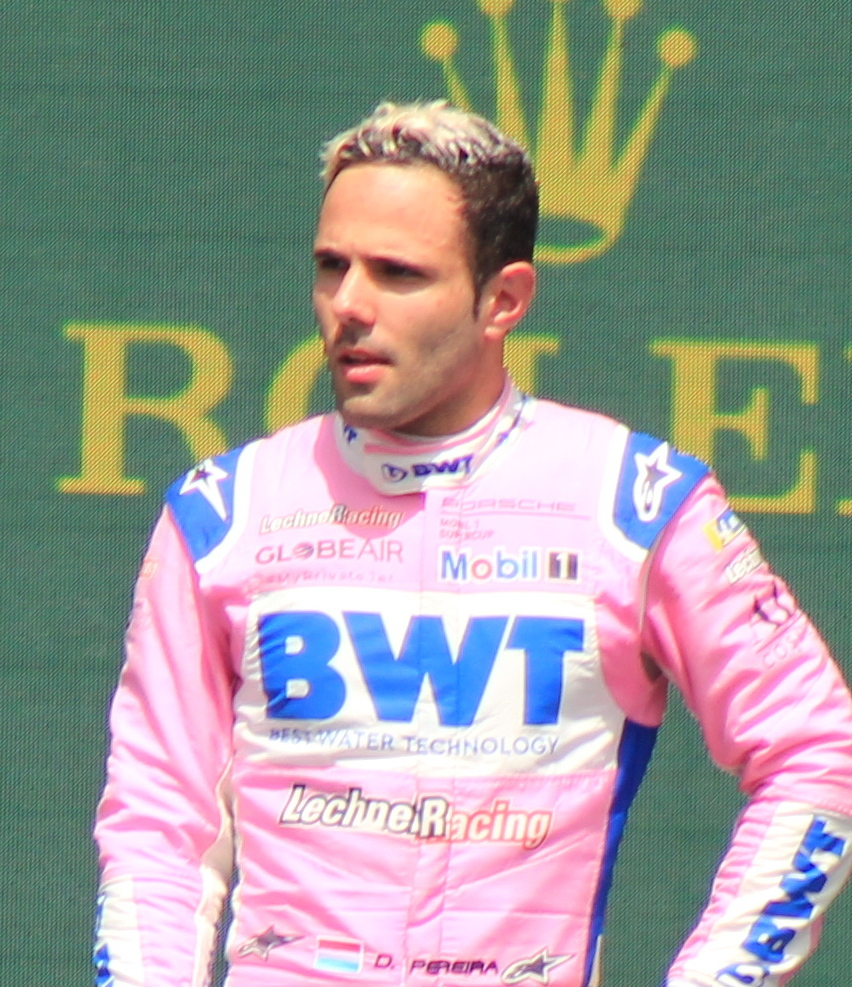
Dylan Pereira won his first Drivers' Championship title.

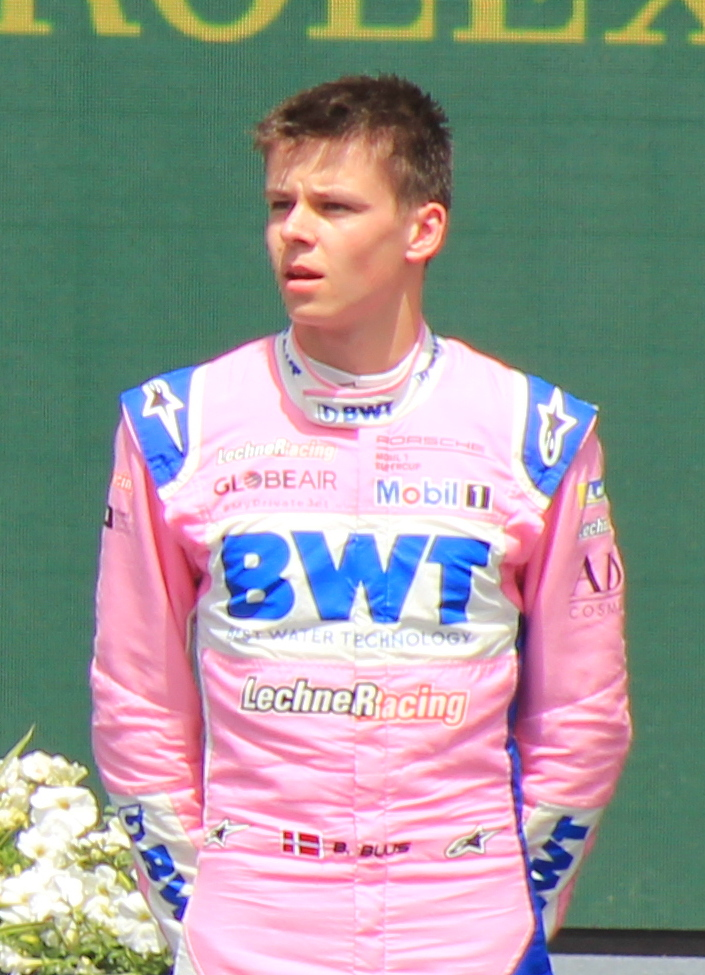
Bastian Buus won the Rookie Championship title.

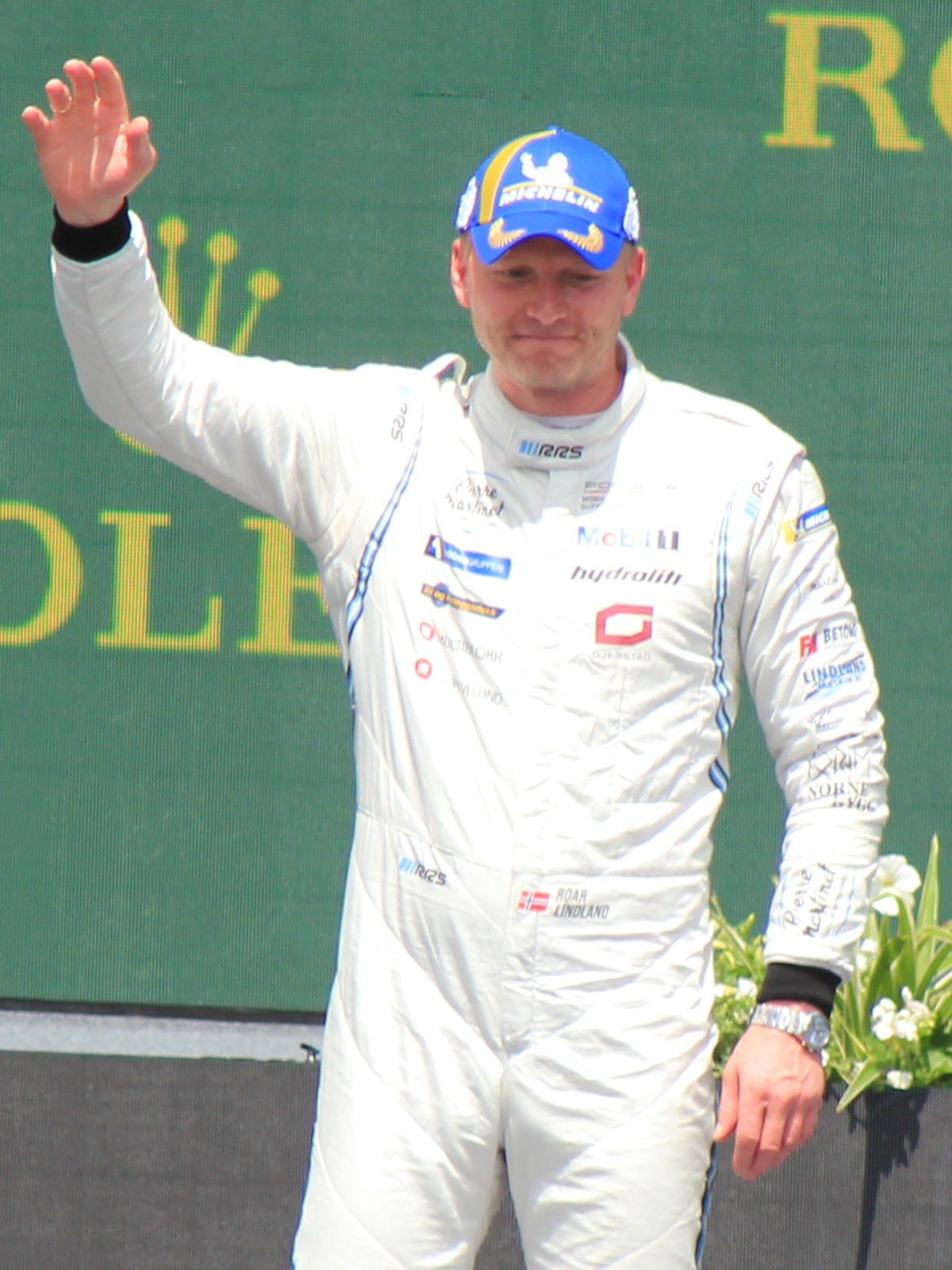
Roar Lindland won the Pro-Am Championship title.

== Teams and drivers ==
Team	No.	Drivers	Class	Rounds
(Germany) Huber Racing	1	(Netherlands) Morris Schuring	R	All
(Germany) Huber Racing	2	(Netherlands) Rudy van Buren		All
(Germany) Huber Racing	35	(Israel) Ariel Levi	G	3, 5–6
(Germany) SSR Huber Racing	3	(Germany) Laurin Heinrich		All
(Germany) SSR Huber Racing	4	(Germany) Michael Ammermüller		1–5
(Germany) SSR Huber Racing	4	(Germany) Sebastian Freymuth	G	6–8
(Austria) BWT Lechner Racing	5	(Luxembourg) Dylan Pereira		All
(Austria) BWT Lechner Racing	6	(United Kingdom) Harry King		All
(Austria) BWT Lechner Racing	7	(Denmark) Bastian Buus	R	All
(Switzerland) Fach Auto Tech	8	(Switzerland) Alexander Fach	R	All
(Switzerland) Fach Auto Tech	9	(United Kingdom) Lorcan Hanafin	R	All
(Switzerland) Fach Auto Tech	10	(Finland) Jukka Honkavuori		All
(France) CLRT	11	(France) Clément Mateu	PA	All
(France) CLRT	12	(France) Marvin Klein		All
(France) CLRT	13	(France) Evan Spenle	R	1
(France) CLRT	13	(Belgium) Benjamin Paque	G	2
(France) CLRT	13	(New Zealand) Jaxon Evans	G	4
(France) CLRT	13	(France) Florian Latorre	G	5
(France) CLRT	13	(United States) Howard Blank	G	6
(France) CLRT	13	(Netherlands) Michael Verhagen	G	7
(France) CLRT	13	(France) Ugo Gazil	G	8
(United Kingdom) Duckhams Yuasa Racing with CLRT	13	(United Kingdom) Adam Smalley	G	3
(Italy) Dinamic Motorsport	14	(Italy) Daniele Cazzaniga		All
(Italy) Dinamic Motorsport	15	(Austria) Philipp Sager	PA	All
(Italy) Dinamic Motorsport	16	(Italy) Simone Iaquinta		All
(Italy) Ombra Racing	17	(Netherlands) Loek Hartog	R	All
(Italy) Ombra Racing	18	(Italy) Gianmarco Quaresmini		All
(Italy) Ombra Racing	29	(Italy) Leonardo Caglioni	G	1, 5, 8
(France) Martinet by Alméras	19	(France) Dorian Boccolacci		All
(France) Martinet by Alméras	20	(Netherlands) Jaap van Lagen		All
(France) Martinet by Alméras	21	(Norway) Roar Lindland	PA	All
(France) Martinet by Alméras	22	(France) Stéphane Denoual	PA	All
(France) Martinet by Alméras	23	(United Kingdom) Aaron Mason	PA	All
(France) Martinet by Alméras	38	(Australia) Aaron Love	G	3, 5
(France) Martinet by Alméras	39	(Australia) Stephen Grove	G	5
(Netherlands) Team GP Elite	24	(Netherlands) Max van Splunteren		All
(Netherlands) Team GP Elite	25	(Netherlands) Larry ten Voorde		All
(Netherlands) Team GP Elite	26	(Netherlands) Jesse van Kuijk		All
(Netherlands) GP Elite	27	(Netherlands) Daan van Kuijk		All
(Netherlands) GP Elite	28	(Netherlands) Lucas Groeneveld		All
(Netherlands) GP Elite	33	(Netherlands) Huub van Eijndhoven	G	6–7
(Sweden) Fragus Motorsport	30	(Sweden) Pontus Fredricsson	G	1, 4, 7
(Sweden) Fragus Motorsport	31	(Sweden) Hampus Ericsson	G	1, 4
(Sweden) Fragus Motorsport	31	(Sweden) Lukas Sundahl	G	7
(Sweden) Fragus Motorsport	32	(Sweden) Edvin Hellsten	G	1, 7
(Canada) Kelly-Moss Road and Race	36	(Belgium) Ghislain Cordeel	G	3
(Canada) Kelly-Moss Road and Race	37	(United States) Riley Dickinson	G	3
(Germany) ID Racing	40	(Brazil) Georgios Frangulis	G	4
(Germany) ID Racing	40	(Netherlands) Willem Meijer	G	6
(Germany) ID Racing	41	(Netherlands) Michael Verhagen	G	4, 6
(San Marino) Tsunami R.T.	42	(Italy) Giammarco Levorato	G	8
(San Marino) Tsunami R.T.	43	(Italy) Andrea Fontana	G	8
(San Marino) Tsunami R.T.	44	(Italy) Johannes Zelger	G	8
(Germany) Porsche Motorsport	911	(Spain) Jorge Lorenzo	G	1

Icon	Class
PA	Pro-Am Cup
R	Rookie
G	Guest

== Race calendar and results ==
Round	Circuit	Date	Pole position	Fastest lap	Winning driver	Winning team
1	(Italy) Autodromo Enzo e Dino Ferrari, Imola	22–24 April	(Luxembourg) Dylan Pereira	(France) Marvin Klein	(Luxembourg) Dylan Pereira	(Austria) BWT Lechner Racing
2	Circuit de Monaco, Monte Carlo	27–29 May	(Netherlands) Larry ten Voorde	(Netherlands) Larry ten Voorde	(Netherlands) Larry ten Voorde	(Netherlands) Team GP Elite
3	(United Kingdom) Silverstone Circuit, Silverstone	1–3 July	(Netherlands) Larry ten Voorde	(Germany) Laurin Heinrich	(Germany) Laurin Heinrich	(Germany) SSR Huber Racing
4	(Austria) Red Bull Ring, Spielberg	8–10 July	(Luxembourg) Dylan Pereira	(Luxembourg) Dylan Pereira	(Luxembourg) Dylan Pereira	(Austria) BWT Lechner Racing
5	(France) Circuit Paul Ricard, Le Castellet	22–24 July	(Denmark) Bastian Buus	(United Kingdom) Harry King	(Denmark) Bastian Buus	(Austria) BWT Lechner Racing
6	(Belgium) Circuit de Spa-Francorchamps, Stavelot	26–28 August	(Luxembourg) Dylan Pereira	(Luxembourg) Dylan Pereira	(Luxembourg) Dylan Pereira	(Austria) BWT Lechner Racing
7	(Netherlands) Circuit Zandvoort, Zandvoort	2–4 September	(France) Marvin Klein (Note: Dylan Pereira set the fastest time in qualifying, but received a three-place grid penalty for causing a collision. Marvin Klein was promoted to pole position in his place.)	(France) Marvin Klein	(France) Marvin Klein	(France) CLRT
8	(Italy) Autodromo Nazionale di Monza, Monza	9–11 September	(France) Marvin Klein (Note: Harry King set the fastest time in qualifying, but received a three-place grid penalty. Marvin Klein was promoted to pole position in his place.)	(United Kingdom) Harry King	(Denmark) Bastian Buus	(Austria) BWT Lechner Racing

== Championship standings ==
=== Scoring system ===
Points were awarded to the top fifteen classified drivers in every race, using the following system:

Position	**1st**	**2nd**	**3rd**	**4th**	**5th**	**6th**	**7th**	**8th**	**9th**	**10th**	**11th**	**12th**	**13th**	**14th**	**15th**	**Ref**
Points	25	20	17	14	12	10	9	8	7	6	5	4	3	2	1	

In order for full points to be awarded, the race winner must complete at least 50% of the scheduled race distance. Half points are awarded if the race winner completes less than 50% of the race distance. In the event of a tie at the conclusion of the championship, a count-back system is used as a tie-breaker, with a driver's/constructor's best result used to decide the standings.

Guest drivers are ineligible to score points. If a guest driver finishes in first position, the second-placed finisher will receive 25 points. The same goes for every other points scoring position. So if three guest drivers end up placed fourth, fifth and sixth, the seventh-placed finisher will receive fourteen points and so forth - until the eighteenth-placed finisher receives the final point.

=== Drivers' Championship ===
Pos.	Driver	IMO (Italy)	MON (Monaco)	GBR (United Kingdom)	AUT (Austria)	LEC (France)	SPA (Belgium)	ZND (Netherlands)	MNZ (Italy)	Points
1	(Luxembourg) Dylan Pereira	**1**	4	4	**1**	4	**1**	2	5	149
2	(Netherlands) Larry ten Voorde	2	**1**	**2**	29	3	2	3	2	139
3	(Germany) Laurin Heinrich	4	3	1	2	5	3	5	10	123
4	(Denmark) Bastian Buus	5	9	5	3	**1**	6	4	1	122
5	(United Kingdom) Harry King	3	5	3	4	2	5	Ret	3	109
6	(France) Marvin Klein	15	7	11	28	6	4	**1**	**4**	78
7	(France) Dorian Boccolacci	6	2	Ret	Ret	12	11	7	6	59
8	(Netherlands) Loek Hartog	9	15	10	13	Ret	9	6	8	43
9	(United Kingdom) Lorcan Hanafin	8	14	6	10	13	7	19	19	40
10	(Italy) Simone Iaquinta	24	8	21	5	9	8	12	20	39
11	(Netherlands) Jaap van Lagen	13	10	14	6	8	20	Ret	11	35
12	(Netherlands) Rudy van Buren	7	11	8	12	18	19	10	15	35
13	(Netherlands) Morris Schuring	14	13	13	9	7	16	9	Ret	33
14	(Finland) Jukka Honkavuori	11	16	7	17	20	10	8	12	33
15	(Netherlands) Max van Splunteren	10	20	20	7	14	13	11	21	26
16	(Germany) Michael Ammermüller	12	6	16	14	21				19
17	(Italy) Gianmarco Quaresmini	23	12	22	20	17	Ret	15	7	14
18	(Netherlands) Jesse van Kuijk	18	18	19	11	10	15	17	16	14
19	(Netherlands) Lucas Groeneveld	19	Ret	18	Ret	15	12	13	13	13
20	(Switzerland) Alexander Fach	16	17	Ret	15	16	14	27	9	12
21	(Netherlands) Daan van Kuijk	21	21	9	21	22	18	14	Ret	9
22	(Italy) Daniele Cazzaniga	26	23	28	19	24	28	21	17	0
23	(France) Evan Spenle	17								0
24	(Norway) Roar Lindland	27	19	25	23	26	24	26	28	0
25	(United Kingdom) Aaron Mason	31	DNQ	24	26	Ret	21	22	24	0
26	(France) Clément Mateu	28	25	26	24	27	22	28	25	0
27	(Austria) Philipp Sager	29	24	27	22	29	26	29	26	0
28	(France) Stéphane Denoual	32	Ret	29	25	28	29	25	Ret	0
Guest drivers ineligible for points
-	(New Zealand) Jaxon Evans				8					-
-	(France) Florian Latorre					11				-
-	(United Kingdom) Adam Smalley			12						-
-	(Italy) Leonardo Caglioni	Ret				25			14	-
-	(United States) Riley Dickinson			15						-
-	(Sweden) Pontus Fredricsson	22			16			20		-
-	(Netherlands) Huub van Eijndhoven						27	16		-
-	(Belgium) Ghislain Cordeel			17						-
-	(Netherlands) Willem Meijer						17			-
-	(Sweden) Hampus Ericsson	20			18					-
-	(Sweden) Lukas Sundahl							18		-
-	(Italy) Andrea Fontana								18	-
-	(Australia) Aaron Love			30		19				-
-	(Germany) Sebastian Freymuth						23	23	22	-
-	(Belgium) Benjamin Paque		22							-
-	(Israel) Ariel Levi			23		23	Ret			-
-	(France) Ugo Gazil								23	-
-	(Sweden) Edvin Hellsten	25						24		-
-	(Netherlands) Michael Verhagen				Ret		25	Ret		-
-	(Brazil) Georgios Frangulis				27					-
-	(Italy) Johannes Zelger								27	-
-	(Spain) Jorge Lorenzo	30								-
-	(Australia) Stephen Grove					30				-
-	(Italy) Giammarco Levorato								Ret	-
-	(United States) Howard Blank						DNQ			-
Pos.	Driver	IMO (Italy)	MON (Monaco)	GBR (United Kingdom)	AUT (Austria)	LEC (France)	SPA (Belgium)	ZND (Netherlands)	MNZ (Italy)	Points

Colour	Result
Gold	Winner
Silver	Second place
Bronze	Third place
Green	Points classification
Blue	Non-points classification
Blue	Non-classified finish (NC)
Purple	Retired, not classified (Ret)
Red	Did not qualify (DNQ)
Red	Did not pre-qualify (DNPQ)
Black	Disqualified (DSQ)
White	Did not start (DNS)
White	Withdrew (WD)
White	Race cancelled (C)
Blank	Did not practice (DNP)
Blank	Did not arrive (DNA)
Blank	Excluded (EX)

**Bold** – Pole
Italics – Fastest Lap

=== Rookie Championship ===
Pos.	Driver	IMO (Italy)	MON (Monaco)	GBR (United Kingdom)	AUT (Austria)	LEC (France)	SPA (Belgium)	ZND (Netherlands)	MNZ (Italy)	Points
1	(Denmark) Bastian Buus	5	9	5	3	**1**	6	5	1	122
2	(Netherlands) Loek Hartog	9	15	10	13	Ret	9	7	8	43
3	(United Kingdom) Lorcan Hanafin	8	14	6	10	13	7	19	19	40
4	(Netherlands) Morris Schuring	14	13	13	9	7	16	2	Ret	33
5	(Switzerland) Alexander Fach	16	17	Ret	15	16	14	27	9	12
6	(France) Evan Spenle	17								0
Pos.	Driver	IMO (Italy)	MON (Monaco)	GBR (United Kingdom)	AUT (Austria)	LEC (France)	SPA (Belgium)	ZND (Netherlands)	MNZ (Italy)	Points

=== Pro-Am Championship ===
Pos.	Driver	IMO (Italy)	MON (Monaco)	GBR (United Kingdom)	AUT (Austria)	LEC (France)	SPA (Belgium)	ZND (Netherlands)	MNZ (Italy)	Points
1	(Norway) Roar Lindland	27	19	25	23	26	23	26	28	163
2	(France) Clément Mateu	28	25	26	24	27	22	28	25	145
3	(Austria) Philipp Sager	29	24	27	22	29	27	29	26	133
4	(United Kingdom) Aaron Mason	31	DNQ	24	26	Ret	21	22	24	126
5	(France) Stéphane Denoual	32	Ret	29	25	28	29	25	Ret	87
Pos.	Driver	IMO (Italy)	MON (Monaco)	GBR (United Kingdom)	AUT (Austria)	LEC (France)	SPA (Belgium)	ZND (Netherlands)	MNZ (Italy)	Points

=== Teams' Championship ===
Pos.	Team	Points
1	(Austria) BWT Lechner Racing	288
2	(Netherlands) Team GP Elite	164
3	(Germany) SSR Huber Racing	140
4	(France) CLRT	95
5	(France) Martinet by Alméras	92
6	(Germany) Huber Racing	65
7	(Italy) Ombra Racing	56
8	(Switzerland) Fach Auto Racing	47
9	(Italy) Dinamic Motorsport	39
10	(Netherlands) GP Elite	20
11	(France) Pierre Martinet by Alméras	0
