= Julien Andlauer =

French racing driver

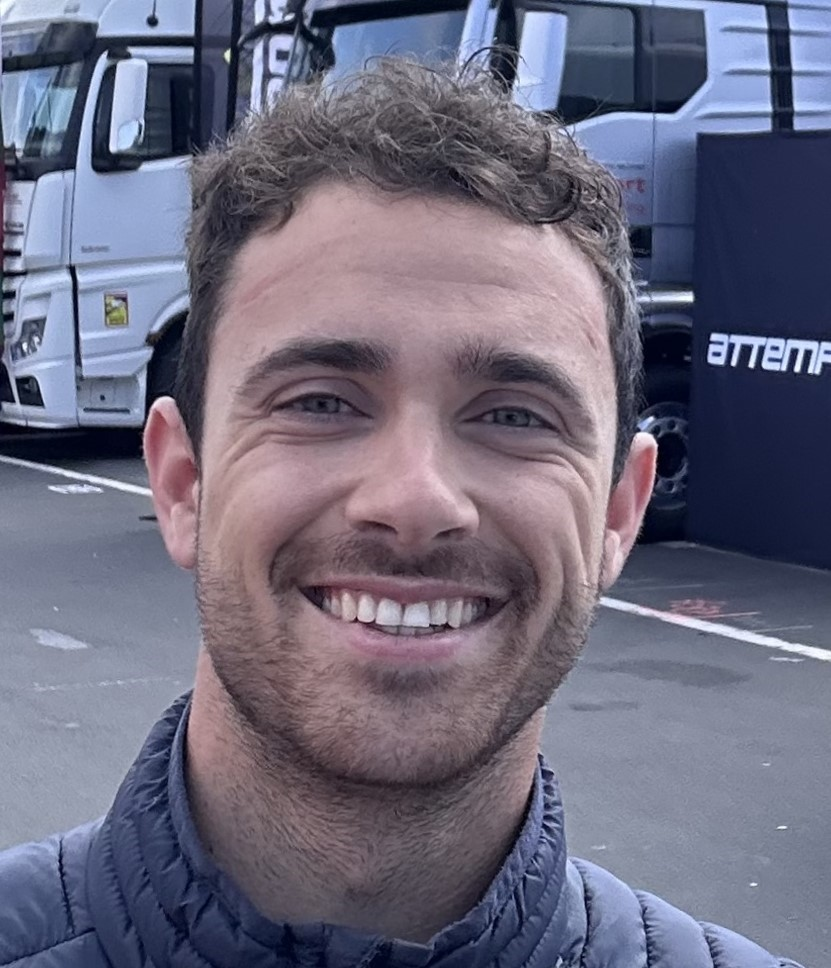
- Andlauer in 2024
- Nationality: (France) French
- Born: 5 July 1999 (age 27) Lyon, France

FIA WEC career
- Categorisation: FIA Silver (until 2018); FIA Gold (2019–2026); FIA Platinum (2027–)
- Years active: 2018–19, 2021–
- Teams: Porsche Penske Motorsport
- Co-driver: Michael Christensen; Mathieu Jaminet
- Starts: 20
- Wins: 5
- Poles: 3
- Fastest laps: 0
- Best finish: 4th in 2023

Previous series
- 2020–21 2018–19 2017–19 2016–18 2015: Le Mans Cup - GT3; Porsche Carrera Cup Germany; Porsche Supercup; Porsche Carrera Cup France; French F4 Championship

Championship titles
- 2017 2019: Porsche Carrera Cup France; Porsche Carrera Cup Germany

Awards
- 2024: WEC Revelation of the Year

Julien Andlauer (born 5 July 1999 in Lyon) is a French racing driver. He is a Porsche factory driver, and competes in the IMSA SportsCar Championship for Porsche Penske Motorsport.

A dual Porsche Carrera Cup champion in his youth, Andlauer developed into one of the leading LMGTE Am drivers, and was a 24 Hours of Le Mans class winner on debut in 2018. He made his LMDh debut for Proton in 2024, and notably took the lead of the 6 Hours of Spa with four overtakes at Eau Rouge. Andlauer was promoted to the Porsche factory team in 2025, and won the 24 Hours of Daytona and 12 Hours of Sebring overall in 2026.

== Early career ==
Following a career in karting and a lone season in the French F4 Championship in 2015 where he scored two podiums and finished eighth overall, Andlauer moved to the Porsche Carrera Cup France. After finishing fifth in the standings with Saintéloc Racing, he would score seven wins in 2017 to win the French title as part of the Martinet by Alméras outfit. Andlauer became a Porsche junior driver near the end of the year, having impressed the German manufacturer in a two-day talent shootout at the Lausitzring.

== Porsche junior ==
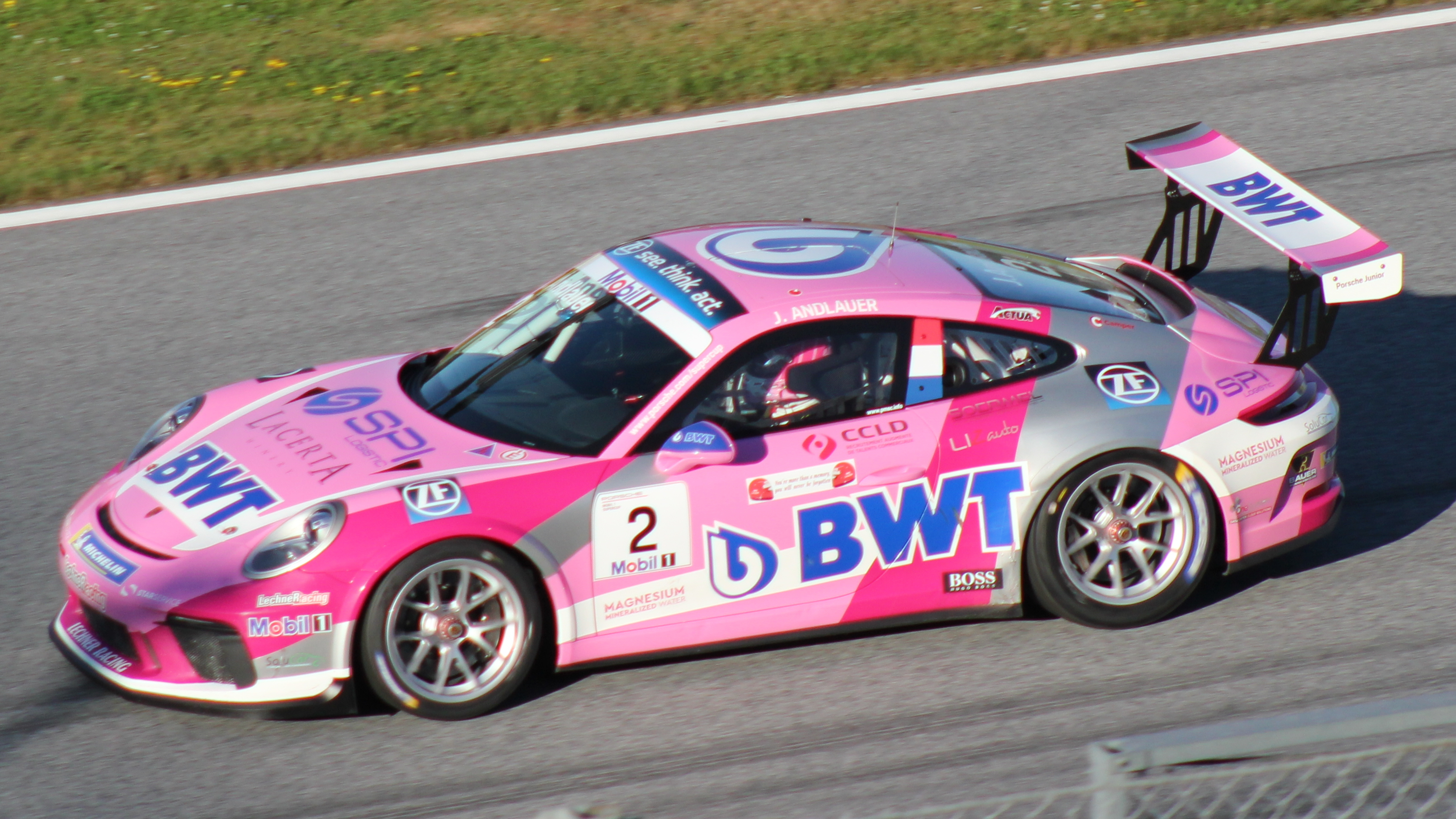
Andlauer racing in Porsche Supercup in 2019.

As part of his selection in the shootout, Andlauer would progress to the Porsche Supercup in 2018. Remaining with Martinet by Alméras, he would score both wins at the season-ending round in Mexico City and ended up fourth in the standings.

During 2018, Andlauer would also make his debut in the FIA World Endurance Championship, competing in the LMGTE Am category for Dempsey-Proton Racing alongside Matt Campbell and team owner Christian Ried. Having started out with a fourth place in Spa, the trio would end up winning their class at the 2018 24 Hours of Le Mans, making Andlauer the youngest driver to triumph in the race's history at the age of 18. The team added another win at Silverstone, but a disqualification at the subsequent round in Fuji for data manipulation was compounded by the team losing all points from the opening four races of the WEC season. Two back-to-back victories at Shanghai and Sebring followed, before Andlauer missed the 2019 Spa event. He returned for the final round - the 2019 24 Hours of Le Mans - in which the team finished fourth. As a result of his performances, having helped Proton to win four races and finish second in the teams' standings, Andlauer was promoted to gold ranking by the FIA from 2019 onwards.

In addition, Andlauer returned to the Porsche Supercup in 2019, whilst also competing in the Porsche Carrera Cup Germany. Driving for BWT Lechner Racing in both series, he would win the German championship, having taken five victories, and finished third in the Supercup with two wins.

At the conclusion of the year, Andlauer was promoted from junior driver to young professional status by Porsche.

== Porsche young professional ==
2020 saw Andlauer competing in the Michelin Le Mans Cup, driving a Porsche 911 GT3 R for Pzoberer Zürichsee by TFT alongside gentleman driver Nicolas Leutwiler. The pair finished third in the standings, winning races in Le Castellet and Monza.

After finishing second in the Asian Le Mans Series at the beginning of 2021, Andlauer would remain in the MLMC with Pzoberer Zürichsee and Leutwiler, whilst also returning to the GTE Am class of the WEC with Dempsey-Proton Racing for four rounds. These included another appearance at Le Mans, where the Frenchman would score pole in his class. Andlauer helped Leutwiler towards two victories in the Le Mans Cup, which included a win at the Road to Le Mans event.

In a scattered 2022 campaign, Andlauer would compete in a variety of individual events, including the 24 Hours of Daytona and 12 Hours of Sebring in the IMSA SportsCar Championship, the 24 Hours of Spa and the 24 Hours of Nürburgring, as well as racing in numerous NLS Series races. He also took part at the 24 Hours of Le Mans, setting the fastest lap of the race and finishing second with WeatherTech Racing.

For 2023, the final year of LMGTE regulations, Andlauer would return to Proton Competition's WEC operations on a full-time basis, partnering Christian Ried and Mikkel O. Pedersen, whilst also driving for the team in the European Le Mans Series with Ried and Giammarco Levorato. The WEC season began promisingly with a second place at Sebring, however the team would struggle throughout the subsequent rounds and retired from Le Mans after an accident caused by an LMP2 car. They bounced back with their season highlight at Monza, as Andlauer and his teammates put together a consistent drive to win the race, a result which eventually helped the No. 77 crew to finish fourth in the standings. In the ELMS, a lap one crash at Barcelona cost the team dearly, as they missed out on the championship by 20 points to the sister car despite taking three podiums, which included wins at Le Castellet and the Algarve.

During the post-season winter, Andlauer made his prototype debut in the LMP2 class of the AsLMS, driving alongside René Binder and Giorgio Roda at Proton. He quickly impressed, helping the team towards a podium in Sepang and missing out narrowly on victory at Dubai to category stalwart Louis Delétraz. At the season finale in Abu Dhabi, Andlauer set the fastest lap and finished second, which took the team into a runner-up spot in the standings.

Following his maiden prototype outing, Porsche would elevate Andlauer into the top class of the WEC, as he would be contesting the 2024 season as part of Proton's Hypercar lineup together with Harry Tincknell and Neel Jani. Filling up his schedule was a campaign in the ELMS, where he drove in the LMGT3 category alongside Matteo Cressoni and gentleman driver Claudio Schiavoni. At the 6 Hours of Spa, Andlauer made headlines for performing four overtakes at the Eau Rouge/Raidillon complex and setting the fastest race lap, leading Proton towards a fifth-place finish.

== Personal life ==
As of 2024, Andlauer resides in Dubai.

== Racing record ==
=== Career summary ===
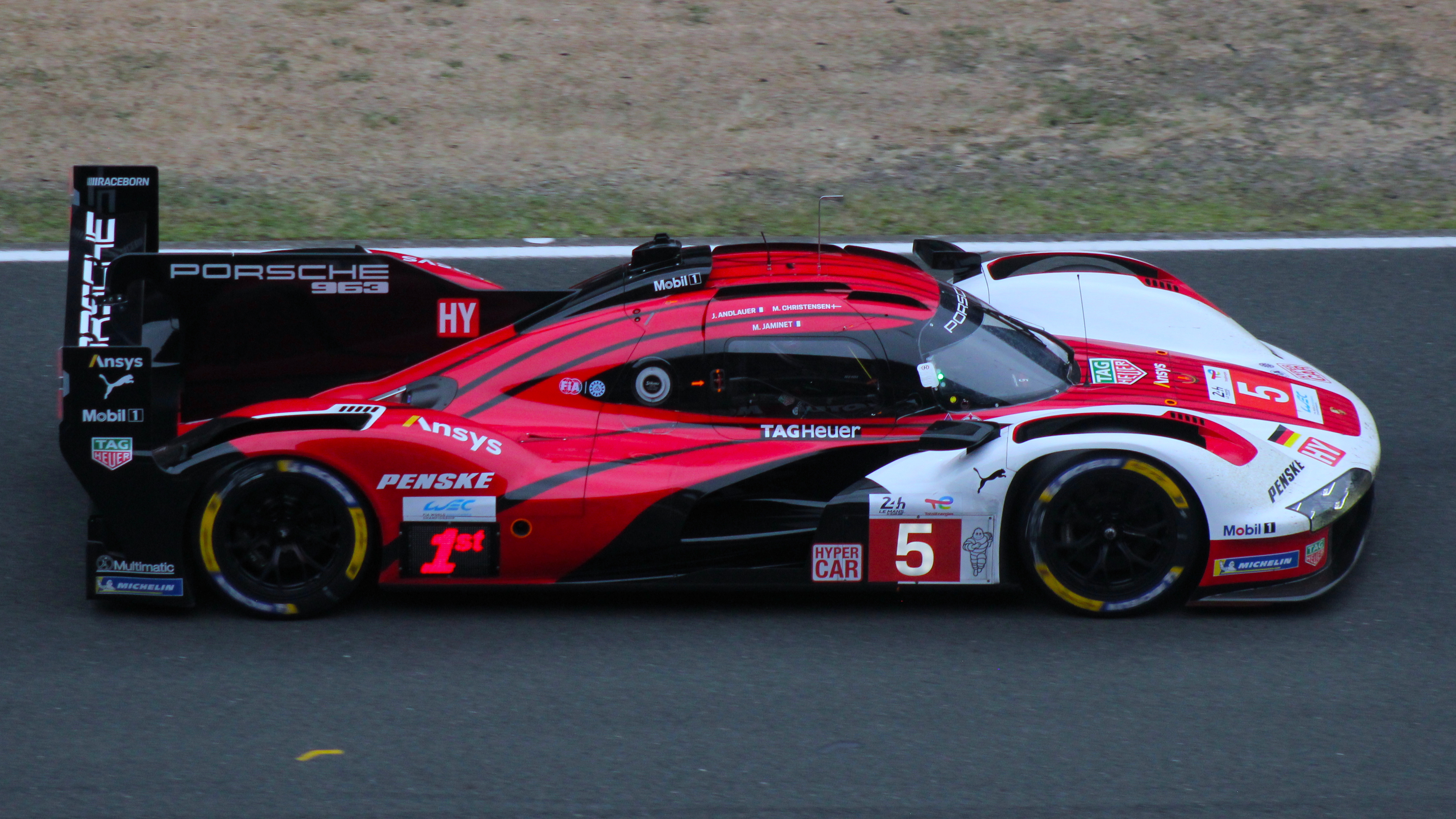
Andlauer's No. 5 car at the 2025 24 Hours of Le Mans

Season	Series	Team	Races	Wins	Poles	F/Laps	Podiums	Points	Position
2015	French F4 Championship	Auto Sport Academy	21	0	0	2	2	116	8th
2015	Porsche Carrera Cup Italia	Saintéloc Racing	1	0	0	0	0	0	NC†
2016	Porsche Carrera Cup France	Saintéloc Racing	12	0	0	0	4	111	5th
2017	Porsche Carrera Cup France	Martinet by Alméras	11	7	1	6	8	187	**1st**
2017	Porsche Supercup	Martinet by Alméras	2	0	0	0	0	12	22nd
2018	Porsche Carrera Cup France	Martinet by Alméras	10	5	7	6	9	192	**2nd**
2018	Porsche Carrera Cup Germany	Martinet by Alméras	2	0	0	0	0	0	NC†
2018	Porsche GT3 Cup Challenge Benelux	Martinet by Alméras	2	0	1	0	2	0	NC†
2018	Porsche Supercup	Martinet by Alméras	10	2	0	0	4	127	4th
2018	24H GT Series - 911	Fach Auto Tech	1	1	0	0	1	0	NC†
2018	24 Hours of Le Mans - LMGTE Am	Dempsey-Proton Racing	1	1	1	0	1	N/A	**1st**
2018–19	FIA World Endurance Championship - LMGTE Am	Dempsey-Proton Racing	7	4	2	0	5	85	6th
2018–19	Porsche GT3 Cup Challenge Middle East		2	0	0	0	0	13	27th
2019	Porsche Carrera Cup Germany	BWT Lechner Racing	16	5	2	5	9	262.5	**1st**
2019	Porsche Supercup	BWT Lechner Racing	10	2	3	3	4	118	**3rd**
2019	24 Hours of Le Mans - LMGTE Am	Dempsey-Proton Racing	1	0	1	0	0	N/A	4th
2020	ADAC GT Masters	Joos Sportwagentechnik	2	0	0	0	0	0	NC†
2020	GT World Challenge Europe Endurance Cup	Rowe Racing	2	0	0	0	0	8	18th
2020	Le Mans Cup - GT3	Pzoberer Zürichsee by TFT	6	2	0	3	3	70	4th
2020	Nürburgring Endurance Series - SP9 Pro	Manthey Racing	3	0	0	0	0	14.67	34th
2020	24H GT Series - GT3	GPX Racing	1	0	0	0	0	0	NC†
2020	24 Hours of Le Mans - LMGTE Am	Dempsey-Proton Racing	1	0	0	0	0	N/A	10th
2021	FIA World Endurance Championship - LMGTE Am	Dempsey-Proton Racing	4	0	1	0	0	12.5	20th
2021	24 Hours of Le Mans - LMGTE Am	Dempsey-Proton Racing	1	0	1	0	0	N/A	13th
2021	Asian Le Mans Series - GT	GPX Racing	4	2	0	1	2	62.5	**2nd**
2021	24H GT Series - GT3	GPX Racing	1	1	0	0	1	0	NC†
2021	Le Mans Cup - GT3	Pzoberer Zürichsee by TFT	6	2	1	3	5	92	**3rd**
2021	Historic Grand Prix of Monaco - Series F	March Engineering	1	0	0	0	1	N/A	**2nd**
2021	Nürburgring Endurance Series - SP9 Pro	Frikadelli Racing Team	1	0	1	0	1	0	NC†
2021	24 Hours of Nürburgring - SP9	Rutronik Racing	1	0	0	0	0	N/A	DNF
2022	IMSA SportsCar Championship - GTD Pro	WeatherTech Racing	2	0	0	0	0	524	21st
2022	FIA World Endurance Championship - LMGTE Am	Dempsey-Proton Racing	1	0	0	0	0	2	26th
2022	GT World Challenge Europe Endurance Cup	Toksport WRT	1	0	0	0	0	0	NC
2022	Intercontinental GT Challenge	Toksport WRT	1	0	0	0	0	0	NC
2022	Nürburgring Endurance Series - SP9 Pro	Toksport WRT	1	0	0	0	0	0	NC†
2022	24 Hours of Nürburgring - SP9	Toksport WRT	1	0	0	0	0	N/A	DNF
2022	Nürburgring Endurance Series - SPX	Manthey Racing	1	1	0	1	1	0	NC†
2022	Nürburgring Endurance Series - SPX	Falken Motorsports	1	0	0	0	0	0	NC†
2022	Nürburgring Endurance Series - SPX	Dinamic Motorsport	1	1	1	1	1	0	NC†
2022	24 Hours of Le Mans - LMGTE Am	WeatherTech Racing	1	0	0	1	1	N/A	**2nd**
2023	FIA World Endurance Championship - LMGTE Am	Dempsey-Proton Racing	7	1	0	0	2	80	4th
2023	24 Hours of Le Mans - LMGTE Am	Dempsey-Proton Racing	1	0	0	0	0	N/A	DNF
2023	European Le Mans Series - GTE	Proton Competition	6	2	0	2	3	85	**2nd**
2023	GT World Challenge Europe Endurance Cup	Manthey EMA	1	0	0	0	0	20	13th
2023	Intercontinental GT Challenge	Manthey EMA	1	0	0	0	1	15	21st
2023	IMSA SportsCar Championship - GTD	Kelly-Moss with Riley	6	0	1	2	3	1667	18th
2023	24H GT Series - GT3	IMSA LS Group Performance	1	1	0	0	1	0	NC†
2023	Nürburgring Endurance Series - SP9 Pro	Rutronik Racing	2	0	0	0	2	0	NC†
2023	24 Hours of Nürburgring - SP9	Rutronik Racing	1	0	0	0	0	N/A	5th
2023–24	Asian Le Mans Series - LMP2	Proton Competition	5	0	0	1	3	71	**2nd**
2024	FIA World Endurance Championship - Hypercar	Proton Competition	8	0	0	1	0	13	24th
2024	European Le Mans Series - LMGT3	Proton Competition	6	0	0	2	1	39	13th
2024	GT World Challenge Europe Endurance Cup	Rutronik Racing	5	0	1	0	0	13	17th
2024	IMSA SportsCar Championship - GTD	Kelly-Moss with Riley	1	0	0	0	0	208	63rd
2024	IMSA SportsCar Championship - GTP	Proton Competition Mustang Sampling	1	0	0	0	0	254	31st
2024	IMSA SportsCar Championship - GTD Pro	AO Racing	2	0	0	0	0	536	28th
2024	Nürburgring Langstrecken-Serie - SP9	Falken Motorsports	2	0	0	0	1	*	*
2024	Intercontinental GT Challenge	Falken Motorsports	2	0	0	0	0	22	11th
2024	24 Hours of Nürburgring - SP9	Falken Motorsports	1	0	0	0	0	N/A	6th
2024–25	Asian Le Mans Series - LMP2	Pure Rxcing	4	0	0	1	0	18	13th
2025	FIA World Endurance Championship - Hypercar	Porsche Penske Motorsport	8	0	0	0	1	46	11th
2025	IMSA SportsCar Championship - GTP	Proton Competition	1	0	0	0	0	255	37th
2025	IMSA SportsCar Championship - GTP	Porsche Penske Motorsport	0	0	0	0	0	255	37th
2025	Nürburgring Langstrecken-Serie - SP9	Falken Motorsports	4	1	1	1	2	0	NC†
2025	24 Hours of Nürburgring - SP9	Falken Motorsports	1	0	0	0	0	N/A	DNF
2026	IMSA SportsCar Championship - GTP	Porsche Penske Motorsport	9	2	0	1	2	2638	7th
2026	Nürburgring Langstrecken-Serie - SP9	Dunlop Motorsports							
2026	24 Hours of Nürburgring - SP9	Dunlop Motorsports	1	0	0	0	0	N/A	DNF
2026	Intercontinental GT Challenge	Dunlop Motorsports	1	0	0	0	0	25	15th
2026	Intercontinental GT Challenge	AO by Absolute Racing	1	1	0	0	1	25	15th
2026	24 Hours of Le Mans - LMP2	Duqueine Team	1	0	0	0	0	N/A	DNF
2026	European Le Mans Series - LMP2 Pro-Am	DKR Engineering	1	0	0	0	0	0	18th
2026–27	Asian Le Mans Series - LMP2	AF Corse							

† Guest driver ineligible to score points

=== Complete French F4 Championship results ===
(key) (Races in bold indicate pole position) (Races in italics indicate fastest lap)

Year	1	2	3	4	5	6	7	8	9	10	11	12	13	14	15	16	17	18	19	20	21	Pos	Points
2015	LÉD; 1; 9	LÉD; 2; 2	LÉD; 3; 18†	LMS; 1; 11	LMS; 2; 15	LMS; 3; 6	PAU; 1; 7	PAU; 2; 11	PAU; 3 Ret	HUN; 1; 4	HUN; 2; 5	HUN; 3; 4	MAG; 1; 14	MAG; 2; 4	MAG; 3; 7	NAV; 1 Ret	NAV; 2; 9	NAV; 3; 2	LEC; 1; 8	LEC; 2 Ret	LEC; 3; 8	8th	116

=== Complete Porsche Carrera Cup France results ===
(key) (Races in bold indicate pole position; races in italics indicate fastest lap)

Year	Team	1	2	3	4	5	6	7	8	9	10	11	12	Pos.	Points
2016	Saintéloc Racing	CAT; 1; 8	CAT; 2; 5	SPA; 1 Ret	SPA; 2; 4	ZAN; 1; 4	ZAN; 2; 2	LMS; 1 Ret	LMS; 2; 5	IMO; 1; 5	IMO; 2; 2	LEC; 1; 2	LEC; 2; 2	5th	111
2017	Martinet by Alméras	**SPA**; **1**; 1	SPA; 2; 1	LMS; 13	DIJ; 1; 1	DIJ; 2; 1	MAG; 1; 1	MAG; 2; 3	CAT; 1; 1	CAT; 2; 7	LEC; 1; 1	LEC; 2; 5		1st	187
2018	Martinet by Alméras	SPA; 1; 2	SPA; 2; 2	**ZAN**; **1**; 1	**ZAN**; **2**; 1	**DIJ**; **1**; 9	**DIJ**; **2**; 2	**MAG**; **1**; 1	**MAG**; **2**; 1	CAT; 1; 2	**CAT**; **2**; 1	LEC; 1	LEC; 2	2nd	192

=== Complete Porsche Supercup results ===
(key) (Races in bold indicate pole position; races in italics indicate fastest lap)

Year	Team	1	2	3	4	5	6	7	8	9	10	11	Pos.	Points
2017	Martinet by Alméras	CAT	CAT	MON	RBR	SIL	HUN	SPA	SPA	MNZ	MEX; 5	MEX; 16	22nd	12
2018	Martinet by Alméras	CAT; 4	MON; 10	RBR; 2	SIL; Ret	HOC; 7	HUN; 2	SPA; 4	MNZ; 8	MEX; 1	MEX; 1		4th	127
2019	BWT Lechner Racing	**CAT**; 1	MON; 7	**RBR**; 1	SIL; 2	HOC; 4	**HUN**; 2	SPA; 9	MNZ; Ret	MEX; 4	MEX; 5		3rd	118

=== Complete FIA World Endurance Championship results ===
(key) (Races in bold indicate pole position; races in italics indicate fastest lap)

Year	Entrant	Class	Chassis	Engine	1	2	3	4	5	6	7	8	Rank	Points
2018–19	Dempsey-Proton Racing	LMGTE Am	Porsche 911 RSR	Porsche 4.0L Flat-6	**SPA**; 4	LMS; 1	SIL; 1	FUJ; DSQ	SHA; 1	**SEB**; 1	SPA	LMS; 2	6th	85
2021	Dempsey-Proton Racing	LMGTE Am	Porsche 911 RSR-19	Porsche 4.2L Flat-6	SPA	POR; 9	MON	**LMS**; 8	BHR; 12	BHR; Ret			20th	12.5
2022	Dempsey-Proton Racing	LMGTE Am	Porsche 911 RSR-19	Porsche 4.2 L Flat-6	SEB; 10	SPA	LMS	MON	FUJ	BHR			26th	2
2023	Dempsey-Proton Racing	LMGTE Am	Porsche 911 RSR-19	Porsche 4.2 L Flat-6	SEB; 2	PRT; 7	SPA; 9	LMS; Ret	MNZ; 1	FUJ; 6	BHR; 6		4th	80
2024	Proton Competition	Hypercar	Porsche 963	Porsche 4.6 L Turbo V8	QAT; 9	IMO; NC	SPA; 5	LMS; 14	SAP; 15	COA; 11	FUJ; 11	BHR; 12	24th	13
2025	Porsche Penske Motorsport	Hypercar	Porsche 963	Porsche 4.6 L Turbo V8	QAT; 10	IMO; 11	SPA; 12	LMS; 6	SAP; 3	COA; 10	FUJ; 4	BHR; 14	11th	46

=== Complete 24 Hours of Le Mans results ===
Year	Team	Co-Drivers	Car	Class	Laps	Pos.	Class Pos.
2018	(Germany) Dempsey-Proton Racing	(Australia) Matt Campbell (Germany) Christian Ried	Porsche 911 RSR	GTE; Am	335	25th	**1st**
2019	(Germany) Dempsey-Proton Racing	(Australia) Matt Campbell (Germany) Christian Ried	Porsche 911 RSR	GTE; Am	332	34th	4th
2020	(Germany) Dempsey-Proton Racing	(Thailand) Vutthikorn Inthraphuvasak (Switzerland) Lucas Légeret	Porsche 911 RSR	GTE; Am	331	36th	10th
2021	(Germany) Dempsey-Proton Racing	(Germany) Lance David Arnold (United States) Dominique Bastien	Porsche 911 RSR-19	GTE; Am	327	42nd	13th
2022	(United States) WeatherTech Racing	(United States) Cooper MacNeil (United States) Thomas Merrill	Porsche 911 RSR-19	GTE; Am	343	35th	**2nd**
2023	(Germany) Dempsey-Proton Racing	(Denmark) Mikkel O. Pedersen (Germany) Christian Ried	Porsche 911 RSR-19	GTE; Am	118	DNF	DNF
2024	(Germany) Proton Competition	(Switzerland) Neel Jani (United Kingdom) Harry Tincknell	Porsche 963	Hypercar	251	45th	16th
2025	(Germany) Porsche Penske Motorsport	(Denmark) Michael Christensen (France) Mathieu Jaminet	Porsche 963	Hypercar	386	6th	6th
2026	(France) Duqueine Team	(France) Doriane Pin (Netherlands) Richard Verschoor	Oreca 07-Gibson	LMP2	298	DNF	DNF

=== Complete GT World Challenge Europe results ===
==== GT World Challenge Europe Endurance Cup ====
(key) (Races in bold indicate pole position) (Races in italics indicate fastest lap)

Year	Team	Car	Class	1	2	3	4	5	6	7	Pos.	Points
2020	Rowe Racing	Porsche 911 GT3 R	Pro	IMO; 6	NÜR; WD	SPA; 6H; 19	SPA; 12H; 14	SPA; 24H; 32	LEC		18th	8
2022	Toksport WRT	Porsche 911 GT3 R	Pro	IMO	LEC	SPA; 6H; 23	SPA; 12H; 16	SPA; 24H; Ret	HOC	CAT	NC	0
2023	Manthey EMA	Porsche 911 GT3 R (992)	Pro	MNZ	LEC	SPA; 6H; 5	SPA; 12H; 7	SPA; 24H; 4	NÜR	CAT	13th	20
2024	Rutronik Racing	Porsche 911 GT3 R (992)	Pro	LEC; 5	SPA; 6H; 38	SPA; 12H; 25	SPA; 24H; 9	**NÜR**; Ret	MNZ; 13	JED; 36†	17th	13

=== Complete Asian Le Mans Series results ===
(key) (Races in bold indicate pole position) (Races in italics indicate fastest lap)

Year	Team	Class	Car	Engine	1	2	3	4	5	6	Pos.	Points
2021	GPX Racing	GT	Porsche 911 GT3 R	Porsche 4.0 L Flat-6	DUB; 1; 4	DUB; 2; 1	ABU; 1; 1	ABU; 2; 14			2nd	62.5
2023–24	Proton Competition	LMP2	Oreca 07	Gibson GK428 4.2 L V8	SEP; 1; 5	SEP; 2; 3	DUB; 2	ABU; 1; 5	ABU; 2; 2		2nd	71
2024–25	Pure Rxcing	LMP2	Oreca 07	Gibson GK428 4.2 L V8	SEP; 1	SEP; 2	DUB; 1; 8	DUB; 2; 8	ABU; 1; 7	ABU; 2; 8	13th	18

=== Complete IMSA SportsCar Championship results ===
(key) (Races in bold indicate pole position; results in italics indicate fastest lap)

Year	Team	Class	Make	Engine	1	2	3	4	5	6	7	8	9	10	11	Pos.	Points
2022	WeatherTech Racing	GTD Pro	Porsche 911 GT3 R	Porsche 4.0 L Flat-6	DAY; 8	SEB; 6	LBH	LGA	WGL	MOS	LIM	ELK	VIR	PET		21st	524
2023	Kelly-Moss with Riley	GTD	Porsche 911 GT3 R (992)	Porsche 4.2 L Flat-6	DAY; 16	SEB; 3	LBH	**LGA**; 3	WGL; 10	MOS	LIM; 2	ELK	VIR	IMS	PET; 10	18th	1667
2024	Kellymoss with Riley	GTD	Porsche 911 GT3 R (992)	Porsche 4.2 L Flat-6	DAY; 11											208	63th
2024	AO Racing	GTD Pro	Porsche 911 GT3 R (992)	Porsche 4.2 L Flat-6							MOS	ELK; 4	VIR	IMS	PET; 11	536	28th
2024	Proton Competition Mustang Sampling	GTP	Porsche 963	Porsche 9RD 4.6 L V8		SEB; 8	LBH	LGA	DET	WGL						254	31th
2025	Proton Competition	GTP	Porsche 963	Porsche 9RD 4.6 L V8	DAY; 10	SEB	LBH	LGA	DET	WGL	MOS	ELK	VIR	IMS		10th	230
2025	Porsche Penske Motorsport	GTP	Porsche 963	Porsche 9RD 4.6 L V8											PET; WD	10th	230
2026	Porsche Penske Motorsport	GTP	Porsche 963	Porsche 9RD 4.6 L V8	DAY; 1	SEB; 1	LBH; 4	LGA; 7	DET; 5	WGL; 5	ELK; 6	IMS; 11	PET; 8			7th	2638

^{*} Season still in progress.

=== Complete European Le Mans Series results ===
(key) (Races in bold indicate pole position; results in italics indicate fastest lap)

Year	Entrant	Class	Chassis	Engine	1	2	3	4	5	6	Rank	Points
2023	Proton Competition	LMGTE	Porsche 911 RSR-19	Porsche 4.2 L Flat-6	CAT; Ret	**LEC**; 1	ARA; 4	SPA; 8	PRT; 1	ALG; 2	2nd	85
2024	Proton Competition	LMGT3	Porsche 911 GT3 R (992)	Porsche 4.2 L Flat-6	CAT; 4	LEC; 8	IMO; 11	SPA; 6	MUG; Ret	ALG; 3	13th	39
2026	DKR Engineering	LMP2 Pro-Am	Oreca 07	Gibson GK428 4.2 L V8	CAT	LEC	IMO	SPA; 12	SIL	ALG	18th	0

^{*} Season still in progress.

Sporting positions
Preceded by Mathieu Jaminet	Porsche Carrera Cup France; Champion; 2017	Succeeded by Ayhancan Güven
Preceded by Thomas Preining	Porsche Carrera Cup Germany; Winner; 2019	Succeeded by Larry ten Voorde
