= Mikkel O. Pedersen =

Danish racing driver

Mikkel Pedersen
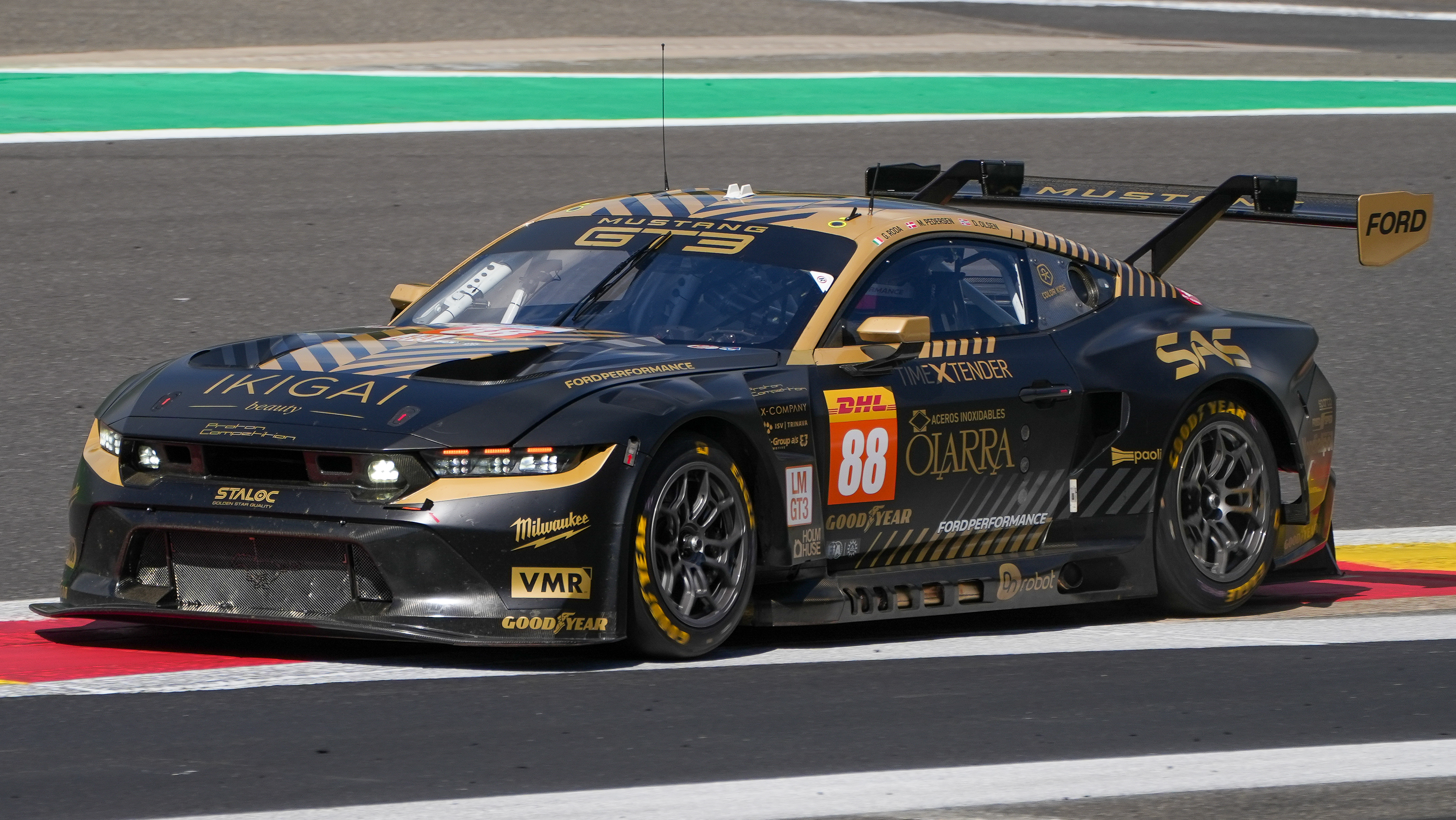
- Nationality: (Denmark) Danish
- Born: Mikkel Overgaard Pedersen; 26 January 1997 (age 29) Struer, Denmark

FIA World Endurance Championship career
- Debut season: 2022
- Current team: Dempsey-Proton Racing
- Categorisation: FIA Silver
- Car number: 77
- Former teams: Team Project 1
- Starts: 13
- Wins: 2
- Podiums: 4
- Poles: 0
- Fastest laps: 2
- Statistics up to date as of 17 November 2023.

Mikkel Overgaard Pedersen (born 26 January 1997) is a Danish racing driver who competes in the FIA World Endurance Championship for Dempsey-Proton Racing.

== Career ==
=== Early career ===
Born in Struer, Denmark, Pedersen's racing career began in karting at the age of seven. It was a family operation, with the Pedersens running the team out of a van in which they'd house the kart and travel to races. On Friday evenings, Mikkel would frequently watch the Porsche Supercup on TV, a series which he'd eventually compete in himself. Throughout his career Pedersen has relied on local sponsor support to fund his racing endeavors.

In 2012, Pedersen made his junior formula debut, taking part in the Danish Formula Ford Championship with DP Engineering. Pedersen's opening season in the series saw him compete in the Zetec category, driving the car that teammate Morten Dons had piloted the year prior. The following season, he stepped into Porsche racing, initially at a local level before expanding to the Porsche Carrera Cup Scandinavia in 2015. At the conclusion of the 2015 season, Pedersen traveled to the Lausitzring to take part in the annual Porsche Junior Shootout.

=== Porsche Supercup ===
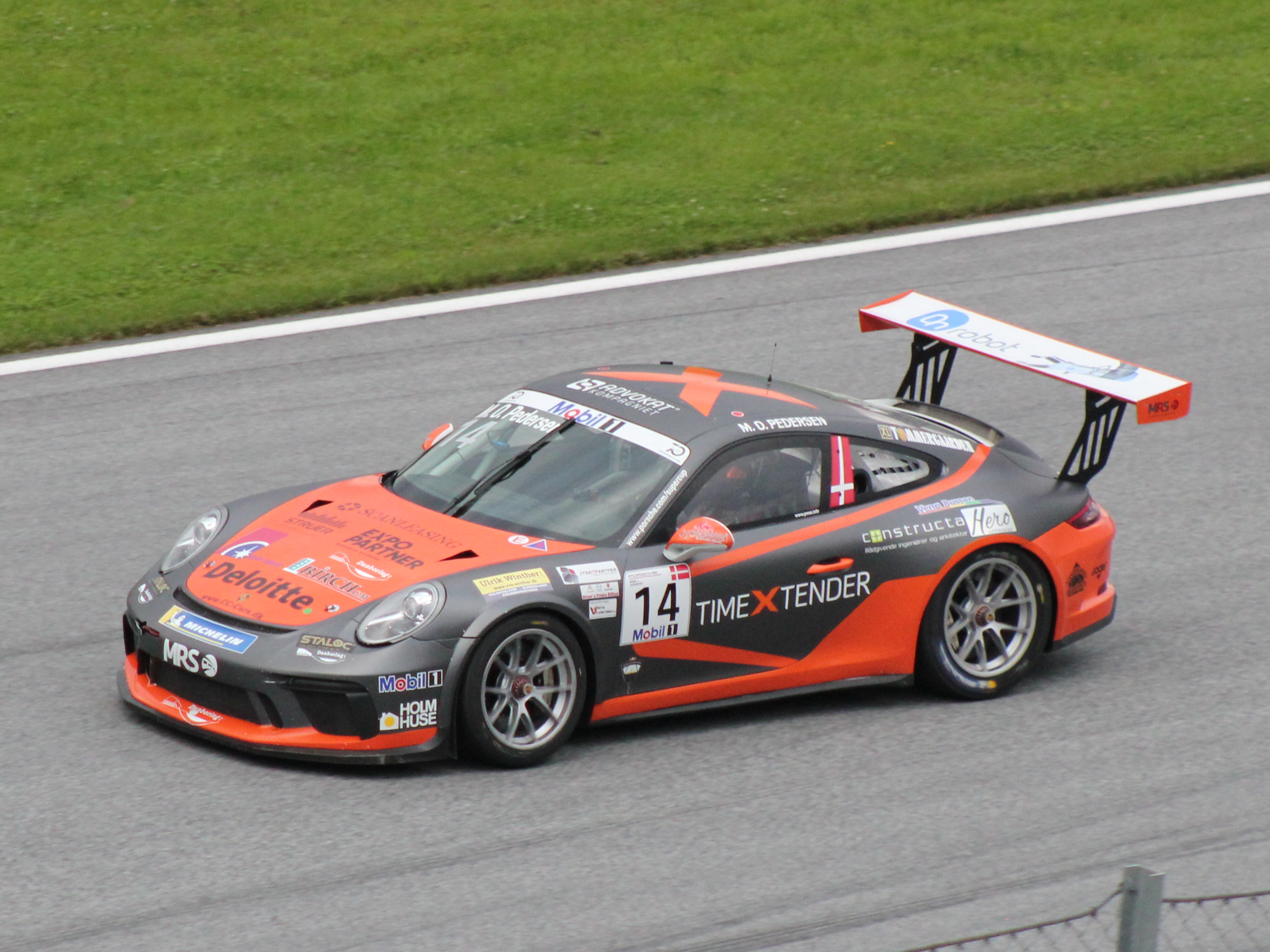
Pedersen's Porsche 911 GT3 Cup at Red Bull Ring in 2018.

Pedersen made his Supercup debut at the end of the 2015 season at Circuit of the Americas, where he was disqualified from the second event after the first race was canceled. The following season, Pedersen lined up a part-time campaign with MRS-GT Racing, supplemented with a drive at the 2016 Dubai 24 Hour. In 2017, he was able to compete for the full season, tallying a best finish of eighth at Autódromo Hermanos Rodríguez. His second full-time season improved on the prior, with Pedersen registering three top-ten finishes including a fifth-place finish at Monaco and a sixth-place finish at Hockenheim. At the conclusion of the 2018 season, he was named Motorsport Talent of the Year at the Danish Motorsport Awards.

In 2019, Pedersen left MRS-GT Racing, taking part in his fifth year in the series with Italian outfit Dinamic Motorsport. After utilizing a 2017 model for the previous two years, Pedersen upgraded to a 2019-spec version of the car. 2019 was Pedersen's best statistical season to date, as he claimed his maiden podium finish at Monaco and tallied two fastest laps, once at Monaco and again at Monza. He would finish eighth in the championship, racking up 80 championship points.

=== GT3 and beyond ===
In 2020, Pedersen continued with Dinamic for the team's globe-trotting GT3 program for the year. In January, he began the season at the Dubai 24 Hour, finishing on the GT3-Am class podium. Pedersen's primary program for the season was a drive in the GT World Challenge Europe Endurance Cup, where he'd join Adrien De Leener and Andrea Rizzoli in Dinamic's Silver Cup entry. In the opening round of the season at Imola, Pedersen's entry finished on the class podium, and would finish the season 13th in the Silver Cup classification. Pedersen returned to the team for the following season, stepping up to the Pro class as Romain Dumas replaced De Leener in the lineup. The team would claim just one point, earned in a tenth-place finish at Monza, and finished 32nd in the series championship.

Pedersen's program expanded in 2022, where he took on drives in the FIA World Endurance Championship, Le Mans Cup, and GT World Challenge Europe Endurance Cup. In the WEC, Pedersen served as the silver-ranked driver in one of Team Project 1's GTE Am class entries, joining Matteo Cairoli and Nicolas Leutwiler. With full-season entries guaranteeing a spot at the 24 Hours of Le Mans, Pedersen was able to fulfill a career dream of competing in the race. Although the entry retired due to puncture damage, the rest of the season proved relatively successful. The team claimed their first podium finish of the season at Monza, before taking victory in the final race of the season, the 8 Hours of Bahrain. The trio were classified seventh in the GTE Am class championship.

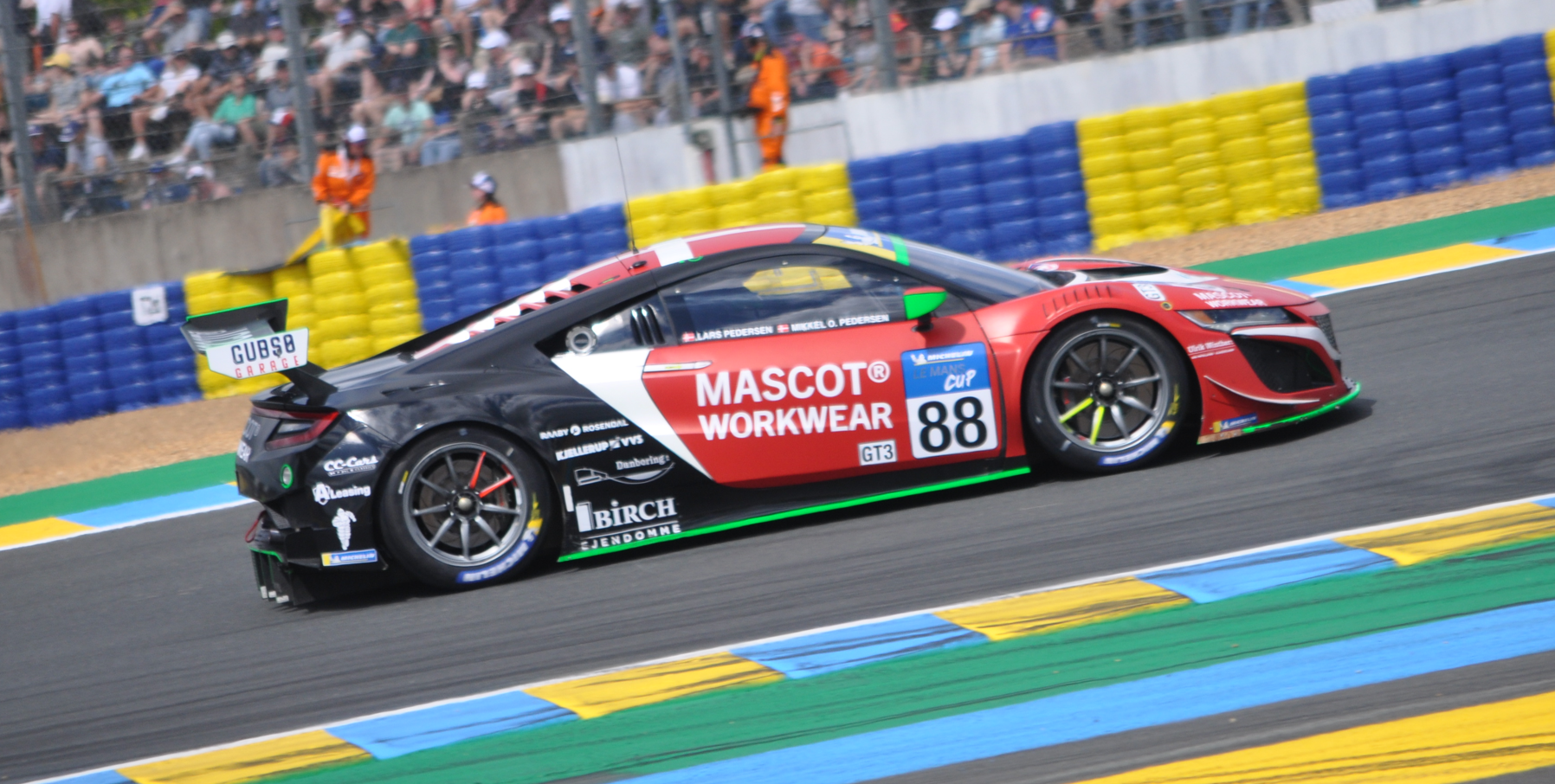
Pedersen's Honda NSX GT3 at Circuit de la Sarthe in 2022.

Pedersen's Le Mans Cup campaign took place with Danish team GMB Motorsport, where he piloted a Honda NSX GT3. He joined the team due to their long-term goal to compete at Le Mans in 2024, with the GT3 class being introduced to the race that year. Although he did not compete in the full season, being replaced by Jan Magnussen after the Monza round, Pedersen and co-driver Lars Engelbreckt Pedersen claimed one class victory over the course of five races.

Pedersen's GT World Challenge Europe campaign was much more patchwork than his previous endeavors. After re-joining Dinamic Motorsport for an expected one-off at the 24 Hours of Spa, Pedersen was asked to finish the season, joining Marius Nakken and Giorgio Roda in the team's Silver Cup entry. Pedersen scored 12 points over the course of three races, finishing 22nd in the class championship.

Pedersen began his 2023 campaign by taking part in the Asian Le Mans Series with Herberth Motorsport. During the four-race championship, the returning trio from the previous season's WEC entry tallied two top-five finishes and finished sixth in the championship. Pedersen's season continued with a full-season drive in the 2023 edition of the World Endurance Championship, albeit with a different team. He joined Dempsey-Proton Racing, driving alongside team principal Christian Ried and Frenchman Julien Andlauer. In the trio's first race, the 2023 1000 Miles of Sebring, the team claimed a podium finish. They claimed their first and only victory of the season at Monza in July, and would end up finishing fourth in the GTE Am class championship. At the end of the season, Pedersen drove a Proton-supplied Oreca 07 at the Bahrain rookie test.

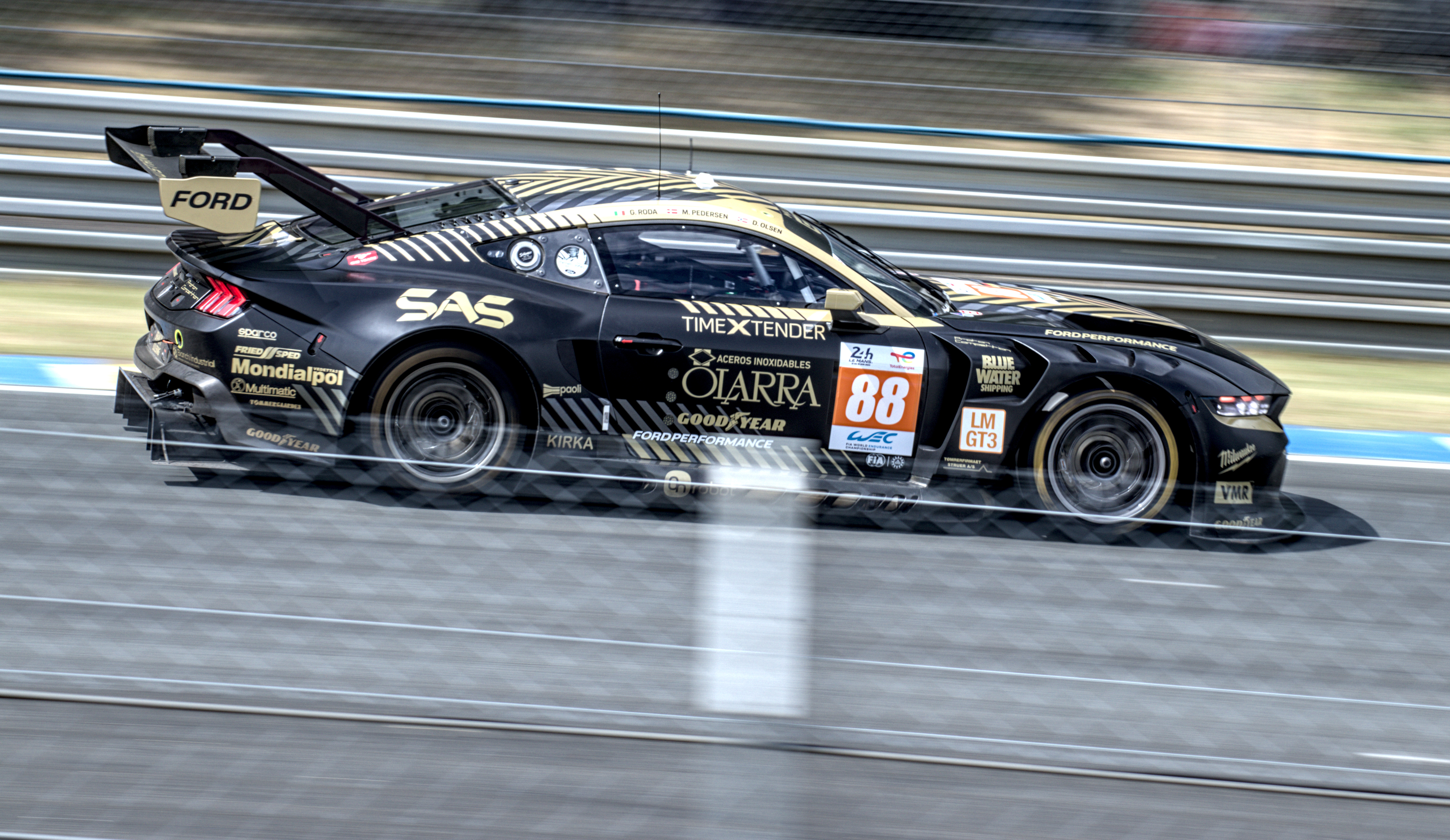
Pedersen's No. 88 car at the 2024 24 Hours of Le Mans

Pedersen remained at Proton for the 2024 season, driving alongside Dennis Olsen and Giorgio Roda in the newly-formed LMGT3 class. The trio scored points in two of the opening three races, before taking a podium at the Le Mans 24 Hours, with Pedersen and Olsen performing especially well during Sunday morning.

== Karting record ==
=== Karting career summary ===
Season	Series	Team	Position
2009	Racehall of Champions - 55 kg		2nd
2011	Rotax Max Euro Trophy - Junior Max	Struer Kart Racing	57th
2019	Super Kart Denmark - KZ2		20th

== Racing record ==
=== Racing career summary ===
Season	Series	Team	Races	Wins	Poles	F/Laps	Podiums	Points	Position
2012	Danish Formula Ford Championship - Zetec	DP Engineering	20	?	?	?	?	96	8th
2012	Formula Ford 1600 Nordic	DP Engineering	3	?	?	?	?	11	10th
2015	Porsche Carrera Cup Scandinavia	Norges Racing Team	12	0	0	1	2	113	4th
2015	Swedish GT Championship	Norges Racing Team	4	0	0	0	1	54	5th
2015	Porsche Supercup	Land Motorsport	1	0	0	0	0	0	NC
2016	Porsche Supercup	MRS-GT Racing	3	0	0	0	0	4	23rd
2016	24H Series - 991	MRS-GT Racing	1	0	0	0	0	0	NC
2017	Porsche Supercup	MRS-GT Racing	11	0	0	0	0	37	13th
2018	Porsche Supercup	MRS-GT Racing	10	0	0	0	0	39	11th
2019	Porsche Supercup	Dinamic Motorsport	10	0	0	2	1	80	8th
2019	Porsche Carrera Cup France	Dinamic Motorsport	2	0	0	0	0	0	NC
2020	GT World Challenge Europe Endurance Cup	Dinamic Motorsport	4	0	0	0	0	0	NC
2020	GT World Challenge Europe Endurance Cup - Silver Cup	Dinamic Motorsport	4	0	0	0	1	30	13th
2020	Intercontinental GT Challenge	Dinamic Motorsport	1	0	0	0	0	0	NC
2020	24H GT Series - GT3-Am	Dinamic Motorsport	1	0	?	?	1	24	6th
2020	Danish Endurance Championship - Class 4	Mikkel O. Pedersen Racing	4	3	?	?	3	179	**2nd**
2020	Special Saloon Car - Extreme Denmark	Mikkel O. Pedersen Racing	?	?	1	?	?	1	9th
2021	GT World Challenge Europe Endurance Cup	Dinamic Motorsport	5	0	0	0	0	1	32nd
2021	Danish Endurance Championship - Class 5	Mikkel O. Pedersen Racing	1	0	?	?	1	?	?
2022	FIA World Endurance Championship - LMGTE Am	Team Project 1	6	1	0	2	2	71	7th
2022	Le Mans Cup - GT3	GMB Motorsport	5	1	0	1	1	57	5th
2022	GT World Challenge Europe Endurance Cup	Dinamic Motorsport	3	0	0	0	0	0	NC
2022	GT World Challenge Europe Endurance Cup - Silver Cup	Dinamic Motorsport	3	0	0	1	0	12	22nd
2023	Asian Le Mans Series - GT	Herberth Motorsport	4	0	0	0	0	24	6th
2023	FIA World Endurance Championship - LMGTE Am	Dempsey-Proton Racing	7	1	0	0	2	80	4th
2023	24 Hours of Le Mans - LMGTE Am	Dempsey-Proton Racing	1	0	0	0	0	N/A	DNF
2024	FIA World Endurance Championship - LMGT3	Proton Competition	7	0	0	0	1	37	16th
2025	GT World Challenge Europe Endurance Cup	Dinamic GT	3	0	0	0	0	0	NC
2026	IMSA SportsCar Championship - GTD	AO Racing	1	0	0	0	0	202	73rd
2026	International GT Open	Mikkel O. Pedersen Racing	6	0	0	1	0	0	51st
2026	GT World Challenge Europe Sprint Cup	Pure Rxcing	4	0	0	0	0	0	NC
2026	GT World Challenge Europe Sprint Cup – Silver	Pure Rxcing	4	0	0	0	0	2	14th
2026	GT World Challenge Europe Endurance Cup	Pure Rxcing	2	0	0	0	0	0	NC
2026	GT World Challenge Europe Endurance Cup – Silver	Pure Rxcing	2	0	0	0	0	12	25th

^{*} Season still in progress.

=== Complete Porsche Supercup results ===
(key) (Races in bold indicate pole position) (Races in italics indicate fastest lap)

Year	Team	1	2	3	4	5	6	7	8	9	10	11	Pos.	Points
2015	Land Motorsport	CAT	MON	RBR	SIL	HUN	SPA	SPA	MNZ	MNZ	COA; C	COA; DSQ	NC†	0
2016	MRS-GT Racing	CAT; 12	MON; Ret	RBR	SIL	HUN	HOC; Ret	SPA	MNZ	COA	COA		23rd	4
2017	MRS-GT Racing	CAT; 16	CAT; 12	MON; 10	RBR; 18	SIL; Ret	HUN; 24†	SPA; 14	SPA; 12	MNZ; 15	MEX; 8	MEX; 10	13th	37
2018	MRS-GT Racing	CAT; 12	MON; 5	RBR; 20	SIL; 16	HOC; 6	HUN; 14	SPA; 15	MNZ; 27†	MEX; Ret	MEX; 10		11th	39
2019	Dinamic Motorsport	CAT; 6	MON; 2	RBR; 6	SIL; 7	HOC; Ret	HUN; 16	SPA; 10	MNZ; 4	MEX; Ret	MEX; 6		8th	80

† – Driver did not finish the race, but were classified as they completed over 75% of the race distance.

=== Complete GT World Challenge Europe results ===
==== GT World Challenge Europe Endurance Cup ====
(key) (Races in bold indicate pole position; races in italics indicate fastest lap)

Year	Team	Car	Class	1	2	3	4	5	6	7	Pos.	Points
2020	Dinamic Motorsport	Porsche 911 GT3 R	Silver	IMO; 16	NÜR; 31	SPA; 6H; 38	SPA; 12H; 48	SPA; 24H; Ret	LEC; 23		13th	30
2021	Dinamic Motorsport	Porsche 911 GT3 R	Pro	MNZ; 10	LEC; 12	SPA; 6H; 43	SPA; 12H; Ret	SPA; 24H; Ret	NÜR; 36†	CAT; 19	32nd	1
2022	Dinamic Motorsport	Porsche 911 GT3 R	Silver	IMO	LEC	SPA; 6H; 33	SPA; 12H; 35	SPA; 24H; 25	HOC; 26	CAT; Ret	22nd	12
2025	Dinamic GT	Porsche 911 GT3 R (992)	Silver	LEC	MNZ; 45†	SPA; 6H	SPA; 12H	SPA; 24H	NÜR; 32	CAT; 29	37th	5
2026	Pure Rxcing	Porsche 911 GT3 R (992.2)	Silver	LEC	MNZ	SPA; 6H	SPA; 12H	SPA; 24H	NÜR; 22	ALG; Ret	25th	12

† – Driver did not finish the race, but were classified as they completed over 75% of the race distance.

==== GT World Challenge Europe Sprint Cup ====
(key) (Races in bold indicate pole position; races in italics indicate fastest lap)

Year	Team	Car	Class	1	2	3	4	5	6	7	8	9	10	Pos.	Points
2026	Pure Rxcing	Porsche 911 GT3 R (992.2)	Silver	BRH; 1	BRH; 2	MIS; 1	MIS; 2	MAG; 1; 35	MAG; 2 Ret	ZAN; 1	ZAN; 2	CAT; 1 Ret	CAT; 2 Ret	14th	2

=== Complete FIA World Endurance Championship results ===
(key) (Races in bold indicate pole position; races in italics indicate fastest lap)

Year	Entrant	Class	Chassis	Engine	1	2	3	4	5	6	7	8	Rank	Points
2022	Team Project 1	LMGTE Am	Porsche 911 RSR-19	Porsche 4.2 L Flat-6	SEB; Ret	SPA; 5	LMS; Ret	MON; 3	FUJ; 6	BHR; 1			7th	71
2023	Dempsey-Proton Racing	LMGTE Am	Porsche 911 RSR-19	Porsche 4.2 L Flat-6	SEB; 2	PRT; 7	SPA; 9	LMS; Ret	MNZ; 1	FUJ; 6	BHR; 6		4th	80
2024	Proton Competition	LMGT3	Ford Mustang GT3	Ford Coyote 5.4 L V8	QAT; 9	IMO; Ret	SPA; 8	LMS; 3	SÃO; 13	COA; NC	FUJ; 16	BHR	16th	37

^{*} Season still in progress.

=== Complete Asian Le Mans Series results ===
(key) (Races in bold indicate pole position; races in italics indicate fastest lap)

Year	Entrant	Class	Chassis	Engine	1	2	3	4	Rank	Points
2023	Herberth Motorsport	GT	Porsche 911 GT3 R	Porsche 4.0 L Flat-6	DUB; 1; 5	DUB; 2; 16	ABU; 1; 9	ABU; 2; 4	6th	24

=== Complete 24 Hours of Le Mans results ===
Year	Team	Co-Drivers	Car	Class	Laps	Pos.	Class Pos.
2022	(Germany) Team Project 1	(Italy) Matteo Cairoli (Switzerland) Nicolas Leutwiler	Porsche 911 RSR-19	GTE; Am	77	DNF	DNF
2023	(Germany) Dempsey-Proton Racing	(France) Julien Andlauer (Germany) Christian Ried	Porsche 911 RSR-19	GTE; Am	118	DNF	DNF
2024	(Germany) Proton Competition	(Norway) Dennis Olsen (Italy) Giorgio Roda	Ford Mustang GT3	LMGT3	280	30th	**3rd**

=== Complete IMSA SportsCar Championship results ===
(key) (Races in bold indicate pole position; results in italics indicate fastest lap)

Year	Team	Class	Make	Engine	1	2	3	4	5	6	7	8	9	10	Rank	Points
2026	AO Racing	GTD	Porsche 911 GT3 R (992.2)	Porsche 4.2 L Flat-6	DAY	SEB	LBH; 13	LGA	WGL	MOS	ELK	VIR	IMS	PET	73rd	202
