= 2017 Porsche Supercup =

25th Porsche Supercup season

The 2017 Porsche Mobil 1 Supercup was the 25th Porsche Supercup season. It began on 13 May at Circuit de Catalunya and finished on 29 October at Autódromo Hermanos Rodríguez, after eleven scheduled races, all of which were support events for the 2017 Formula One season.

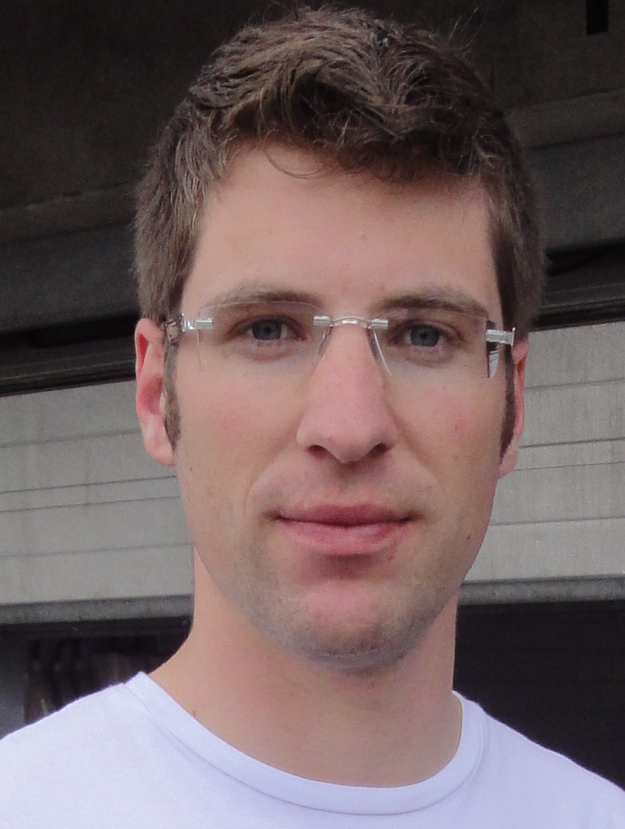
Michael Ammermüller (pictured in 2010) won his first Drivers' Championship title

== Rule changes for 2017 ==
=== Technical ===
- The outgoing Porsche 911 GT3 Cup (Type 991) car fleet was replaced by Porsche 911 GT3 Cup (Type 991.2) for all Porsche Supercup entrants from 2017 to 2020 seasons.
- Gasoline direct injection became mandatory fuel feed for full time series entrants as Porsche 911 GT3 Cup (Type 991.2) car utilized the all-new MA1.76/MDG.G petrol engines as electronic multipoint indirect fuel injection officially phased out after twenty-four seasons.

== Teams and drivers ==
Full list of drivers that will participate in the 2017 season:

Team	No.	Drivers	Class	Rounds
(Austria) Lechner MSG Racing Team	1	(Germany) Michael Ammermüller		All
(Austria) Lechner MSG Racing Team	2	(United Kingdom) Dan Cammish		All
(Austria) Lechner MSG Racing Team	30	(Singapore) Sean Hudspeth	G	4–8
(Austria) Walter Lechner Racing Team	3	(Republic of Ireland) Ryan Cullen		1–9
(Austria) Walter Lechner Racing Team	3	(Austria) Thomas Preining	R	10–11
(Austria) Walter Lechner Racing Team	4	(Norway) Dennis Olsen	R	All
(Austria) Walter Lechner Racing Team	41	(Austria) Thomas Preining	G	6, 9
(Austria) Walter Lechner Racing Team	42	(Sweden) Henric Skoog	G	7–8
(Switzerland) Fach Auto Tech	5	(United Kingdom) Josh Webster	R	All
(Switzerland) Fach Auto Tech	6	(Switzerland) Glauco Solieri	B	All
(Switzerland) Fach Auto Tech	7	(Australia) Matt Campbell	R	All
(Poland) FÖRCH Racing by Lukas Motorsport	8	(Mexico) Santiago Creel		All
(Poland) FÖRCH Racing by Lukas Motorsport	9	(Germany) Christopher Bauer		All
(Poland) Olimp Racing by Lukas Motorsport	10	(Poland) Piotr Parys	R	1–2, 4–9
(Poland) Olimp Racing by Lukas Motorsport	10	(Austria) Željko Drmić		3
(Poland) Olimp Racing by Lukas Motorsport	10	(Mexico) Pablo Sánchez López	G	10–11
(Poland) Olimp Racing by Lukas Motorsport	11	(Poland) Robert Lukas		All
(Poland) Olimp Racing by Lukas Motorsport	12	(Poland) Igor Waliłko	R	All
(Germany) MRS GT-Racing	14	(Denmark) Mikkel O. Pedersen	R	All
(Germany) MRS GT-Racing	15	(Kuwait) Zaid Ashkanani		All
(Germany) MRS GT-Racing	40	(Austria) Philipp Sager	B	5, 9
(Germany) MRS GT-Racing	40	(Mexico) Ricardo Pérez	B G	10–11
(Germany) MRS Cup-Racing	16	(Norway) Roar Lindland	B	All
(Germany) MRS Cup-Racing	17	(Germany) Christof Langer	B	1–3, 5–6, 9–11
(Germany) MRS Cup-Racing	17	(Austria) Philipp Sager	B	4
(Germany) MRS Cup-Racing	31	(Japan) Kenji Kobayashi	G	1–2, 7–8
(Germany) MRS Cup-Racing	31	(Mexico) Eduardo de Léon	B G	10–11
(France) Martinet by Alméras	18	(France) Steven Palette		1–9
(France) Martinet by Alméras	18	(France) Julien Andlauer		10–11
(France) Martinet by Alméras	19	(Sweden) Philip Morin	R	1–9
(France) Martinet by Alméras	19	(France) Florian Latorre		10–11
(France) Martinet by Alméras	20	(France) Roland Bervillé	B	All
(United States) MOMO-Megatron Team Partrax	21	(United Kingdom) Paul Rees		All
(United States) MOMO-Megatron Team Partrax	22	(Switzerland) Nico Rindlisbacher	R	1–6
(United States) MOMO-Megatron Team Partrax	22	(United Kingdom) Nick Yelloly		7–8
(United States) MOMO-Megatron Team Partrax	22	(Netherlands) Jaap van Lagen		9
(United States) MOMO-Megatron Team Partrax	22	(Sweden) Philip Morin		10–11
(United States) MOMO-Megatron Team Partrax	23	(Netherlands) Egidio Perfetti	B	All
(Bahrain) Lechner Racing Middle East	24	(Luxembourg) Dylan Pereira		1–9
(Bahrain) Lechner Racing Middle East	24	(Republic of Ireland) Ryan Cullen		10–11
(Bahrain) Lechner Racing Middle East	25	(Oman) Al Faisal Al Zubair	R	All
(Bahrain) Lechner Racing Middle East	30	(United Kingdom) Tom Oliphant	G	1–2
(United Kingdom) IDL Racing	26	(United Kingdom) Tom Sharp		All
(United Kingdom) IDL Racing	27	(United Kingdom) Mark Radcliffe	B	All
(Italy) Dinamic Motorsport	28	(Italy) Mattia Drudi	R	All
(Italy) Dinamic Motorsport	29	(Italy) Daniele Di Amato		All
(Italy) Dinamic Motorsport	34	(Italy) Giovanni Berton	G	1–2, 4
(Italy) Dinamic Motorsport	34	(Italy) Gianmarco Quaresmini	G	7–9
(Germany) raceunion Huber Racing	36	(Netherlands) Wolf Nathan		4
(Germany) raceunion Huber Racing	37	(Germany) Wolfgang Triller	B	4
(United Kingdom) Porsche Cars GB	38	(United Kingdom) Tom Oliphant	G	5
(United Kingdom) Porsche Cars GB	39	(Republic of Ireland) Charlie Eastwood	G	5

Icon	Meaning
B	B-class
R	Rookie
G	Guest

== Race calendar ==
Round	Circuit	Date	Pole position	Fastest lap	Winning driver	Winning team
1	(Spain) Circuit de Catalunya, Barcelona	13 May	(Australia) Matt Campbell	(Germany) Michael Ammermüller	(Germany) Michael Ammermüller	(Austria) Lechner MSG Racing Team
2	(Spain) Circuit de Catalunya, Barcelona	14 May	(Australia) Matt Campbell	(Norway) Dennis Olsen	(Germany) Michael Ammermüller	(Austria) Lechner MSG Racing Team
3	Circuit de Monaco, Monte Carlo	28 May	(Germany) Michael Ammermüller	(United Kingdom) Dan Cammish	(Germany) Michael Ammermüller	(Austria) Lechner MSG Racing Team
4	(Austria) Red Bull Ring, Spielberg	9 July	(Australia) Matt Campbell	(Luxembourg) Dylan Pereira	(Australia) Matt Campbell	(Switzerland) Fach Auto Tech
5	(United Kingdom) Silverstone Circuit, Silverstone	16 July	(Norway) Dennis Olsen	(Norway) Dennis Olsen	(Norway) Dennis Olsen	(Austria) Walter Lechner Racing Team
6	(Hungary) Hungaroring, Budapest	30 July	(Germany) Michael Ammermüller	(United Kingdom) Dan Cammish	(Germany) Michael Ammermüller	(Austria) Lechner MSG Racing Team
7	(Belgium) Circuit de Spa-Francorchamps, Stavelot	26 August	(Norway) Dennis Olsen	(United Kingdom) Dan Cammish	(Norway) Dennis Olsen	(Austria) Walter Lechner Racing Team
8	(Belgium) Circuit de Spa-Francorchamps, Stavelot	27 August	(Norway) Dennis Olsen	(Norway) Dennis Olsen	(Norway) Dennis Olsen	(Austria) Walter Lechner Racing Team
9	(Italy) Autodromo Nazionale Monza, Monza	3 September	(Australia) Matt Campbell	(Germany) Michael Ammermüller	(Australia) Matt Campbell	(Switzerland) Fach Auto Tech
10	Autódromo Hermanos Rodríguez, Mexico City	28 October	(Norway) Dennis Olsen	(Australia) Matt Campbell	(Australia) Matt Campbell	(Switzerland) Fach Auto Tech
11	Autódromo Hermanos Rodríguez, Mexico City	29 October	(Australia) Matt Campbell	(Germany) Michael Ammermüller	(Australia) Matt Campbell	(Switzerland) Fach Auto Tech

== Championship standings ==
=== Drivers' Championship ===
Pos.	Driver	CAT (Spain)		MON (Monaco)	RBR (Austria)	SIL (United Kingdom)	HUN (Hungary)	SPA (Belgium)		MNZ (Italy)	MEX (Mexico)		Points
1	(Germany) Michael Ammermüller	1	1	**1**	2	2	**1**	3	2	10	2	2	193
2	(Norway) Dennis Olsen	2	2	3	5	**1**	2	**1**	**1**	5	**3**	3	186
3	(Australia) Matt Campbell	**5**	**3**	5	**1**	7	16	6	5	**1**	1	**1**	151
4	(United Kingdom) Daniel Cammish	3	4	2	8	4	3	4	Ret	9	4	29†	122
5	(Poland) Robert Lukas	4	9	7	7	6	4	5	6	7	Ret	8	103
6	(Italy) Mattia Drudi	7	Ret	11	4	8	5	2	19	3	26†	7	91
7	(United Kingdom) Josh Webster	6	19	8	6	5	15	9	9	11	7	4	85
8	(Luxembourg) Dylan Pereira	8	5	Ret	3	3	6	10	3	Ret			84
9	(Kuwait) Zaid Ashkanani	9	Ret	4	11	13	Ret	12	8	2	14	6	74
10	(Italy) Daniele Di Amato	11	8	6	16	12	12	8	25	Ret	18	13	47
11	(Republic of Ireland) Ryan Cullen	21	16	12	12	Ret	Ret	15	11	6	9	9	41
12	(Sweden) Philip Morin	15	7	Ret	10	9	8	19	22	19	10	15	40
13	(Denmark) Mikkel O. Pedersen	16	12	10	18	Ret	24†	14	12	15	8	10	37
14	(Oman) Al Faisal Al Zubair	19	13	Ret	16	15	9	22	26	12	11	12	29
15	(France) Steven Palette	14	10	9	9	16	17	18	DSQ	18			26
16	(United Kingdom) Paul Rees	13	11	Ret	15	17	14	24	13	Ret	12	13	25
17	(Poland) Igor Waliłko	12	DSQ	Ret	14	14	11	11	24	28†	13	28†	24
18	(United Kingdom) Nick Yelloly							7	4				23
19	(Austria) Thomas Preining						18			8	6	5	22
20	(Poland) Piotr Parys	Ret	18		18	18	7	17	10	17			17
21	(Netherlands) Jaap van Lagen									4			14
22	(France) Julien Andlauer										5	16	12
23	(United Kingdom) Tom Sharp	20	14	Ret	13	30	Ret	16	14	16	25†	Ret	12
24	(Switzerland) Nico Rindlisbacher	DNS	24	14	17	20	10						8
25	(Netherlands) Egidio Perfetti	17	Ret	15	21	21	13	20	Ret	13	21	24	8
26	(Norway) Roar Lindland	22	15	13	20	22	DSQ	21	Ret	20	Ret	14	7
27	(Germany) Christopher Bauer	18	17	19	23	23	Ret	25	15	22	15	17	3
28	(United Kingdom) Mark Radcliffe	26	25	17	32†	26	21	29	16	23	16	22	1
29	(Switzerland) Giauco Solieri	25	21	16	29	28	19	27	Ret	25	20	23	0
30	(France) Roland Bervillé	24	20	18	28	27	20	28	17	24	23	18	0
31	(Mexico) Santiago Creel	23	22	Ret	30	24	23	30	20	27	19	20	0
32	(Germany) Christof Langer	28	23	20		29	22			26	22	19	0
33	(Austria) Philipp Sager				26	25				21			0
34	(Netherlands) Wolf Nathan				25								0
35	(France) Florian Latorre										Ret	27†	0
36	(Germany) Wolfgang Triller				31								0
-	(Austria) Željko Drmić			DNQ									0
Guest drivers ineligible for points
-	(United Kingdom) Tom Oliphant	10	6			11							0
-	(Sweden) Henric Skoog							13	7				0
-	(Republic of Ireland) Charlie Eastwood					10							0
-	(Italy) Gianmarco Quaresmini							23	23	14			0
-	(Mexico) Ricardo Pérez										17	21	0
-	(Singapore) Sean Hudspeth				19	19	Ret	26	18				0
-	(Japan) Kenji Kobayashi	27	26					31	21				0
-	(Mexico) Eduardo de Léon										24	25	0
-	(Mexico) Pablo Sánchez López										Ret	26	0
-	(Italy) Giovanni Berton	Ret	27		27								0
Pos.	Driver	CAT (Spain)		MON (Monaco)	RBR (Austria)	SIL (United Kingdom)	HUN (Hungary)	SPA (Belgium)		MNZ (Italy)	MEX (Mexico)		Points

Colour	Result
Gold	Winner
Silver	Second place
Bronze	Third place
Green	Points classification
Blue	Non-points classification
Blue	Non-classified finish (NC)
Purple	Retired, not classified (Ret)
Red	Did not qualify (DNQ)
Red	Did not pre-qualify (DNPQ)
Black	Disqualified (DSQ)
White	Did not start (DNS)
White	Withdrew (WD)
White	Race cancelled (C)
Blank	Did not practice (DNP)
Blank	Did not arrive (DNA)
Blank	Excluded (EX)

**Bold** – Pole
Italics – Fastest Lap

Notes

† – Drivers did not finish the race, but were classified as they completed over 75% of the race distance.

=== Nations Championship ===
Pos.	Nation	CAT (Spain)		MON (Monaco)	RBR (Austria)	SIL (United Kingdom)	HUN (Hungary)	SPA (Belgium)		MNZ (Italy)	MEX (Mexico)		Points
1	Germany	**20**	**20**	**20**	18	18	**20**	16	18	9	18	18	195
2	Norway	18	18	16	12	**20**	18	**20**	**20**	14	16	16	188
3	Australia	12	16	12	**20**	10	5	10	14	**20**	**20**	**20**	159
4	Great Britain	16	14	18	9	14	16	14	0	10	14	0	125
5	Poland	14	9	10	10	12	14	12	12	12	0	8	113
6	Italy	10	0	7	14	9	12	18	8	16	0	9	103
7	Luxembourg	9	12	0	16	16	10	9	16	0	0	0	88
8	Kuwait	8	0	14	6	7	0	8	10	18	2	10	83
9	Sweden	6	10	0	7	8	9	5	6	4	6	0	61
10	Oman	3	6	0	5	6	8	3	5	8	5	4	53
11	France	7	8	9	8	5	4	6	0	5	0	0	52
12	Denmark	5	7	8	3	0	2	7	9	6	0	5	42
13	Netherlands	4	0	5	2	3	6	4	0	7	0	0	31
14	Switzerland	0	4	6	4	4	7	0	0	0	0	0	25
15	Mexico	2	5	0	1	2	3	2	7	3	0	0	25
16	Ireland	0	0	0	0	0	0	0	0	0	0	0	0
Pos.	Nation	CAT (Spain)		MON (Monaco)	RBR (Austria)	SIL (United Kingdom)	HUN (Hungary)	SPA (Belgium)		MNZ (Italy)	MEX (Mexico)		Points

- Winners in bold
