= 2018 Porsche Supercup =

26th Porsche Supercup season

The 2018 Porsche Mobil 1 Supercup was the 26th Porsche Supercup season, a GT3 production stock car racing series sanctioned by Porsche Motorsports GmbH in the world. It began on 13 May at Circuit de Catalunya and ended on 28 October at Autódromo Hermanos Rodríguez, after ten scheduled races, all of which were support events for the 2018 Formula One season.

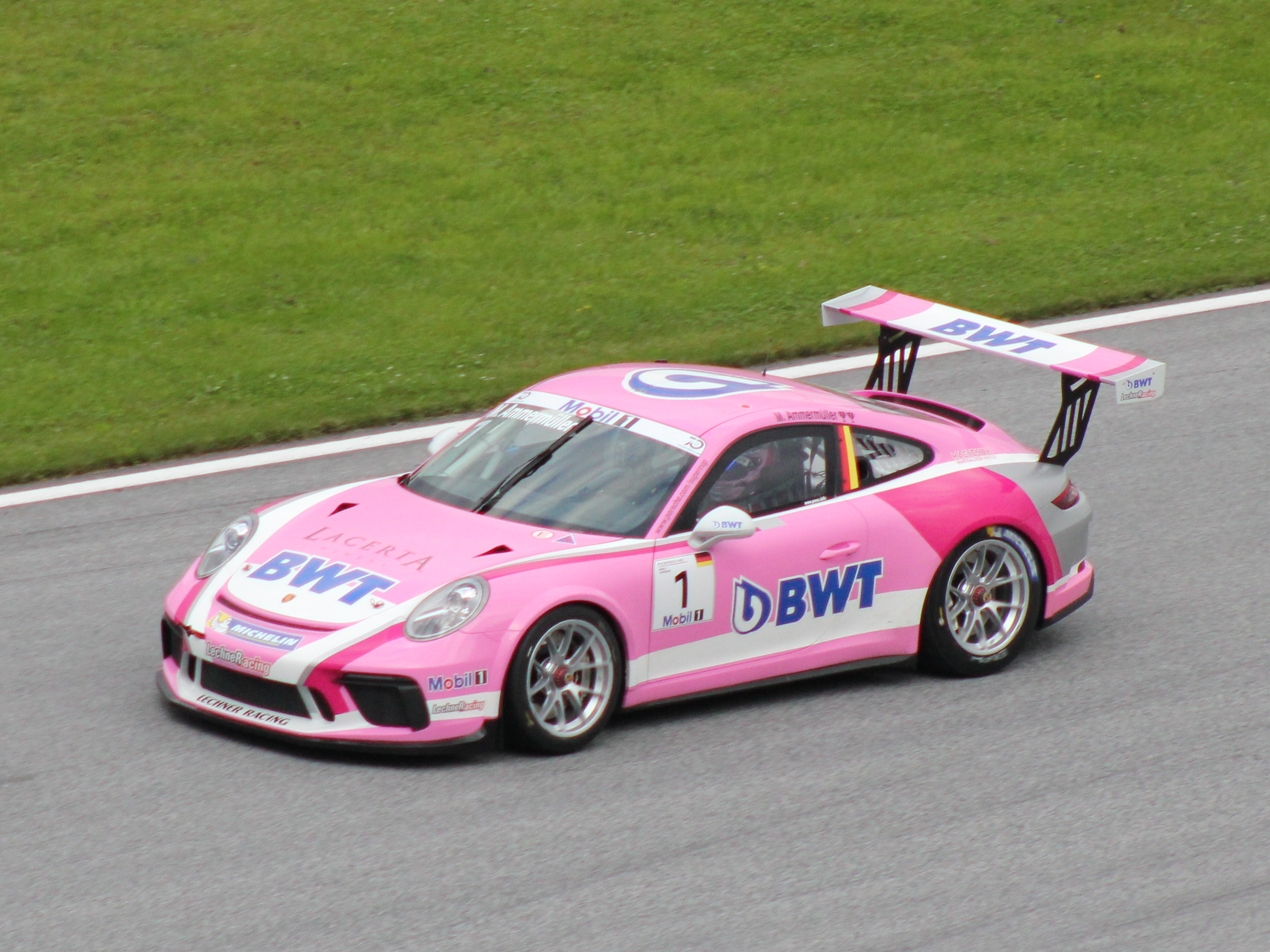
Lechner Racing's Michael Ammermüller successfully defended his Drivers' Championship title

== Teams and drivers ==
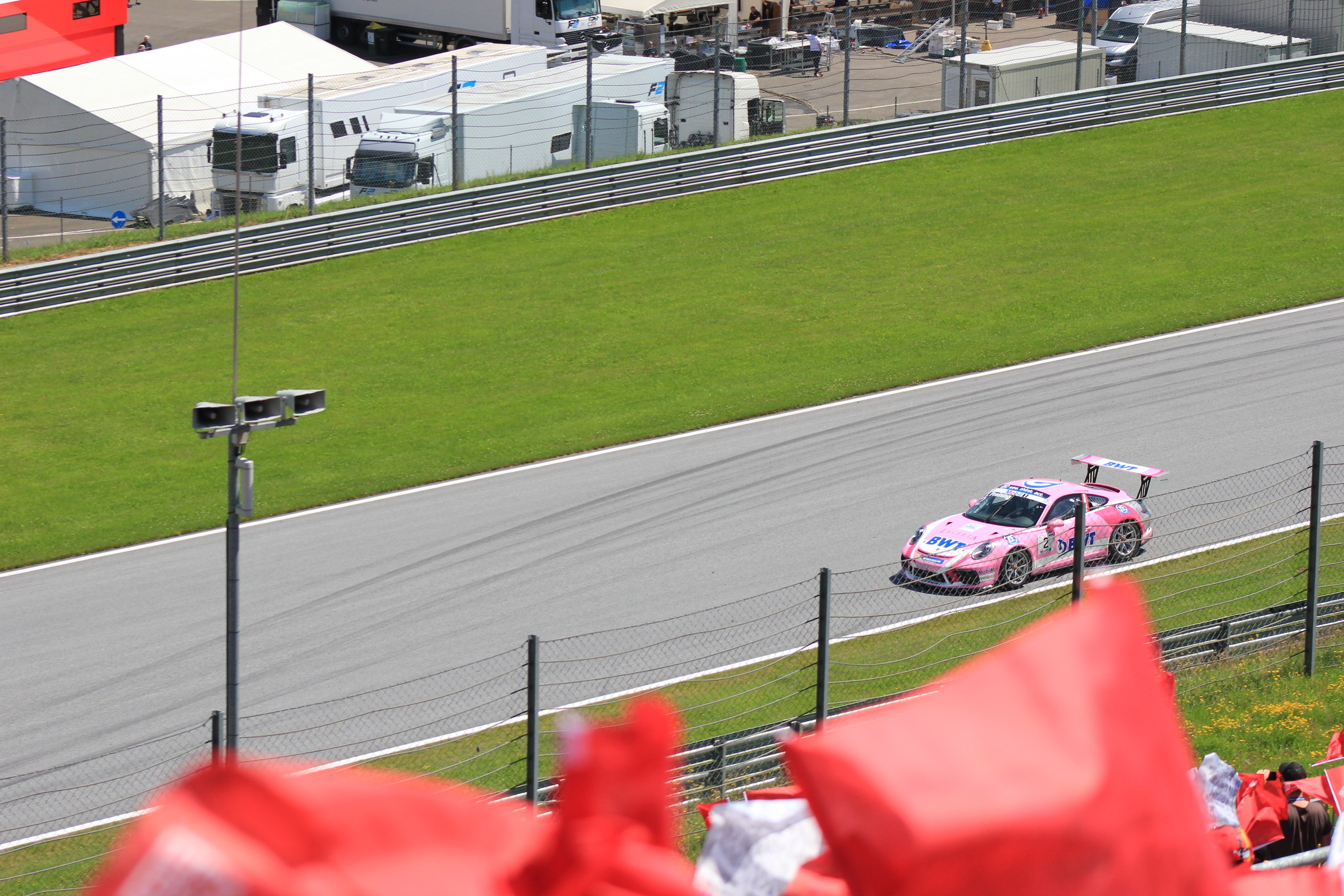
Thomas Preining after his victory at the Red Bull Ring.

Entry list was announced on 3 May 2018:

Team	No.	Drivers	Rounds
(Austria) BWT Lechner Racing	1	(Germany) Michael Ammermüller	All
(Austria) BWT Lechner Racing	2	(Austria) Thomas Preining	All
(Austria) BWT Lechner Racing	40	(United Kingdom) Dino Zamparelli	4
(United States) Momo Megatron Lechner Racing Team	3	(Luxembourg) Dylan Pereira	All
(United States) Momo Megatron Lechner Racing Team	4	(United Kingdom) Josh Webster	All
(United States) Momo Megatron Lechner Racing Team	30	(Germany) Philip Hamprecht	3
(United States) Momo Megatron Lechner Racing Team	30	(France) Jean-Baptiste Simmenauer	4
(Switzerland) Fach Auto Tech	5	(Netherlands) Jaap van Lagen	All
(Switzerland) Fach Auto Tech	6	(United Kingdom) Nick Yelloly	All
(Switzerland) Fach Auto Tech	7	(Germany) Christof Langer	1–8
(Switzerland) Fach Auto Tech	7	(Canada) Roman De Angelis	9-10
(Bahrain) Lechner Racing Middle East	8	(Oman) Al Faisal Al Zubair	1-8
(Bahrain) Lechner Racing Middle East	9	(Norway) Roar Lindland	All
(Bahrain) Lechner Racing Middle East	29	(Germany) Philip Hamprecht	1, 9-10
(Bahrain) Lechner Racing Middle East	29	(Sweden) Magnus Öhman	2
(Bahrain) Lechner Racing Middle East	29	(Oman) Khalid Al Wahaibi	3-7
(Bahrain) Lechner Racing Middle East	29	(Poland) Igor Waliłko	8
(Bahrain) Lechner Racing Middle East	30	(Netherlands) Charlie Frijns	7
(Italy) Dinamic Motorsport	10	(Italy) Mattia Drudi	All
(Italy) Dinamic Motorsport	11	(Italy) Ronnie Valori	1
(Italy) Dinamic Motorsport	11	(Italy) Gianmarco Quaresmini	2, 4-10
(Italy) Dinamic Motorsport	11	(Italy) Alessio Rovera	3
(Italy) Dinamic Motorsport	12	(Italy) Alberto Cerqui	1-8
(Germany) MRS GT-Racing	14	(Denmark) Mikkel O. Pedersen	All
(Germany) MRS GT-Racing	15	(Kuwait) Zaid Ashkanani	All
(Germany) MRS GT-Racing	28	(Argentina) Pablo Otero	1-2, 7, 9-10
(Germany) MRS GT-Racing	28	(Norway) Marius Nakken	3–5, 8
(Germany) MRS GT-Racing	28	(Austria) Christopher Zöchling	6
(Germany) MRS GT-Racing	41	(Japan) Kenji Kobayashi	5
(Germany) MRS Cup-Racing	16	(United States) Richard Heistand	All
(Germany) MRS Cup-Racing	17	(Singapore) Yuey Tan	1–4
(Germany) MRS Cup-Racing	17	(Belgium) Glenn Van Parijs	5, 7-10
(Germany) MRS Cup-Racing	18	(Austria) Philipp Sager	All
(France) Martinet by Alméras	19	(France) Julien Andlauer	All
(France) Martinet by Alméras	20	(France) Florian Latorre	All
(France) Martinet by Alméras	32	(France) Victor Blugeon	7
(France) Pierre Martinet by Alméras	21	(France) Nicolas Misslin	All
(France) Pierre Martinet by Alméras	22	(France) Stephane Denoual	1, 7
(France) Pierre Martinet by Alméras	22	(Australia) Stephen Grove	2, 5-6
(France) Pierre Martinet by Alméras	22	(France) Hugo Chevalier	3–4
(France) Pierre Martinet by Alméras	22	(France) Roland Bervillé	8-10
(Germany) Team Project 1	23	(Netherlands) Larry ten Voorde	All
(Germany) Team Project 1	24	(Netherlands) Egidio Perfetti	1–2
(Germany) Team Project 1	24	(United States) Michael de Quesada	3, 7, 9-10
(Germany) Team Project 1	24	(United States) Jake Eidson	4-5, 8
(Germany) Team Project 1	25	(Sweden) Gustav Malja	All
(United Kingdom) IDL Racing	26	(United Kingdom) Tom Sharp	All
(United Kingdom) IDL Racing	27	(United Kingdom) Mark Radcliffe	All
(France) RMS	33	(Italy) Howard Blank	1, 8
(France) RMS	34	(France) Yannick Mallegol	1, 8
(France) RMS	47	(Monaco) Fabrice Notari	8
(Austria) MSG Huber Racing	36	(Austria) Luca Rettenbacher	3
(Austria) MSG Huber Racing	37	(Poland) Igor Waliłko	3, 5
(Austria) MSG Huber Racing	44	(Sweden) Henrik Skoog	5
(United Kingdom) JTR	38	(United Kingdom) Lewis Plato	4
(United Kingdom) JTR	39	(United Kingdom) Tom Wrigley	4
(Poland) FÖRCH RACING	42	(Hungary) György Lekeny	6
(Poland) FÖRCH RACING	43	(Germany) Chris Bauer	6
(Netherlands) GP Elite	45	(Netherlands) Jesse Van Kuijk	7
(Netherlands) GP Elite	46	(Netherlands) Ziad Geris	7
(Austria) Dr. Ing h. c. F. Porsche AG	911	(Austria) Matthias Walkner	3
(Austria) Dr. Ing h. c. F. Porsche AG	911	(United Kingdom) Chris Harris	4
(Austria) Dr. Ing h. c. F. Porsche AG	911	(Sweden) Felix Rosenqvist	7

== Race calendar and results ==
Round	Circuit	Date	Pole position	Fastest lap	Winning driver	Winning team	Report
1	(Spain) Circuit de Catalunya, Barcelona	13 May	(Germany) Michael Ammermüller	(Germany) Michael Ammermüller	(Germany) Michael Ammermüller	(Austria) BWT Lechner Racing	Report
2	Circuit de Monaco, Monte Carlo	27 May	(United Kingdom) Nick Yelloly	(Germany) Michael Ammermüller	(United Kingdom) Nick Yelloly	(Switzerland) Fach Auto Tech	Report
3	(Austria) Red Bull Ring, Spielberg	1 July	(Austria) Thomas Preining	(Luxembourg) Dylan Pereira	(Austria) Thomas Preining	(Austria) BWT Lechner Racing	Report
4	(United Kingdom) Silverstone Circuit, Silverstone	8 July	(France) Florian Latorre	(Germany) Michael Ammermüller	(France) Florian Latorre	(France) Pierre Martinet by Alméras	Report
5	(Germany) Hockenheimring, Baden-Württemberg	22 July	(United Kingdom) Nick Yelloly	(United Kingdom) Nick Yelloly	(United Kingdom) Nick Yelloly	(Switzerland) Fach Auto Tech	Report
6	(Hungary) Hungaroring, Budapest	29 July	(Austria) Thomas Preining	(Austria) Thomas Preining	(Austria) Thomas Preining	(Austria) BWT Lechner Racing	Report
7	(Belgium) Circuit de Spa-Francorchamps, Stavelot	26 August	(Austria) Thomas Preining	(Austria) Thomas Preining	(Austria) Thomas Preining	(Austria) BWT Lechner Racing	Report
8	(Italy) Autodromo Nazionale Monza, Monza	2 September	(Germany) Michael Ammermüller	(Luxembourg) Dylan Pereira	(Austria) Thomas Preining	(Austria) BWT Lechner Racing	Report
9	Autódromo Hermanos Rodríguez, Mexico City	27 October	(Germany) Michael Ammermüller	(United Kingdom) Nick Yelloly	(France) Julien Andlauer	(France) Martinet by Alméras	Report
10	Autódromo Hermanos Rodríguez, Mexico City	28 October	(Germany) Michael Ammermüller	(Austria) Thomas Preining	(France) Julien Andlauer	(France) Martinet by Alméras	Report

== Championship standings ==
=== Drivers' Championship ===
Pos.	Driver	CAT (Spain)	MON (Monaco)	RBR (Austria)	SIL (United Kingdom)	HOC (Germany)	HUN (Hungary)	SPA (Belgium)	MNZ (Italy)	MEX (Mexico)		Points
1	(Germany) Michael Ammermüller	**1**	2	7	2	3	6	6	**2**	**2**	**3**	153
2	(United Kingdom) Nick Yelloly	5	**1**	5	5	**1**	5	5	4	4	2	146
3	(Austria) Thomas Preining	Ret	14	**1**	8	4	**1**	**1**	1	3	4	135
4	(France) Julien Andlauer	4	10	2	Ret	7	2	4	8	1	1	127
5	(Italy) Mattia Drudi	10	7	9	3	2	11	3	3	8	8	109
6	(France) Florian Latorre	14	11	3	**1**	12	10	8	7	6	7	90
7	(Luxembourg) Dylan Pereira	3	3	4	Ret	5	9	Ret	5	10	9	90
8	(Netherlands) Jaap van Lagen	2	4	16	Ret	13	3	7	6	5	12	89
9	(Kuwait) Zaid Ashkanani	Ret	6	6	6	8	4	2	18	16	5	83
10	(Netherlands) Larry ten Voorde	6	9	8	4	9	8	10	28†	7	6	80
11	(Denmark) Mikkel O. Pedersen	12	5	20	16	6	14	15	27†	Ret	10	39
12	(United Kingdom) Josh Webster	9	8	15	9	19	13	12	25†	Ret	11	39
13	(Italy) Alberto Cerqui	8	15	10	12	20	16	13	9			32
14	(Sweden) Gustav Malja	15	13	13	17	11	15	16	26†	9	18	26
15	(Germany) Philip Hamprecht	7		28						11	13	17
16	(Oman) Al Faisal Al Zubair	13	12	18	27	17	12	14	16			15
17	(United Kingdom) Tom Sharp	11	Ret	24	13	22	17	Ret	29†	18	17	10
18	(Belgium) Glenn van Parijs					15		17	11	15	16	10
19	(United States) Michael de Quesada			21				11		13	15	10
20	(Austria) Christopher Zöchling						7					9
21	(Italy) Gianmarco Quaresmini		24		Ret	18	21	20	13	12	14	9
22	(France) Hugo Chevalier			17	11							8
23	(Norway) Marius Nakken			14	18	16			Ret			7
24	(United States) Richard Heistand	17	16	22	21	23	18	18	10	19	DSQ	6
25	(United States) Jake Eidson				24	25			12			4
26	(Oman) Khalid Al Wahaibi			23	15	24	22	Ret				4
27	(Poland) Igor Waliłko			12		10			14			2
28	(Norway) Roar Lindland	16	18	Ret	19	21	19	22	15	17	22	1
29	(Netherlands) Egidio Perfetti	20	17									0
30	(United Kingdom) Mark Radcliffe	23	23	30	28	28	24	24	17	21	21	0
31	(Italy) Ronnie Valori	18										0
32	(France) Nicolas Misslin	19	21	27	22	26	20	21	23	20	20	0
33	(Austria) Philipp Sager	Ret	20	25	25	27	27	Ret	19	22	23	0
34	(Germany) Christof Langer	21	19	31	Ret	30	25	25	21			0
35	(Italy) Alessio Rovera			19								0
36	(Singapore) Yuey Tan	22	25	26	23							0
37	(Australia) Stephen Grove		22	29		29	23					0
38	(France) Stephane Denoual	Ret						23				0
39	(Argentina) Pablo Otero	Ret	DNQ					26		24	24	0
40	(Sweden) Magnus Öhman		26									0
Guest drivers ineligible for points
-	(United Kingdom) Dino Zamparelli				7							0
-	(Sweden) Felix Rosenqvist							9				0
-	(United Kingdom) Tom Wrigley				10							0
-	(Austria) Luca Rettenbacher			11								0
-	(United Kingdom) Lewis Plato				14							0
-	(Sweden) Henrik Skoog					14						0
-	(Canada) Roman De Angelis									14	19	0
-	(Netherlands) Charlie Frijns							19				0
-	(France) Jean-Baptiste Simmenauer				20							0
-	(France) Roland Bervillé								20	23	Ret	0
-	(France) Yannick Mallegol	24							22			0
-	(Italy) Howard Blank	25							24			0
-	(United Kingdom) Chris Harris				26							0
-	(Hungary) György Lekeny						26					0
-	(Netherlands) Jesse van Kuijk							27				0
-	(Austria) Matthias Walkner			29								0
-	(Japan) Kenji Kobayashi					31						0
-	(Netherlands) Ziad Geris							Ret				0
-	(France) Victor Blugeon							Ret				0
-	(Germany) Chris Bauer						DNS					0
-	(Monaco) Fabrice Notari								DNQ			0
Pos.	Driver	CAT (Spain)	MON (Monaco)	RBR (Austria)	SIL (United Kingdom)	HOC (Germany)	HUN (Hungary)	SPA (Belgium)	MNZ (Italy)	MEX (Mexico)		Points

Colour	Result
Gold	Winner
Silver	Second place
Bronze	Third place
Green	Points classification
Blue	Non-points classification
Blue	Non-classified finish (NC)
Purple	Retired, not classified (Ret)
Red	Did not qualify (DNQ)
Red	Did not pre-qualify (DNPQ)
Black	Disqualified (DSQ)
White	Did not start (DNS)
White	Withdrew (WD)
White	Race cancelled (C)
Blank	Did not practice (DNP)
Blank	Did not arrive (DNA)
Blank	Excluded (EX)

**Bold** – Pole
Italics – Fastest Lap

Notes

† – Drivers did not finish the race, but were classified as they completed over 75% of the race distance.

^ – Drivers took part in the races with different competition numbers
