= 2022 8 Hours of Bahrain =

Sportscar race

Coordinates: 26°1′57″N 50°30′38″E

Event information
- Round 6 of 6 in the 2022 FIA World Endurance Championship
- Date: 12 November 2022
- Location: Sakhir
- Venue: Bahrain International Circuit
- Duration: 8 Hours

Results
- Laps completed: 245
- Distance (km): 1325.94
- Distance (miles): 823.935
- Hypercar

Pole position
- Time: 1:46.800
- Team: (Japan) Toyota Gazoo Racing

Winners
- Team: (Japan) Toyota Gazoo Racing
- Drivers: (United Kingdom) Mike Conway (Japan) Kamui Kobayashi (Argentina) José María López
- LMP2

Winners
- Team: (Belgium) Team WRT
- Drivers: (Netherlands) Robin Frijns (Indonesia) Sean Gelael (Germany) René Rast
- LMP2 Pro-Am

Winners
- Team: (Italy) AF Corse
- Drivers: (Denmark) Nicklas Nielsen (France) François Perrodo (Italy) Alessio Rovera
- LMGTE Pro

Winners
- Team: (Italy) AF Corse
- Drivers: (Italy) Antonio Fuoco (Spain) Miguel Molina
- LMGTE Am

Winners
- Team: (Germany) Team Project 1 AF Corse
- Drivers: (Italy) Matteo Cairoli (Switzerland) Nicolas Leutwiler (Denmark) Mikkel O. Pedersen

The 2022 8 Hours of Bahrain was an endurance sportscar racing event held on 12 November 2022, as the sixth and final round of the 2022 FIA World Endurance Championship. It was the eleventh running of the 8 Hours of Bahrain, and the fourth running in an extended 8 hours format.

== Background ==
The provisional calendar for the 2022 FIA World Endurance Championship released in August 2021. It saw a few changes, with the return of the Sebring and Fuji races, whilst the Portimao and second Bahrain races were dropped. The FIA WTCR Race of Bahrain, the penultimate round of 2022 World Touring Car Cup, was a support race for the 8 hours.

== Entry list ==
The No. 44 ARC Bratislava squad returned for the final round of the 2022 season after missing the 2022 6 Hours of Fuji. Miroslav Konopka returned as well. Konopka was joined by Mathias Beche and Richard Bradley.

After missing the Fuji race due to a clash with the 2022 DTM Spa round, René Rast returned to the No. 31 WRT car.

Nico Müller, who was originally entered with the No. 10 Vector Sport car, replaced James Rossiter in the No. 94 Peugeot 9X8 car ahead of his first full season with the team in 2023. Renger van der Zande replaced Müller in the No. 10 Vector Sport car.

Glickenhaus missed the 8 Hours of Bahrain for unknown reasons.

The No. 56 Team Project 1 Porsche 911 RSR-19 saw the departure of Ollie Millroy and Brendan Iribe, with Phillip Hyatt and Gunnar Jeannette taking over their place.

== Schedule ==
Date	Time (local: AST)	Event
Thursday, 10 November	12:15	Free Practice 1
Thursday, 10 November	17:30	Free Practice 2
Friday, 11 November	11:00	Free Practice 3
Friday, 11 November	16:50	Qualifying - LM GTE Am & Pro
Friday, 11 November	17:10	Qualifying - LMH, LMDh, LMP2
Saturday, 12 November	14:00	Race

== Free practice ==
- Only the fastest car in each class is shown.

Free Practice 1	Class	No.	Entrant	Driver	Time
Free Practice 1	HY	93	(France) Peugeot TotalEnergies	(France) Jean-Éric Vergne	1:50.536
Free Practice 1	P2	83	(Italy) AF Corse	(Denmark) Nicklas Nielsen	1:52.144
Free Practice 1	Pro	92	(Germany) Porsche GT Team	(Denmark) Michael Christensen	1:58.025
Free Practice 1	Am	56	(Germany) Team Project 1	(United Kingdom) Ben Barnicoat	1:59.636
Free Practice 2	Class	No.	Entrant	Driver	Time
Free Practice 2	HY	93	(France) Peugeot TotalEnergies	(United Kingdom) Paul di Resta	1:49.613
Free Practice 2	P2	83	(Italy) AF Corse	(Italy) Alessio Rovera	1:51.787
Free Practice 2	Pro	92	(Germany) Porsche GT Team	(Denmark) Michael Christensen	1:57.192
Free Practice 2	Am	46	(Germany) Team Project 1	(Italy) Matteo Cairoli	1:59.717
Free Practice 3	Class	No.	Entrant	Driver	Time
Free Practice 3	HY	7	(Japan) Toyota Gazoo Racing	(United Kingdom) Mike Conway	1:48.384
Free Practice 3	P2	31	(Belgium) WRT	(Netherlands) Robin Frijns	1:51.792
Free Practice 3	Pro	91	(Germany) Porsche GT Team	(Italy) Gianmaria Bruni	1:57.089
Free Practice 3	Am	46	(Germany) Team Project 1	(Switzerland) Nicolas Leutwiler	2:00.079

== Qualifying ==
Pole position winners in each class are marked in bold.

Pos	Class	No.	Team	Time	Gap	Grid
1	**Hypercar**	**8**	**(Japan) Toyota Gazoo Racing**	**1:46.800**	-	**1**
2	Hypercar	93	(France) Peugeot TotalEnergies	1:47.610	+0.810	2
3	Hypercar	7	(Japan) Toyota Gazoo Racing	1:47.738	+0.938	3
4	Hypercar	94	(France) Peugeot TotalEnergies	1:48.334	+1.534	4
5	Hypercar	36	(France) Alpine Elf Team	1:48.343	+1.543	5
6	**LMP2**	**41**	**(Switzerland) RealTeam by WRT**	**1:50.330**	**+3.530**	**6**
7	LMP2	38	(United Kingdom) JOTA	1:50.467	+3.667	7
8	LMP2	22	(United States) United Autosports USA	1:50.497	+3.697	8
9	**LMP2 Pro-Am**	**83**	**(Italy) AF Corse**	**1:50.546**	**+3.746**	**9**
10	LMP2 Pro-Am	44	(Slovakia) ARC Bratislava	1:50.619	+3.819	10
11	LMP2	23	(United States) United Autosports USA	1:50.661	+3.861	11
12	LMP2	10	(United Kingdom) Vector Sport	1:50.766	+3.966	12
13	LMP2	31	(Belgium) WRT	1:50.802	+4.002	13
14	LMP2	1	(France) Richard Mille Racing Team	1:50.857	+4.057	14
15	LMP2	9	(Italy) Prema Orlen Team	1:51.110	+4.310	15
16	LMP2 Pro-Am	45	(Portugal) Algarve Pro Racing	1:51.479	+4.679	16
17	LMP2	34	(Poland) Inter Europol Competition	1:51.661	+4.861	17
18	LMP2 Pro-Am	35	(France) Ultimate	1:51.821	+5.021	18
19	**LMGTE Pro**	**91**	**(Germany) Porsche GT Team**	**1:56.143**	**+9.343**	**19**
20	LMGTE Pro	52	(Italy) AF Corse	1:56.419	+9.619	20
21	LMGTE Pro	92	(Germany) Porsche GT Team	1:56.439	+9.639	21
22	LMGTE Pro	51	(Italy) AF Corse	1:56.472	+9.672	22
23	LMGTE Pro	64	(United States) Corvette Racing	1:57.539	+10.739	23
24	**LMGTE Am**	**85**	**(Italy) Iron Dames**	**1:59.186**	**+12.386**	**24**
25	LMP2	28	(United Kingdom) JOTA	1:59.503	+12.703	25
26	LMGTE Am	33	(United Kingdom) TF Sport	1:59.698	+12.898	26
27	LMGTE Am	77	(Germany) Dempsey-Proton Racing	1:59.708	+12.908	27
28	LMGTE Am	46	(Germany) Team Project 1	2:00.030	+13.230	28
29	LMGTE Am	54	(Italy) AF Corse	2:00.489	+13.689	29
30	LMGTE Am	86	(United Kingdom) GR Racing	2:00.597	+13.797	30
31	LMGTE Am	21	(Italy) AF Corse	2:00.715	+13.915	31
32	LMGTE Am	71	(Switzerland) Spirit of Race	2:00.733	+13.933	32
33	LMGTE Am	98	(Canada) Northwest AMR	2:01.100	+14.300	33
34	LMGTE Am	60	(Italy) Iron Lynx	2:01.303	+14.503	34
35	LMGTE Am	56	(Germany) Team Project 1	2:01.307	+14.507	35
36	LMGTE Am	88	(Germany) Dempsey-Proton Racing	2:01.361	+14.561	36
37	LMGTE Am	777	(Japan) D'Station Racing	2:01.730	+14.930	37

== Race ==
=== Race report ===
==== Hour 1 ====
The #8 of Buemi controls the start leading the way from pole, with the #93 goes for a dive around the outside of the #8 at the start, but failing to take the lead. Its sister car, the #94 has a slow start and gets jumped immediately by the #36 Alpine - which proceeds to overtake the #7 at turn 4 when it runs wide, putting itself in 3rd - but Lopez would take the #7's lost place back from the #36 with a dive at turn 1 at the start of lap 3, successfully defending its position on the following run from turn 3~4. The #22 United Autosports LMP2 would overtake the #41 off track on the first lap - resulting in a 10-second penalty an hour later.

A safety car was immediately called out due to a spin from the #77 GTEAm - at the exit of turn 10 on lap 1 - the driver only managing to get the car going after the safety car was called.

A battle between the #91 and #52 sitting in 2nd and 3rd ensues on lap7, with the Porsche of Bruni briefly pushing the #51 off at turn 6, with the latter bailing off track and ending up ahead of the #91, but would end up giving its place back later. No further action was taken after investigation.

DiResta in the #93 Peugeot starts to put on pressure to the #8 of Buemi as the LMHs come up to traffic on the Lap 9. The attacking #93 isn't exactly free of worries however, as the #7 is already tight on its tail - it's a ~1.5 second gap between each of the top 3 LMHs by lap 10, with the drivers' championship contender #36 around 2.5 seconds behind.

LMP2 title contender #41, sitting in 2nd place of its class goes for a dive on the #777 D'Station GTEAm at the final corner on lap 12, making contact and briefly taking both cars off track, lightly damaging its own bodywork in the process, Though the #777 would somehow get a warning 11 laps later for being hit from behind.

15 laps in and Ferrari seems to be struggling with its tyres, with Calado of the #51, points leader of the two Ferraris and favorite for Ferrai's title battle - now in 4th place around 6 seconds off the leader #92 - complaining on radio about the rear tyre temperatures rising. No such problem at Porsche however, with Estre reporting to be happy about the car just a few seconds later. Meanwhile, the #64 Corvette is still far off pace, trailing at the back of the GTEPro grid.

Calado would complain further more about tyres and not having enough power compared to their teammate 2 laps later; said teammate - the #52 would reignite the battle between it and the #91 Porsche, tussling for a few laps and diving down the inside of the #91 on the final corner of lap 19, successfully securing themselves a 2nd position. In hour 1 it's the supposed-to-be-supporting Ferrari in GTEPro fighting for the positions, while the title contender only being able to watch from the back.

Despite the woes Calado had a few laps earlier, his #51 Ferrari was back on the rear of the #91 Porsche on lap #23, which just lost its position to the #52 earlier. The #52 has caught up to the #92 already on lap 25 fighting for the lead, trying around the outside on the run from turn 3 to 4 but failing to take the position - but a dive down the inside at turn 9 would nail the lead down for the #52, the #91's switchback not enough for it to retake its lost place at turn 10, and Estre haing to back out of the fight, now being caught up by his teammate in the #91.

Meanwhile, the #36 Alpine pits on lap 27, changing the left hand side tyres and Vaxivere taking the place of Lapierre in the car.

==== Hour 2 ====
The next LMH to pit would be the #93 Peugeot two laps later, no driver change but filling up fuel and changing the left hand side tyres. Next up would be the #7 and #94 on lap 31, both cars taking fuel and the #7 taking left side tyres only, while the #94 takes a full set of tyres. The #8 would be the last to pit, coming out just ahead of its teammate.

The #92 pits while the #51 has engaged with the #91 in a fight for 2nd place on lap 32, with the latter coming out on top after a full lap of wheel-to-wheel battle, as the #92 goes for the pits at the end of the lap.

FCY was deployed on lap 34 for a tyre that came off the #71 GTEAm Ferrari on the entry to turn 14 - result of a contact between it and the #44 ARC Bratislava LMP2; the latter would later go into the pits for a long stop and losing 7 laps, while the #71 itself would get a drive through penalty later. The #64 Corvette - far off on pace in the first hour - takes the opportunity to pit, coming out in 2nd place right after the #51 Ferrari.

The FCY would end 3 laps later, with the #51 now 16 seconds ahead of the #64, with the rest of the field - #92 #52 and #91 all with around a 30-second gap from each other.

Menezes in the #94 Peugeot takes advantage of its full set of new tyres from the pitstop earlier - passing the #36 on the final corner of lap 41 and taking 4th position. The running in LMH would be the Toyotas - 8 leading the 7 by 1.5 seconds, which in turn in 12 seconds ahead of the two Peugeots, 10 seconds apart and the #36 in last place, 7 seconds behind the previous car.

Meanwhile, Fuoco piloting the #52 has successfully managed to pass Estre in the #92, Ferrari now leading both the manufacturers' and drivers' title with the two Porsches now last in GTEPro, 6 hours and 30 minutes to go.

A brief yellow flag would be called on lap 48, as the #86 GTEAm Porsche - in the middle of a 3-way fight for 3rd in GTEAm - and #1 LMP2 comes into contact at turn 9, the latter being spun and the former earning a drive through penalty later. The trio of #56, #86 and #46 would stick together in that formation for almost half an hour, with the #46 making moves on lap 56~58, passing first the #86 and #56 for a 3rd place in class.

6 minutes to the 6 hour mark and the Alpine comes into the pits for a second time, with Negrao now taking the wheel.

3 minutes to the 6 hour mark and Peugeot falls victim to their constant reliability issue streak again. The #93 grinds to a halt at turn 1 of lap 59, with DiResta stating on the radio that "the gearbox is completely broken". The second FCY of the race was called on lap 60, but the #93 manages to get going again right after FCY period started, returning to the pits - DiResta gets out of the car for a driver change, while the car itself goes into the garage.

==== Hour 3 ====
In GTEPro, the #64, #52 and #91 takes to the pits during this FCY period; The two Toyotas pit on lap 61, with the #94 Peugeot coming in right after - but it wouldn't manage to complete its out lap without interruptions, the car almost spinning on the exit of turn 1 and then stopping on the run from turn 3~4; but the car would get going again after a power cycle, with the green flag dropping again shortly after.

The #93 Peugeot of Vergne would come out of the garage around 10 minutes after it went in, setting the then-fastest lap of the race of 1:49.709. In GTEPro it's the #64, #92 and #52 all within a second, with the #51 Ferrari comfortably leading by around 30 seconds. Despite their pace deficit in the first hour, Corvette is now fending off the #92 nicely, as the #52 takes the chance and tussles with the #92 on turn 1 of lap 66, even running wide off track at turn 2, and eventually taking its place in 3rd - this incident would be under investigation by the stewards, though no further action would end up being taken. All the while, Tandy runs away slightly in front with the #64, pulling out a gap of around 2 seconds.

By lap 69 the #52 has almost caught up to the #64, reducing the gap between them to .5 seconds - but wouldn't make the pass happen until turn 7 of lap 80, making it a Ferrari 1–2 in GTEPro - albeit separated by 30 seconds. In LMH the #7 of Conway has now caught up to the #8 of Hartley as they start to run into traffic, the duo now coming up behind the #36, almost about to lap their drivers' title rivals.

The Alpine pits again at 6 minutes to the 5 hour mark; while Hartley reports on the radio that the #8 is experiencing "downshifting issues" - though the issue wouldn't cause much trouble for the crew later in the race. Meanwhile, in LMP2, the championship leading #38 Jota is chasing down the #9 Prema for 6th place, with a 0.5 second gap separating them - while the sister #28 Jota sits in 5th place.

==== Hour 4 ====
5 minutes after the 5 hour mark has passed, the #7 and #93 comes into the pits on lap 92, followed by the #94 and #8; the Toyotas are still only separated by a .4 second gap, with the next LMH - the #94 being more than a minute behind. Conway in the #7 expresses frustration over the radio of being stuck behind his teammate, the championship leading #8 - which would eventually give its position to the #7 on the back straight of lap 95, Conway soon pulling out a gap of ~1.6 seconds over the next two laps.

By the 4h20m mark, the #64 would make a dive and pass the #92 at turn 8 for 3rd place; as Christensen was being informed on the radio that the Corvette was able to pass them with their fresh tyres. Meanwhile, the #94 would pit on lap 113, with Muller handing the wheel to Duval. The next LMH to pit would be the #36 on lap 115, Lapierre back behind the wheel of the car.

With 4 minutes to go until the 4 hour mark, the #94 of Duval comes to a stop on turn 1 of lap 119 - the car would get going relatively quickly after a reset, but it wouldn't be free of all issues, going into the garage immediately on the same lap. The #36 Alpine moves up into 3rd place, although it's still 2 laps down to the closest Toyota.

==== Hour 5 ====
The two championship title rivals of GTEAm - #98 of Dalla Lana and #33 of Chaves would engage in a fight for 2nd in class - and 1st the championship right after the 4 hour mark, with the #33 passing the #98 to come out on top. The #7 and #8 pits on lap 124 and 125 respectively, with Kobayashi and Hirakawa taking their respective places in the cars.

An FCY was called at the 3h50m mark due to debris at turn 1 from the #28 Jota colliding with the #56 GTEAm Project1 Porsche - the former receiving a drive through penalty for the incident later; the #33 that gained its position over the #98 in GTEAm earlier would just miss out on a FCY pit stop, which ended up in them losing out to their rival again, dropping back by some 40 seconds after the FCY period, though still in the top spot for the class championship. The #36 pits under FCY, being the only LMH to do so and gained nearly a lap over the Toyotas which did their stops before the FCY - though they're still a lap behind after the FCY period has ended.

In GTEPro, The Ferraris takes advantage of the situation, pitting right during FCY on lap 127, followed by the #64 and the #91; The #92 Porsche would again lose out on luck, being the only car in GTEPro that has done their last pitstop before the FCY. With 3 hours and 30 minutes to go, the GTEPro field would be evenly spread, with the Ferrari duo leading the Corvette leading the Porsches, all cars separated from each other by around 25 seconds.

==== Hour 6 ====
8 minutes past the 3 hour mark, and it's the #93 and #94 that pits in LMH, the latter still 2 laps behind its teammate - and almost jumped the gun (despite being given the clear to go) while the car was still connected in the box, with a mechanic having to change another tyre. Next up being the #36 Alpine coming in on lap 156, and finally the two Toyotas on lap 157; last in its class, #92 was the first to pit in GTEPro on lap 154, a good 6 laps ahead of the next GTEPro that came into the pits for its 5th stop - the #52 Ferrari, then the #64 and #51 that came in 2 laps after the #52. The 91 rounds up the 5th pit cycle for the GTEPros, being the last to pit on lap 164.

Meanwhile, in LMP2, Kubica in the #9 Prema was being chased down by Jarvis in the #23 United car for 2nd place, with the #31 WRT 35 seconds in the lead. On lap 162, Kubica makes a mistake and runs wide off the track on the exit of turn 10, giving Jarvis the opportunity to make the pass on the following corner.

With 2 hours and 20 minutes to go, the #94 Peugeot has finally caught back up to the rear of the LMH field, 7 laps behind the race leading Toyota #7 of Kobayashi, who's 30 seconds in front of his teammate in the #8 car.

On lap 173, the #34 Inter Europol car of Brundle was spun on the exit of turn 8, coming into contact with the class leading #31 WRT car, with the #45 APR of James Allen spinning in avoidance right behind the incident. The #31 would catch a 1-minute stop and go penalty later on. Meanwhile, the #22 United car of Owen, coming out of the pits, manages to just undercut the #9 Prema and make a pass for 3rd place.

With 2 hours and 10 minutes to go, the #93 Peugeot was back in the garage again with a broken 4th gear, now taking the place of the #94 as the last car in the LMH class.

5 minutes to the 2 hour remaining mark and the two leading Ferraris in GTEPro switch positions on lap 179, with the #52 now in front of their championship leading teammates in the #51.

==== Hour 7 ====
The #38 of Stevens makes a move on the #9 of Colombo at turn 1 of lap 181, moving up to 4th place in class and very shortly catching up to the back of the 3rd place #22 United car of Owen, while the #36 Alpine comes into the pits with 1h55m to go, followed next by the #94.

Owen makes a mistake and runs slightly wide at turn 6 of lap 185, and Stevens takes the opportunity to make the pass at turn 8 on lap 185, moving up to a podium position and further extending their lead in the teams' championship to their closest rival, the currently class-leading #31 WRT.

With 1h50m to go, the #93 Peugeot is officially out of the race. Meanwhile, in LMH, The 8 pits on lap 187 with Buemi back in the car, taking over from Hirakawa. Next to pit would be the #7.

On lap 188, the championship leading #51 Ferrari in GTEPro had run into serious issues. Calado reports on the radio that "something's touching the ground" and that the car "revs freely in 4th gear". The #51, 2nd in class, lost 7 seconds to the leading Porsche #91 in the following two laps, now only ~50 seconds ahead of the 4th place #91 and 31 seconds ahead of the 3rd placed #64. On lap 191, Calado reports over the radio that there's issues with "gearbox oil", while the #64 of Tandy is catching rapidly behind.

By lap 193, the #51 had lost its position to both the #64 and #91, with Calado going off the racing line multiple times in order to maintain the revs after losing 4th gear. Both Ferraris would pit on lap 194, with the #64 and #91 temporarily moving into 1st and 2nd - and the #52 being in the net lead of GTEPro having done one more stop than the #64 and #91. The #51 would be sent out of the pits without any repairs, now second to last and around 35 seconds ahead of the last place #92 Porsche.

The #52 passes the #91 on track at turn 10 of lap 197, moving into 2nd place in class; the latter would pit on lap 198, with the #64 rounding up the 6th pit cycle for GTEPro on lap 199. The #91 would take 3rd from the #51 on the turn 13~14 straight on lap 199, with Pier Guidi now having to focus on nursing the #51 to the chequered flag without a 4th gear.

By lap 202 and with an hour and twenty minutes to go, the #51 has been overtaken by the #92, dropping to last in class and slowing down to +8 seconds per lap from the other cars in class. In GTEPro, it's #52 leading the #64 by a minute, which in turn leads the #91 by 12 seconds. Despite the issues for the #51 of Pier Guidi and Calado, they still lead the drivers' championship by 4 points to their teammates in the #52, and Ferrari still lead the GTE manufacturers' championship to Porsche by 13 points.

With an hour and 8 minutes to go, the #46 Project 1 Porsche is now in the lead of the GTEAm class, taking over from the #85 Iron Dames Ferrari that has stayed there for the past few hours. The #51 of Pier Guidi has been warned for abusing track limits on lap 210 - a result of the car being affected under braking due to having to downshift directly from 5th to 3rd.

The #36 Alpine pits on lap 211 with an hour and 3 minutes to go, with Lapierre taking over from Vaxivere.

==== Hour 8 ====
58 minutes to go and the #91 pits, followed by the #52; the order in GTEPro remains unchanged, with the #52 leading the #62 leading the two Porsches, and the #51 trailing behind. The Toyotas have controlled the race in LMH, with a stable gap of around 40 seconds dividing the #7 and #8 for the past hour; both cars would pit for the final time with 48 minutes remaining, with Conway and Hartley taking over from Lopez and Buemi respectively.

On lap 222 with 41 minutes left, the #38 Jota of Da Costa passes the #22 United at turn 9 for 4th place in LMP2, even squeezing the latter off track on the exit of turn 10; on lap 224, the #54 GTEAm Ferrari of Cassidy locked up the rears at turn 1, spinning into the #35 Ultimate LMP2 and making slight contact; no further action was taken for the incident. With 11 minutes to go, the #54 would spin again at the same place in the same fashion, this time making contact with the #77 Proton Porsche.

With 19 minutes to go, the #38 Jota and #22 United comes in for a fuel stop, followed by the class leading #31 two and a half minutes later. The #56 Project 1 Porsche would overtake the #85 Iron Dames at turn 4 of lap 239 with 10 minutes to go, making it a 1-2 for Team Project 1 in GTEAm. Prema would finally come into the pits with only 5 minutes remaining, the #9 losing 3rd place to the championship leading #38.

On the very last lap, the #91 Porsche comes into the pits, giving its 3rd place to the #92 car - which would allow them to move up to 2nd place in the drivers' championship, ahead of the #52 Ferrari duo. The #7 Toyota crosses the line with 245 laps clocked, their championship winning teammate finishing 45 seconds later. The #31 WRT wins the LMP2 class with a comfortable 50 second lead to the #23 United car, with the championship winning #38 Jota finishing in 3rd. The GTEPro drivers' champion #51 limps across the line after nearly two hours on track with a broken gearbox, while its teammate takes the win for the final race of the GTEPro class and claiming the manufacturers' title for Ferrari. Team Project 1 takes the top two spots of the GTEAm podium, with the #85 Iron Dames rounding up the podium, just ahead of class champion - the #33 TF Sport Aston Martin that finished in 4th place.

=== Race result ===
The minimum number of laps for classification (70% of overall winning car's distance) was 172 laps. Class winners are in bold and ‡.

Pos	Class	No	Team	Drivers	Chassis	Tyre	Laps	Time/Retired
Pos	Class	No	Team	Drivers	Engine	Tyre	Laps	Time/Retired
1	**Hypercar**	**7**	**(Japan) Toyota Gazoo Racing**	**(United Kingdom) Mike Conway (Japan) Kamui Kobayashi (Argentina) José María López**	**Toyota GR010 Hybrid**	MI	**245**	**8:00:40.920‡**
1	**Hypercar**	**7**	**(Japan) Toyota Gazoo Racing**	**(United Kingdom) Mike Conway (Japan) Kamui Kobayashi (Argentina) José María López**	**Toyota H8909 3.5 L Turbo V6**	MI	**245**	**8:00:40.920‡**
2	Hypercar	8	(Japan) Toyota Gazoo Racing	(Switzerland) Sébastien Buemi (New Zealand) Brendon Hartley (Japan) Ryō Hirakawa	Toyota GR010 Hybrid	MI	245	+45.471
2	Hypercar	8	(Japan) Toyota Gazoo Racing	(Switzerland) Sébastien Buemi (New Zealand) Brendon Hartley (Japan) Ryō Hirakawa	Toyota H8909 3.5 L Turbo V6	MI	245	+45.471
3	Hypercar	36	(France) Alpine Elf Team	(France) Nicolas Lapierre (Brazil) André Negrão (France) Matthieu Vaxivière	Alpine A480	MI	243	+2 Laps
3	Hypercar	36	(France) Alpine Elf Team	(France) Nicolas Lapierre (Brazil) André Negrão (France) Matthieu Vaxivière	Gibson GL458 4.5 L V8	MI	243	+2 Laps
4	Hypercar	94	(France) Peugeot TotalEnergies	(France) Loïc Duval (United States) Gustavo Menezes (Switzerland) Nico Müller	Peugeot 9X8	MI	239	+6 Laps
4	Hypercar	94	(France) Peugeot TotalEnergies	(France) Loïc Duval (United States) Gustavo Menezes (Switzerland) Nico Müller	Peugeot X6H 2.6 L Turbo V6	MI	239	+6 Laps
5	**LMP2**	**31**	**(Belgium) WRT**	**(Netherlands) Robin Frijns (Indonesia) Sean Gelael (Germany) René Rast**	**Oreca 07**	G	**237**	**+8 Laps‡**
5	**LMP2**	**31**	**(Belgium) WRT**	**(Netherlands) Robin Frijns (Indonesia) Sean Gelael (Germany) René Rast**	Gibson GK428 4.2 L V8	G	**237**	**+8 Laps‡**
6	LMP2	23	(United States) United Autosports USA	(United Kingdom) Oliver Jarvis (United Kingdom) Alex Lynn (United States) Josh Pierson	Oreca 07	G	237	+8 Laps
6	LMP2	23	(United States) United Autosports USA	(United Kingdom) Oliver Jarvis (United Kingdom) Alex Lynn (United States) Josh Pierson	Gibson GK428 4.2 L V8	G	237	+8 Laps
7	LMP2	38	(United Kingdom) JOTA	(Portugal) António Félix da Costa (Mexico) Roberto González (United Kingdom) Will Stevens	Oreca 07	G	236	+9 Laps
7	LMP2	38	(United Kingdom) JOTA	(Portugal) António Félix da Costa (Mexico) Roberto González (United Kingdom) Will Stevens	Gibson GK428 4.2 L V8	G	236	+9 Laps
8	LMP2	9	(Italy) Prema Orlen Team	(Italy) Lorenzo Colombo (Switzerland) Louis Delétraz (Poland) Robert Kubica	Oreca 07	G	236	+9 Laps
8	LMP2	9	(Italy) Prema Orlen Team	(Italy) Lorenzo Colombo (Switzerland) Louis Delétraz (Poland) Robert Kubica	Gibson GK428 4.2 L V8	G	236	+9 Laps
9	LMP2	41	(Switzerland) RealTeam by WRT	(Portugal) Rui Andrade (Austria) Ferdinand Habsburg (France) Norman Nato	Oreca 07	G	236	+9 Laps
9	LMP2	41	(Switzerland) RealTeam by WRT	(Portugal) Rui Andrade (Austria) Ferdinand Habsburg (France) Norman Nato	Gibson GK428 4.2 L V8	G	236	+9 Laps
10	LMP2	22	(United States) United Autosports USA	(Portugal) Filipe Albuquerque (United Kingdom) Philip Hanson (United States) Will Owen	Oreca 07	G	236	+9 Laps
10	LMP2	22	(United States) United Autosports USA	(Portugal) Filipe Albuquerque (United Kingdom) Philip Hanson (United States) Will Owen	Gibson GK428 4.2 L V8	G	236	+9 Laps
11	LMP2	28	(United Kingdom) JOTA	(South Africa) Jonathan Aberdein (United Arab Emirates) Ed Jones (Denmark) Oliver Rasmussen	Oreca 07	G	236	+9 Laps
11	LMP2	28	(United Kingdom) JOTA	(South Africa) Jonathan Aberdein (United Arab Emirates) Ed Jones (Denmark) Oliver Rasmussen	Gibson GK428 4.2 L V8	G	236	+9 Laps
12	LMP2	1	(France) Richard Mille Racing Team	(France) Paul-Loup Chatin (France) Charles Milesi (France) Lilou Wadoux	Oreca 07	G	235	+10 Laps
12	LMP2	1	(France) Richard Mille Racing Team	(France) Paul-Loup Chatin (France) Charles Milesi (France) Lilou Wadoux	Gibson GK428 4.2 L V8	G	235	+10 Laps
13	LMP2	10	(United Kingdom) Vector Sport	(France) Sébastien Bourdais (Republic of Ireland) Ryan Cullen (Netherlands) Renger van der Zande	Oreca 07	G	235	+10 Laps
13	LMP2	10	(United Kingdom) Vector Sport	(France) Sébastien Bourdais (Republic of Ireland) Ryan Cullen (Netherlands) Renger van der Zande	Gibson GK428 4.2 L V8	G	235	+10 Laps
14	**LMP2 (Pro-Am)**	**83**	**(Italy) AF Corse**	**(Denmark) Nicklas Nielsen (France) François Perrodo (Italy) Alessio Rovera**	**Oreca 07**	G	**235**	**+10 Laps‡**
14	**LMP2 (Pro-Am)**	**83**	**(Italy) AF Corse**	**(Denmark) Nicklas Nielsen (France) François Perrodo (Italy) Alessio Rovera**	Gibson GK428 4.2 L V8	G	**235**	**+10 Laps‡**
15	LMP2 (Pro-Am)	35	(France) Ultimate	(France) François Heriau (France) Jean-Baptiste Lahaye (France) Matthieu Lahaye	Oreca 07	G	235	+10 Laps
15	LMP2 (Pro-Am)	35	(France) Ultimate	(France) François Heriau (France) Jean-Baptiste Lahaye (France) Matthieu Lahaye	Gibson GK428 4.2 L V8	G	235	+10 Laps
16	LMP2 (Pro-Am)	45	(Portugal) Algarve Pro Racing	(Australia) James Allen (Austria) René Binder (United States) Steven Thomas	Oreca 07	G	235	+10 Laps
16	LMP2 (Pro-Am)	45	(Portugal) Algarve Pro Racing	(Australia) James Allen (Austria) René Binder (United States) Steven Thomas	Gibson GK428 4.2 L V8	G	235	+10 Laps
17	**LMGTE Pro**	**52**	**(Italy) AF Corse**	**(Italy) Antonio Fuoco (Spain) Miguel Molina**	**Ferrari 488 GTE Evo**	MI	**231**	**+14 Laps‡**
17	**LMGTE Pro**	**52**	**(Italy) AF Corse**	**(Italy) Antonio Fuoco (Spain) Miguel Molina**	Ferrari F154CB 3.9 L Turbo V8	MI	**231**	**+14 Laps‡**
18	LMGTE Pro	64	(United States) Corvette Racing	(United States) Tommy Milner (United Kingdom) Nick Tandy	Chevrolet Corvette C8.R	MI	230	+15 Laps
18	LMGTE Pro	64	(United States) Corvette Racing	(United States) Tommy Milner (United Kingdom) Nick Tandy	Chevrolet 5.5 L V8	MI	230	+15 Laps
19	LMGTE Pro	92	(Germany) Porsche GT Team	(Denmark) Michael Christensen (France) Kévin Estre	Porsche 911 RSR-19	MI	230	+15 Laps
19	LMGTE Pro	92	(Germany) Porsche GT Team	(Denmark) Michael Christensen (France) Kévin Estre	Porsche 4.2 L Flat-6	MI	230	+15 Laps
20	LMGTE Pro	91	(Germany) Porsche GT Team	(Italy) Gianmaria Bruni (Austria) Richard Lietz	Porsche 911 RSR-19	MI	230	+15 Laps
20	LMGTE Pro	91	(Germany) Porsche GT Team	(Italy) Gianmaria Bruni (Austria) Richard Lietz	Porsche 4.2 L Flat-6	MI	230	+15 Laps
21	LMGTE Pro	51	(Italy) AF Corse	(United Kingdom) James Calado (Italy) Alessandro Pier Guidi	Ferrari 488 GTE Evo	MI	227	+18 Laps
21	LMGTE Pro	51	(Italy) AF Corse	(United Kingdom) James Calado (Italy) Alessandro Pier Guidi	Ferrari F154CB 3.9 L Turbo V8	MI	227	+18 Laps
22	LMP2 (Pro-Am)	44	(Slovakia) ARC Bratislava	(Switzerland) Mathias Beche (United Kingdom) Richard Bradley (Slovakia) Miroslav Konôpka	Oreca 07	G	227	+18 Laps
22	LMP2 (Pro-Am)	44	(Slovakia) ARC Bratislava	(Switzerland) Mathias Beche (United Kingdom) Richard Bradley (Slovakia) Miroslav Konôpka	Gibson GK428 4.2 L V8	G	227	+18 Laps
23	**LMGTE Am**	**46**	**(Germany) Team Project 1**	**(Italy) Matteo Cairoli (Switzerland) Nicolas Leutwiler (Denmark) Mikkel O. Pedersen**	**Porsche 911 RSR-19**	MI	**226**	**+19 Laps‡**
23	**LMGTE Am**	**46**	**(Germany) Team Project 1**	**(Italy) Matteo Cairoli (Switzerland) Nicolas Leutwiler (Denmark) Mikkel O. Pedersen**	Porsche 4.2 L Flat-6	MI	**226**	**+19 Laps‡**
24	LMGTE Am	56	(Germany) Team Project 1	(United Kingdom) Ben Barnicoat (United States) P.J. Hyett (United States) Gunnar Jeannette	Porsche 911 RSR-19	MI	226	+19 Laps
24	LMGTE Am	56	(Germany) Team Project 1	(United Kingdom) Ben Barnicoat (United States) P.J. Hyett (United States) Gunnar Jeannette	Porsche 4.2 L Flat-6	MI	226	+19 Laps
25	LMGTE Am	85	(Italy) Iron Dames	(Belgium) Sarah Bovy (Switzerland) Rahel Frey (Denmark) Michelle Gatting	Ferrari 488 GTE Evo	MI	226	+19 Laps
25	LMGTE Am	85	(Italy) Iron Dames	(Belgium) Sarah Bovy (Switzerland) Rahel Frey (Denmark) Michelle Gatting	Ferrari F154CB 3.9 L Turbo V8	MI	226	+19 Laps
26	LMGTE Am	33	(United Kingdom) TF Sport	(Portugal) Henrique Chaves (United States) Ben Keating (Denmark) Marco Sørensen	Aston Martin Vantage AMR	MI	226	+19 Laps
26	LMGTE Am	33	(United Kingdom) TF Sport	(Portugal) Henrique Chaves (United States) Ben Keating (Denmark) Marco Sørensen	Aston Martin 4.0 L Turbo V8	MI	226	+19 Laps
27	LMGTE Am	98	(Canada) Northwest AMR	(Canada) Paul Dalla Lana (Denmark) Nicki Thiim (United Kingdom) David Pittard	Aston Martin Vantage AMR	MI	226	+19 Laps
27	LMGTE Am	98	(Canada) Northwest AMR	(Canada) Paul Dalla Lana (Denmark) Nicki Thiim (United Kingdom) David Pittard	Aston Martin 4.0 L Turbo V8	MI	226	+19 Laps
28	LMGTE Am	86	(United Kingdom) GR Racing	(United Kingdom) Ben Barker (Italy) Riccardo Pera (United Kingdom) Michael Wainwright	Porsche 911 RSR-19	MI	226	+19 Laps
28	LMGTE Am	86	(United Kingdom) GR Racing	(United Kingdom) Ben Barker (Italy) Riccardo Pera (United Kingdom) Michael Wainwright	Porsche 4.2 L Flat-6	MI	226	+19 Laps
29	LMGTE Am	54	(Italy) AF Corse	(New Zealand) Nick Cassidy (Italy) Francesco Castellacci (Switzerland) Thomas Flohr	Ferrari 488 GTE Evo	MI	226	+19 Laps
29	LMGTE Am	54	(Italy) AF Corse	(New Zealand) Nick Cassidy (Italy) Francesco Castellacci (Switzerland) Thomas Flohr	Ferrari F154CB 3.9 L Turbo V8	MI	226	+19 Laps
30	LMGTE Am	77	(Germany) Dempsey-Proton Racing	(United Kingdom) Sebastian Priaulx (Germany) Christian Ried (United Kingdom) Harry Tincknell	Porsche 911 RSR-19	MI	226	+19 Laps
30	LMGTE Am	77	(Germany) Dempsey-Proton Racing	(United Kingdom) Sebastian Priaulx (Germany) Christian Ried (United Kingdom) Harry Tincknell	Porsche 4.2 L Flat-6	MI	226	+19 Laps
31	LMGTE Am	60	(Italy) Iron Lynx	(Italy) Matteo Cressoni (Italy) Giancarlo Fisichella (Italy) Claudio Schiavoni	Ferrari 488 GTE Evo	MI	225	+20 Laps
31	LMGTE Am	60	(Italy) Iron Lynx	(Italy) Matteo Cressoni (Italy) Giancarlo Fisichella (Italy) Claudio Schiavoni	Ferrari F154CB 3.9 L Turbo V8	MI	225	+20 Laps
32	LMGTE Am	777	(Japan) D'Station Racing	(United Kingdom) Charlie Fagg (Japan) Tomonobu Fujii (Japan) Satoshi Hoshino	Aston Martin Vantage AMR	MI	225	+20 Laps
32	LMGTE Am	777	(Japan) D'Station Racing	(United Kingdom) Charlie Fagg (Japan) Tomonobu Fujii (Japan) Satoshi Hoshino	Aston Martin 4.0 L Turbo V8	MI	225	+20 Laps
33	LMGTE Am	21	(Italy) AF Corse	(United States) Simon Mann (Switzerland) Christoph Ulrich (Finland) Toni Vilander	Ferrari 488 GTE Evo	MI	225	+20 Laps
33	LMGTE Am	21	(Italy) AF Corse	(United States) Simon Mann (Switzerland) Christoph Ulrich (Finland) Toni Vilander	Ferrari F154CB 3.9 L Turbo V8	MI	225	+20 Laps
34	LMGTE Am	88	(Germany) Dempsey-Proton Racing	(Belgium) Jan Heylen (United States) Patrick Lindsey (United States) Fred Poordad	Porsche 911 RSR-19	MI	224	+21 Laps
34	LMGTE Am	88	(Germany) Dempsey-Proton Racing	(Belgium) Jan Heylen (United States) Patrick Lindsey (United States) Fred Poordad	Porsche 4.2 L Flat-6	MI	224	+21 Laps
35	LMGTE Am	71	(Switzerland) Spirit of Race	(France) Gabriel Aubry (France) Franck Dezoteux (France) Pierre Ragues	Ferrari 488 GTE Evo	MI	224	+21 Laps
35	LMGTE Am	71	(Switzerland) Spirit of Race	(France) Gabriel Aubry (France) Franck Dezoteux (France) Pierre Ragues	Ferrari F154CB 3.9 L Turbo V8	MI	224	+21 Laps
NC	LMP2	34	(Poland) Inter Europol Competition	(United Kingdom) Alex Brundle (Mexico) Esteban Gutiérrez (Poland) Jakub Śmiechowski	Oreca 07	G	231	Powertrain
NC	LMP2	34	(Poland) Inter Europol Competition	(United Kingdom) Alex Brundle (Mexico) Esteban Gutiérrez (Poland) Jakub Śmiechowski	Gibson GK428 4.2 L V8	G	231	Powertrain
Ret	Hypercar	93	(France) Peugeot TotalEnergies	(United Kingdom) Paul di Resta (Denmark) Mikkel Jensen (France) Jean-Éric Vergne	Peugeot 9X8	MI	171	Gearbox
Ret	Hypercar	93	(France) Peugeot TotalEnergies	(United Kingdom) Paul di Resta (Denmark) Mikkel Jensen (France) Jean-Éric Vergne	Peugeot X6H 2.6 L Turbo V6	MI	171	Gearbox

== Standings after the race ==
2022 Hypercar World Endurance Drivers' Championship

Pos	+/-	Driver	Points
1		(Switzerland) Sébastien Buemi (New Zealand) Brendon Hartley (Japan) Ryō Hirakawa	149
2		(France) Nicolas Lapierre (Brazil) André Negrão (France) Matthieu Vaxivière	144
3		(United Kingdom) Mike Conway (Japan) Kamui Kobayashi (Argentina) José María López	133
4		(France) Romain Dumas (France) Olivier Pla	70
5		(Brazil) Pipo Derani	47

2022 Hypercar World Endurance Manufacturers' Championship

Pos	+/-	Manufacturer	Points
1		(Japan) Toyota	186
2		(France) Alpine	144
3		(United States) Glickenhaus	70
4		(France) Peugeot	42

2022 World Endurance GTE Drivers' Championship

Pos	+/-	Driver	Points
1		(United Kingdom) James Calado (Italy) Alessandro Pier Guidi	135
2		(Denmark) Michael Christensen (France) Kévin Estre	132
3	2	(Italy) Antonio Fuoco (Spain) Miguel Molina	131
4	1	(Italy) Gianmaria Bruni	125
5	1	(Austria) Richard Lietz	115

2022 World Endurance GTE Manufacturers' Championship

Pos	+/-	Team	Points
1		(Italy) Ferrari	269
2		(Germany) Porsche	257
3		(United States) Chevrolet	102

- Note: Only the top five positions are included for the Drivers' Championship standings.
