= 2018 Euroformula Open Championship =

Motor racing competition

The 2018 Euroformula Open Championship is a multi-event motor racing championship for single-seat open wheel formula racing cars that is held across Europe. The championship features drivers competing in two-litre Formula Three racing cars built by Italian constructor Dallara which conform to the technical regulations, or formula, for the championship. It was the fifth Euroformula Open Championship season.

== Teams and drivers ==
- All cars were Dallara F312 which were powered by Toyota engines.

Team	No.	Driver	Status	Rounds
(Italy) RP Motorsport	1	(Poland) Julia Pankiewicz	R	NC
(Italy) RP Motorsport	1	(Poland) Alex Karkosik	R	1
(Italy) RP Motorsport	1	(Netherlands) Leonard Hoogenboom		4
(Italy) RP Motorsport	1	(United States) Kaylen Frederick		6
(Italy) RP Motorsport	1	(Germany) David Schumacher	G	7–8
(Italy) RP Motorsport	3	(Morocco) Michaël Benyahia	R	NC, 1–3
(Italy) RP Motorsport	3	(Italy) Leonardo Lorandi		6
(Italy) RP Motorsport	3	(Brazil) Christian Hahn		7
(Italy) RP Motorsport	3	(United States) Kaylen Frederick		8
(Italy) RP Motorsport	4	(Brazil) Felipe Drugovich		NC, All
(Italy) RP Motorsport	6	(Italy) Alessandro Bracalente	G	8
(Italy) RP Motorsport	51	(Italy) Aldo Festante	R	NC, 1–2
(Italy) RP Motorsport	51	(Netherlands) Leonard Hoogenboom		3
(Italy) RP Motorsport	77	(Brazil) Guilherme Samaia		NC, All
(United Kingdom) Carlin Motorsport	5	(United States) Dev Gore	R	5–8
(United Kingdom) Carlin Motorsport	28	(United States) Cameron Das		NC, All
(United Kingdom) Carlin Motorsport	34	(Brazil) Matheus Iorio		NC, All
(Spain) Drivex	7	(Germany) Jannes Fittje		NC, 1–3
(Spain) Drivex	8	(Austria) Lukas Dunner	R	NC, All
(Spain) Drivex	12	(Brazil) Christian Hahn		NC, 1–6
(Spain) Drivex	22	(Switzerland) Patrick Schott	G	8
(Spain) Drivex	58	(Mexico) Javier González	G	7–8
(Spain) Teo Martín Motorsport	10	(Netherlands) Bent Viscaal	R	NC, All
(Spain) Teo Martín Motorsport	32	(Switzerland) Moritz Müller-Crepon	R	NC, 1
(Spain) Teo Martín Motorsport	51	(Italy) Aldo Festante	R	5–8
(Spain) Campos Racing	11	(Poland) Alex Karkosik		2–6
(Spain) Campos Racing	11	(Romania) Petru Florescu		7
(Spain) Campos Racing	11	(United States) Brad Benavides	G	8
(Spain) Campos Racing	15	(United States) Yves Baltas	R	1–5
(Spain) Campos Racing	18	(Argentina) Marcos Siebert		All
(United Kingdom) Fortec Motorsports	19	(Romania) Petru Florescu		NC, 1
(United Kingdom) Fortec Motorsports	19	(Mexico) Raúl Guzmán	R	2
(United Kingdom) Fortec Motorsports	19	(Italy) Aldo Festante	R	3–4
(United Kingdom) Fortec Motorsports	20	(Ukraine) Aleksey Chuklin		NC
(United Kingdom) Fortec Motorsports	21	(Australia) Calan Williams		NC, 1–6

== Race calendar and results ==
- An eight-round provisional calendar was revealed on 23 October 2017. The calendar will feature the same eight circuits like in 2017. All rounds will support the International GT Open, excepting Jerez. Rounds denoted with a blue background are part of the Spanish Formula Three Championship.

Round		Circuit	Date	Pole position	Fastest lap	Winning driver	Winning team	Rookie Winner
NC	R1	(France) Circuit Paul Ricard, Le Castellet	3 March	(Netherlands) Bent Viscaal	(Netherlands) Bent Viscaal	(Netherlands) Bent Viscaal	(Spain) Teo Martín Motorsport	(Netherlands) Bent Viscaal
NC	R2	(France) Circuit Paul Ricard, Le Castellet	3 March		(Netherlands) Bent Viscaal	(Netherlands) Bent Viscaal	(Spain) Teo Martín Motorsport	(Netherlands) Bent Viscaal
1	R1	(Portugal) Autódromo do Estoril	14 April	(Brazil) Felipe Drugovich	(United States) Cameron Das	(Brazil) Felipe Drugovich	(Italy) RP Motorsport	(Netherlands) Bent Viscaal
1	R2	(Portugal) Autódromo do Estoril	15 April	(Romania) Petru Florescu	(Argentina) Marcos Siebert	(Argentina) Marcos Siebert	(Spain) Campos Racing	(Netherlands) Bent Viscaal
2	R1	(France) Circuit Paul Ricard, Le Castellet	5 May	(Brazil) Felipe Drugovich	(Brazil) Felipe Drugovich	(Brazil) Felipe Drugovich	(Italy) RP Motorsport	(Netherlands) Bent Viscaal
2	R2	(France) Circuit Paul Ricard, Le Castellet	6 May	(Brazil) Felipe Drugovich	(Brazil) Felipe Drugovich	(Brazil) Felipe Drugovich	(Italy) RP Motorsport	(Netherlands) Bent Viscaal
3	R1	(Belgium) Circuit de Spa-Francorchamps	9 June	(Brazil) Felipe Drugovich	(Argentina) Marcos Siebert	(Brazil) Felipe Drugovich	(Italy) RP Motorsport	(Austria) Lukas Dunner
3	R2	(Belgium) Circuit de Spa-Francorchamps	10 June	(Brazil) Felipe Drugovich	(Brazil) Felipe Drugovich	(Brazil) Felipe Drugovich	(Italy) RP Motorsport	(Netherlands) Bent Viscaal
4	R1	(Hungary) Hungaroring	7 July	(Brazil) Felipe Drugovich	(Brazil) Felipe Drugovich	(Brazil) Felipe Drugovich	(Italy) RP Motorsport	(Netherlands) Bent Viscaal
4	R2	(Hungary) Hungaroring	8 July	(Netherlands) Bent Viscaal	(Brazil) Felipe Drugovich	(Brazil) Felipe Drugovich	(Italy) RP Motorsport	(Netherlands) Bent Viscaal
5	R1	(United Kingdom) Silverstone Circuit	1 September	(Brazil) Felipe Drugovich	(Brazil) Felipe Drugovich	(Brazil) Felipe Drugovich	(Italy) RP Motorsport	(Netherlands) Bent Viscaal
5	R2	(United Kingdom) Silverstone Circuit	2 September	(Netherlands) Bent Viscaal	(Netherlands) Bent Viscaal	(Netherlands) Bent Viscaal	(Spain) Teo Martín Motorsport	(Netherlands) Bent Viscaal
6	R1	(Italy) Autodromo Nazionale Monza	22 September	(Netherlands) Bent Viscaal	(Brazil) Felipe Drugovich	(Brazil) Felipe Drugovich	(Italy) RP Motorsport	(Austria) Lukas Dunner
6	R2	(Italy) Autodromo Nazionale Monza	23 September	(Brazil) Felipe Drugovich	(United States) Kaylen Frederick	(Brazil) Felipe Drugovich	(Italy) RP Motorsport	(Netherlands) Bent Viscaal
7	R1	(Spain) Circuito de Jerez	6 October	(Brazil) Felipe Drugovich (Note: Marcos Siebert qualified on pole for Jerez Race 1, but received a grid penalty for an infraction from the previous round at Monza. Siebert still received the point for being the fastest qualifier.)	(Brazil) Felipe Drugovich	(Brazil) Felipe Drugovich	(Italy) RP Motorsport	(Netherlands) Bent Viscaal
7	R2	(Spain) Circuito de Jerez	7 October	(Brazil) Felipe Drugovich	(Brazil) Felipe Drugovich	(Brazil) Felipe Drugovich	(Italy) RP Motorsport	(Netherlands) Bent Viscaal
8	R1	(Spain) Circuit de Barcelona-Catalunya	20 October	(Argentina) Marcos Siebert	(Brazil) Felipe Drugovich	(Brazil) Felipe Drugovich	(Italy) RP Motorsport	(Netherlands) Bent Viscaal
8	R2	(Spain) Circuit de Barcelona-Catalunya	21 October	(Netherlands) Bent Viscaal	(Netherlands) Bent Viscaal	(Brazil) Felipe Drugovich	(Italy) RP Motorsport	(Netherlands) Bent Viscaal

== Standings ==
=== Euroformula Open Championship ===
==== Drivers' championship ====
- Points were awarded as follows:

1	2	3	4	5	6	7	8	9	10	PP	FL
25	18	15	12	10	8	6	4	2	1	**1**	1

Pos	Driver	LEC1 (France)		EST (Portugal)		LEC2 (France)		SPA (Belgium)		HUN (Hungary)		SIL (United Kingdom)		MNZ (Italy)		JER (Spain)		CAT (Spain)		Pts
Pos	Driver	NC		R1	R2	R1	R2	R1	R2	R1	R2	R1	R2	R1	R2	R1	R2	R1	R2	Pts
1	(Brazil) Felipe Drugovich	2	2	**1**	2	**1**	**1**	**1**	**1**	**1**	1	**1**	2	1	**1**	**1**	**1**	1	1	405
2	(Netherlands) Bent Viscaal	**1**	1	5	3	2	7	5	3	2	**2**	2	**1**	**Ret**	2	2	2	3	**2**	246
3	(Argentina) Marcos Siebert			4	1	8	6	11	4	3	3	5	4	2	Ret	4	3	**2**	3	195
4	(Brazil) Matheus Iorio	Ret	5	2	7	3	2	2	6	4	5	7	6	5	4	3	6	5	Ret	178
5	(United States) Cameron Das	5	3	3	6	6	3	Ret	5	5	4	6	3	Ret	3	6	4	6	5	159
6	(Brazil) Guilherme Samaia	10	11	7	8	4	4	3	8	Ret	10	10	10	11	7	7	7	7	6	94
7	(Austria) Lukas Dunner	4	DNS	6	12	Ret	14	4	10	9	8	3	5	3	Ret	5	Ret	8	Ret	81
8	(Poland) Alex Karkosik			13	9	7	5	Ret	2	Ret	6	4	9	6	Ret					66
9	(Italy) Aldo Festante	Ret	Ret	11	10	5	10	Ret	15	8	13	11	Ret	8	Ret	10	Ret	Ret	7	29
10	(Brazil) Christian Hahn	8	Ret	12	Ret	10	11	6	9	Ret	7	13	11	7	9	9	11			29
11	(Australia) Calan Williams	7	9	14	11	Ret	12	7	14	6	11	9	8	10	8					25
12	(Germany) Jannes Fittje	3	4	8	4	9	9	9	12											22
13	(Romania) Petru Florescu	Ret	7	Ret	**5**											8	9			21
14	(United States) Kaylen Frederick													12	5			11	9	21
15	(Italy) Leonardo Lorandi													4	6					20
16	(United States) Yves Baltas			9	15	Ret	13	Ret	13	7	12	8	7							18
17	(United States) Dev Gore											12	12	9	10	11	10	Ret	10	11
18	(Netherlands) Leonard Hoogenboom							10	7	Ret	9									9
19	(Morocco) Michaël Benyahia	6	6	10	13	Ret	8	8	11											9
20	(Mexico) Raúl Guzmán					11	15													0
21	(Switzerland) Moritz Müller-Crepon	9	Ret	15	14															0
Guest drivers ineligible to score points
—	(Germany) David Schumacher															12	8	4	4	—
—	(Mexico) Javier González															Ret	5	Ret	8	—
—	(United States) Brad Benavides																	9	13	—
—	(Switzerland) Patrick Schott																	10	11	—
—	(Italy) Alessandro Bracalente																	12	12	—
Non-championship round-only drivers
—	(Ukraine) Aleksey Chuklin	11	8																	—
—	(Poland) Julia Pankiewicz	12	10																	—
Pos	Driver	NC		R1	R2	R1	R2	R1	R2	R1	R2	R1	R2	R1	R2	R1	R2	R1	R2	Pts
Pos	Driver	LEC1 (France)		EST (Portugal)		LEC2 (France)		SPA (Belgium)		HUN (Hungary)		SIL (United Kingdom)		MNZ (Italy)		JER (Spain)		CAT (Spain)		Pts

Colour	Result
Gold	Winner
Silver	Second place
Bronze	Third place
Green	Points classification
Blue	Non-points classification
Blue	Non-classified finish (NC)
Purple	Retired, not classified (Ret)
Red	Did not qualify (DNQ)
Red	Did not pre-qualify (DNPQ)
Black	Disqualified (DSQ)
White	Did not start (DNS)
White	Withdrew (WD)
White	Race cancelled (C)
Blank	Did not practice (DNP)
Blank	Did not arrive (DNA)
Blank	Excluded (EX)

**Bold** – Pole
Italics – Fastest Lap

==== Rookies' championship ====
- Points were awarded as follows:

1	2	3	4	5
10	8	6	4	3

Pos	Driver	LEC1 (France)		EST (Portugal)		LEC2 (France)		SPA (Belgium)		HUN (Hungary)		SIL (United Kingdom)		MNZ (Italy)		JER (Spain)		CAT (Spain)		Pts
Pos	Driver	NC		R1	R2	R1	R2	R1	R2	R1	R2	R1	R2	R1	R2	R1	R2	R1	R2	Pts
1	(Netherlands) Bent Viscaal	1	1	5	3	2	7	5	3	2	2	2	1	Ret	2	2	2	1	2	138
2	(Austria) Lukas Dunner	4	DNS	6	12	Ret	14	4	10	9	8	3	6	3	Ret	5	Ret	8	Ret	90
3	(Italy) Aldo Festante	Ret	Ret	11	10	5	10	Ret	15	8	15	11	Ret	8	Ret	10	Ret	Ret	7	58
4	(United States) Yves Baltas			9	15	Ret	13	Ret	13	7	12	8	7							37
5	(United States) Dev Gore											12	12	9	10	11	10	Ret	10	35
6	(Morocco) Michaël Benyahia			10	13	Ret	8	8	11											26
7	(United States) Kaylen Frederick													12	5			11	9	23
8	(Netherlands) Leonard Hoogenboom							10	7	Ret	9									18
9	(Italy) Leonardo Lorandi													4	6					14
10	(Mexico) Raúl Guzmán					11	15													6
11	(Switzerland) Moritz Müller-Crepon	9	Ret	15	14															3
Guest drivers ineligible to score points
—	(Germany) David Schumacher															12	8	4	4	—
—	(Mexico) Javier González															Ret	5	Ret	8	—
—	(United States) Brad Benavides																	9	13	—
—	(Switzerland) Patrick Schott																	10	11	—
—	(Italy) Alessandro Bracalente																	12	12	—
Non-championship round-only drivers
—	(Poland) Julia Pankiewicz	12	10																	—
Pos	Driver	NC		R1	R2	R1	R2	R1	R2	R1	R2	R1	R2	R1	R2	R1	R2	R1	R2	Pts
Pos	Driver	LEC1 (France)		EST (Portugal)		LEC2 (France)		SPA (Belgium)		HUN (Hungary)		SIL (United Kingdom)		MNZ (Italy)		JER (Spain)		CAT (Spain)		Pts

==== Teams' championship ====
- Points were awarded as follows:

1	2	3	4	5
10	8	6	4	3

Pos	Driver	LEC1 (France)		EST (Portugal)		LEC2 (France)		SPA (Belgium)		HUN (Hungary)		SIL (United Kingdom)		MNZ (Italy)		JER (Spain)		CAT (Spain)		Pts
Pos	Driver	NC		R1	R2	R1	R2	R1	R2	R1	R2	R1	R2	R1	R2	R1	R2	R1	R2	Pts
1	(Italy) RP Motorsport	2	2	1	2	1	1	1	1	1	1	1	2	1	1	1	1	1	1	180
1	(Italy) RP Motorsport	6	6	7	8	4	4	3	7	Ret	9	10	10	4	5	7	7	7	6	180
2	(United Kingdom) Carlin Motorsport	5	3	2	6	3	2	2	5	4	4	6	3	5	3	3	4	5	5	102
2	(United Kingdom) Carlin Motorsport	Ret	5	3	7	6	3	Ret	6	5	5	7	6	Ret	4	6	6	6	10	102
3	(Spain) Teo Martín Motorsport	1	1	5	3	2	7	5	3	2	2	2	1	8	2	2	2	3	2	98
3	(Spain) Teo Martín Motorsport	9	Ret	15	14							11	Ret	Ret	Ret	10	Ret	Ret	7	98
4	(Spain) Campos Racing			4	1	7	5	11	2	3	3	5	4	2	Ret	4	3	2	3	86
4	(Spain) Campos Racing			9	15	8	6	Ret	4	7	6	5	7	6	Ret	8	9	9	13	86
5	(Spain) Drivex School	3	4	6	4	9	9	4	9	9	7	3	6	3	9	5	Ret	8	8	26
5	(Spain) Drivex School	4	13	8	12	10	11	6	10	Ret	8	13	11	7	Ret	Ret	5	10	11	26
6	(United Kingdom) Fortec Motorsport	7	7	14	5	11	12	7	14	6	11	9	8	10	8					3
6	(United Kingdom) Fortec Motorsport	11	8	Ret	11	15	Ret	Ret	15	8	13									3
Pos	Driver	NC		R1	R2	R1	R2	R1	R2	R1	R2	R1	R2	R1	R2	R1	R2	R1	R2	Pts
Pos	Driver	LEC1 (France)		EST (Portugal)		LEC2 (France)		SPA (Belgium)		HUN (Hungary)		SIL (United Kingdom)		MNZ (Italy)		JER (Spain)		CAT (Spain)		Pts

=== Spanish Formula 3 Championship ===
==== Drivers' championship ====
- Points were awarded as follows:

1	2	3	4	5	6	7	8	9	10	PP	FL
25	18	15	12	10	8	6	4	2	1	**1**	1

Pos	Driver	EST (Portugal)		JER (Spain)		CAT (Spain)		Pts
Pos	Driver	R1	R2	R1	R2	R1	R2	Pts
1	(Brazil) Felipe Drugovich	**1**	2	**1**	**1**	1	1	157
2	(Netherlands) Bent Viscaal	5	3	2	2	3	**2**	104
3	(United States) Cameron Das	3	6	6	4	6	5	73
4	(Brazil) Matheus Iorio	2	7	3	6	5	Ret	63
5	(Brazil) Guilherme Samaia	7	8	7	7	7	6	40
6	(Germany) David Schumacher			12	8	4	4	38
7	(Austria) Lukas Dunner	6	12	5	Ret	8	Ret	28
8	(Germany) Jannes Fittje	8	4					21
9	(Mexico) Javier González			Ret	5	Ret	8	18
10	(Italy) Aldo Festante	11	10	10	Ret	Ret	7	16
11	(Romania) Petru Florescu	Ret	**5**	8	9			13
12	(Brazil) Christian Hahn	12	Ret	9	11			11
13	(Switzerland) Patrick Schott					10	11	6
14	(United States) Kaylen Frederick					11	9	6
15	(Poland) Alex Karkosik	13	9					4
16	(Morocco) Michaël Benyahia	10	13					4
17	(Italy) Alessandro Bracalente					12	12	2
18	(Australia) Calan Williams	14	11					1
19	(Switzerland) Moritz Müller-Crepon	15	14					0
Guest drivers ineligible to score points
	(Argentina) Marcos Siebert	4	1	4	3	2	3	
	(United States) Yves Baltas	9	15					
	(United States) Brad Benavides					9	13	
	(United States) Dev Gore			11	10	Ret	10	
Pos	Driver	R1	R2	R1	R2	R1	R2	Pts
Pos	Driver	EST (Portugal)		JER (Spain)		CAT (Spain)		Pts

==== Teams' championship ====
- Points were awarded as follows:

1	2	3	4	5
10	8	6	4	3

Pos	Driver	EST (Portugal)		JER (Spain)		CAT (Spain)		Pts
Pos	Driver	R1	R2	R1	R2	R1	R2	Pts
1	(Italy) RP Motorsport	1	2	1	1	1	1	72
1	(Italy) RP Motorsport	7	8	7	7	4	4	72
2	(Spain) Teo Martín Motorsport	5	3	2	2	3	2	44
2	(Spain) Teo Martín Motorsport	15	14	10	Ret	Ret	7	44
3	(United Kingdom) Carlin Motorsport	2	6	3	4	5	5	43
3	(United Kingdom) Carlin Motorsport	3	7	6	6	6	13	43
4	(Spain) Drivex School	6	4	5	5	8	8	13
4	(Spain) Drivex School	8	12	Ret	Ret	10	11	13
5	(United Kingdom) Fortec Motorsport	14	5					4
5	(United Kingdom) Fortec Motorsport	Ret	11					4
Guest teams ineligible to score points
	(Spain) Campos Racing	4	1	4	3	2	3	
	(Spain) Campos Racing	9	15	8	9	9	13	
Pos	Driver	R1	R2	R1	R2	R1	R2	Pts
Pos	Driver	EST (Portugal)		JER (Spain)		CAT (Spain)		Pts
