= 2026 GT4 America Series =

Motor racing competition

The 2026 Pirelli GT4 America Series was the seventh season of the GT4 America Series. The season began on March 27 at Sonoma Raceway and finished on October 11 at Indianapolis Motor Speedway.

== Calendar ==
The preliminary calendar was released on June 27, 2025, featuring 13 races across seven rounds with two events to be confirmed later. On August 13, the calendar was confirmed with Road Atlanta returning for the first time since 2011, and Road America was also retained. A further change was made on September 19, the round at Sebring International Raceway moved forward one week to avoid a conflict with Ferrari Challenge North America.

Race is an Endurance Round

Round	Circuit	Date	Map
1	Sonoma Raceway, Sonoma, California	March 27–29	2026 GT4 America Series is located in the United States
2	Circuit of the Americas, Austin, Texas	April 24–26	2026 GT4 America Series is located in the United States
3	Sebring International Raceway, Sebring, Florida	May 7–9	2026 GT4 America Series is located in the United States
4	(Georgia (U.S. state)) Road Atlanta, Braselton, Georgia	June 12–14	2026 GT4 America Series is located in the United States
5	Road America, Elkhart Lake, Wisconsin	August 28–30	2026 GT4 America Series is located in the United States
6	Barber Motorsports Park, Birmingham, Alabama	September 25–27	2026 GT4 America Series is located in the United States
7	Indianapolis Motor Speedway, Indianapolis, Indiana	October 8–11	2026 GT4 America Series is located in the United States

== Entry list ==
Team	Car	Engine	No.	Drivers	Class	Rounds
(United States) Precision Racing	Toyota GR Supra GT4 Evo2	Toyota B58H 3.0 L Turbo I6	03	(United States) Ryan Eversley	PA	All
(United States) Precision Racing	Toyota GR Supra GT4 Evo2	Toyota B58H 3.0 L Turbo I6	03	(United States) Karl Forman	PA	All
(United States) OGH Motorsports	McLaren Artura GT4	McLaren M630 3.0 L Turbo V6	5	(United States) Sean Gibbons	Am	1–4, 7
(United States) OGH Motorsports	McLaren Artura GT4	McLaren M630 3.0 L Turbo V6	5	(United States) Sam Owen	Am	1–4, 7
(United States) ACI Motorsports	Porsche 718 Cayman GT4 RS Clubsport	Porsche MDG.GA 4.0 L Flat-6	7	(United States) Yves Baltas	S	All
(United States) ACI Motorsports	Porsche 718 Cayman GT4 RS Clubsport	Porsche MDG.GA 4.0 L Flat-6	7	(Dominican Republic) Jimmy Llibre	S	1–6 (Note: Jimmy Llibre was on the entry list for the Barber round, but was replaced by Trenton Estep.)
(United States) ACI Motorsports	Porsche 718 Cayman GT4 RS Clubsport	Porsche MDG.GA 4.0 L Flat-6	7	(United States) Trenton Estep	S	6–7
(United States) ACI Motorsports	Porsche 718 Cayman GT4 RS Clubsport	Porsche MDG.GA 4.0 L Flat-6	10	(United States) Muzaffar Gafurov	Am	All
(United States) ACI Motorsports	Porsche 718 Cayman GT4 RS Clubsport	Porsche MDG.GA 4.0 L Flat-6	10	(United States) Ross Poole	Am	1–4, 6–7 (Note: Ross Poole was on the entry list for the Road America round, but was replaced by Curt Swearingin.)
(United States) ACI Motorsports	Porsche 718 Cayman GT4 RS Clubsport	Porsche MDG.GA 4.0 L Flat-6	10	(United States) Curt Swearingin	Am	4–5 (Note: Curt Swearingin was on the entry list for the Road America round, but was replaced by Ross Poole.)
(United States) ACI Motorsports	Porsche 718 Cayman GT4 RS Clubsport	Porsche MDG.GA 4.0 L Flat-6	25	(Canada) Damir Hot	PA	All
(United States) ACI Motorsports	Porsche 718 Cayman GT4 RS Clubsport	Porsche MDG.GA 4.0 L Flat-6	25	(New Zealand) Ryan Yardley	PA	All
(United States) ACI Motorsports	BMW M4 GT4 Evo (G82)	BMW S58B30T0 3.0 L Turbo I6	21	(United States) Alex Garcia	Am	All
(United States) ACI Motorsports	BMW M4 GT4 Evo (G82)	BMW S58B30T0 3.0 L Turbo I6	21	(United States) Michael Garcia	Am	All
(United States) CSM	Aston Martin Vantage AMR GT4	Aston Martin M177 4.0 L Turbo V8	007	(United States) Ismaeel Ellahi	S	7
(United States) CSM	Aston Martin Vantage AMR GT4	Aston Martin M177 4.0 L Turbo V8	007	(United States) Ayrton Houk	S	7
(United States) 89x Motorsports	Aston Martin Vantage AMR GT4	Aston Martin M177 4.0 L Turbo V8	9	(United States) Christian Pipas	Am	6
(United States) 89x Motorsports	Aston Martin Vantage AMR GT4	Aston Martin M177 4.0 L Turbo V8	9	(United States) Mike Fitzpatrick	Am	6
(United States) McCumbee McAleer Racing	Ford Mustang GT4 (S650)	Ford Coyote 5.0 L V8	11	(United States) Jenson Altzman	PA	6
(United States) McCumbee McAleer Racing	Ford Mustang GT4 (S650)	Ford Coyote 5.0 L V8	11	(Canada) Carlton MacFarlane	PA	6
(United States) McCumbee McAleer Racing	Ford Mustang GT4 (S650)	Ford Coyote 5.0 L V8	11	(Canada) Carlton MacFarlane	Am	7
(United States) McCumbee McAleer Racing	Ford Mustang GT4 (S650)	Ford Coyote 5.0 L V8	11	(United States) Zachry Lee	Am	7
(United States) McCumbee McAleer Racing	Ford Mustang GT4 (S650)	Ford Coyote 5.0 L V8	48	(United States) Jenson Altzman	PA	1–5
(United States) McCumbee McAleer Racing	Ford Mustang GT4 (S650)	Ford Coyote 5.0 L V8	48	(United States) Zachry Lee	PA	1–5
(United States) McCumbee McAleer Racing	Ford Mustang GT4 (S650)	Ford Coyote 5.0 L V8	77	(United States) Nolan Allaer	PA	4–7
(United States) McCumbee McAleer Racing	Ford Mustang GT4 (S650)	Ford Coyote 5.0 L V8	77	(United States) Michael Tosi	PA	4–7
(United States) Rigid Speed Company	BMW M4 GT4 Evo (G82)	BMW S58B30T0 3.0 L Turbo I6	17	(United States) Joseph Catania	Am	1, 3–7
(United States) Rigid Speed Company	BMW M4 GT4 Evo (G82)	BMW S58B30T0 3.0 L Turbo I6	17	(United States) Lucas Catania	Am	1, 3–7
(United States) Auto Technic Racing	BMW M4 GT4 Evo (G82)	BMW S58B30T0 3.0 L Turbo I6	19	(United Kingdom) Stevan McAleer	PA	All (Note: Roland Krainz was on the entry list for the Sebring round, but was replaced mid-way through the weekend by Stuart McAleer.)
(United States) Auto Technic Racing	BMW M4 GT4 Evo (G82)	BMW S58B30T0 3.0 L Turbo I6	19	(United States) Roland Krainz	PA	All
(United States) Auto Technic Racing	BMW M4 GT4 Evo (G82)	BMW S58B30T0 3.0 L Turbo I6	19	(United Kingdom) Stuart McAleer	PA	3
(United States) Auto Technic Racing	BMW M4 GT4 Evo (G82)	BMW S58B30T0 3.0 L Turbo I6	51	(United States) Kevin Boehm	S	All
(United States) Auto Technic Racing	BMW M4 GT4 Evo (G82)	BMW S58B30T0 3.0 L Turbo I6	51	(United States) Francis Selldorff	S	All
(United States) Kellymoss	Porsche 718 Cayman GT4 RS Clubsport	Porsche MDG.GA 4.0 L Flat-6	24	(United States) Ashley Freiberg	S	All
(United States) Kellymoss	Porsche 718 Cayman GT4 RS Clubsport	Porsche MDG.GA 4.0 L Flat-6	24	(United States) Loni Unser	S	All
(United States) Kellymoss	Porsche 718 Cayman GT4 RS Clubsport	Porsche MDG.GA 4.0 L Flat-6	52	(United States) Eric Filgueiras	PA	1–5
(United States) Kellymoss	Porsche 718 Cayman GT4 RS Clubsport	Porsche MDG.GA 4.0 L Flat-6	52	(United States) Tom Kopczynski	PA	1–5
(United States) Kellymoss	Porsche 718 Cayman GT4 RS Clubsport	Porsche MDG.GA 4.0 L Flat-6	73	(Canada) Erika Hoffmann	S	1–5, 7
(United States) Kellymoss	Porsche 718 Cayman GT4 RS Clubsport	Porsche MDG.GA 4.0 L Flat-6	73	(United States) Jack Parriott	S	1–3 (Note: Jack Parriott was on the entry list for the Sebring round, but was replaced by Paul Bocuse.)
(United States) Kellymoss	Porsche 718 Cayman GT4 RS Clubsport	Porsche MDG.GA 4.0 L Flat-6	73	(United States) Paul Bocuse	S	3–5, 7 (Note: Paul Bocuse was on the entry list for the Road America round, but was replaced by Riley Dickinson. Bocuse was also on the entry list for the Indianapolis round, but was replaced by Eric Filgueiras.)
(United States) Kellymoss	Porsche 718 Cayman GT4 RS Clubsport	Porsche MDG.GA 4.0 L Flat-6	73	(United States) Riley Dickinson	S	5
(United States) Kellymoss	Porsche 718 Cayman GT4 RS Clubsport	Porsche MDG.GA 4.0 L Flat-6	73	(United States) Eric Filgueiras	S	7
(United States) RS1	Porsche 718 Cayman GT4 RS Clubsport	Porsche MDG.GA 4.0 L Flat-6	028	(United States) Luca Mars	S	All
(United States) RS1	Porsche 718 Cayman GT4 RS Clubsport	Porsche MDG.GA 4.0 L Flat-6	028	(United States) Spencer Pumpelly	S	All
(United States) TechSport Racing	Ford Mustang GT4 (S650)	Ford Coyote 5.0 L V8	30	(United States) Frankie Muniz	Am	All
(United States) TechSport Racing	Ford Mustang GT4 (S650)	Ford Coyote 5.0 L V8	30	(United States) Tyler Stone	Am	All
(United States) Blackdog Racing	McLaren Artura GT4	McLaren M630 3.0 L Turbo V6	33	(United States) Michael Cooper	PA	All
(United States) Blackdog Racing	McLaren Artura GT4	McLaren M630 3.0 L Turbo V6	33	(United States) Tony Gaples	PA	All
(United States) BimmerWorld Racing	BMW M4 GT4 Evo (G82)	BMW S58B30T0 3.0 L Turbo I6	36	(United States) James Clay	Am	All
(United States) BimmerWorld Racing	BMW M4 GT4 Evo (G82)	BMW S58B30T0 3.0 L Turbo I6	36	(United States) James Walker Jr.	Am	All
(United States) BimmerWorld Racing	BMW M4 GT4 Evo (G82)	BMW S58B30T0 3.0 L Turbo I6	38	(United States) Tyler McQuarrie	PA	All
(United States) BimmerWorld Racing	BMW M4 GT4 Evo (G82)	BMW S58B30T0 3.0 L Turbo I6	38	(United States) Michael Petramalo	PA	All
(United States) Dome Motorsport	Mercedes-AMG GT4	Mercedes-AMG M178 4.0 L Turbo V8	37	(United States) Ed Killeen	Am	All
(United States) Dome Motorsport	Mercedes-AMG GT4	Mercedes-AMG M178 4.0 L Turbo V8	37	(United States) Laura Hayes	Am	1, 3–7
(United States) Dome Motorsport	Mercedes-AMG GT4	Mercedes-AMG M178 4.0 L Turbo V8	37	(Canada) Ron Tomlinson	Am	2
(United States) Dome Motorsport	Mercedes-AMG GT4	Mercedes-AMG M178 4.0 L Turbo V8	39	(United States) Marc Miller	PA	All
(United States) Dome Motorsport	Mercedes-AMG GT4	Mercedes-AMG M178 4.0 L Turbo V8	39	(United States) Allen Patten	PA	All
(United States) Off Leash Motorsports	Mercedes-AMG GT4	Mercedes-AMG M178 4.0 L Turbo V8	40	(United States) Kevin Clifford	PA	1, 3–7
(United States) Off Leash Motorsports	Mercedes-AMG GT4	Mercedes-AMG M178 4.0 L Turbo V8	40	(United States) Harry Gottsacker	PA	1, 3–7
(United States) VPX Motorsport	Aston Martin Vantage AMR GT4	Aston Martin M177 4.0 L Turbo V8	44	(Canada) Jaden Harry	PA	6
(United States) VPX Motorsport	Aston Martin Vantage AMR GT4	Aston Martin M177 4.0 L Turbo V8	44	(United States) Joseph Maley	PA	6
(United States) NOLASPORT	Porsche 718 Cayman GT4 RS Clubsport	Porsche MDG.GA 4.0 L Flat-6	47	(Brazil) Matheus Leist	PA	All
(United States) NOLASPORT	Porsche 718 Cayman GT4 RS Clubsport	Porsche MDG.GA 4.0 L Flat-6	47	(United States) Matt Travis	PA	All
(United States) Bryan Herta Autosport with Curb-Agajanian	McLaren Artura GT4	McLaren M630 3.0 L Turbo V6	49	(United States) Alessandro Chiocchetti	PA	4–5
(United States) Bryan Herta Autosport with Curb-Agajanian	McLaren Artura GT4	McLaren M630 3.0 L Turbo V6	49	(United States) Mason Filippi	PA	4–5
(United States) Racers Edge Motorsports	Aston Martin Vantage AMR GT4	Aston Martin M177 4.0 L Turbo V8	54	(United States) Christian Bach	PA	5
(United States) Racers Edge Motorsports	Aston Martin Vantage AMR GT4	Aston Martin M177 4.0 L Turbo V8	54	(United States) Billy Johnson	PA	5
(United States) RAFA Racing Team	Toyota GR Supra GT4 Evo2	Toyota B58H 3.0 L Turbo I6	68	(United States) Tyler Gonzalez	S	All
(United States) RAFA Racing Team	Toyota GR Supra GT4 Evo2	Toyota B58H 3.0 L Turbo I6	68	(United States) Westin Workman	S	All
(United States) RAFA Racing Team	Toyota GR Supra GT4 Evo2	Toyota B58H 3.0 L Turbo I6	72	(United States) Anthony Geraci	Am	2–3, 5, 7
(United States) RAFA Racing Team	Toyota GR Supra GT4 Evo2	Toyota B58H 3.0 L Turbo I6	72	(United States) Rafael Martinez	Am	2
(United States) RAFA Racing Team	Toyota GR Supra GT4 Evo2	Toyota B58H 3.0 L Turbo I6	72	(United States) Kenny Schmied	Am	3, 5, 7
(United States) RAFA Racing Team	Toyota GR Supra GT4 Evo2	Toyota B58H 3.0 L Turbo I6	812	(Brazil) Werner Neugebauer	PA	All
(United States) RAFA Racing Team	Toyota GR Supra GT4 Evo2	Toyota B58H 3.0 L Turbo I6	812	(United States) Chris Spada	PA	All
(United States) Copeland Motorsports	Toyota GR Supra GT4 Evo2	Toyota B58H 3.0 L Turbo I6	71	(United States) John Dean	Am	7
(United States) Copeland Motorsports	Toyota GR Supra GT4 Evo2	Toyota B58H 3.0 L Turbo I6	71	(United States) Lucas Rowell	Am	7
(United States) BSG Motorsports	Mercedes-AMG GT4	Mercedes-AMG M178 4.0 L Turbo V8	81	(United States) Wes Humphryes	PA	6
(United States) BSG Motorsports	Mercedes-AMG GT4	Mercedes-AMG M178 4.0 L Turbo V8	81	(United States) Mike Ogren	PA	6
(United States) Stephen Cameron Racing	BMW M4 GT4 Evo (G82)	BMW S58B30T0 3.0 L Turbo I6	90	(United States) Gregory Liefooghe	PA	1–2, 4–7
(United States) Stephen Cameron Racing	BMW M4 GT4 Evo (G82)	BMW S58B30T0 3.0 L Turbo I6	90	(France) Jonathan Perichon	PA	1–2, 4–7
(United States) Random Vandals Racing	BMW M4 GT4 Evo (G82)	BMW S58B30T0 3.0 L Turbo I6	92	(United States) Patrick Hamner	Am	7
(United States) Random Vandals Racing	BMW M4 GT4 Evo (G82)	BMW S58B30T0 3.0 L Turbo I6	92	(United States) Paul Sparta	Am	7
(United States) Random Vandals Racing	BMW M4 GT4 Evo (G82)	BMW S58B30T0 3.0 L Turbo I6	94	(United States) Sam Craven	PA	All (Note: Kenton Koch was on the entry list for the Road America round, but was replaced by Thomas Merrill.)
(United States) Random Vandals Racing	BMW M4 GT4 Evo (G82)	BMW S58B30T0 3.0 L Turbo I6	94	(United States) Kenton Koch	PA	All
(United States) Random Vandals Racing	BMW M4 GT4 Evo (G82)	BMW S58B30T0 3.0 L Turbo I6	94	(United States) Thomas Merrill	PA	5
(United States) Random Vandals Racing	BMW M4 GT4 Evo (G82)	BMW S58B30T0 3.0 L Turbo I6	98	(United States) Bruno Colombo	S	All
(United States) Random Vandals Racing	BMW M4 GT4 Evo (G82)	BMW S58B30T0 3.0 L Turbo I6	98	(United States) Josh Green	S	All
(United States) Random Vandals Racing	BMW M4 GT4 Evo (G82)	BMW S58B30T0 3.0 L Turbo I6	188	(United States) Judson Holt	Am	All
(United States) Random Vandals Racing	BMW M4 GT4 Evo (G82)	BMW S58B30T0 3.0 L Turbo I6	188	(United States) Denny Stripling	Am	All
(United States) Advance Motorsports	McLaren Artura GT4	McLaren M630 3.0 L Turbo V6	131	(United States) Austin Jurs	S	1, 3–7
(United States) Advance Motorsports	McLaren Artura GT4	McLaren M630 3.0 L Turbo V6	131	(Canada) Jonathan Neudorf	S	1, 4
(United States) Advance Motorsports	McLaren Artura GT4	McLaren M630 3.0 L Turbo V6	131	(United States) Joseph Maley	S	3
(United States) Advance Motorsports	McLaren Artura GT4	McLaren M630 3.0 L Turbo V6	131	(United States) Parker Delong	S	5–7
(United States) LAP Motorsports	Ford Mustang GT4 (S650)	Ford Coyote 5.0 L V8	137	(United States) Casey Moyer	S	1
(United States) LAP Motorsports	Ford Mustang GT4 (S650)	Ford Coyote 5.0 L V8	137	(United States) Clayton Williams	S	1
(United States) LAP Motorsports	Ford Mustang GT4 (S650)	Ford Coyote 5.0 L V8	137	(United Kingdom) Freddie Tomlinson	PA	3
(United States) LAP Motorsports	Ford Mustang GT4 (S650)	Ford Coyote 5.0 L V8	137	(United Kingdom) Lawrence Tomlinson	PA	3
(United States) Flying Lizard Motorsports	BMW M4 GT4 (G82)	BMW S58B30T0 3.0 L Turbo I6	413	(United States) Zach Lumsden	Am	All
(United States) Flying Lizard Motorsports	BMW M4 GT4 (G82)	BMW S58B30T0 3.0 L Turbo I6	413	(United States) Kris Wilson	Am	All

Icon	Class
S	Silver Cup
PA	Pro-Am Cup
Am	Am Cup

- Craig Lumsden was scheduled to race in Flying Lizard Motorsports's lone BMW, but was replaced by Kris Wilson on the eve of the season.

== Race results ==
Bold indicates overall winner

Round		Circuit	Pole position	Silver Winners	Pro/Am Winners	Am Winners	Results
1	R1	(California) Sonoma	(United States) #68 RAFA Racing Team (Note: Jonathan Neudorf, in the #131 Advance Motorsports McLaren Artura GT4, originally qualified on pole, but was later disqualified for a data logger issue, relegating it to the back of the Silver class.)	**(United States) #68 RAFA Racing Team**	(United States) #47 NOLASPORT	(United States) #188 Random Vandals Racing	Report
1	R1	(California) Sonoma	(United States) Tyler Gonzalez **(United States) Westin Workman**	**(United States) Tyler Gonzalez** **(United States) Westin Workman**	(Brazil) Matheus Leist (United States) Matt Travis	(United States) Judson Holt (United States) Denny Stripling	Report
1	R2	(California) Sonoma		**(United States) #68 RAFA Racing Team**	(United States) #94 Random Vandals Racing	(United States) #188 Random Vandals Racing	Report
1	R2	(California) Sonoma		**(United States) Tyler Gonzalez** **(United States) Westin Workman**	(United States) Sam Craven (United States) Kenton Koch	(United States) Judson Holt (United States) Denny Stripling	Report
2	3H	(Texas) Austin	(United States) #68 RAFA Racing Team	**(United States) #68 RAFA Racing Team**	(United States) #82 BimmerWorld Racing	(United States) #36 BimmerWorld Racing	Report
2	3H	(Texas) Austin	(United States) Tyler Gonzalez **(United States) Westin Workman**	**(United States) Tyler Gonzalez** **(United States) Westin Workman**	(United States) Tyler McQuarrie (United States) James Walker Jr.	(United States) James Clay (United States) James Walker Jr.	Report
3	R1	(Florida) Sebring	(United States) #028 RS1	**(United States) #028 RS1**	(United States) #94 Random Vandals Racing	(United States) #36 BimmerWorld Racing	Report
3	R1	(Florida) Sebring	(United States) Luca Mars **(United States) Spencer Pumpelly**	**(United States) Luca Mars** **(United States) Spencer Pumpelly**	(United States) Sam Craven (United States) Kenton Koch	(United States) James Clay (United States) James Walker Jr.	Report
3	R2	(Florida) Sebring	(United States) #47 NOLASPORT	**(United States) #028 RS1**	(United States) #94 Random Vandals Racing	(United States) #21 ACI Motorsports	Report
3	R2	(Florida) Sebring	**(Brazil) Matheus Leist** (United States) Matt Travis	**(United States) Luca Mars** **(United States) Spencer Pumpelly**	(United States) Sam Craven (United States) Kenton Koch	(United States) Alex Garcia (United States) Michael Garcia	Report
4	R1	(Georgia (U.S. state)) Road Atlanta	(United States) #028 RS1	(United States) #028 RS1	**(United States) #33 Blackdog Racing**	(United States) #21 ACI Motorsports	Report
4	R1	(Georgia (U.S. state)) Road Atlanta	(United States) Luca Mars **(United States) Spencer Pumpelly**	(United States) Luca Mars (United States) Spencer Pumpelly	**(United States) Michael Cooper** **(United States) Tony Gaples**	(United States) Alex Garcia (United States) Michael Garcia	Report
4	R2	(Georgia (U.S. state)) Road Atlanta	(United States) #33 Blackdog Racing	**(United States) #028 RS1**	(United States) #33 Blackdog Racing	(United States) #21 ACI Motorsports	Report
4	R2	(Georgia (U.S. state)) Road Atlanta	**(United States) Michael Cooper** (United States) Tony Gaples	**(United States) Luca Mars** **(United States) Spencer Pumpelly**	(United States) Michael Cooper (United States) Tony Gaples	(United States) Alex Garcia (United States) Michael Garcia	Report
5	R1	(Wisconsin) Road America	(United States) #73 Kellymoss	(United States) #028 RS1	**(United States) #33 Blackdog Racing**	(United States) #30 TechSport Racing	Report
5	R1	(Wisconsin) Road America	**(United States) Riley Dickinson** (Canada) Erika Hoffmann	(United States) Luca Mars (United States) Spencer Pumpelly	**(United States) Michael Cooper** **(United States) Tony Gaples**	(United States) Frankie Muniz (United States) Tyler Stone	Report
5	R2	(Wisconsin) Road America	(United States) #33 Blackdog Racing	**(United States) #028 RS1**	(United States) #33 Blackdog Racing	(United States) #30 TechSport Racing	Report
5	R2	(Wisconsin) Road America	**(United States) Michael Cooper** (United States) Tony Gaples	**(United States) Luca Mars** **(United States) Spencer Pumpelly**	(United States) Michael Cooper (United States) Tony Gaples	(United States) Frankie Muniz (United States) Tyler Stone	Report
6	R1	(Alabama) Barber	(United States) #68 RAFA Racing Team	**(United States) #68 RAFA Racing Team**	(United States) #94 Random Vandals Racing	(United States) #21 ACI Motorsports	Report
6	R1	(Alabama) Barber	(United States) Tyler Gonzalez **(United States) Westin Workman**	**(United States) Tyler Gonzalez** **(United States) Westin Workman**	(United States) Sam Craven (United States) Kenton Koch	(United States) Alex Garcia (United States) Michael Garcia	Report
6	R2	(Alabama) Barber	(United States) #33 Blackdog Racing	**(United States) #7 ACI Motorsports**	(United States) #94 Random Vandals Racing	(United States) #30 TechSport Racing	Report
6	R2	(Alabama) Barber	**(United States) Michael Cooper** (United States) Tony Gaples	**(United States) Yves Baltas** **(United States) Trenton Estep**	(United States) Sam Craven (United States) Kenton Koch	(United States) Frankie Muniz (United States) Tyler Stone	Report
7	R1	(Indiana) Indianapolis	(United States) #68 RAFA Racing Team	**(United States) #68 RAFA Racing Team**	(United States) #33 Blackdog Racing	(United States) #30 TechSport Racing	Report
7	R1	(Indiana) Indianapolis	(United States) Tyler Gonzalez **(United States) Westin Workman**	**(United States) Tyler Gonzalez** **(United States) Westin Workman**	(United States) Michael Cooper (United States) Tony Gaples	(United States) Frankie Muniz (United States) Tyler Stone	Report
8	R2	(Indiana) Indianapolis	Not held (Note: Q2 was abandoned due to a failure in the scoring system, FP2 times were used to make up the grid for race two.)	(United States) #68 RAFA Racing Team	(United States) #39 Dome Motorsport	(United States) #37 Dome Motorsport	Report
8	R2	(Indiana) Indianapolis	Not held	**(United States) Tyler Gonzalez** **(United States) Westin Workman**	(United States) Marc Miller (United States) Allen Patten	(United States) Ed Killeen (United States) Laura Hayes	Report

== Championship standings ==
Points are awarded to the top ten finishers per class in each race.

Position		**1st**	**2nd**	**3rd**	**4th**	**5th**	**6th**	**7th**	**8th**	**9th**	**10th**
Points	1 hour	25	18	15	12	10	8	6	4	2	1
Points	3 hours	50	36	30	24	20	16	12	8	4	2

=== Drivers' championship ===
==== Silver Class ====
Pos.	Driver	1		2	3		4		5		6		7		Points
Pos.	Driver	(California) SON		(Texas) AUS	(Florida) SEB		(Georgia (U.S. state)) ATL		(Wisconsin) ELK		(Alabama) BAR		(Indiana) IND		Points
Pos.	Driver	R1	R2	R	R1	R2	R1	R2	R1	R2	R1	R2	R1	R2	Points
1	(United States) Luca Mars (United States) Spencer Pumpelly	3	4	1	**1**	**1**	**1**	**1**	1	1	5	7	6	7	259
2	(United States) Tyler Gonzalez (United States) Westin Workman	**1**	**1**	**3**	3	2	5	3	2	6	**1**	3	**1**	1	258
3	(United States) Francis Selldorff (United States) Kevin Boehm	2	2	5	2	8	2	2	6	5	2	4	5	4	192
4	(United States) Bruno Colombo (United States) Josh Green	4	3	2	8	3	3	6	3	4	3	6	4	9	165
5	(United States) Yves Baltas	5	7	7	4	4	8	7	5	2	6	1	3	2	144
6	(United States) Austin Jurs	9	9		5	5	4	8	4	**3**	4	**2**	2	8	124
7	(United States) Ashley Freiberg (United States) Loni Unser	7	6	6	6	6	7	4	7	8	7	5	8	5	110
8	(Dominican Republic) Jimmy Llibre	5	7	7	4	4	8	7	5	2					111
9	(Canada) Erika Hoffmann	8	8	4	7	7	6	5	**8**	7			7	6	92
10	(United States) Parker Delong								4	**3**	4	**2**	2	8	84
11	(United States) Riley Dickinson			4					**8**	7					38
12	(United States) Paul Bocuse				7	7	6	5							30
13	(Canada) Jonathan Neudorf	9	9				4	8							20
14	(United States) Joseph Maley				5	5									20
15	(United States) Casey Moyer (United States) Clayton Williams	6	5												16
16	(United States) Jack Parriott	8	8												8
Guest drivers ineligible to score points
–	(United States) Trenton Estep										6	1	3	2	–
–	(United States) Ismaeel Ellahi (United States) Ayrton Houk												9	3	–
–	(United States) Eric Filgueiras												7	6	–
Pos.	Driver	(California) SON		(Texas) AUS	(Florida) SEB		(Georgia (U.S. state)) ATL		(Wisconsin) ELK		(Alabama) BAR		(Indiana) IND		Points

Key
Colour	Result
Gold	Race winner
Silver	2nd place
Bronze	3rd place
Green	Points finish
Blue	Non-points finish
Blue	Non-classified finish (NC)
Purple	Did not finish (Ret)
Black	Disqualified (DSQ)
Black	Excluded (EX)
White	Did not start (DNS)
White	Race cancelled (C)
White	Withdrew (WD)
Blank	Did not participate

**Bold** – Pole
Italics – Fastest Lap

==== Pro-Am Class ====
Pos.	Driver	1		2	3		4		5		6		7		Points
Pos.	Driver	(California) SON		(Texas) AUS	(Florida) SEB		(Georgia (U.S. state)) ATL		(Wisconsin) ELK		(Alabama) BAR		(Indiana) IND		Points
Pos.	Driver	R1	R2	R	R1	R2	R1	R2	R1	R2	R1	R2	R1	R2	Points
1	(United States) Sam Craven	11	**1**	1	1	1	2	2	13	8	1	1	2	4	241
2	(United States) Kenton Koch	11	**1**	1	1	1	2	2			1	1	2	4	241
3	(United States) Michael Cooper (United States) Tony Gaples	12	2	Ret	3	3	1	**1**	**1**	**1**	2	**6**	1	3	214
4	(Brazil) Matheus Leist (United States) Matt Travis	1	4	2	7	**2**	**3**	10	5	Ret	3	3	11	2	170
5	(Canada) Damir Hot (New Zealand) Ryan Yardley	5	6	3	Ret	8	8	Ret	3	3	13	9	5	6	105
6	(United States) Allen Patten (United States) Marc Miller	**Ret**	Ret	**9**	**2**	4	5	3	12	Ret	Ret	10	**4**	1	98
7	(United States) Roland Krainz	4	3	Ret	4		4	8	2	5	5	Ret	9	12	93
8	(United States) Michael Petramalo (United States) Tyler McQuarrie	3	Ret	5	5	Ret	6	4	11	4	6	Ret	8	11	89
9	(United States) Karl Forman (United States) Ryan Eversley	6	5	6	10	6	14	5	4	9	8	5	DNS	8	86
10	(United States) Gregory Liefooghe (France) Jonathan Perichon	2	10	4			WD	WD	6	6	7	11	6	9	76
11	(United States) Michael Tosi (United States) Nolan Allaer						12	11	Ret	2	**4**	2	7	7	60
12	(United States) Harry Gottsacker (United States) Kevin Clifford	10	Ret		DNS	DNS	9	Ret	7	Ret	10	4	3	5	47
13	(United States) Eric Filgueiras (United States) Tom Kopzcynski	8	8	7	6	7	7	7	WD	WD					44
14	(United States) Chris Spada (Brazil) Werner Neugebauer	7	7	10	Ret	5	11	Ret	9	Ret	9	7	10	10	36
15	(United States) Jenson Altzman	9	9	8	8	Ret	10	6	10	7	11	Ret			30
16	(United States) Zachry Lee	9	9	8	8	Ret	10	6	10	7					30
17	(United States) Billy Johnson (United States) Christian Bach								8	10					5
18	(United Kingdom) Freddie Tomlinson (United Kingdom) Lawrence Tomlinson				9	9									4
19	(United States) Alessandro Chiocchetti (United States) Mason Filippi						13	9	Ret	DNS					1
20	(United Kingdom) Stuart McAleer					10									1
Guest drivers ineligible to score points
–	(United Kingdom) Stevan McAleer	4	3	Ret	4	10	4	8	2	5	5	Ret	9	12	–
–	(United States) Thomas Merrill								13	8					–
–	(Canada) Jaden Harry (United States) Joseph Maley										14	8			–
–	(Canada) Carlton MacFarlane										11	Ret			–
–	(United States) Wes Humphryes (United States) Mike Ogren										12	12			–
Pos.	Driver	(California) SON		(Texas) AUS	(Florida) SEB		(Georgia (U.S. state)) ATL		(Wisconsin) ELK		(Alabama) BAR		(Indiana) IND		Points

==== Am Class ====
Pos.	Driver	1		2	3		4		5		6		7		Points
Pos.	Driver	(California) SON		(Texas) AUS	(Florida) SEB		(Georgia (U.S. state)) ATL		(Wisconsin) ELK		(Alabama) BAR		(Indiana) IND		Points
Pos.	Driver	R1	R2	R	R1	R2	R1	R2	R1	R2	R1	R2	R1	R2	Points
1	(United States) Frankie Muniz (United States) Tyler Stone	2	4	4	8	6	6	3	1	1	9	1	2	2	204
2	(United States) James Clay (United States) James Walker Jr.	8	9	**1**	1	2	2	2	**7**	5	7	6	7	6	185
3	(United States) Alex Garcia (United States) Michael Garcia	**9**	2	9	**6**	**1**	**1**	**1**	9	**9**	**1**	2	**1**	9	183
4	(United States) Denny Stripling (United States) Judson Holt	1	**1**	7	3	4	3	9	4	4	5	**9**	5	4	174
5	(United States) Kris Wilson (United States) Zach Lumsden	7	3	3	4	8	4	5	2	2	3	3	6	7	161
6	(United States) Laura Hayes	3	5		WD	WD	7	4	5	3	6	4	10	1	118
7	(United States) Ed Killeen	3	5	5	WD	WD	7	4	5	3	6	4	10	1	113
8	(United States) Anthony Geraci			2	2	3			3	6			13	5	107
9	(United States) Joseph Catania (United States) Lucas Catania	6	7		5	5	5	6	6	8	2	5	3	DNS	107
10	(United States) Muzaffar Gafurov	5	8	8	7	7	8	8	8	7	4	8	8	8	84
11	(United States) Ross Poole	5	8	8	7	7			8	7	4	8	8	8	76
12	(United States) Kenny Schmied				2	3			3	6			13	5	71
13	(United States) Sam Owen (United States) Sean Gibbons	4	6	6	WD	WD	9	7					9	11	50
14	(United States) Rafael Martinez			2											36
15	(Canada) Ron Tomlinson			5											20
16	(United States) Curt Swearingin						8	8							8
Guest drivers ineligible to score points
–	(Canada) Carlton MacFarlane (United States) Zachry Lee												11	3	–
–	(United States) John Dean (United States) Lucas Rowell												4	12	–
–	(United States) Christian Pipas (United States) Mike Fitzpatrick										8	7			–
–	(United States) Patrick Hamner (United States) Paul Sparta												12	10	–
Pos.	Driver	(California) SON		(Texas) AUS	(Florida) SEB		(Georgia (U.S. state)) ATL		(Wisconsin) ELK		(Alabama) BAR		(Indiana) IND		Points

== See also ==
- 2026 British GT Championship
- 2026 GT4 European Series
- 2026 French GT4 Cup
- 2026 GT4 Italian Series
- 2026 GT4 Australia Series
- 2026 SRO GT Cup
- 2026 SRO Japan Cup
