= 2023 Porsche Supercup =

Sports car racing event

The 2023 Porsche Mobil 1 Supercup was the 31st Porsche Supercup season, a stock car racing series sanctioned by Porsche Motorsports GmbH in the world. It started on 26 May at Monte Carlo, Monaco and ended 3 September at the Autodromo Nazionale di Monza, Italy, after eight races, all of which were support events for the 2023 Formula One Season.

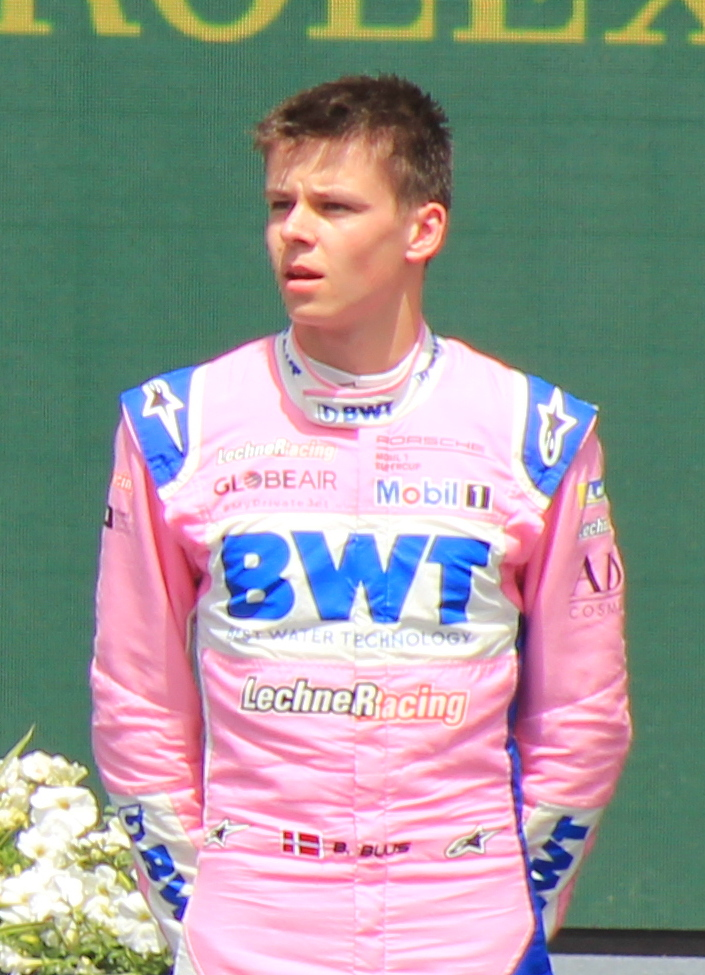
Bastian Buus (pictured in 2022) won the Drivers' Championship title.

== Teams and drivers ==
Team	No.	Drivers	Class	Rounds
(Austria) BWT Lechner Racing	1	(Denmark) Bastian Buus		All
(Austria) BWT Lechner Racing	2	(Australia) Harri Jones	R	All
(Austria) BWT Lechner Racing	3	(United Kingdom) Harry King		All
(Switzerland) Fach Auto Tech	4	(Netherlands) Morris Schuring		All
(Switzerland) Fach Auto Tech	5	(Switzerland) Alexander Fach		All
(Switzerland) Fach Auto Tech	6	(United Kingdom) Gustav Burton	R	All
(Switzerland) Fach Auto Tech	34	(Switzerland) Peter Hegglin	G	2
(Switzerland) Fach Auto Tech	34	(Switzerland) Jan Klingelnberg	G	5
(Germany) Huber Racing	7	(Germany) Leon Köhler		All
(Germany) Huber Racing	8	(Italy) Simone Iaquinta		All
(Germany) Huber Racing	41	(United Arab Emirates) Bashar Mardini	G	5–8
(Germany) Team Huber Racing	9	(Spain) Jorge Lorenzo		1–2, 4–8
(Germany) Team Huber Racing	9	(United Kingdom) Josh Stanton	G	3
(Germany) Team Huber Racing	10	(Argentina) Pablo Marcelo Otero		1
(Germany) Team Huber Racing	10	(Austria) Horst Felix Felbermayr	G	2
(Germany) Team Huber Racing	10	(Venezuela) Angel Benitez	G	3
(Germany) Team Huber Racing	10	(Venezuela) Juan Manuel Lonjon	G	4–5
(Germany) Team Huber Racing	10	(Venezuela) Javier Ripoll Sanchez	G	6–8
(Germany) Team Huber Racing	35	(Austria) Luca Rettenbacher	G	2
(Germany) Team Huber Racing	44	(Netherlands) Flynt Schuring	G	6–7
(France) CLRT	11	(France) Dorian Boccolacci		All
(France) CLRT	12	(Belgium) Benjamin Paque	R	All
(France) CLRT	13	(Netherlands) Michael Verhagen		All
(Italy) Dinamic GT	14	(Netherlands) Jaap van Lagen		All
(Italy) Dinamic GT	15	(Italy) Giorgio Amati	R	All
(Italy) Dinamic GT	16	(Italy) Gianmarco Quaresmini		1–2, 4–8
(Italy) Dinamic GT	16	(United Kingdom) Angus Whiteside	G	3
(Italy) Dinamic GT	36	(Italy) Aldo Festante	G	2
(Italy) Ombra Racing	17	(North Macedonia) Risto Vukov		All
(Italy) Ombra Racing	18	(South Africa) Keagan Masters	R	All
(Italy) Ombra Racing	19	(Italy) Riccardo Pera	R	1–2
(Italy) Ombra Racing	19	(France) Marvin Klein	G	3–8
(Italy) Ombra Racing	29	(Italy) Alberto Cerqui	G	5
(France) Pierre Martinet by Alméras	20	(Norway) Roar Lindland	PA	All
(France) Pierre Martinet by Alméras	21	(United States) Yves Baltas	R	All
(France) Martinet by Alméras	22	(France) Alessandro Ghiretti	R	All
(France) Martinet by Alméras	23	(Finland) Jukka Honkavuori		All
(France) Martinet by Alméras	46	(China) Luo Kailuo	G	8
(Netherlands) Team GP Elite	24	(Netherlands) Loek Hartog		All
(Netherlands) Team GP Elite	25	(Netherlands) Larry ten Voorde		All
(Netherlands) Team GP Elite	26	(Netherlands) Lucas Groeneveld		All
(Netherlands) GP Elite	27	(Belgium) Ghislain Cordeel	R	All
(Netherlands) GP Elite	28	(Netherlands) Huub van Eijndhoven	R	All
(Netherlands) GP Elite	33	(Germany) Sören Spreng	G	2, 4
(Netherlands) GP Elite	42	(Netherlands) Niels Troost	G	6–7
(Netherlands) GP Elite	43	(Netherlands) Lucas van Eijndhoven	G	6–7
(Switzerland) Porsche Cup Suisse	34	(Switzerland) Peter Hegglin	G	8
(Switzerland) Porsche Cup Suisse	45	(Germany) Alexander Schwarzer	G	8
(United Kingdom) Richardson Racing	37	(United Kingdom) Ross Wylie	G	3
(United Kingdom) Richardson Racing	38	(Netherlands) Robert de Haan	G	3
(United Kingdom) Team Parker Racing	39	(United Kingdom) Adam Smalley	G	3
(United Kingdom) Team Parker Racing	40	(United Kingdom) Will Aspin	G	3
(Germany) Porsche Motorsport	911	(Germany) Timo Glock	G	4, 8

Icon	Class
PA	Pro-Am Cup
R	Rookie
G	Guest

== Race calendar and results ==
Round	Circuit	Date	Pole position	Fastest lap	Winning driver	Winning team
1	Circuit de Monaco, Monte Carlo	25–28 May	(Netherlands) Larry ten Voorde	(Netherlands) Loek Hartog	(United Kingdom) Harry King	(Austria) BWT Lechner Racing
2	(Austria) Red Bull Ring, Spielberg	30 June–2 July	(Netherlands) Larry ten Voorde	(Denmark) Bastian Buus	(Denmark) Bastian Buus	(Austria) BWT Lechner Racing
3	(United Kingdom) Silverstone Circuit, Silverstone	7–9 July	(France) Dorian Boccolacci	(Denmark) Bastian Buus	(Switzerland) Alexander Fach	(Switzerland) Fach Auto Tech
4	(Hungary) Hungaroring, Budapest	21–23 July	(United Kingdom) Harry King	(United Kingdom) Harry King	(United Kingdom) Harry King	(Austria) BWT Lechner Racing
5	(Belgium) Circuit de Spa-Francorchamps, Stavelot	28–30 July	(Netherlands) Morris Schuring	(Denmark) Bastian Buus	(Netherlands) Morris Schuring	(Switzerland) Fach Auto Tech
6	(Netherlands) Circuit Zandvoort, Zandvoort	25–27 August	(Netherlands) Morris Schuring	(Netherlands) Morris Schuring	(Netherlands) Morris Schuring	(Switzerland) Fach Auto Tech
7	(Netherlands) Circuit Zandvoort, Zandvoort	25–27 August	(Netherlands) Loek Hartog	(Netherlands) Loek Hartog	(Netherlands) Loek Hartog	(Netherlands) Team GP Elite
8	(Italy) Autodromo Nazionale di Monza, Monza	1–3 September	(United Kingdom) Harry King	(Denmark) Bastian Buus	(United Kingdom) Harry King	(Austria) BWT Lechner Racing

== Championship standings ==
=== Scoring system ===
Points were awarded to the top fifteen classified drivers in every race, using the following system:

Position	**1st**	**2nd**	**3rd**	**4th**	**5th**	**6th**	**7th**	**8th**	**9th**	**10th**	**11th**	**12th**	**13th**	**14th**	**15th**	**Ref**
Points	25	20	17	14	12	10	9	8	7	6	5	4	3	2	1	

In order for full points to be awarded, the race winner must complete at least 50% of the scheduled race distance. Half points are awarded if the race winner completes less than 50% of the race distance. In the event of a tie at the conclusion of the championship, a count-back system is used as a tie-breaker, with a driver's/constructor's best result used to decide the standings.

Guest drivers are ineligible to score points. If a guest driver finishes in first position, the second-placed finisher will receive 25 points. The same goes for every other points scoring position. So if three guest drivers end up placed fourth, fifth and sixth, the seventh-placed finisher will receive fourteen points and so forth - until the eighteenth-placed finisher receives the final point.

=== Drivers' Championship ===
Pos.	Driver	MON (Monaco)	AUT (Austria)	GBR (United Kingdom)	HUN (Hungary)	SPA (Belgium)	ZND (Netherlands)		MNZ (Italy)	Points
1	(Denmark) Bastian Buus	3	1	13	3	2	4	2	13	122
2	(Netherlands) Larry ten Voorde	**2**	**2**	27†	4	7	3	3	2	117
3	(United Kingdom) Harry King	1	10	Ret	**1**	4	Ret	5	**1**	108
4	(Netherlands) Morris Schuring	6	19	9	7	**1**	**1**	4	5	103
5	(France) Dorian Boccolacci	5	4	**11**	2	3	14	10	Ret	79
6	(Netherlands) Loek Hartog	4	Ret	10	16	10	2	**1**	Ret	75
7	(France) Alessandro Ghiretti	Ret	7	3	Ret	5	5	6	Ret	64
8	(Switzerland) Alexander Fach	14	Ret	1	9	17	7	8	6	63
9	(Australia) Harri Jones	9	Ret	7	6	6	10	12	4	63
10	(South Africa) Keagan Masters	Ret	18	4	12	22	9	9	9	45
11	(Netherlands) Jaap van Lagen	10	9	5	21	14	13	13	12	44
12	(Italy) Simone Iaquinta	Ret	12	Ret	8	20	11	11	3	42
13	(Netherlands) Huub van Eijndhoven	7	5	21	11	16	6	20	23†	39
14	(Germany) Leon Köhler	Ret	3	6	19	8	WD	WD	DNS	37
15	(Belgium) Benjamin Paque	13	11	8	5	12	22	15	Ret	37
16	(Italy) Giorgio Amati	8	14	14	Ret	18	15	23	7	26
17	(United Kingdom) Gustav Burton	15	Ret	17	13	13	12	14	16	21
18	(Finland) Jukka Honkavuori	19	8	DSQ	23	25	Ret	17	10	15
19	(Italy) Gianmarco Quaresmini	11	25		Ret	11	21	19	22†	11
20	(Belgium) Ghislain Cordeel	17	16	Ret	Ret	21	Ret	16	8	10
21	(Italy) Riccardo Pera	12	13		WD					8
22	(North Macedonia) Risto Vukov	18	28	20	14	29	19	28†	17	4
23	(Netherlands) Michael Verhagen	16	21	22	20	28	18	26	14	3
24	(Spain) Jorge Lorenzo	Ret	15		Ret	23	16	21	24†	3
25	(United States) Yves Baltas	Ret	23	23	22	27	Ret	22	15	2
26	(Netherlands) Lucas Groeneveld	Ret	17	18	Ret	19	Ret	18	Ret	2
27	(Norway) Roar Lindland	Ret	22	24	17	26	20	25	20	1
-	(Argentina) Pablo Marcelo Otero	DNS								0
Guest drivers ineligible for points
-	(Netherlands) Robert de Haan			2						-
-	(Austria) Luca Rettenbacher		6							-
-	(France) Marvin Klein			15	10	9	8	7	Ret	-
-	(Germany) Timo Glock				15				11	-
-	(United Kingdom) Adam Smalley			12						-
-	(Italy) Alberto Cerqui					15				-
-	(United Kingdom) Ross Wylie			16						-
-	(Netherlands) Flynt Schuring						17	24		-
-	(United Arab Emirates) Bashar Mardini					24	Ret	27	18	-
-	(Germany) Sören Spreng		24		18					-
-	(United Kingdom) Will Aspin			19						-
-	(Germany) Alexander Schwarzer								19	-
-	(Italy) Aldo Festante		20							-
-	(Switzerland) Peter Hegglin		26						21	-
-	(United Kingdom) Josh Stanton			25						-
-	(Venezuela) Angel Benitez			26						-
-	(Austria) Horst Felix Felbermayr		27							-
-	(United Kingdom) Angus Whiteside			Ret						-
-	(Switzerland) Jan Klingelnberg					Ret				-
-	(Netherlands) Niels Troost						Ret	Ret		-
-	(Netherlands) Lucas van Eijndhoven						Ret	Ret		-
-	(Venezuela) Juan Manuel Lonjon				DNS	DNS				-
-	(China) Luo Kailuo								DNS	-
-	(Venezuela) Javier Ripoll Sanchez						WD	WD	DNS	-
Pos.	Driver	MON (Monaco)	AUT (Austria)	GBR (United Kingdom)	HUN (Hungary)	SPA (Belgium)	ZND (Netherlands)		MNZ (Italy)	Points

Colour	Result
Gold	Winner
Silver	Second place
Bronze	Third place
Green	Points classification
Blue	Non-points classification
Blue	Non-classified finish (NC)
Purple	Retired, not classified (Ret)
Red	Did not qualify (DNQ)
Red	Did not pre-qualify (DNPQ)
Black	Disqualified (DSQ)
White	Did not start (DNS)
White	Withdrew (WD)
White	Race cancelled (C)
Blank	Did not practice (DNP)
Blank	Did not arrive (DNA)
Blank	Excluded (EX)

**Bold** – Pole
Italics – Fastest Lap

Notes

† – Driver did not finish the race, but were classified as they completed over 75% of the race distance.

=== Rookie Championship ===
Pos.	Driver	MON (Monaco)	AUT (Austria)	GBR (United Kingdom)	HUN (Hungary)	SPA (Belgium)	ZND (Netherlands)		MNZ (Italy)	Points
1	(France) Alessandro Ghiretti	Ret	7	3	Ret	6	5	6	Ret	64
2	(Australia) Harri Jones	9	Ret	7	6	7	10	12	4	63
3	(South Africa) Keagan Masters	Ret	18	4	12	21	9	9	9	45
4	(Netherlands) Huub van Eijndhoven	7	5	21	11	16	6	20	23†	39
5	(Belgium) Benjamin Paque	13	11	8	5	12	22	15	Ret	37
6	(Italy) Giorgio Amati	8	14	14	Ret	18	15	23	7	26
7	(United Kingdom) Gustav Burton	15	Ret	17	13	14	12	14	16	21
8	(Belgium) Ghislain Cordeel	17	16	Ret	Ret	22	Ret	16	8	10
9	(Italy) Riccardo Pera	12	13		WD					8
10	(United States) Yves Baltas	Ret	23	23	22	28	Ret	22	15	2
Pos.	Driver	MON (Monaco)	AUT (Austria)	GBR (United Kingdom)	HUN (Hungary)	SPA (Belgium)	ZND (Netherlands)		MNZ (Italy)	Points

=== Teams' Championship ===
Pos.	Team	Points
1	(Austria) BWT Lechner Racing	230
2	(Netherlands) Team GP Elite	190
3	(Switzerland) Fach Auto Tech	167
4	(France) CLRT	112
5	(Italy) Ombra Racing	83
6	(France) Martinet by Alméras	79
7	(Germany) Huber Racing	77
8	(Italy) Dinamic GT	62
9	(Netherlands) GP Elite	46
10	(France) Pierre Martinet by Alméras	2
11	(Germany) Team Huber Racing	2
