= Yves Baltas =

American racing driver (born 2002)

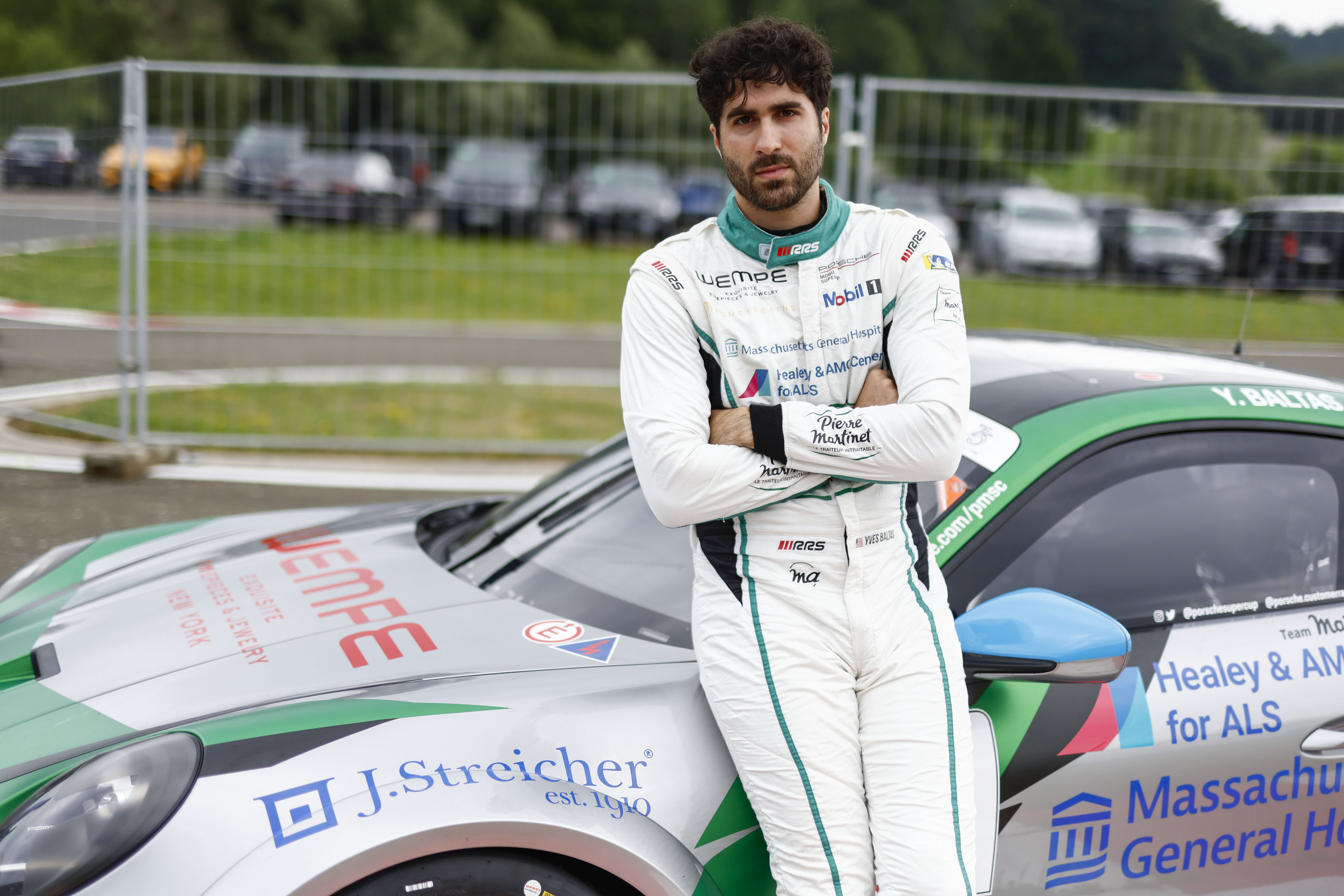
- Baltas in 2023
- Nationality: (United States) American
- Born: February 15, 2002 (age 24) New York City, New York, U.S.
- Categorisation: FIA Silver

Yves Baltas (born February 15, 2002) is an American racing driver who competes in GT World Challenge America for ACI Motorsports.

== Career ==
Baltas grew up on the Upper West Side of New York City, but moved to the United Kingdom at the age of 14 to pursue racing intensively.

Baltas made his car racing debut in 2017, racing in the F4 British Championship for TRS Arden Junior Racing Team, following a year of testing for them as part of their Young Driver Programme. Competing in the first two rounds, Baltas achieved a best result of sixth in race three at Donington Park before leaving the team and the series ahead of the Thruxton round.

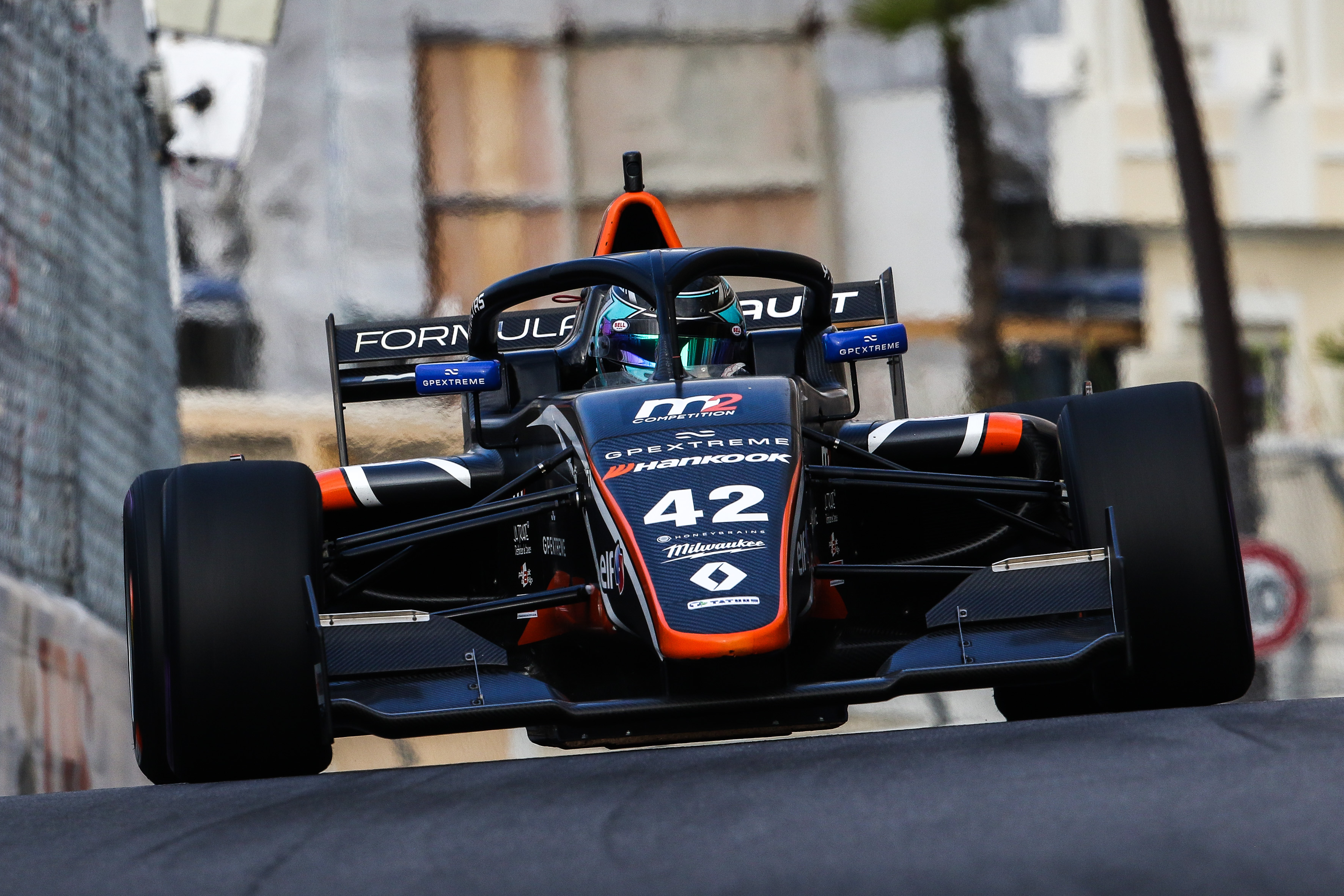
Baltas at Monaco as part of the 2019 Formula Renault Eurocup.

At the start of the following year, Baltas joined Fortec Motorsports to compete in the Euroformula Open Championship, but opted to switch to Campos Racing shortly before the season began. Racing in the first five rounds, Baltas scored a best result of seventh at both the Hungaroring and Silverstone, before leaving the team and series ahead of the round at Monza. Baltas then returned to racing in 2019, joining M2 Competition to race in the Formula Renault Eurocup. Partaking in the first three rounds, Baltas achieved a best result of ninth in race two at Silverstone and leaving the team and series following the Monaco round.

Following a year spent sim racing, Baltas joined B-Max Racing to compete in the 2021 Super Formula Championship. After missing the first rounds due to travel restrictions, Baltas received his visa to enter Japan ahead of the second Motegi round, but ultimately did not enter the country after a member of his family tested positive for COVID-19, and was forced to sit out the full season.

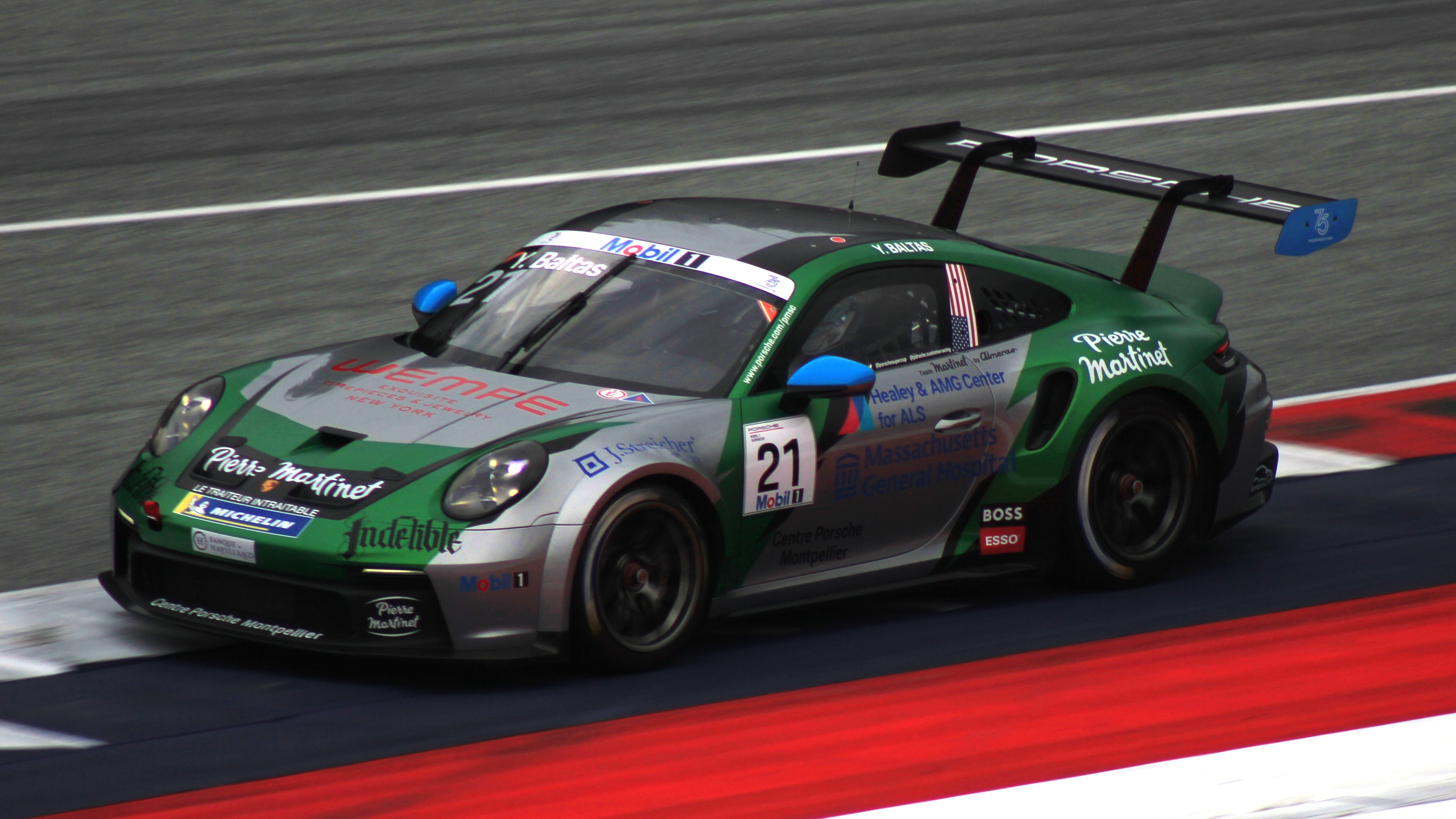
Baltas racing in Porsche Supercup at Red Bull Ring in 2023.

Another year on the sidelines then ensued, before Baltas returned to racing in 2023, by joining Pierre Martinet by Alméras to compete in Porsche Supercup. On his return to racing, Baltas scored a best result of 15th at the finale in Monza, which served as his only points finish of the season as he was 25th in the standings on two points. Remaining in Carrera Cup competition for 2024, Baltas switched to its North American counterpart for 2024 as he joined MDK Motorsports for his rookie year in the series. Racing with the Mark Kvamme-led team through the first four rounds, Baltas had his breakout round of the season in Canada, where he won race one and finished second in race two. Following MDK's withdrawal from the series, Baltas joined GMG Racing for the Road America round, before contesting the final three rounds with ACI Motorsports en route to a seventh-place points finish.

Continuing in the series for 2025, Baltas remained with ACI Motorsports for his sophomore year, this time as a member of the Porsche North America Junior Program. In his second season in the series, Baltas won both races at Miami to end the year seventh in points for the second consecutive year. The following year, Baltas remained with ACI as he transitioned to the GT4 America Series alongside Jimmy Llibre. After a quiet start to the season, Llibre left the team and was replaced by Trenton Estep, who helped Baltas secure his only win of the season at Barber en route to fifth in the Silver class points.

Remaining with ACI through 2027, Baltas moved up to GT World Challenge America, driving a Mercedes-AMG GT3 Evo alongside Matt Smith.

== Racing record ==
=== Racing career summary ===
Season	Series	Team	Races	Wins	Poles	F/Laps	Podiums	Points	Position
2017	F4 British Championship	TRS Arden Junior Racing Team	6	0	0	0	0	4	19th
2018	Euroformula Open Championship	Campos Racing	10	0	0	0	0	18	16th
2019	Formula Renault Eurocup	M2 Competition	6	0	0	0	0	3	19th
2023	Porsche Supercup	Pierre Martinet by Alméras	8	0	0	0	0	2	25th
2024	Porsche Carrera Cup North America	MDK Motorsports	8	1	0	1	2	133	7th
2024	Porsche Carrera Cup North America	GMG Racing	2	0	0	0	0	133	7th
2024	Porsche Carrera Cup North America	ACI Motorsports	6	0	0	0	0	133	7th
2025	Porsche Carrera Cup North America	ACI Motorsports	16	2	0	0	2	151	7th
2026	GT4 America Series – Silver	ACI Motorsports	13	1	0	0	4	144	5th
2026	Porsche Endurance Challenge North America – GT3 Cup Pro-Am		3	0	0	0	0	65	10th
2026	Porsche Endurance Challenge North America – Cayman Pro-Am		1	0	0	0	0	42	6th
2027	GT World Challenge America – Pro-Am	ACI Motorsports						*	*

=== Complete F4 British Championship results ===
(key) (Races in bold indicate pole position; races in italics indicate fastest lap)

Year	Team	1	2	3	4	5	6	7	8	9	10	11	12	13	14	15	16	17	18	19	20	21	22	23	24	25	26	27	28	29	30	31	DC	Points
2017	TRS Arden Junior Racing Team	BRI; 1; 13	BRI; 2 Ret	BRI; 3; 13	DON; 1 Ret	DON; 2 Ret	DON; 3; 6	THR; 1	THR; 2	THR; 3	OUL; 1	OUL; 2	OUL; 3	CRO; 1	CRO; 2	CRO; 3	SNE; 1	SNE; 2	SNE; 3	KNO; 1	KNO; 2	KNO; 3	KNO; 4	ROC; 1	ROC; 2	ROC; 3	SIL; 1	SIL; 2	SIL; 3	BHGP; 1	BHGP; 2	BHGP; 3	19th	4

=== Complete Euroformula Open Championship results ===
(key) (Races in bold indicate pole position) (Races in italics indicate fastest lap)

Year	Entrant	1	2	3	4	5	6	7	8	9	10	11	12	13	14	15	16	Pos	Points
2018	Campos Racing	EST; 1; 9	EST; 2; 15	LEC; 1 Ret	LEC; 2; 13	SPA; 1 Ret	SPA; 2; 13	HUN; 1; 7	HUN; 2; 12	SIL; 1; 8	SIL; 2; 7	MNZ; 1	MNZ; 2	JER; 1	JER; 2	CAT; 1	CAT; 2	16th	18

=== Complete Formula Renault Eurocup results ===
(key) (Races in bold indicate pole position) (Races in italics indicate fastest lap)

Year	Team	1	2	3	4	5	6	7	8	9	10	11	12	13	14	15	16	17	18	19	20	Pos	Points
2019	M2 Competition	MNZ; 1; 10	MNZ; 2 Ret	SIL; 1; 11	SIL; 2; 9	MON; 1; 16	MON; 2; 17	LEC; 1	LEC; 2	SPA; 1	SPA; 2	NÜR; 1	NÜR; 2	HUN; 1	HUN; 2	CAT; 1	CAT; 2	HOC; 1	HOC; 2	YMC; 1	YMC; 2	19th	3

=== Complete Porsche Supercup results ===
(key) (Races in bold indicate pole position) (Races in italics indicate fastest lap)

Year	Team	1	2	3	4	5	6	7	8	DC	Points
2023	Pierre Martinet by Alméras	MON; Ret	RBR; 23	SIL; 23	HUN; 22	SPA; 27	ZND; Ret	ZND; 22	MNZ; 15	25th	2

=== Complete Porsche Carrera Cup North America results ===
(key) (Races in bold indicate pole position) (Races in italics indicate fastest lap)

Year	Team	Class	1	2	3	4	5	6	7	8	9	10	11	12	13	14	15	16	Pos	Points
2024	MDK Motorsports	Pro	SEB; 1; 9	SEB; 2; 10	MIA; 1; 7	MIA; 2; 8	CGV; 1; 1	CGV; 2; 2	WGL; 1; 9	WGL; 2; 11									7th	133
2024	GMG Racing	Pro									ROA; 1; 11	ROA; 2; 12							7th	133
2024	ACI Motorsports	Pro											IMS; 1; 27	IMS; 2; 17	ATL; 1; 6	ATL; 2; 5	COT; 1; 7	COT; 2; 9	7th	133
2025	ACI Motorsports	Pro	SEB; 1; 7	SEB; 2; 8	MIA; 1; 1	MIA; 2; 1	CGV; 1; 7	CGV; 2; 5	WGL; 1; 8	WGL; 2; 4	ROA; 1; 8	ROA; 2; 8	IMS; 1; 23	IMS; 2; 6	ATL; 1; 11	ATL; 2; 6	COT; 1; 19	COT; 2; 22	7th	151
