= 2024 Porsche Carrera Cup North America =

Motor racing competition

The 2024 Porsche Carrera Cup North America, known as the 2024 Porsche Deluxe Carrera Cup North America for sponsorship reasons, was the fourth season of the Porsche Carrera Cup North America. It began on March 13 at Sebring International Raceway and ended on October 20 at Circuit of the Americas.

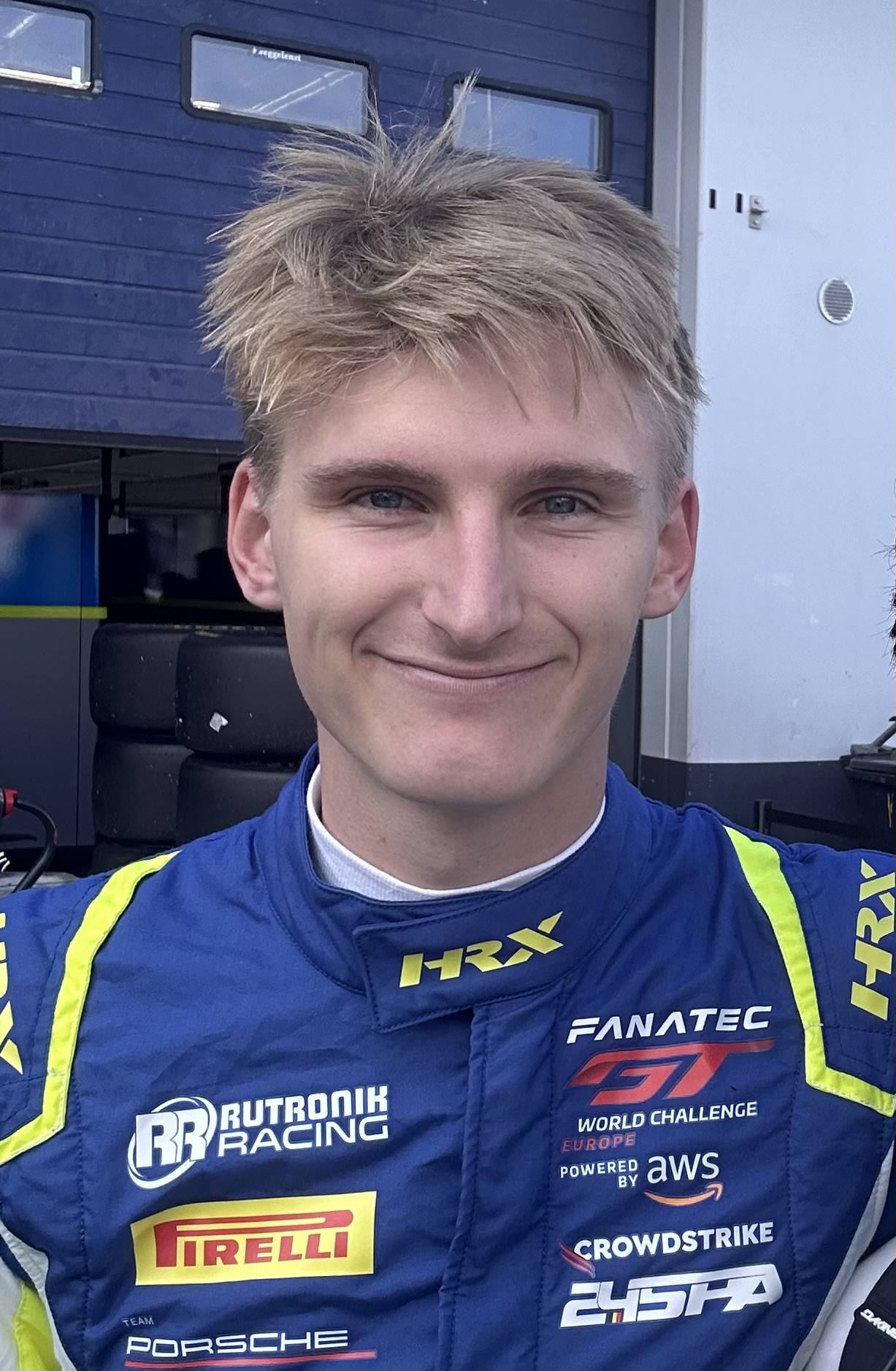
Loek Hartog (pictured in 2024) won the Drivers' Championship title

== Calendar ==
The calendar was released on October 23, 2023, featuring eight rounds. The rounds at WeatherTech Raceway Laguna Seca and the Grand Prix of Long Beach were dropped in favor of a round at the Canadian Grand Prix, alongside a return to Road Atlanta. A new sub-championship, dubbed the ANDIAL Cup, was introduced at the IMSA-supporting rounds.

Round	Circuit	Date
1	(United States) Sebring International Raceway, Sebring, Florida	March 13–15
2	(United States) Miami International Autodrome, Miami Gardens, Florida	May 3–5
3	(Canada) Circuit Gilles Villeneuve, Montreal, Quebec	June 7–9
4	(United States) Watkins Glen International, Watkins Glen, New York	June 20–22
5	(United States) Road America, Elkhart Lake, Wisconsin	August 2–4
6	(United States) Indianapolis Motor Speedway, Speedway, Indiana	September 20–22
7	(United States) Road Atlanta, Braselton, Georgia	October 9–11
8	(United States) Circuit of the Americas, Austin, Texas	October 18–20

Race is part of ANDIAL Cup

== Series news ==
- Following three years of competition using Michelin tires, Yokohama became the official tire supplier ahead of the 2024 season.

== Entry list ==
Team	No.	Driver	Rounds
Pro Class
(United States) ACI Motorsports	2	(Dominican Republic) Jimmy Llibre	All
(United States) ACI Motorsports	15	(United States) Yves Baltas	6–8
(United States) JDX Racing	4	(United States) Elias De La Torre IV	All
(United States) JDX Racing	9	(Canada) Zachary Vanier	All
(United States) JDX Racing	82	(New Zealand) Madeline Stewart	All
(United States) JDX Racing	98	(United Kingdom) Alex Sedgwick	All
(United States) Momentop FMS Motorsport x RGB Racing	5	(Venezuela) Ángel Benítez	1–4, 6–8
(United States) Momentop FMS Motorsport x RGB Racing	27	(Germany) Thomas Kiefer	8
(United States) Momentop FMS Motorsport x RGB Racing	91	(Netherlands) Michael Verhagen	2
(United States) McCann Racing	8	(United States) Michael McCann	1–4
(United States) Kellymoss	8	(United States) Michael McCann	5–8
(United States) Kellymoss	24	(Netherlands) Loek Hartog	All
(United States) Kellymoss	85	(United States) Jake Pedersen	2–8
(United States) GMG Racing	15	(United States) Yves Baltas	5
(United States) MDK Motorsports	15	(United States) Yves Baltas	1–4
(United States) MDK Motorsports	20	(United Kingdom) Gustav Burton	1–3
(United States) MDK Motorsports	37	(United States) Sabré Cook	1–4
(United States) MDK Motorsports	64	(United Kingdom) Dan Clarke	1–4
(United States) Era Motorsport	37	(United States) Sabré Cook	5–8
(United States) Era Motorsport	64	(United Kingdom) Dan Clarke	5–8
(United States) Topp Racing Performance	77	(United States) Colin Kaminsky	All
(United States) Topp Racing Performance	78	(New Zealand) Ryan Yardley	All
(United States) Rearden Racing	85	(United States) Jake Pedersen	1
(United States) Baby Bull Racing	88	(United States) Michael Cooper	All
Pro-Am Class
(United States) GMG Racing	3	(United States) Ofir Levy	2–3
(United States) GMG Racing	14	(United States) James Sofronas	1–3, 5, 8
(United States) Forward Motorsport	11	(Germany) Peter Ludwig	1–4
(United States) ACI Motorsports	16	(Switzerland) Pedro Torres	1, 4–7
(United States) ACI Motorsports	26	(Canada) Roberto Tutino	1–5
(United States) ACI Motorsports	84	(Canada) Marco Cirone	All
(United States) Kellymoss	23	(United States) Jordan Wallace	1–6, 8
(United States) Kellymoss	65	(Dominican Republic) Efrin Castro	All
(United States) Kellymoss	99	(United States) Alan Metni	All
(United States) Momentop FMS Motorsport x RGB Racing	27	(Kyrgyzstan) Stanislav Minskiy	6
(United States) Momentop FMS Motorsport x RGB Racing	66	(United States) David Tuaty	2
(United States) Momentop FMS Motorsport x RGB Racing	91	(Venezuela) Javier Ripoll Sanchez	1, 4, 6–8
(United States) Momentop FMS Motorsport x RGB Racing	91	(Portugal) Andre Renha Fernandes	3
(United States) Baby Bull Racing	44	(United States) Moisey Uretsky	All
(United States) Topp Racing Performance	56	(United States) Jeff Mosing	All
(United States) BGB Motorsports	69	(United States) Thomas Collingwood	1–2
(United States) MDK Motorsports	74	(San Marino) Kenton King	1–4
(United States) Era Motorsport	74	(San Marino) Kenton King	5
(United States) Era Motorsport	74	(United States) Josh Conley	8
Masters Class
(United States) MGM Racing	10	(United States) Jody Miller	4–5, 7–8
(United States) Topp Racing	12	(United States) Peter Atwater	8
(United States) Kellymoss	13	(United States) Todd Parriott	1, 5–6, 8
(United States) Kellymoss	57	(United States) John Goetz	All
(United States) Kellymoss	68	(United States) Chris Bellomo	All
(United States) Kellymoss	80	(United States) John Gilliland	8
(United States) ACI Motorsports	18	(United States) Richard Edge	1, 4–7
(United States) ACI Motorsports	19	(United States) Tom Balames	1–2, 4–5, 8
(United States) ACI Motorsports	55	(United States) Matt Halcome	All
(United States) Alegra Motorsports, LLC	22	(United States) Carlos de Quesada	1–5
(United States) GMG Racing	32	(United States) Kyle Washington	1–3, 5, 8
(United States) MDK Motorsports	43	(United States) Mark Kvamme	1–4
(United States) MDK Motorsports	46	(United States) Naveen Rao	1
(United States) Ruckus Racing	45	(United States) Scott Blind	1–2, 4–8
(United States) JDX Racing	70	(United States) Joel Johnson	8

== Results ==
Round	Circuit	Date	Pole position	Fastest lap	Winning driver	Winning team	Winning Pro-Am	Winning Masters
1	(United States) Sebring International Raceway, Sebring, Florida	March 13–15	(Netherlands) Loek Hartog	(Netherlands) Loek Hartog	(Netherlands) Loek Hartog	(United States) Kellymoss	(United States) James Sofronas	(United States) Matt Halcome
2	(United States) Sebring International Raceway, Sebring, Florida	March 13–15	(United Kingdom) Gustav Burton	(Netherlands) Loek Hartog	(United Kingdom) Gustav Burton	(United States) MDK Motorsports	(United States) Alan Metni	(United States) Matt Halcome
3	(United States) Miami International Autodrome, Miami Gardens, Florida	May 5–7	(United Kingdom) Alex Sedgwick	(United Kingdom) Gustav Burton	(Netherlands) Loek Hartog	(United States) Kellymoss	(Dominican Republic) Efrin Castro	(United States) Mark Kvamme
4	(United States) Miami International Autodrome, Miami Gardens, Florida	May 5–7	(United Kingdom) Alex Sedgwick	(Netherlands) Loek Hartog	(Canada) Zachary Vanier	(United States) JDX Racing	(United States) Moisey Uretsky	(United States) Mark Kvamme
5	(Canada) Circuit Gilles Villeneuve, Montreal, Quebec	June 7–9	(Netherlands) Loek Hartog	(United States) Yves Baltas	(United States) Yves Baltas	(United States) MDK Motorsports	(United States) James Sofronas	(United States) Matt Halcome
6	(Canada) Circuit Gilles Villeneuve, Montreal, Quebec	June 7–9	(Netherlands) Loek Hartog	(United States) Michael Cooper	(Netherlands) Loek Hartog	(United States) Kellymoss	(United States) Moisey Uretsky	(United States) Matt Halcome
7	(United States) Watkins Glen International, Watkins Glen, New York	June 20–22	(New Zealand) Ryan Yardley	(New Zealand) Ryan Yardley	(New Zealand) Ryan Yardley	(United States) Topp Racing Performance	(United States) Alan Metni	(United States) Richard Edge
8	(United States) Watkins Glen International, Watkins Glen, New York	June 20–22	(United Kingdom) Alex Sedgwick	(Dominican Republic) Jimmy Llibre	(United Kingdom) Alex Sedgwick	(United States) JDX Racing	(Switzerland) Pedro Torres	(United States) Richard Edge
9	(United States) Road America, Elkhart Lake, Wisconsin	August 2–4	(Netherlands) Loek Hartog	(Netherlands) Loek Hartog	(Netherlands) Loek Hartog	(United States) Kellymoss	(Switzerland) Pedro Torres	(United States) Chris Bellomo
10	(United States) Road America, Elkhart Lake, Wisconsin	August 2–4	(Netherlands) Loek Hartog	(Netherlands) Loek Hartog	(Netherlands) Loek Hartog	(United States) Kellymoss	(United States) James Sofronas	(United States) Chris Bellomo
11	(United States) Indianapolis Motor Speedway, Speedway, Indiana	September 20–22	(Netherlands) Loek Hartog	(Netherlands) Loek Hartog	(Netherlands) Loek Hartog	(United States) Kellymoss	(United States) Alan Metni	(United States) Scott Blind
12	(United States) Indianapolis Motor Speedway, Speedway, Indiana	September 20–22	(Netherlands) Loek Hartog	(Netherlands) Loek Hartog	(Netherlands) Loek Hartog	(United States) Kellymoss	(United States) Alan Metni	(United States) Richard Edge
13	(United States) Road Atlanta, Braselton, Georgia	October 9–11	(United Kingdom) Alex Sedgwick	(Canada) Zachary Vanier	(Canada) Zachary Vanier	(United States) JDX Racing	(Dominican Republic) Efrin Castro	(United States) Richard Edge
14	(United States) Road Atlanta, Braselton, Georgia	October 9–11	(New Zealand) Ryan Yardley	(Netherlands) Loek Hartog	(New Zealand) Ryan Yardley	(United States) Topp Racing Performance	(Dominican Republic) Efrin Castro	(United States) Chris Bellomo
15	(United States) Circuit of the Americas, Austin, Texas	October 18–20	(Netherlands) Loek Hartog	(Canada) Zachary Vanier	(Canada) Zachary Vanier	(United States) JDX Racing	(Dominican Republic) Efrin Castro	(United States) Chris Bellomo
16	(United States) Circuit of the Americas, Austin, Texas	October 18–20	(United States) Michael Cooper	(New Zealand) Ryan Yardley	(New Zealand) Ryan Yardley	(United States) Topp Racing Performance	(United States) Alan Metni	(United States) Scott Blind

== Championship standings ==
=== Points system ===
Championship points are awarded in each class at the finish of each event. Points are awarded based on finishing positions in the race as shown in the chart below.

Position	**1st**	**2nd**	**3rd**	**4th**	**5th**	**6th**	**7th**	**8th**	**9th**	**10th**	**11th**	**12th**	**13th**	**14th**	**15th**	Pole	FL
Points	25	20	17	14	12	10	9	8	7	6	5	4	3	2	1	2	1

For the Pro-Am and Masters championships, the lowest two race results before the final round are dropped. All pole position and fastest lap points are retained.

=== Driver's Championship ===
Pos.	Driver	SEB (United States)		MIA (United States)		CGV (Canada)		WGL (United States)		ROA (United States)		IMS (United States)		ATL (United States)		COT (United States)		Points
Overall
1	(Netherlands) Loek Hartog	**1**	3	1	7	**2**	**1**	2	2	**1**	**1**	**1**	**1**	2	2	**2**	4	342
2	(New Zealand) Ryan Yardley	3	2	35	3	9	26	**1**	3	4	4	2	5	3	**1**	3	1	254
3	(Canada) Zachary Vanier	7	12	2	1	7	5	5	4	14	2	5	18	1	3	1	3	233
4	(United Kingdom) Alex Sedgwick	4	5	**15**	**2**	4	4	6	**1**	2	6	3	2	**4**	4	5	2	228
5	(United Kingdom) Dan Clarke	8	9	4	29	5	30	3	5	6	3	6	3	5	7	10	6	167
6	(United States) Michael Cooper	6	6	3	5	3	3	4	7	30	10	4	10	8	DNS	4	**5**	160
7	(United States) Yves Baltas	9	10	7	8	1	2	9	11	11	12	27	17	6	5	7	9	133
8	(Dominican Republic) Jimmy Llibre	10	8	34	9	10	10	20	6	3	5	26	4	7	6	6	8	126
9	(United States) Elias De La Torre	11	11	5	6	11	9	12	8	5	9	12	6	10	9	8	13	116
10	(United States) Michael McCann	13	4	6	27	6	7	10	12	8	7	8	7	13	15	11	7	112
11	(United States) Colin Kaminsky	5	7	9	13	12	29	7	9	18	8	7	13	9	8	9	10	103
12	(United States) Sabré Cook	14	13	8	10	25	8	8	10	9	32	9	8	28	DNS	20	11	71
13	(United Kingdom) Gustav Burton	2	**1**	18	4	WD	WD											62
14	(United States) Jake Pedersen	33	14	10	12	18	11	11	28	28	21	10	9	24	14	19	12	44
15	(New Zealand) Madeline Stewart	17	40	16	36	17	13	16	29	7	11	15	11	27	10	14	15	32
16	(Venezuela) Ángel Benítez	12	24	21	11	8	6	33	34			DNS	27	16	17	18	31	28
17	(Dominican Republic) Efrin Castro	35	35	11	16	30	19	14	31	20	16	13	19	11	11	12	17	24
18	(United States) Alan Metni	40	15	19	35	19	16	13	27	29	27	11	12	12	12	17	14	23
19	(United States) Moisey Uretsky	32	22	14	14	14	12	17	32	25	15	14	16	15	18	23	16	14
20	(Canada) Marco Cirone	16	16	17	17	16	14	18	14	12	17	22	15	14	13	16	32	14
21	(Switzerland) Pedro Torres	18	19					15	13	10	14	21	26	17	16			12
22	(United States) James Sofronas	15	28	23	32	13	27			15	13					15	18	9
23	(United States) Jordan Wallace	25	20	12	33	15	20	28	18	27	25	16	14			25	26	7
24	(United States) Jeff Mosing	19	38	22	18	24	18	30	26	13	20	23	23	19	24	21	25	3
25	(Netherlands) Michael Verhagen			13	34													3
26	(Germany) Thomas Kiefer															13	19	3
27	(San Marino) Kenton King	36	17	20	15	23	25	34	15	31	28							2
28	(United States) Matt Halcome	20	21	32	23	20	15	23	19	19	19	24	21	20	23	36	22	1
29	(United States) Richard Edge	22	36					22	16	17	22	20	20	18	20			0
30	(United States) Chris Bellomo	21	31	25	25	21	32	27	30	16	18	18	28	22	19	22	21	0
31	(Canada) Roberto Tutino	28	39	28	21	31	17	19	33	DNS	DNS							0
32	(United States) Mark Kvamme	29	37	24	19	27	24	25	17									0
33	(United States) Scott Blind	30	26	33	20			29	25	22	23	17	22	21	21	26	20	0
34	(Germany) Peter Ludwig	23	18	29	28	28	21	21	21									0
35	(United States) John Goetz	24	27	36	22	32	28	26	22	21	24	19	24	23	22	30	33	0
36	(United States) Jody Miller							24	20	24	31			25	25	27	24	0
37	(Canada) Kyle Washington	26	25	WD	WD	22	22			23	29					24	27	0
38	(United States) Carlos de Quesada	38	23	31	31	26	23	31	23	DNS	DNS							0
39	(United States) Joel Johnson															35	23	0
40	(United States) Tom Balames	37	34	30	26			32	24	32	30					31	30	0
41	(United States) Ofir Levy			27	24	WD	WD											0
42	(Venezuela) Javier Ripoll Sanchez	39	30					WD	WD			25	25	26	26	28	28	0
43	(United States) Todd Parriott	34	32							26	26	28	29			32	29	0
44	(United States) Thomas Collingwood	27	29	26	30													0
45	(Portugal) Andre Renha Fernandes					29	31											0
46	(United States) Josh Conley															29	34	0
47	(United States) Naveen Rao	31	33															0
48	(United States) Peter Atwater															33	EX	0
49	(United States) John Gilliland															34	35	0
–	(United States) David Tuaty			DNS	DNS													–
–	(Kyrgyzstan) Stanislav Minskiy											DNS	DNS					–
Pro-Am
1	(Canada) Marco Cirone	16	16	17	17	16	14	**18**	14									136
2	(United States) Moisey Uretsky	32	22	14	14	14	12	17	32									123
3	(United States) Alan Metni	**40**	**15**	19	35	19	16	13	27									111
4	(Dominican Republic) Efrin Castro	35	35	**11**	**16**	30	19	14	**31**									106
5	(United States) Jordan Wallace	25	20	12	33	**15**	**20**	28	18									102
6	(San Marino) Kenton King	36	17	20	15	23	25	34	15									91
7	(United States) Jeff Mosing	19	38	22	18	24	18	30	26									79
8	(United States) James Sofronas	15	28	23	32	13	27											77
9	(Germany) Peter Ludwig	23	18	29	28	28	21	21	21									76
10	(Switzerland) Pedro Torres	18	19					15	13									73
11	(Canada) Roberto Tutino	28	39	28	21	31	17	19	33									55
12	(United States) Thomas Collingwood	27	29	26	30													27
13	(United States) Ofir Levy			27	24													15
14	(United States) Naveen Rao	31	33															12
15	(Portugal) Andre Renha Fernandes					29	31											12
16	(Venezuela) Javier Ripoll Sanchez	39	30															9
Masters
1	(United States) Matt Halcome	20	21	32	23	**20**	**15**	23	19									175
2	(United States) Mark Kvamme	29	37	24	19	27	24	25	17									132
3	(United States) Chris Bellomo	**21**	**31**	**25**	**25**	21	32	27	30									117
4	(United States) Carlos de Quesada	38	23	31	31	26	23	31	23									96
5	(United States) John Goetz	24	27	36	22	32	28	26	22									93
6	(United States) Richard Edge	22	36					22	**16**									77
7	(United States) Scott Blind	30	26	33	20			**29**	25									76
8	(United States) Kyle Washington	26	25	WD	WD	22	22											60
9	(United States) Tom Balames	37	34	30	26			32	24									51
10	(United States) Jody Miller							24	20									31
11	(United States) Todd Parriott	34	32															17
12	(United States) David Tuaty			37	37													0
Pos.	Driver	SEB (United States)		MIA (United States)		CGV (Canada)		WGL (United States)		ROA (United States)		IMS (United States)		ATL (United States)		COT (United States)		Points

Colour	Result
Gold	Winner
Silver	Second place
Bronze	Third place
Green	Points classification
Blue	Non-points classification
Blue	Non-classified finish (NC)
Purple	Retired, not classified (Ret)
Red	Did not qualify (DNQ)
Red	Did not pre-qualify (DNPQ)
Black	Disqualified (DSQ)
White	Did not start (DNS)
White	Withdrew (WD)
White	Race cancelled (C)
Blank	Did not practice (DNP)
Blank	Did not arrive (DNA)
Blank	Excluded (EX)

- **Bold** - Pole position
- Italics - Fastest lap
