= Loek Hartog =

Dutch racing driver (born 2002)

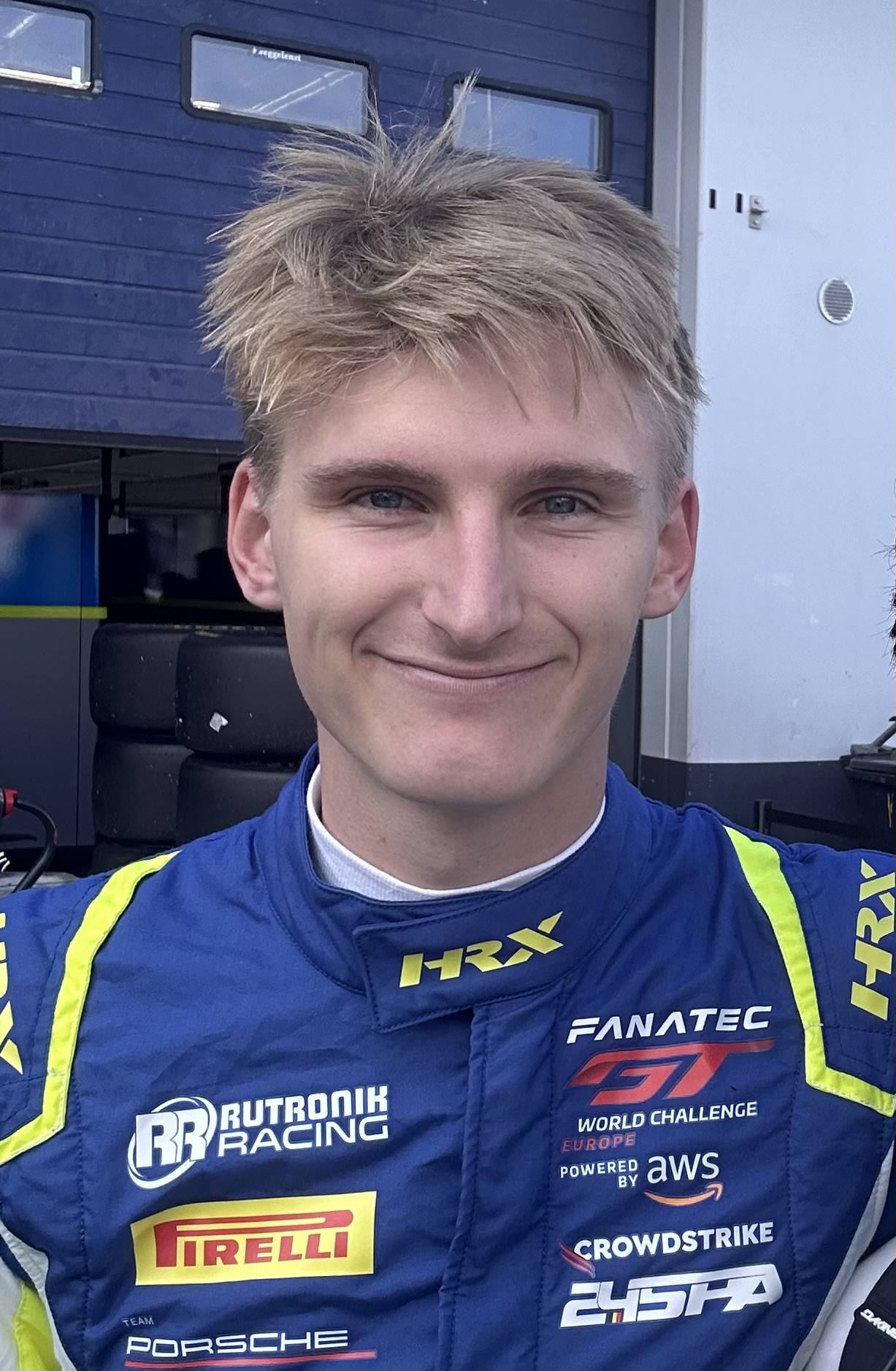
- Hartog at the Nürburgring in 2024
- Nationality: Netherlands
- Born: 5 October 2002 (age 24) Hoogmade, Netherlands

Porsche Supercup career
- Debut season: 2019
- Current team: Team GP Elite
- Categorisation: FIA Silver (until 2025); FIA Gold (2026–)
- Car number: 24
- Former teams: MRS GT-Racing, Bas Koeten Racing Team, Team Parker Racing, Ombra Racing
- Starts: 21 (21 entries)
- Wins: 1
- Podiums: 2
- Poles: 1
- Fastest laps: 2
- Best finish: 6th in 2023

Awards
- 2025: Porsche Cup

Loek Hartog (born 5 October 2002) is a Dutch racing driver competing in the GT World Challenge Europe Endurance Cup for Rutronik Racing. He is the 2025 Porsche Cup award winner.

== Career ==
=== Porsche competition ===
After making a brief cameo in karting, in the BNL Golden Trophy, Hartog began his full time racing debut in the 2019 Porsche Carrera Cup Benelux, where he finished in third, picking up two wins, four pole positions and eight podiums, with Bas Koeten Racing. He also made an appearance in the 2019 Porsche Carrera Cup France with the team and then drove for MRS GT-Racing in the 2019 Porsche Supercup for the seventh round in Spa-Francorchamps, where he finished in 18th.

In 2020, Hartog made cameos in the 2020 Porsche Supercup and the Porsche Carrera Cup Germany for Bas Koeten Racing Team. He came tenth in his appearance at Spa-Francorchamps in the 2020 Porsche Supercup, but as he was guest driver, he was ineligible to score points. He also won the Porsche Carrera Cup Benelux that year as well.

Hartog's career perked up in 2021, where he got a full time drive in the 2021 Porsche Carrera Cup Germany for Black Falcon Team TEXTAR. Hartog was one of the standout rookies of the series, as he fought with Bastian Buus for the rookie title, with Hartog pipping him to the title. He also got his first podium in the series at his home race at Circuit Zandvoort.

Hartog also drove in the 2021 Porsche Supercup for three races with Team Parker Racing, coming in points paying positions in Spa-Francorchamps and his home race of Circuit Zandvoort, he was ineligible for points due to being a guest driver. In 2022, Hartog drove in the Porsche Supercup full time with Ombra Racing, scoring points in all races bar the exception of Circuit Paul Ricard, where he retired from the race. He finished eighth in the overall classifications with 43 points and came runner-up to the rookies title.

Hartog also contested the 2022 Porsche Carrera Cup Germany full time, driving for Black Falcon, where he got his maiden pole position in the Red Bull Ring, followed by a second pole a round later in Imola Circuit. He finished the season in fifth with four podiums and 185 points.

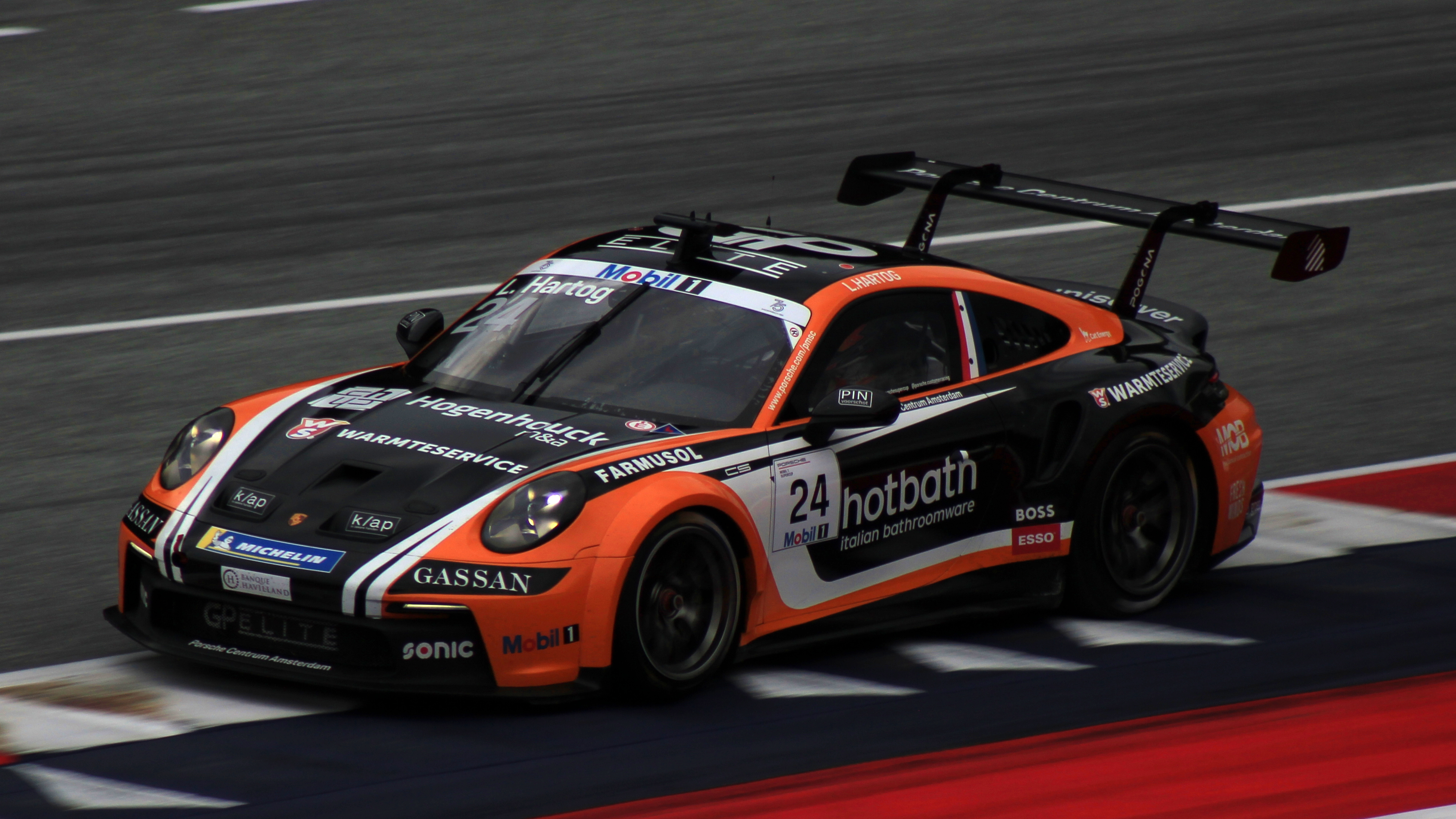
Hartog during the Supercup Austrian round in 2023.

In 2023, Hartog drove for Dutch team Team GP Elite in the 2023 Porsche Supercup and the 2023 Porsche Carrera Cup Germany. At Zandvoort he would get his first podium in the Porsche Supercup, with a second place, and in the following race, also staged at Zandvoort, he got his maiden pole in the series, which was followed by a maiden win. He finished the championship in sixth place with 75 points.

Meanwhile, in the 2023 Porsche Carrera Cup Germany, Hartog had a rather successful campaign where he fought for the championship title with teammate, two-time Porsche Supercup champion, Larry ten Voorde. He started his title bid in the first race of the first round at Spa-Francorchamps, where he got a podium and a maiden win in the second race. Hartog got two pole positions at the second round at the Hockenheimring, coming second and first in the races. Despite getting no podiums in the next rounds, he was consistent with points until he repeated a similar exploit to the one he did at the Hockenheimring, in the fifth round at the Lausitzring, where he claimed two poles and won the first race, but would retire from the second one.

In the final few rounds, Hartog would claim two more poles and three more podiums, including a win. He finished the championship in the runner-up position, behind Larry ten Voorde.

In 2024, Hartog joined Kellymoss to make his debut in the Porsche Carrera Cup North America and dominated the championship, throughout the sixteen races, he won seven of them, getting eight pole positions and bagging a podium in all races but two, as he ended the championship with 339 points, which was more than 100 points ahead of his main rival, New Zealander Ryan Yardley.

Hartog also made a cameo in the fifth round of the 2024 Porsche Supercup at the Hungaroring with Dinamic Motorsport, where he came ninth in the race, but as he was a guest driver, he was ineligible to score points.

Hartog also competed in the inaugural edition of the 2024 992 Endurance Cup, a 12-hour endurance race at the Circuit de Spa-Francorchamps with German team BLACK FALCON Team 48 LOSCH and German drivers, Christopher Mies, Tobias Müller and Noah Nagelsdiek. The quartet would win the race in twelve hours, one minute and fifteen seconds after qualifying in fifth position.

=== GT3 career ===
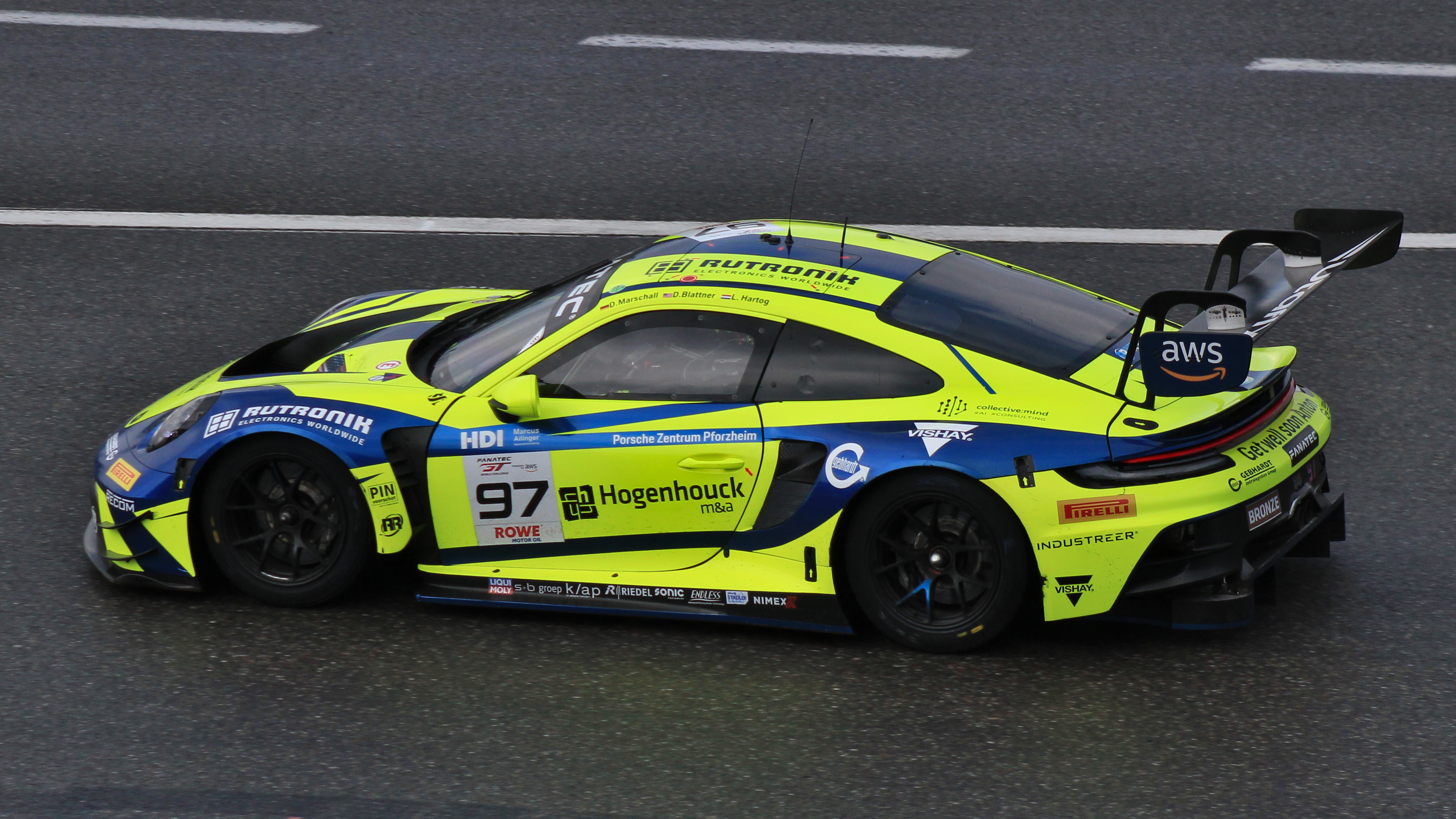
Hartog's No. 97 car during the Nürburgring round of the 2024 GT World Challenge Europe Endurance Cup. They converted their maiden pole position into a victory.

In early 2024, Hartog made his GT3 debut with Dennis Marschall and Dustin Blattner for Car Collection Motorsport in the second round of the Middle East Trophy at the 6 Hours of Abu Dhabi, where they would win the race. The young Dutchman would continue with GT's and would drive a Porsche 911 GT3 R (992) for Rutronik Racing with Marschall and Blattner in the Bronze Cup of the 2024 GT World Challenge Europe Endurance Cup. After a rough start in the first race of the season, and retiring from the 2024 24 Hours of Spa, they got a maiden a pole position and converted that to a win in the third round at Nürburgring. Hartog wouldn't participate in the fourth round due to a clash with his Porsche Carrera Cup North America duties, but did the fifth and final round at the Jeddah Corniche Circuit, where his team followed the same pattern they did at the Nürburgring. He came fifth in the Bronze category of the drivers' championship with 33 points.

To round off his 2024 season, Hartog partnered up with drivers Patric Niederhauser and Antares Au to compete in the 2024 Indianapolis 8 Hours in the Pro-Am class with Herberth Motorsport. Niederhauser got the event's overall pole position, and the trio finished the race in seventh place in their category with a fastest lap as well. They were ineligible for points as they entered the race as guest drivers.

In 2025, Hartog continued in the GT World Challenge Europe Endurance Cup with Rutronik Racing, partnering Morris Schuring and Au. He won the Bronze Cup class at Monza and Barcelona to finish runner-up. Hartog's season included entry into all three major 24-hour races which took place consecutively in June: the 24 Hours of Le Mans for Manthey Racing, the 24 Hours of Nürburgring for Dinamic GT (where he finished 3rd overall), and the 24 Hours of Spa for Rutronik.

In late 2025, Hartog won the Porsche Cup, an annual award presented by Porsche AG to recognise the world's most successful privateer racing driver competing with Porsche machinery in a customer racing team.

On 5 September 2026, Hartog rescued fellow driver Ollie Millroy from a burning car following an accident at the Shanghai round of the 2026 China GT Championship. Millroy was hit by two cars at the turn 14 hairpin, causing his Ferrari to burst into flames. Hartog, who was several positions back, stopped to assist Millroy, using a fire extinguisher handed to him by a marshal before pulling Millroy out of the car. Millroy was later taken to hospital with several fractures, where he thanked Hartog for "his incredible act of bravery", stating "I owe my life to him". Hartog said on a social media post that there was "never a moment of doubt" about helping Millroy.

== Personal life ==
Hartog is one of the tallest drivers in racing, at 1.98 m (6 ft 6 in).

== Karting record ==
=== Karting career summary ===
Season	Series	Team	Position
2017	BNL Golden Trophy — Senior Max		19th

== Racing record ==
=== Racing career summary ===
Season	Series	Team	Races	Wins	Poles	F/Laps	Podiums	Points	Position
2019	24H TCE Continents Series - TCR	Bas Koeten Racing	1	0	0	0	1	0	NC
2019	Porsche Carrera Cup Benelux	Bas Koeten Racing	12	2	4	3	8	184	**3rd**
2019	Porsche Carrera Cup France	Bas Koeten Racing	1	0	0	0	0	0	NC
2019	Porsche Supercup	MRS GT-Racing	1	0	0	0	0	0	31st
2020	Porsche Supercup	Bas Koeten Racing Team	1	0	0	0	0	0	NC†
2020	Porsche Carrera Cup Germany	Bas Koeten Racing Team	1	0	0	0	0	0	NC
2020	Porsche Carrera Cup Benelux	Bas Koeten Racing Team	?	?	?	?	?	?	**1st**
2021	Porsche Carrera Cup Germany	Black Falcon Team TEXTAR	16	0	0	1	1	107	10th
2021	Porsche Supercup	Team Parker Racing	3	0	0	0	0	0	NC†
2021	Nürburgring Endurance Series - VT2	Adrenalin Motorsport Team Alzner Automotive	1	0	0	0	0	?	?
2021	Nürburgring Endurance Series - V5	Adrenalin Motorsport Team Alzner Automotive	1	0	0	0	1	?	?
2022	Porsche Supercup	Ombra Racing	8	0	0	0	0	43	8th
2022	Porsche Carrera Cup Germany	Black Falcon	16	0	2	0	4	185	5th
2023	Porsche Carrera Cup Germany	Team GP Elite	16	4	6	3	8	251	**2nd**
2023	Porsche Supercup	Team GP Elite	8	1	1	2	2	75	6th
2023-24	Middle East Trophy - GT3	Car Collection Motorsport	1	1	1	0	1	0	NC†
2024	GT World Challenge Europe Endurance Cup	Rutronik Racing	4	0	0	0	0	0	NC
2024	GT World Challenge Europe Endurance Cup - Bronze	Rutronik Racing	4	2	2	0	2	33	5th
2024	Porsche Carrera Cup North America	Kellymoss	16	7	8	8	14	339	**1st**
2024	Porsche Supercup	Dinamic Motorsport SRL	1	0	0	0	0	0	NC†
2024	992 Endurance Cup	Black Falcon Team 48 LOSCH	1	1	0	0	1	N/A	**1st**
2024	GT World Challenge America - Pro-Am	Herberth Motorsport	1	0	1	1	0	0	NC†
2025	Middle East Trophy - GT3	Dinamic GT	1	0	0	0	1	46	**1st**
2025	Middle East Trophy - GT3	Herberth Motorsport	1	0	0	0	0	46	**1st**
2025	GT World Challenge Europe Endurance Cup	Rutronik Racing	5	0	0	0	0	1	28th
2025	GT World Challenge Europe Endurance Cup - Bronze	Rutronik Racing	5	2	0	0	2	66	**2nd**
2025	GT World Challenge Europe Sprint Cup	Rutronik Racing	10	0	0	0	0	0	NC
2025	GT World Challenge Europe Sprint Cup - Silver	Rutronik Racing	10	0	0	1	0	42	9th
2025	Intercontinental GT Challenge	Dinamic GT	1	0	0	0	1	32	11th
2025	Intercontinental GT Challenge	Rutronik Racing	1	0	0	0	0	32	11th
2025	Intercontinental GT Challenge	Absolute Racing	1	0	0	0	1	32	11th
2025	Intercontinental GT Challenge	Wright Motorsports	1	0	0	0	0	32	11th
2025	24 Hours of Le Mans - LMGT3	Manthey Racing	1	0	0	0	0	N/A	6th
2025	GT4 America Series - Pro-Am	ACI Motorsports	7	0	0	0	0	40	11th
2025	24H Series - GT3	Ziggo Sport – Tempesta Racing	1	1	0	1	1	0	NC†
2025	24H Series - GT3	Red Ant Racing	1	0	0	0	0	0	NC†
2025	Nürburgring Langstrecken-Serie - SP9	Dinamic GT	3	0	0	0	0	*	*
2025	24 Hours of Nürbugring - SP9	Dinamic GT	1	0	0	0	1	N/A	**3rd**
2025-26	Asian Le Mans Series - GT	Manthey Racing	6	0	0	1	4	70	**3rd**
2025-26	24H Series Middle East - GT3	Absolute Racing	1	0	0	0	1	76	**2nd**
2025-26	24H Series Middle East - GT3	Herberth Motorsport	2	1	0	0	1	76	**2nd**
2026	Nürburgring Langstrecken-Serie - SP9	Dinamic GT							
2026	24 Hours of Nürbugring - SP9	Dinamic GT	1	0	0	0	0	N/A	5th
2026	GT World Challenge America - Pro-Am	Kellymoss	6	0	0	0	0	11	16th
2026	China GT Championship - GT3	Phantom Global Racing							
2026	GT World Challenge Asia	Phantom Global Racing	4	1	1	0	1	65	13th
2026	GT World Challenge Asia	Origine Motorsport	2	0	0	0	1	65	13th
2026	GT World Challenge Europe Endurance Cup	Rutronik Racing	1	0	0	0	0	0	NC
2026	IMSA SportsCar Championship - GTD Pro	Manthey Racing	1	0	0	0	0	210	43rd

^{†} As he was a guest driver, Hartog was ineligible to score points.

^{*} Season still in progress.

=== Complete Porsche Supercup results ===
(key) (Races in bold indicate pole position) (Races in italics indicate fastest lap)

Year	Team	1	2	3	4	5	6	7	8	9	10	Pos.	Points
2019	MRS GT-Racing	CAT	MON	RBR	SIL	HOC	HUN	SPA; 18	MNZ	MEX	MEX	31st	0
2020	Bas Koeten Racing Team	RBR	RBR	HUN	SIL	SIL	CAT	SPA; 10	MNZ			NC†	0
2021	Team Parker Racing	MON	RBR	RBR	HUN; 23	SPA; 10	ZND; 11	MNZ	MNZ			NC†	0
2022	Ombra Racing	IMO; 9	MON; 15	SIL; 10	RBR; 13	LEC; Ret	SPA; 9	ZND; 6	MNZ; 8			8th	43
2023	Team GP Elite	MON; 4	RBR; Ret	SIL; 10	HUN; 16	SPA; 10	ZND; 2	**ZND**; 1	MNZ; Ret			6th	75
2024	Dinamic Motorsport SRL	IMO	MON	RBR	SIL	HUN; 9	SPA	ZAN	MNZ			NC†	0

^{†} As Hartog was a guest driver, he was ineligible to score points.

=== Complete Porsche Carrera Cup Germany results ===
(key) (Races in bold indicate pole position) (Races in italics indicate fastest lap)

Year	Team	1	2	3	4	5	6	7	8	9	10	11	12	13	14	15	16	DC	Points
2020	Bas Koeten Racing Team	LMS; 16	SAC; 1	SAC; 2	SAC; 3	RBR; 1	RBR; 2	RBR; 3	LAU; 1	LAU; 2	OSC; 1	OSC; 2						NC†	0
2021	Black Falcon Team TEXTAR	SPA; 1; 7	SPA; 2; 9	OSC; 1; 18	OSC; 2; 25	RBR; 1; 15	RBR; 2; 10	MNZ1; 1; 5	MNZ1; 2; 10	ZAN; 1; 8	ZAN; 2; 2	MNZ2; 1; 6	MNZ2; 2; 13	SAC; 1; 11	SAC; 2; 13	HOC; 1; 9	HOC; 2; 10	10th	107
2022	Black Falcon	SPA; 1; 4	SPA; 2; 6	**RBR**; **1**; 3	RBR; 2; 6	**IMO**; **1**; 4	IMO; 2; 2	ZAN; 1; 6	ZAN; 2; 14	NÜR; 1; 4	NÜR; 2; 3	LAU; 1; 3	LAU; 2; 5	SAC; 1; 4	SAC; 2; 5	HOC; 1; 5	HOC; 2 Ret	5th	185
2023	Team GP Elite	SPA; 1; 3	SPA; 2; 1	**HOC**; **1**; 2	**HOC**; **2**; 1	ZAN; 1; 5	ZAN; 2; 11	NÜR; 1; 4	NÜR; 2; 7	**LAU**; **1**; 1	**LAU**; **2** Ret	SAC; 1; 4	SAC; 2; 4	**RBR**; **1**; 5	**RBR**; **2**; 2	HOC; 1; 1	HOC; 2; 2	2nd	251

^{†}As Hartog was a guest driver, he was ineligible to score points.

=== Complete GT World Challenge Europe results ===
==== GT World Challenge Europe Endurance Cup ====
Year	Team	Car	Class	1	2	3	4	5	6	7	Pos.	Points
2024	Rutronik Racing	Porsche 911 GT3 R (992)	Bronze	LEC; 31	SPA; 6H; Ret	SPA; 12H; Ret	SPA; 24H; Ret	**NÜR**; 22	MNZ	**JED**; 17	5th	33
2025	Rutronik Racing	Porsche 911 GT3 R (992)	Bronze	LEC; 39	MNZ; 10	SPA; 6H; 66	SPA; 12H; 57	SPA; 24H; 45	NÜR; 35	CAT; 12	2nd	66
2026	Rutronik Racing	Porsche 911 GT3 R (992.2)	Bronze	LEC; 13	MNZ	SPA; 6H	SPA; 12H	SPA; 24H	NÜR	ALG	10th	33

==== GT World Challenge Europe Sprint Cup ====
Year	Team	Car	Class	1	2	3	4	5	6	7	8	9	10	Pos.	Points
2025	Rutronik Racing	Porsche 911 GT3 R (992)	Silver	BRH; 1; 15	BRH; 2 Ret	ZAN; 1; 16	ZAN; 2; 28	MIS; 1; 23	MIS; 2; 41	MAG; 1; 20	MAG; 2; 20	VAL; 1; 26	VAL; 2; 11	9th	42

=== 24 Hours of Le Mans results ===
Year	Team	Co-Drivers	Car	Class	Laps	Pos.	Class Pos.
2025	(Germany) Manthey	(Hong Kong) Antares Au (Austria) Klaus Bachler	Porsche 911 GT3 R (992)	LMGT3	340	38th	6th

=== Complete Asian Le Mans Series results ===
(key) (Races in bold indicate pole position) (Races in italics indicate fastest lap)

Year	Team	Class	Car	Engine	1	2	3	4	5	6	Pos.	Points
2025–26	Manthey Racing	GT	Porsche 911 GT3 R (992)	Porsche M97/80 4.2 L Flat-6	SEP; 1; 2	SEP; 2 Ret	DUB; 1; 2	DUB; 2; 3	ABU; 1; 9	ABU; 2; 3	3rd	70

=== Complete IMSA SportsCar Championship results ===
(key) (Races in bold indicate pole position; results in italics indicate fastest lap)

Year	Team	Class	Make	Engine	1	2	3	4	5	6	7	8	9	10	Pos.	Points
2026	Manthey Racing	GTD Pro	Porsche 911 GT3 R (992.2)	Porsche M97/80 4.2 L Flat-6	DAY	SEB	LGA	DET	WGL; 12	MOS	ELK	VIR	IMS	PET	43rd	210
