= 2003 Formula Volkswagen Germany season =

Seasons
- ← 2002 none →

The 2003 Formula Volkswagen Germany supported by ZF Sachs was the inaugural season of the Formula Volkswagen Germany. All drivers competed in Volkswagen powered, Dunlop shod Reynard chassis.

== Calendar and results ==
Round	Circuit	Location	Date	Pole position	Fastest lap	Winning driver
1	(Germany) Motorsport Arena Oschersleben	Oschersleben, Germany	May 3	(Netherlands) Jaap van Lagen	(Netherlands) Jaap van Lagen	(Netherlands) Jaap van Lagen
2	(Germany) Motorsport Arena Oschersleben	Oschersleben, Germany	May 4	(Netherlands) Jaap van Lagen	(Austria) Hannes Lachinger	(Netherlands) Jaap van Lagen
3	(Germany) Hockenheimring	Hockenheim, Germany	June 14	(Austria) Hannes Lachinger	(Austria) Hannes Lachinger	(Austria) Hannes Lachinger
4	(Germany) Hockenheimring	Hockenheim, Germany	June 15	(Austria) Hannes Lachinger	(Germany) Bastian Kolmsee	(Netherlands) Jaap van Lagen
5	(Germany) Nürburgring	Nürburg, Germany	July 12	(Austria) Hannes Lachinger	(Germany) Jochen Nerpel	(Netherlands) Jaap van Lagen
6	(Germany) Nürburgring	Nürburg, Germany	July 13	(Germany) Marvin Bylitza	(Netherlands) Jaap van Lagen	(Netherlands) Jaap van Lagen
7	(Austria) Salzburgring	Salzburg, Austria	August 9	(Netherlands) Jaap van Lagen	(Germany) Marcus Steinel	(Germany) Bastian Kolmsee
8	(Austria) Salzburgring	Salzburg, Austria	August 10	(Netherlands) Jaap van Lagen	(Netherlands) Jaap van Lagen	(Netherlands) Jaap van Lagen
9	(Germany) Lausitzring	Lausitz, Germany	September 27	(Netherlands) Jaap van Lagen	(Netherlands) Jaap van Lagen	(Austria) Hannes Lachinger
10	(Germany) Lausitzring	Lausitz, Germany	September 28	(Netherlands) Jaap van Lagen	(Austria) Hannes Lachinger	(Austria) Hannes Lachinger
11	(Germany) Motorsport Arena Oschersleben	Oschersleben, Germany	October 11	(Germany) Bastian Kolmsee	(Netherlands) Jaap van Lagen	(Germany) Bastian Kolmsee
12	(Germany) Motorsport Arena Oschersleben	Oschersleben, Germany	October 12	(Luxembourg) Jeff Raach	(Germany) Marvin Bylitza	(Luxembourg) Jeff Raach

== Final standings ==
Color	Result
Gold	Winner
Silver	2nd place
Bronze	3rd place
Green	4th & 5th place
Light Blue	6th–10th place
Dark Blue	11th place or lower
Purple	Did not finish
Red	Did not qualify (DNQ)
Brown	Withdrawn (Wth)
Black	Disqualified (DSQ)
White	Did not start (DNS)
Blank	Did not participate (DNP)
Blank	Driver replacement (Rpl)
Blank	Injured (Inj)
Blank	No race held (NH)

Rank	Driver	(Germany) OSC		(Germany) HOC		(Germany) NUR		(Austria) SAL		(Germany) LAU		(Germany) OSC		Points
1	(Netherlands) Jaap van Lagen	1	1	2	1	1	1	3	1	9	DNS	2	5	336
2	(Austria) Hannes Lachinger	3	2	1			3	4	4	1	1	4	4	277
3	(Germany) Bastian Kolmsee	4	3	4	8		5	1	2	4		1	2	208
4	(Germany) Marcel Leipert		7	7	3	4	8			8	7	5	8	177
5	(Germany) Florian Stoll	8	9	6	3	3	6		5		5	8	9	176
6	(Germany) Jochen Nerpel	5	4	6	2	2	10	2	Ret		6	9	7	174
7	(Germany) Marcus Steinel	6		3	4		4	6	3	2	3	6	6	171
8	(Germany) Stephanie Halm				9	8		10	8	7	8	7	10	169
9	(Germany) Marvin Bylitza	10	10	5		5		7	6	5	Ret		3	156
10	(Switzerland) Fredy Barth	7	6	8	7		2	8	7		10	Ret		149
11	(Germany) Jan Seyffarth			9		9		5	10	6	2		Ret	136
12	(Germany) Gina-Maria Adenauer							9	9	10	9			132
13														
14														
15	(Germany) Ronny Wechselberger	9	8		5	6	9			3				105
16	(Germany) Julian Kuhn	12			10		Ret							86
17	(Germany) Fabian Brameier													83
18	(Luxembourg) Jeff Raach											3	1	69
19	(China) Teng Yi Jiang													62
	(Germany) Fabian Brameier										4			
	(China) Shao Quan Chen	11				10			14			10		
	(Finland) Aki Rask											Ret	Ret	
	(Italy) Giorgio Sanna													
	(South Africa) Tschops Sipuka													
	(Germany) Stefan Tiesmeyer	2	5	10	2	7	7							
