= Armenian Automobile Federation =

Motorsport governing body in Armenia

- Հայաստանի ավտոմոբիլային ֆեդերացիա
- Abbreviation: FAA
- Predecessor: Soviet Armenian Automobile Federation
- Formation: 1993
- Type: National automobile federation
- Headquarters: 29/3 Margaryan Street
- Location: Yerevan, Armenia
- Region served: Armenia
- President: Aram Sargsyan
- Affiliations: Fédération Internationale de l'Automobile; FIA Karting
- Website: faa.am

The Armenian Automobile Federation (FAA; Armenian: Հայաստանի ավտոմոբիլային ֆեդերացիա; French: Fédération Automobile Arménienne), also known as the Automobile Federation of Armenia, is the national automobile federation of Armenia. It is involved in motorsport, karting, road safety, mobility and automobile tourism activities in Armenia. The federation is headquartered in Yerevan and is a member club of the Fédération Internationale de l'Automobile (FIA), where it is listed as the FIA Sport & Mobility member club for Armenia.

== History ==
The federation traces its heritage to the Soviet Armenian Automobile Federation, founded in 1957. Following Armenia's independence, the federation was restructured in 1993 as the modern Armenian Automobile Federation. In 1996, it was accepted as a full member of the Fédération Internationale de l'Automobile (FIA). Since 2006, the federation has also been part of the FIA Road Safety National Council.

Following a period in which the federation's FIA participation was limited to associate-level status, FAA undertook a renewed institutional development process between 2023 and 2025, including expanded sport, mobility, road safety and international cooperation activities. By December 2025, during the FIA Annual General Assemblies week in Tashkent, Uzbekistan, the federation's full FIA membership status had been consolidated.

The renewed status followed a period of increased engagement with FIA sport and mobility programmes, including Armenia's participation in road safety projects, the Carnet de Passages en Douane network, FIA Immersion Programme activities and the FIA Affordable Cross Car project.

The federation is also listed by FIA Karting as the Armenian member organization for karting activities.

In May 2026, following an Extraordinary Congress of the Automobile Federation of Armenia, Aram Sargsyan was elected president of the federation.

== Activities ==
The Armenian Automobile Federation organizes and supports motorsport and automotive activities in Armenia, including karting, rally, drift, autocross, drag racing, off-road, historic car activities and e-sports. It also provides sport licensing and supports Armenian participation in national and international motorsport competitions.

The federation works with affiliated clubs and automotive organizations in Armenia, including motorsport, tuning, drift, off-road and historic car clubs. These clubs contribute to grassroots participation, event organization and the promotion of automotive culture in Armenia.

Several prominent racing drivers of Armenian descent have competed internationally under other national sporting authorities, including four-time Formula One World Champion Alain Prost and endurance racing driver Nicolas Minassian. In the FAA licensing context, Artur Goroyan became the first Armenian racing driver to compete internationally with a FAA-issued B Category International Licence, with Armenian media reporting his use of the ARM 001 licence in qualification races at the Nürburgring. The FAA sport programme has also referred to a karting academy developed by Goroyan and FAA coaches.

== Road safety and mobility ==
In addition to motorsport, the federation is active in road safety and mobility initiatives. FAA states that since joining the FIA Road Safety National Council in 2006, it has supported road safety education, driving skills programmes and responsible driving initiatives in Armenia.

In 2023 and 2024, the FAA implemented the FIA School Assessment Toolkit initiative in Armenia, in collaboration with the Association of Official Representatives of Automobile Manufacturers and with support from the FIA Safe and Sustainable Mobility Grants Programme. The year-long project assessed road safety around schools in Gyumri and Vanadzor using the International Road Assessment Programme's Star Rating for Schools methodology.

According to the FIA, 40 schools were assessed in Gyumri and Vanadzor, with 25 receiving one-star ratings before interventions. Following improvements, Gyumri Community School No. 24 reached a five-star safety rating, while Vanadzor Community School No. 10 reached a 4.7-star rating. The FIA stated that 400 students benefited from the programme.

In April 2026, Armenia was among 11 FIA Region I Coordination Forum for Eastern and Central European Clubs member countries represented at the first regional seminar of the UNITAR-powered FIA Safe Mobility 4 All & 4 Life programme. The programme, developed by the FIA in collaboration with the United Nations Institute for Training and Research and with support from the FIA Foundation, aims to support member clubs and public authorities through training, mentoring and evidence-based road safety projects.

== Automobile tourism and services ==
The federation provides services related to automobile tourism and mobility, including support for driving lessons, evacuation services and international vehicle travel documentation.

In 2024, the FIA Activity Report stated that the Automobile Federation of Armenia and the Georgian Automobile Sport Federation had been approved to join the Carnet de Passages en Douane (CPD) Network and would begin issuing CPDs after training.

== International development and FIA programmes ==
The federation has participated in FIA development and training programmes. In 2024, Armenia was among the countries represented in the fourth edition of the FIA Immersion Programme, which brought together 17 emerging motorsport leaders from FIA member clubs. The programme included sessions in Paris, Geneva, Valleiry and at the Rallye du Mont-Blanc, covering FIA operations, mobility, communications, motorsport funding, safety, technical matters, compliance, sustainability, diversity and inclusion.

In February 2026, a senior FIA sport and mobility delegation visited Armenia for meetings with Armenian government officials and the Automobile Federation of Armenia. The FIA stated that the visit focused on the development of motorsport participation and safer, more affordable and sustainable mobility in Armenia.

During the visit, FIA officials met representatives of the Armenian government, including officials from the ministries responsible for education, sport, economy, infrastructure and high-tech industry, as well as the Chief of Staff to the Prime Minister. The FIA article also identified Aram Sargsyan, then Vice President of the Automobile Federation of Armenia, as FIA Region I COFO Vice Chair.

In the same article, the FIA stated that FAA had led Armenia's recent progress, including the adoption of the FIA Affordable Cross Car project, which provides FIA member clubs with blueprints to manufacture low-cost cross cars using local materials and labour for accessible entry-level motorsport disciplines such as rally and rallycross.

== See also ==
- Automobile associations
- Sport in Armenia
- Transport in Armenia
- Motorsport in Armenia
- Fédération Internationale de l'Automobile
- FIA Karting
- Artur Goroyan
