= 2022 Dubai 24 Hour =

The layout of the Dubai Autodrome.

The 2022 Hankook Dubai 24 Hour was the 17th running of the Dubai 24 Hour, an endurance race that took place at the Dubai Autodrome on 14 and 15 January 2022. It was also the first round of the 2022 24H GT Series and TCE Series. The race was won by Axcil Jefferies, Christopher Mies, Thomas Neubauer, Mohammed Saud Fahad Al Saud and Dries Vanthoor in the MS7 by WRT Audi R8 LMS Evo.

== Schedule ==
Date	Time (local: GST)	Event	Distance
Thursday, 13 January	12:15 - 13:45	Practice (All cars)	90 mins
Thursday, 13 January	14:35 - 15:21	Qualifying 1-3 - TCE	3 x 12 Mins
Thursday, 13 January	15:30 - 16:00	Qualifying 1-3 - GT	3 x 12 Mins
Thursday, 13 January	18:00 - 19:30	Night Practice (All cars)	90 mins
Friday, 14 January	10:30 - 11:00	Warm up	30 mins
Friday, 14 January	15:00	Race	24 Hours
Saturday, 15 January	15:00	Race	24 Hours

== Entry list ==
80 cars are entered into the event; 61 GT cars and 19 TCEs. 2 cars were removed from the entry list after crashes in private test sessions.

Team	Car	Engine	No.	Drivers
GT3-Pro (13 entries)
(Germany) (Oman) / Mercedes-AMG Team HRT Bilstein (Note: Car No. 4 entered as Mercedes-AMG Team HRT Bilstein and car No. 777 entered as Al Manar Racing by HRT.); (Germany) (Oman) / AL Manar Racing by HRT	Mercedes-AMG GT3 Evo	Mercedes-AMG M159 6.2 L V8	4	(United Arab Emirates) Khaled Al Qubaisi (Germany) Hubert Haupt (Switzerland) Raffaele Marciello (Germany) Manuel Metzger
(Germany) (Oman) / Mercedes-AMG Team HRT Bilstein; (Germany) (Oman) / AL Manar Racing by HRT	Mercedes-AMG GT3 Evo	Mercedes-AMG M159 6.2 L V8	777	(Oman) Al Faisal Al Zubair (Netherlands) Indy Dontje (Austria) Martin Konrad (Germany) Luca Stolz
(Saudi Arabia) (Belgium) / MS7 by WRT (Note: Car No. 7 entered as MS7 by WRT and car No. 31 entered as Belgian Audi Club Team WRT.); (Saudi Arabia) (Belgium) / Belgian Audi Club Team WRT	Audi R8 LMS Evo	Audi 5.2 L V10	7	(Zimbabwe) Axcil Jefferies (Germany) Christopher Mies (France) Thomas Neubauer (Saudi Arabia) Mohammed Saud Fahad Al Saud (Belgium) Dries Vanthoor
(Saudi Arabia) (Belgium) / MS7 by WRT; (Saudi Arabia) (Belgium) / Belgian Audi Club Team WRT	Audi R8 LMS Evo	Audi 5.2 L V10	31	(Monaco) Benjamin Goethe (France) Arnold Robin (France) Maxime Robin (France) Jean-Baptiste Simmenauer (Belgium) Frédéric Vervisch
(Germany) Leipert Motorsport	Lamborghini Huracán GT3 Evo	Lamborghini 5.2 L V10	10	(United States) Jean-Francois Brunot (Chinese Taipei) Betty Chen (Sweden) Joel Eriksson (New Zealand) Brendon Leitch (United States) Kerong Li
(Canada) ST Racing	BMW M4 GT3	BMW S58B30T0 3.0 L Turbo V8	28	(United States) Chandler Hull (United States) Jon Miller (Canada) Louis-Philippe Montour (Canada) Nick Wittmer
(Germany) Schubert Motorsport	BMW M4 GT3	BMW S58B30T0 3.0 L Turbo V8	30	(Germany) Marcel Lenerz (Germany) Jens Liebhauser (United Kingdom) Jordan Witt (United Kingdom) Nick Yelloly
(Italy) Dinamic Motorsport	Porsche 911 GT3 R (2019)	Porsche 4.0 L Flat-6	54	(Austria) Klaus Bachler (Germany) Marvin Dienst (Russia) Stanislav Minsky (Germany) Marco Seefried (Germany) Murad Sultanov
(Italy) Dinamic Motorsport	Porsche 911 GT3 R (2019)	Porsche 4.0 L Flat-6	67	(Italy) Matteo Cairoli (Switzerland) Mauro Calamia (Switzerland) Stefano Monaco (Italy) Roberto Pampanini
(Australia) SunEnergy1 by SPS automotive performance	Mercedes-AMG GT3 Evo	Mercedes-AMG M159 6.2 L V8	75	(Germany) Maro Engel (France) Jules Gounon (Canada) Mikaël Grenier (Australia) Kenny Habul
(United Kingdom) Barwell Motorsport	Lamborghini Huracán GT3 Evo	Lamborghini 5.2 L V10	77	(Switzerland) Adrian Amstutz (Italy) Mirko Bortolotti (Netherlands) Rik Breukers (Switzerland) Rolf Ineichen
(Australia) Grove Motorsport by Herberth Motorsport	Porsche 911 GT3 R	Porsche 4.0 L Flat-6	92	(Australia) Brenton Grove (Australia) Stephen Grove (Germany) Sven Müller (Australia) Anton de Pasquale
(Germany) Attempto Racing	Audi R8 LMS Evo	Audi 5.2 L V10	99	(Germany) Alex Aka (Germany) Luca Engstler (United Kingdom) Finlay Hutchison (Austria) Nicolas Schöll (Germany) Florian Scholze
GT3-Pro Am (5 entries)
(Canada) ST Racing	BMW M4 GT3	BMW S58B30T0 3.0 L Turbo V8	1	(United States) Harry Gottsacker (United States) Anthony Lazzaro (United States) Tyler Maxson (United States) Bryson Morris (Canada) Samantha Tan
(Netherlands) MP Motorsport	Mercedes-AMG GT3 Evo	Mercedes-AMG M159 6.2 L V8	19	(Netherlands) Bert de Heus (Netherlands) Daniël de Jong (Netherlands) Henk de Jong (Netherlands) Jaap van Lagen
(Germany) Team Joos Sportwagentechnik	Porsche 911 GT3 R	Porsche 4.0 L Flat-6	27	(Germany) Friedel Bleifuss (Germany) Jannes Fittje (Germany) Steffen Görig (Germany) Michael Joos
(France) Racetivity	Mercedes-AMG GT3 Evo	Mercedes-AMG M159 6.2 L V8	83	(France) Emmanuel Collard (France) François Perrodo (France) Charles-Henri Samani (France) Matthieu Vaxivière
(Luxembourg) DUWO Racing by Herberth Motorsport	Porsche 911 GT3 R	Porsche 4.0 L Flat-6	93	(Russia) Andrey Mukovoz (Russia) Sergey Peregudov (Luxembourg) Dylan Pereira (Russia) Stanislav Sidoruk
GT3-Am (9 entries)
(Germany) Car Collection Motorsport	Audi R8 LMS Evo	Audi 5.2 L V10	3	(Armenia) Artur Goroyan (Germany) Patrick Kolb (Germany) Martin Lechmann (Russia) Roman Mavlanov (Germany) Jörg Viebahn
(Germany) Car Collection Motorsport	Audi R8 LMS Evo	Audi 5.2 L V10	34	(Germany) Gustav Edelhoff (Germany) Max Edelhoff (Germany) Elmar Grimm (Germany) Johannes Dr. Kirchhoff (Germany) Ingo Vogler
(Russia) CapitalRT-Yadro	Mercedes-AMG GT3 Evo	Mercedes-AMG M159 6.2 L V8	13	(Russia) Dmitry Gvazava (Russia) Denis Remenyako (Russia) Victor Shaytar (Russia) Sergey Stolyarov
(Germany) SPS automotive performance	Mercedes-AMG GT3 Evo	Mercedes-AMG M159 6.2 L V8	20	(Saudi Arabia) Reema Juffali (United States) George Kurtz (United Kingdom) Ian Loggie (Germany) Valentin Pierburg
(France) Saintéloc Racing	Audi R8 LMS Evo	Audi 5.2 L V10	26	(France) Olivier Esteves (France) Simon Gachet (Luxembourg) Christian Keldersn (Belgium) Pierre-Yves Paque
(Germany) PROsport Performance AMR	Aston Martin Vantage AMR GT3	Aston Martin 4.0 L Turbo V8	39	(Belgium) Simon Balcaen (Belgium) Guillaume Dumarey (Belgium) Maxime Dumarey (Belgium) Jean Glorieux
(Slovakia) ARC Bratislava	Lamborghini Huracán GT3	Lamborghini 5.2 L V10	44	(United Kingdom) Tom Jackson (Slovakia) Mat'o Konôpka (Slovakia) Miro Konôpka (Poland) Andrzej Lewandowski (Slovakia) Zdeno Mikulasko
(United States) CP Racing	Mercedes-AMG GT3 Evo	Mercedes-AMG M159 6.2 L V8	85	(United States) Charles Espenlaub (United States) Shane Lewis (United States) Charles Putman (United Kingdom) Phil Quaife
(United Kingdom) Duel Racing with TF Sport	Aston Martin Vantage AMR GT3	Aston Martin 4.0 L Turbo V8	95	(Oman) Ahmad Al Harthy (United Arab Emirates) Nabil Moutran (United Arab Emirates) Ramzi Moutran (United Arab Emirates) Sami Moutran
GTX (4 entries)
(France) Vortex V8	Vortex 1.0 GTX	Chevrolet 6.2 L V8	701	(France) Lionel Amrouche (France) Philippe Bonnel (France) Cyril Calmon (France) Sebastien Lajoux
(Belgium) PK Carsport	Audi R8 LMS GT2	Audi 5.2 L V10	704	(Belgium) Peter Guelinckx (Belgium) Bert Longin (Belgium) Stienes Longin (Belgium) Stijn Lowette
(Germany) Leipert Motorsport	Lamborghini Huracán Super Trofeo Evo	Lamborghini 5.2 L V10	710	(United States) Erik Davis (United States) Gregg Gorski (Germany) Fidel Leib (United States) Gerhard Watzinger (France) Alban Varutti
(Austria) Razoon - More than Racing	KTM X-Bow GT2 Concept	Audi 2.5 L I5	714	(Austria) Daniel Drexel (Austria) Andreas Höfler (Austria) Dominik Olbert (Austria) Kevin Raith (Austria) Robert Schiftner
992-Pro (7 entries)
(Netherlands) Red Camel-Jordans.nl	Porsche 992 GT3 Cup	Porsche 4.0 L Flat-6	909	(Lithuania) Julius Adomavičius (Netherlands) Jeroen Bleekemolen (Netherlands) Ivo Breukers (Netherlands) Morris Schuring
(Netherlands) Team GP-Elite	Porsche 992 GT3 Cup	Porsche 4.0 L Flat-6	933	(Netherlands) Roger Hodenius (Netherlands) Larry ten Voorde (Netherlands) Steven van Rhee (Netherlands) Thierry Vermeulen
(Netherlands) Team GP-Elite	Porsche 992 GT3 Cup	Porsche 4.0 L Flat-6	934	(Netherlands) Lucas Groeneveld (Netherlands) Daan van Kuijk (Netherlands) Jesse van Kuijk (Netherlands) Max van Splunteren
(Germany) (United Arab Emirates) / ID Racing (Note: Car No. 940 and car. no 944 entered as ID Racing and car no. 977 RABDAN Motorsports by ID Racing.); (Germany) (United Arab Emirates) / RABDAN Motorsports by ID Racing	Porsche 992 GT3 Cup	Porsche 4.0 L Flat-6	940	(Lithuania) Audrius Butkevicius (United States) Vincent Piemonte (Switzerland) Adrian Spescha (Hong Kong) Shaun Thong
(Germany) (United Arab Emirates) / ID Racing; (Germany) (United Arab Emirates) / RABDAN Motorsports by ID Racing	Porsche 992 GT3 Cup	Porsche 4.0 L Flat-6	944	(Kazakhstan) Alexandr Artemyev (Finland) Jukka Honkavuori (United Arab Emirates) Bashar Mardini (Austria) Philipp Sager (Austria) Christopher Zöchling
(Germany) (United Arab Emirates) / ID Racing; (Germany) (United Arab Emirates) / RABDAN Motorsports by ID Racing	Porsche 992 GT3 Cup	Porsche 4.0 L Flat-6	977	(United Arab Emirates) Saif Al Ameri (United Arab Emirates) Salem Al Ketbi (United Arab Emirates) Helal Ali Mazrouei (United Arab Emirates) Fahad Al Zaabi (United Arab Emirates) Saeed Almheir
(Switzerland) Fach Auto Tech	Porsche 992 GT3 Cup	Porsche 4.0 L Flat-6	962	(Brazil) Atila Abreu (Brazil) Georgios Frangulis (Brazil) Eduardo Menossi (Brazil) Leonardo Sanchez Secundino (Brazil) Rouman Zimekiewicz
992-Am (9 entries)
(Belgium) Red Ant Racing	Porsche 992 GT3 Cup	Porsche 4.0 L Flat-6	904	(Belgium) Tom Boonen (Belgium) Kurt Hensen (Netherlands) Luc Vanderfeesten (Belgium) Philippe Wils
(Germany) Huber Racing	Porsche 992 GT3 Cup	Porsche 4.0 L Flat-6	923	(Italy) Enrico Fulgenzi (Germany) Matthias Hoffsümmer (Germany) Laurin Heinrich (Luxembourg) Gabriel Rindone
(Germany) Huber Racing	Porsche 992 GT3 Cup	Porsche 4.0 L Flat-6	924	(Russia) Evgeny Kireev (Russia) Merabi Mekvabishvili (Germany) Hendrik Still (Germany) Wolfgang Triller
(Germany) HRT Performance	Porsche 992 GT3 Cup	Porsche 4.0 L Flat-6	928	(Sweden) Erik Behrens (Sweden) Tommy Gråberg (Sweden) Hans Holmlund (Sweden) Daniel Roos
(Germany) HRT Performance	Porsche 992 GT3 Cup	Porsche 4.0 L Flat-6	929	(Sweden) Gustav Bard (Sweden) Gustav Bergström (Sweden) Henric Skoog (Sweden) Patrik Skoog
(Germany) HRT Performance	Porsche 992 GT3 Cup	Porsche 4.0 L Flat-6	930	(Germany) Stefan Aust (Russia) Nikolai Gadetskii (Germany) Holger Harmsen (United Kingdom) JM Littman
(Germany) HRT Performance	Porsche 992 GT3 Cup	Porsche 4.0 L Flat-6	931	(Saudi Arabia) Saeed Al Mour (France) Michael Blanchemain (Germany) Lars Dahmann (France) Cyril Saleilles (Australia) Marcel Zalloua
(Switzerland) Fach Auto Tech	Porsche 992 GT3 Cup	Porsche 4.0 L Flat-6	961	(Switzerland) Alexander Fach (Switzerland) Dominik Fischli (Switzerland) Peter Hegglin (Switzerland) Jan Klingelnberg (Switzerland) Marcel Wagner
(Belgium) Speed Lover	Porsche 992 GT3 Cup	Porsche 4.0 L Flat-6	979	(Netherlands) John de Wilde (Belgium) Olivier Dons (Belgium) Jean-Michel Gerome (France) Eric Mouez (Belgium) Brent Verheyen
991 (3 entries)
(Belgium) Red Ant Racing	Porsche 991 GT3 Cup II	Porsche 4.0 L Flat-6	903	(Belgium) Pieter Ooms (Belgium) Glenn van Parijs (Belgium) Ayrton Redant (Belgium) Yannick Redant
(Italy) Willi Motorsport by Ebimotors	Porsche 991 GT3 Cup II	Porsche 4.0 L Flat-6	955	(Italy) Fabrizio Broggi (Italy) Sabino de Castro (Romania) Sergiu Nicolae
(Netherlands) NKPP Racing by Bas Koeten Racing	Porsche 991 GT3 Cup II	Porsche 4.0 L Flat-6	991	(Netherlands) Gijs Bessem (Netherlands) Bob Herber (Netherlands) Harry Hilders (Netherlands) Daan Meijer
GT4 (11 entries)
(Germany) PROsport Performance AMR	Aston Martin Vantage AMR GT4	Aston Martin 4.0 L Turbo V8	401	(Belgium) Guido Dumarey (Belgium) Rodrigue Gillion (Germany) Mike David Ortmann (Germany) Hugo Sasse (Belgium) Nico Verdonck
(South Korea) AtlasBX Motorsports	Mercedes-AMG GT4	Mercedes-AMG M178 4.0 L V8	403	(Netherlands) Roelof Bruins (Canada) Steven Cho (South Korea) Jong Kyum Kim (South Korea) Yong Hyeok Yang
(United Arab Emirates) Dragon Racing	Mercedes-AMG GT4	Mercedes-AMG M178 4.0 L V8	408	(Germany) Oliver Goethe (Germany) Roald Goethe (South Africa) Jordan Grogor (United Kingdom) Stuart Hall
(Germany) Heide Motorsport	Audi R8 LMS GT4 Evo	Audi 5.2 L V10	411	(United States) Cabell Fisher (Germany) Sophie Hofmann (Germany) Ulrich Kainzinger (Germany) Daniel Karl (Germany) Heinz Schmersal
(Denmark) Jönsson consult / eva solo	Mercedes-AMG GT4	Mercedes-AMG M178 4.0 L V8	415	(Denmark) Claus Bertelsen (Denmark) Henrik Bollerslev (Denmark) Jan Engelbrecht (Denmark) Søren Jönsson
(United States) Heart of Racing Team	Aston Martin Vantage AMR GT4	Aston Martin 4.0 L Turbo V8	423	(Canada) Roman De Angelis (United Kingdom) Ian James (United States) Gray Newell (Spain) Alex Riberas
(United Kingdom) (United States) / Century Motorsport (Note: Cars No. 429 entered as Century Motorsport and car no. 450 entered as RHC Jorgensen-Strom by Century.); (United Kingdom) (United States) / RHC Jorgensen-Strom by Century	BMW M4 GT4	BMW N55 3.0 L Twin-Turbo I6	429	(Russia) Alex Bukhanstov (United Kingdom) Andrew Gordon-Colebrooke (United Kingdom) George King (United Kingdom) James Winslow
(United Kingdom) (United States) / Century Motorsport; (United Kingdom) (United States) / RHC Jorgensen-Strom by Century	BMW M4 GT4	BMW N55 3.0 L Twin-Turbo I6	450	(Netherlands) Danny van Dongen (United Kingdom) Nathan Freke (United States) Daren Jorgensen (United States) Brett Strom
(Germany) Team Avia Sorg Rennsport	BMW M4 GT4	BMW N55 3.0 L Twin-Turbo I6	451	(Germany) Stefan Beyer (Germany) Stephan Epp (Germany) Olaf Mayer (Denmark) Michael Nielsen (Germany) Björn Simon
(Germany) Team Avia Sorg Rennsport	BMW M4 GT4	BMW N55 3.0 L Twin-Turbo I6	452	(United Arab Emirates) Ahmed Al Melaihi (Ukraine) Dmytro Ryzhak (Mexico) Francisco Sapien (Mexico) Benito Tagle (Germany) Hans Joachim Theiss
(United Kingdom) CWS Engineering	Ginetta G56 GT4	GM LS3 6.2 L V8	478	(United Kingdom) James Jakes (United Kingdom) Mike Simpson (United Kingdom) Lawrence Tomlinson (United Kingdom) Colin White
TCR (8 entries)
(Denmark) Holmgaard Motorsport	Volkswagen Golf GTI TCR	Volkswagen 2.0 L I4	102	(United Kingdom) Sam Neary (Denmark) Jonas Holmgaard (Denmark) Magnus Holmgaard (Denmark) Thomas Sørensen (United Kingdom) Andie Stokoe
(Germany) Passion Performance Motorsports	CUPRA León TCR	Volkswagen 2.0 L I4	103	(United Arab Emirates) Mohammed Al Owais (Germany) Christian Ladurner (Germany) Marco Santamaria (Jordan) Nadir Zuhour
(Switzerland) Autorama Motorsport by Wolf-Power Racing	Volkswagen Golf GTI TCR	Volkswagen 2.0 L I4	111	(Switzerland) Fabian Danz (Austria) Constantin Kletzer (Switzerland) Jasmin Preisig (Netherlands) Paul Sieljes
(Switzerland) Autorama Motorsport by Wolf-Power Racing	Volkswagen Golf GTI TCR	Volkswagen 2.0 L I4	112	(Lithuania) Vytenis Gulbinas (Germany) Henry Littig (United Kingdom) Alex Morgan (Estonia) Antti Rammo (Brazil) Gustavo Xavier
(Switzerland) Autorama Motorsport by Wolf-Power Racing	Audi RS 3 LMS TCR (2021)	Volkswagen 2.0 L I4	116	(United Kingdom) Robert Huff (Germany) Markus Menden (Germany) Marlon Menden (United Kingdom) Alex Morgan (Germany) Peter Posavac
(Hungary) Zengő Motorsport	CUPRA León TCR	Volkswagen 2.0 L I4	133	(Hungary) Tamás Horváth (Hungary) Gábor Kismarty-Lechner (Hungary) Ga'l Szabolcs (Hungary) Csaba Tóth (Hungary) Zoltan Zengö
(Thailand) BBR - Billionaire Boys Racing	CUPRA León TCR	Volkswagen 2.0 L I4	159	(Thailand) Anusorn Asiralertsiri (Thailand) Kantadhee Kusiri (Thailand) Kantasak Kusiri (Thailand) Pasarit Promsombat (Thailand) Tanart Sathienthirakul
(Belgium) AC Motorsport	Audi RS 3 LMS TCR (2017)	Volkswagen 2.0 L I4	188	(Switzerland) Miklas Born (Belgium) Mathieu Detry (Switzerland) Yannick Mettler (France) Stéphane Perrin
TCX (11 entries)
(Germany) Schubert Motorsport	BMW M2 ClubSport Racing	BMW S55B30T0 3.0 L I6	200	(Germany) Torsten Schubert (Germany) Michael von Zabiensky (Germany) Stefan von Zabiensky
(France) Les Deux Arbres	Ligier JS2 R	Ford 3.7 L V6	202	(France) Jack Leconte (France) Antoine Lepesqueux (France) Christophe Bouchut (Switzerland) Patrick Zacchia (Switzerland) Steve Zacchia
(France) Orhes Racing	Ligier JS2 R	Ford 3.7 L V6	207	(France) Micael Costa (France) Franck Dallavalle (France) José Fernandes (France) Benjamin Riviere (France) Rocco Spano
(Germany) Yeeti Racing	BMW M2 ClubSport Racing	BMW S55B30T0 3.0 L I6	208	(Germany) Phil Hill (Denmark) Thomas Krebs (United States) Hanna Zellers (Italy) Domenico Solombrino
(Denmark) Sally Racing	CUPRA León TCR	Volkswagen 2.0 L I4	219	(Denmark) Morten Eriksen (Denmark) Niels Nyboe (Denmark) Peter Obel (Denmark) Henrik Thomsen
(France) (Luxembourg) / Lamera GT (Note: Car No. 222 entered as Lamera GT and No. 223 entered as Lamera GT LUX.); (France) (Luxembourg) / Lamera GT LUX	Lamera GT	Volvo 2.5 L I5	222	(France) Pierre Couasnon (France) Franck Dezoteux (France) Grégory Fargier (France) Wilfried Merafina
(France) (Luxembourg) / Lamera GT; (France) (Luxembourg) / Lamera GT LUX	Lamera GT	Volvo 2.5 L I5	223	(France) Sébastien Guignard (France) Mattéo Mérafina (France) Thomas Mérafina (Luxembourg) Tommy Rollinger
(France) COGEMO/TLRT	BMW M2 ClubSport Racing	BMW S55B30T0 3.0 L I6	255	(France) André Grammatico (France) Antoine Lacosta (France) Sebastian Morales (France) Philippe Thirion
(United Kingdom) CWS Engineering	Ginetta G55 Supercup	Ford Cyclone 3.7 L V6	278	(France) Alain Bucher (United Kingdom) Finlay Hutchinson (United States) Matthew Ibrahim (United Kingdom) Darren Leung (United Kingdom) Bobby Thompson
(France) CTF Performance	Ligier JS2 R	Ford 3.7 L V6	295	(France) Nicolas Beraud (France) Fabien Delaplace (France) Laurent Pigeut (France) Gilles Poret
(France) CTF Performance	Ligier JS2 R	Ford 3.7 L V6	296	(France) Nicolas Beraud (France) Fabien Delaplace (France) Laurent Pigeut (France) Gilles Poret

== Results ==
=== Qualifying ===
Both GT and TCE qualifying sessions featured three parts, all of which would feature one driver in every car, an average lap time would be taken and applied to every car.

==== GT ====
Fastest in class in **bold**.

Pos.	Class	No.	Team	Time
1	**GT3-Pro**	**7**	**(Saudi Arabia) MS7 by WRT**	**1:58.684**
2	GT3-Pro	4	(Germany) Mercedes-AMG Team HRT Bilstein	1:58.978
3	GT3-Pro	777	(Qatar) AL Manar Racing by HRT	1:59.060
4	GT3-Pro	92	(Germany) Herberth Motorsport	1:59.126
5	GT3-Pro	54	(Italy) Dinamic Motorsport	1:59.194
6	GT3-Pro	75	(Australia) SunEnergy1 by SPS automotive performance	1:59.352
7	GT3-Pro	31	(Belgium) Belgian Audi Club Team WRT	1:59.415
8	GT3-Pro	77	(United Kingdom) Barwell Motorsport	1:59.416
9	**GT3-Pro Am**	**19**	**(Netherlands) MP Motorsport**	**1:59.527**
10	GT3-Pro	99	(Germany) Attempto Racing	1:59.858
11	**GT3-Am**	**85**	**(United States) CP Racing**	**1:59.950**
12	GT3-Pro	67	(Italy) Dinamic Motorsport	2:00.110
13	GT3-Pro Am	83	(France) Racetivity	2:00.183
14	GT3-Am	13	(Russia) CapitalRT-Yadro	2:00.262
15	GT3-Pro Am	1	(Canada) ST Racing	2:00.563
16	GT3-Pro Am	27	(Germany) Team Joos Sportwagentechnik	2:00.635
17	GT3-Am	39	(Germany) PROsport Performance AMR	2:00.792
18	GT3-Pro Am	93	(Luxembourg) DUWO Racing by Herberth Motorsport	2:00.895
19	GT3-Pro	30	(Germany) Schubert Motorsport	2:00.936
20	GT3-Pro	28	(Canada) ST Racing	2:01.113
21	GT3-Am	3	(Germany) Car Collection Motorsport	2:01.129
22	GT3-Am	20	(Germany) SPS automotive performance	2:01.366
23	GT3-Am	95	(United Kingdom) Duel Racing with TF Sport	2:01.456
24	GT3-Pro	10	(Germany) Leipert Motorsport	2:01.484
25	GT3-Am	34	(Germany) Car Collection Motorsport	2:01.825
26	GT3-Am	26	(France) Saintéloc Racing	2:02.842
27	**992-Pro**	**934**	**(Netherlands) Team GP-Elite**	**2:02.931**
28	992-Pro	909	(Netherlands) Red Camel-Jordans.nl	2:03.221
29	992-Pro	944	(Germany) ID Racing	2:03.395
30	**GTX**	**710**	**(Germany) Leipert Motorsport**	**2:03.507**
31	GTX	704	(Belgium) PK Carsport	2:03.594
32	**992-Am**	**923**	**(Germany) Huber Racing**	**2:03.841**
33	992-Am	929	(Germany) HRT Performance	2:03.848
34	992-Pro	934	(Netherlands) Team GP-Elite	2:03.903
35	992-Am	961	(Switzerland) Fach Auto Tech	2:03.930
36	GT3-Am	44	(Slovakia) ARC Bratislava	2:03.946
37	992-Am	928	(Germany) HRT Performance	2:04.037
38	992-Am	923	(Germany) Huber Racing	2:04.770
39	992-Pro	962	(Switzerland) Fach Auto Tech	2:04.959
40	GTX	714	(Austria) Razoon - More than Racing	2:05.667
41	**991**	**955**	**(Romania) Willi Motorsport by Ebimotors**	**2:06.276**
42	991	903	(Belgium) Redant Racing	2:06.545
43	992-Pro	940	(Germany) ID Racing	2:06.951
44	992-Pro	977	(United Arab Emirates) RABDAN Motorsports by ID Racing	2:07.132
45	992-Am	979	(Belgium) Speed Lover	2:07.140
46	992-Am	904	(Belgium) Redant Racing	2:07.217
47	992-Am	930	(Germany) HRT Performance	2:07.582
48	991	991	(Netherlands) NKPP Racing by Bas Koeten Racing	2:07.794
49	GTX	701	(France) Vortex 1.0	2:08.911
50	992-Am	931	(Germany) HRT Performance	2:08.933
51	**GT4**	**401**	**(Germany) PROsport Performance AMR**	**2:09.532**
52	GT4	423	(United States) Heart of Racing Team	2:09.537
53	GT4	408	(United Arab Emirates) Dragon Racing	2:09.749
54	GT4	478	(United Kingdom) CWS Engineering	2:10.255
55	GT4	450	(United States) RHC Jorgensen-Strom by Century	2:11.186
56	GT4	403	(South Korea) AtlasBX Motorsports	2:11.519
57	GT4	451	(Germany) Team Avia Sorg Rennsport	2:14.435
58	GT4	415	(Denmark) Jönsson consult / eva solo	2:15.476
59	GT4	411	(Germany) Heide Motorsport	2:17.384
60	GT4	429	(United Kingdom) Century Motorsport	2:11.792 (Note: The No. 429 Century Motorsport car only set a time in Q1 and Q2.)
61	GT4	452	(Germany) Team Avia Sorg Rennsport	No time

==== TCE ====
Fastest in class in **bold**.

Pos.	Class	No.	Team	Time
1	**TCX**	**202**	**(France) Les Deux Arbres**	**2:09.724**
2	TCX	222	(France) Lamera GT	2:10.236
3	**TCR**	**116**	**(Switzerland) Autorama Motorsport by Wolf-Power Racing**	**2:10.813**
4	TCR	159	(Thailand) BBR - Billionaire Boys Racing	2:11.003
5	TCR	188	(Belgium) AC Motorsport	2:11.277
6	TCX	295	(France) CTF Performance	2:11.355
7	TCX	223	(Luxembourg) Lamera GT LUX	2:11.890
8	TCX	207	(France) Orhes Racing	2:12.180
9	TCR	102	(Denmark) Holmgaard Motorsport	2:12.453
10	TCR	111	(Switzerland) Autorama Motorsport by Wolf-Power Racing	2:12.523
11	TCR	112	(Switzerland) Autorama Motorsport by Wolf-Power Racing	2:12.666
12	TCX	208	(Germany) Yeeti Racing	2:14.517
13	TCX	200	(Germany) Schubert Motorsport	2:14.730
14	TCX	255	(France) COGEMO/TLRT	2:15.386
15	TCX	219	(Denmark) Team Sally Racing	2:17.604
16	TCX	278	(United Kingdom) CWS Engineering	2:12.023 (Note: The No. 278 CWS Engineering car only set a time in Q2 and Q3.)
17	TCR	103	(Germany) Passion Performance Motorsports	No time
18	TCR	133	(Hungary) Zengő Motorsport	No time
19	TCX	296	(France) CTF Performance	No time

=== Race ===
Class winner in bold.

Pos	Class	No.	Team	Drivers	Chassis	Time/Reason	Laps
Pos	Class	No.	Team	Drivers	Engine	Time/Reason	Laps
1	**GT3-Pro**	**7**	**(Saudi Arabia) MS7 by WRT**	**(Zimbabwe) Axcil Jefferies (Germany) Christopher Mies (France) Thomas Neubauer (Saudi Arabia) Mohammed Saud Fahad Al Saud (Belgium) Dries Vanthoor**	**Audi R8 LMS Evo**	**24:01:31.454**	**596**
1	**GT3-Pro**	**7**	**(Saudi Arabia) MS7 by WRT**	**(Zimbabwe) Axcil Jefferies (Germany) Christopher Mies (France) Thomas Neubauer (Saudi Arabia) Mohammed Saud Fahad Al Saud (Belgium) Dries Vanthoor**	**Audi 5.2 L V10**	**24:01:31.454**	**596**
2	GT3-Pro	31	(Belgium) Team WRT	(Monaco) Benjamin Goethe (France) Arnold Robin (France) Maxime Robin (France) Jean-Baptiste Simmenauer (Belgium) Frédéric Vervisch	Audi R8 LMS Evo	+1 Lap	595
2	GT3-Pro	31	(Belgium) Team WRT	(Monaco) Benjamin Goethe (France) Arnold Robin (France) Maxime Robin (France) Jean-Baptiste Simmenauer (Belgium) Frédéric Vervisch	Audi 5.2 L V10	+1 Lap	595
3	GT3-Pro	75	(Australia) SunEnergy1 by SPS automotive performance	(Germany) Maro Engel (France) Jules Gounon (Canada) Mikaël Grenier (Australia) Kenny Habul	Mercedes-AMG GT3 Evo	+3 Laps	593
3	GT3-Pro	75	(Australia) SunEnergy1 by SPS automotive performance	(Germany) Maro Engel (France) Jules Gounon (Canada) Mikaël Grenier (Australia) Kenny Habul	Mercedes-AMG M159 6.2 L V8	+3 Laps	593
4	GT3-Pro	4	(Germany) Mercedes-AMG Team HRT Bilstein	(United Arab Emirates) Khaled Al Qubaisi (Germany) Hubert Haupt (Switzerland) Raffaele Marciello (Germany) Manuel Metzger	Mercedes-AMG GT3 Evo	+3 Laps	593
4	GT3-Pro	4	(Germany) Mercedes-AMG Team HRT Bilstein	(United Arab Emirates) Khaled Al Qubaisi (Germany) Hubert Haupt (Switzerland) Raffaele Marciello (Germany) Manuel Metzger	Mercedes-AMG M159 6.2 L V8	+3 Laps	593
5	GT3-Pro	777	(Oman) AL Manar Racing by HRT	(Oman) Al Faisal Al Zubair (Netherlands) Indy Dontje (Austria) Martin Konrad (Germany) Luca Stolz	Mercedes-AMG GT3 Evo	+7 Laps	589
5	GT3-Pro	777	(Oman) AL Manar Racing by HRT	(Oman) Al Faisal Al Zubair (Netherlands) Indy Dontje (Austria) Martin Konrad (Germany) Luca Stolz	Mercedes-AMG M159 6.2 L V8	+7 Laps	589
6	GT3-Pro	92	(Australia) Grove Motorsport by Herberth Motorsport	(Australia) Brenton Grove (Australia) Stephen Grove (Germany) Sven Müller (Australia) Anton de Pasquale	Porsche 911 GT3 R	+7 Laps	589
6	GT3-Pro	92	(Australia) Grove Motorsport by Herberth Motorsport	(Australia) Brenton Grove (Australia) Stephen Grove (Germany) Sven Müller (Australia) Anton de Pasquale	Porsche 4.0 L Flat-6	+7 Laps	589
7	GT3-Pro	99	(Germany) Attempto Racing	(Germany) Alex Aka (Germany) Luca Engstler (United Kingdom) Finlay Hutchison (Austria) Nicolas Schöll (Germany) Florian Scholze	Audi R8 LMS Evo	+9 Laps	587
7	GT3-Pro	99	(Germany) Attempto Racing	(Germany) Alex Aka (Germany) Luca Engstler (United Kingdom) Finlay Hutchison (Austria) Nicolas Schöll (Germany) Florian Scholze	Audi 5.2 L V10	+9 Laps	587
8	**GT3-Am**	**85**	**(United States) CP Racing**	**(United States) Charles Espenlaub (United States) Shane Lewis (United States) Charles Putman (United Kingdom) Phil Quaife**	**Mercedes-AMG GT3 Evo**	**+9 Laps**	**587**
8	**GT3-Am**	**85**	**(United States) CP Racing**	**(United States) Charles Espenlaub (United States) Shane Lewis (United States) Charles Putman (United Kingdom) Phil Quaife**	**Mercedes-AMG M159 6.2 L V8**	**+9 Laps**	**587**
9	GT3-Am	20	(Germany) SPS automotive performance	(Saudi Arabia) Reema Juffali (United States) George Kurtz (United Kingdom) Ian Loggie (Germany) Valentin Pierburg	Mercedes-AMG GT3 Evo	+11 Laps	585
9	GT3-Am	20	(Germany) SPS automotive performance	(Saudi Arabia) Reema Juffali (United States) George Kurtz (United Kingdom) Ian Loggie (Germany) Valentin Pierburg	Mercedes-AMG M159 6.2 L V8	+11 Laps	585
10	**GT3-Pro Am**	**20**	**(Netherlands) MP Motorsport**	**(Netherlands) Bert de Heus (Netherlands) Daniël de Jong (Netherlands) Henk de Jong (Netherlands) Jaap van Lagen**	**Mercedes-AMG GT3 Evo**	**+12 Laps**	**584**
10	**GT3-Pro Am**	**20**	**(Netherlands) MP Motorsport**	**(Netherlands) Bert de Heus (Netherlands) Daniël de Jong (Netherlands) Henk de Jong (Netherlands) Jaap van Lagen**	**Mercedes-AMG M159 6.2 L V8**	**+12 Laps**	**584**
11	GT3-Pro Am	27	(Germany) Team Joos Sportwagentechnik	(Germany) Friedel Bleifuss (Germany) Jannes Fittje (Germany) Steffen Görig (Germany) Michael Joos	Porsche 911 GT3 R	+12 Laps	584
11	GT3-Pro Am	27	(Germany) Team Joos Sportwagentechnik	(Germany) Friedel Bleifuss (Germany) Jannes Fittje (Germany) Steffen Görig (Germany) Michael Joos	Porsche 4.0 L Flat-6	+12 Laps	584
12	GT3-Pro Am	93	(Luxembourg) DUWO Racing by Herberth Motorsport	(Russia) Andrey Mukovoz (Russia) Sergey Peregudov (Luxembourg) Dylan Pereira (Russia) Stanislav Sidoruk	Porsche 911 GT3 R	+13 Laps	583
12	GT3-Pro Am	93	(Luxembourg) DUWO Racing by Herberth Motorsport	(Russia) Andrey Mukovoz (Russia) Sergey Peregudov (Luxembourg) Dylan Pereira (Russia) Stanislav Sidoruk	Porsche 4.0 L Flat-6	+13 Laps	583
13	GT3-Am	34	(Germany) Car Collection Motorsport	(Germany) Gustav Edelhoff (Germany) Max Edelhoff (Germany) Elmar Grimm (Germany) Johannes Dr. Kirchhoff (Germany) Ingo Vogler	Audi R8 LMS Evo	+16 Laps	580
13	GT3-Am	34	(Germany) Car Collection Motorsport	(Germany) Gustav Edelhoff (Germany) Max Edelhoff (Germany) Elmar Grimm (Germany) Johannes Dr. Kirchhoff (Germany) Ingo Vogler	Audi 5.2 L V10	+16 Laps	580
14	**992-Pro**	**934**	**(Netherlands) Team GP-Elite**	**(Netherlands) Lucas Groeneveld (Netherlands) Daan van Kuijk (Netherlands) Jesse van Kuijk (Netherlands) Max van Splunteren**	**Porsche 992 GT3 Cup**	**+20 Laps**	**576**
14	**992-Pro**	**934**	**(Netherlands) Team GP-Elite**	**(Netherlands) Lucas Groeneveld (Netherlands) Daan van Kuijk (Netherlands) Jesse van Kuijk (Netherlands) Max van Splunteren**	**Porsche 4.0 L Flat-6**	**+20 Laps**	**576**
15	GT3-Am	13	(Russia) CapitalRT-Yadro	(Russia) Dmitry Gvazava (Russia) Denis Remenyako (Russia) Victor Shaytar (Russia) Sergey Stolyarov	Mercedes-AMG GT3 Evo	+21 Laps	575
15	GT3-Am	13	(Russia) CapitalRT-Yadro	(Russia) Dmitry Gvazava (Russia) Denis Remenyako (Russia) Victor Shaytar (Russia) Sergey Stolyarov	Mercedes-AMG M159 6.2 L V8	+21 Laps	575
16	GT3-Pro	10	(Germany) Leipert Motorsport	(United States) Jean-Francois Brunot (Chinese Taipei) Betty Chen (Sweden) Joel Eriksson (New Zealand) Brendon Leitch (United States) Kerong Li	Lamborghini Huracán GT3 Evo	+23 Laps	573
16	GT3-Pro	10	(Germany) Leipert Motorsport	(United States) Jean-Francois Brunot (Chinese Taipei) Betty Chen (Sweden) Joel Eriksson (New Zealand) Brendon Leitch (United States) Kerong Li	Lamborghini 5.2 L V10	+23 Laps	573
17	GT3-Pro Am	83	(France) Racetivity	(France) Emmanuel Collard (France) François Perrodo (France) Charles-Henri Samani (France) Matthieu Vaxivière	Mercedes-AMG GT3 Evo	+24 Laps	572
17	GT3-Pro Am	83	(France) Racetivity	(France) Emmanuel Collard (France) François Perrodo (France) Charles-Henri Samani (France) Matthieu Vaxivière	Mercedes-AMG M159 6.2 L V8	+24 Laps	572
18	GT3-Am	44	(Slovakia) ARC Bratislava	(United Kingdom) Tom Jackson (Slovakia) Mat'o Konôpka (Slovakia) Miro Konôpka (Poland) Andrzej Lewandowski (Slovakia) Zdeno Mikulasko	Lamborghini Huracán GT3	+24 Laps	572
18	GT3-Am	44	(Slovakia) ARC Bratislava	(United Kingdom) Tom Jackson (Slovakia) Mat'o Konôpka (Slovakia) Miro Konôpka (Poland) Andrzej Lewandowski (Slovakia) Zdeno Mikulasko	Lamborghini 5.2 L V10	+24 Laps	572
19	GT3-Am	26	(France) Saintéloc Racing	(France) Olivier Esteves (France) Simon Gachet (Luxembourg) Christian Keldersn (Belgium) Pierre-Yves Paque	Audi R8 LMS Evo	+25 Laps	571
19	GT3-Am	26	(France) Saintéloc Racing	(France) Olivier Esteves (France) Simon Gachet (Luxembourg) Christian Keldersn (Belgium) Pierre-Yves Paque	Audi 5.2 L V10	+25 Laps	571
20	992-Pro	933	(Netherlands) Team GP-Elite	(Netherlands) Roger Hodenius (Netherlands) Larry ten Voorde (Netherlands) Steven van Rhee (Netherlands) Thierry Vermeulen	Porsche 992 GT3 Cup	+26 Laps	570
20	992-Pro	933	(Netherlands) Team GP-Elite	(Netherlands) Roger Hodenius (Netherlands) Larry ten Voorde (Netherlands) Steven van Rhee (Netherlands) Thierry Vermeulen	Porsche 4.0 L Flat-6	+26 Laps	570
21	GT3-Pro	28	(Canada) ST Racing	(United States) Chandler Hull (United States) Jon Miller (Canada) Louis-Philippe Montour (Canada) Nick Wittmer	BMW M4 GT3	+29 Laps	567
21	GT3-Pro	28	(Canada) ST Racing	(United States) Chandler Hull (United States) Jon Miller (Canada) Louis-Philippe Montour (Canada) Nick Wittmer	BMW S58B30T0 3.0 L Turbo V8	+29 Laps	567
22	992-Pro	909	(Netherlands) Red Camel-Jordans.nl	(Lithuania) Julius Adomavičius (Netherlands) Jeroen Bleekemolen (Netherlands) Ivo Breukers (Netherlands) Morris Schuring	Porsche 992 GT3 Cup	+30 Laps	566
22	992-Pro	909	(Netherlands) Red Camel-Jordans.nl	(Lithuania) Julius Adomavičius (Netherlands) Jeroen Bleekemolen (Netherlands) Ivo Breukers (Netherlands) Morris Schuring	Porsche 4.0 L Flat-6	+30 Laps	566
23	**992-Am**	**929**	**(Germany) HRT Performance**	**(Sweden) Gustav Bard (Sweden) Gustav Bergström (Sweden) Henric Skoog (Sweden) Patrik Skoog**	**Porsche 992 GT3 Cup**	**+31 Laps**	**565**
23	**992-Am**	**929**	**(Germany) HRT Performance**	**(Sweden) Gustav Bard (Sweden) Gustav Bergström (Sweden) Henric Skoog (Sweden) Patrik Skoog**	**Porsche 4.0 L Flat-6**	**+31 Laps**	**565**
24	**GTX**	**704**	**(Belgium) PK Carsport**	**(Belgium) Peter Guelinckx (Belgium) Bert Longin (Belgium) Stienes Longin (Belgium) Stijn Lowette**	**Audi R8 LMS GT2**	**+34 Laps**	**562**
24	**GTX**	**704**	**(Belgium) PK Carsport**	**(Belgium) Peter Guelinckx (Belgium) Bert Longin (Belgium) Stienes Longin (Belgium) Stijn Lowette**	**Audi 5.2 L V10**	**+34 Laps**	**562**
25	GT3-Pro Am	1	(Canada) ST Racing	(United States) Harry Gottsacker (United States) Anthony Lazzaro (United States) Tyler Maxson (United States) Bryson Morris (Canada) Samantha Tan	BMW M4 GT3	+35 Laps	561
25	GT3-Pro Am	1	(Canada) ST Racing	(United States) Harry Gottsacker (United States) Anthony Lazzaro (United States) Tyler Maxson (United States) Bryson Morris (Canada) Samantha Tan	BMW S58B30T0 3.0 L Turbo V8	+35 Laps	561
26	**991**	**991**	**(Netherlands) NKPP Racing by Bas Koeten Racing**	**(Netherlands) Gijs Bessem (Netherlands) Bob Herber (Netherlands) Harry Hilders (Netherlands) Daan Meijer**	**Porsche 991 GT3 Cup II**	**+37 Laps**	**559**
26	**991**	**991**	**(Netherlands) NKPP Racing by Bas Koeten Racing**	**(Netherlands) Gijs Bessem (Netherlands) Bob Herber (Netherlands) Harry Hilders (Netherlands) Daan Meijer**	**Porsche 4.0 L Flat-6**	**+37 Laps**	**559**
27	992-Am	904	(Belgium) Red Ant Racing	(Belgium) Tom Boonen (Belgium) Kurt Hensen (Netherlands) Luc Vanderfeesten (Belgium) Philippe Wils	Porsche 992 GT3 Cup	+39 Laps	557
27	992-Am	904	(Belgium) Red Ant Racing	(Belgium) Tom Boonen (Belgium) Kurt Hensen (Netherlands) Luc Vanderfeesten (Belgium) Philippe Wils	Porsche 4.0 L Flat-6	+39 Laps	557
28	992-Pro	977	(United Arab Emirates) RABDAN Motorsports by ID Racing	(United Arab Emirates) Saif Al Ameri (United Arab Emirates) Salem Al Ketbi (United Arab Emirates) Helal Ali Mazrouei (United Arab Emirates) Fahad Al Zaabi (United Arab Emirates) Saeed Almheir	Porsche 992 GT3 Cup	+43 Laps	553
28	992-Pro	977	(United Arab Emirates) RABDAN Motorsports by ID Racing	(United Arab Emirates) Saif Al Ameri (United Arab Emirates) Salem Al Ketbi (United Arab Emirates) Helal Ali Mazrouei (United Arab Emirates) Fahad Al Zaabi (United Arab Emirates) Saeed Almheir	Porsche 4.0 L Flat-6	+43 Laps	553
29	992-Am	928	(Germany) HRT Performance	(Sweden) Erik Behrens (Sweden) Tommy Gråberg (Sweden) Hans Holmlund (Sweden) Daniel Roos	Porsche 992 GT3 Cup	+46 Laps	550
29	992-Am	928	(Germany) HRT Performance	(Sweden) Erik Behrens (Sweden) Tommy Gråberg (Sweden) Hans Holmlund (Sweden) Daniel Roos	Porsche 4.0 L Flat-6	+46 Laps	550
30	**GT4**	**408**	**(United Arab Emirates) Dragon Racing**	**(Germany) Oliver Goethe (Germany) Roald Goethe (South Africa) Jordan Grogor (United Kingdom) Stuart Hall**	**Mercedes-AMG GT4**	**+48 Laps**	**548**
30	**GT4**	**408**	**(United Arab Emirates) Dragon Racing**	**(Germany) Oliver Goethe (Germany) Roald Goethe (South Africa) Jordan Grogor (United Kingdom) Stuart Hall**	**Mercedes-AMG M178 4.0 L V8**	**+48 Laps**	**548**
31	GT4	423	(United States) Heart of Racing Team	(Canada) Roman De Angelis (United Kingdom) Ian James (United States) Gray Newell (Spain) Alex Riberas	Aston Martin Vantage AMR GT4	+49 Laps	547
31	GT4	423	(United States) Heart of Racing Team	(Canada) Roman De Angelis (United Kingdom) Ian James (United States) Gray Newell (Spain) Alex Riberas	Aston Martin 4.0 L Turbo V8	+49 Laps	547
32	GT3-Am	39	(Germany) PROsport Performance AMR	(Belgium) Simon Balcaen (Belgium) Guillaume Dumarey (Belgium) Maxime Dumarey (Belgium) Jean Glorieux	Aston Martin Vantage AMR GT3	+51 Laps	545
32	GT3-Am	39	(Germany) PROsport Performance AMR	(Belgium) Simon Balcaen (Belgium) Guillaume Dumarey (Belgium) Maxime Dumarey (Belgium) Jean Glorieux	Aston Martin 4.0 L Turbo V8	+51 Laps	545
33	992-Pro	944	(Germany) ID Racing	(Kazakhstan) Alexandr Artemyev (Finland) Jukka Honkavuori (United Arab Emirates) Bashar Mardini (Austria) Philipp Sager (Austria) Christopher Zöchling	Porsche 992 GT3 Cup	+52 Laps	544
33	992-Pro	944	(Germany) ID Racing	(Kazakhstan) Alexandr Artemyev (Finland) Jukka Honkavuori (United Arab Emirates) Bashar Mardini (Austria) Philipp Sager (Austria) Christopher Zöchling	Porsche 4.0 L Flat-6	+52 Laps	544
34	GT3-Am	3	(Germany) Car Collection Motorsport	(Armenia) Artur Goroyan (Germany) Patrick Kolb (Germany) Martin Lechmann (Russia) Roman Mavlanov (Germany) Jörg Viebahn	Audi R8 LMS Evo	+53 Laps	543
34	GT3-Am	3	(Germany) Car Collection Motorsport	(Armenia) Artur Goroyan (Germany) Patrick Kolb (Germany) Martin Lechmann (Russia) Roman Mavlanov (Germany) Jörg Viebahn	Audi 5.2 L V10	+53 Laps	543
35	992-Am	930	(Germany) HRT Performance	(Germany) Stefan Aust (Russia) Nikolai Gadetskii (Germany) Holger Harmsen (United Kingdom) JM Littman	Porsche 992 GT3 Cup	+54 Laps	542
35	992-Am	930	(Germany) HRT Performance	(Germany) Stefan Aust (Russia) Nikolai Gadetskii (Germany) Holger Harmsen (United Kingdom) JM Littman	Porsche 4.0 L Flat-6	+54 Laps	542
36	992-Am	979	(Belgium) Speed Lover	(Netherlands) John de Wilde (Belgium) Olivier Dons (Belgium) Jean-Michel Gerome (France) Eric Mouez (Belgium) Brent Verheyen	Porsche 992 GT3 Cup	+55 Laps	541
36	992-Am	979	(Belgium) Speed Lover	(Netherlands) John de Wilde (Belgium) Olivier Dons (Belgium) Jean-Michel Gerome (France) Eric Mouez (Belgium) Brent Verheyen	Porsche 4.0 L Flat-6	+55 Laps	541
37	**TCR**	**159**	**(Thailand) BBR - Billionaire Boys Racing**	**(Thailand) Anusorn Asiralertsiri (Thailand) Kantadhee Kusiri (Thailand) Kantasak Kusiri (Thailand) Pasarit Promsombat (Thailand) Tanart Sathienthirakul**	**CUPRA León TCR**	**+55 Laps**	**541**
37	**TCR**	**159**	**(Thailand) BBR - Billionaire Boys Racing**	**(Thailand) Anusorn Asiralertsiri (Thailand) Kantadhee Kusiri (Thailand) Kantasak Kusiri (Thailand) Pasarit Promsombat (Thailand) Tanart Sathienthirakul**	**Volkswagen 2.0 L I4**	**+55 Laps**	**541**
38	GT3-Pro	30	(Germany) Schubert Motorsport	(Germany) Marcel Lenerz (Germany) Jens Liebhauser (United Kingdom) Jordan Witt (United Kingdom) Nick Yelloly	BMW M4 GT3	+58 Laps	538
38	GT3-Pro	30	(Germany) Schubert Motorsport	(Germany) Marcel Lenerz (Germany) Jens Liebhauser (United Kingdom) Jordan Witt (United Kingdom) Nick Yelloly	BMW S58B30T0 3.0 L Turbo V8	+58 Laps	538
39	GTX	710	(Germany) Leipert Motorsport	(United States) Erik Davis (United States) Gregg Gorski (Germany) Fidel Leib (United States) Gerhard Watzinger (France) Alban Varutti	Lamborghini Huracán Super Trofeo Evo	+59 Laps	537
39	GTX	710	(Germany) Leipert Motorsport	(United States) Erik Davis (United States) Gregg Gorski (Germany) Fidel Leib (United States) Gerhard Watzinger (France) Alban Varutti	Lamborghini 5.2 L V10	+59 Laps	537
40	TCR	188	(Belgium) AC Motorsport	(Switzerland) Miklas Born (Belgium) Mathieu Detry (Switzerland) Yannick Mettler (France) Stéphane Perrin	Audi RS 3 LMS TCR (2017)	+63 Laps	533
40	TCR	188	(Belgium) AC Motorsport	(Switzerland) Miklas Born (Belgium) Mathieu Detry (Switzerland) Yannick Mettler (France) Stéphane Perrin	Volkswagen 2.0 L I4	+63 Laps	533
41	**TCX**	**202**	**(France) Les Deux Arbres**	**(France) Jack Leconte (France) Antoine Lepesqueux (France) Christophe Bouchut (Switzerland) Patrick Zacchia (Switzerland) Steve Zacchia**	**Ligier JS2 R**	**+65 Laps**	**531**
41	**TCX**	**202**	**(France) Les Deux Arbres**	**(France) Jack Leconte (France) Antoine Lepesqueux (France) Christophe Bouchut (Switzerland) Patrick Zacchia (Switzerland) Steve Zacchia**	**Ford 3.7 L V6**	**+65 Laps**	**531**
42	992-Pro	940	(Germany) ID Racing	(Lithuania) Audrius Butkevicius (United States) Vincent Piemonte (Switzerland) Adrian Spescha (Hong Kong) Shaun Thong	Porsche 992 GT3 Cup	+69 Laps	527
42	992-Pro	940	(Germany) ID Racing	(Lithuania) Audrius Butkevicius (United States) Vincent Piemonte (Switzerland) Adrian Spescha (Hong Kong) Shaun Thong	Porsche 4.0 L Flat-6	+69 Laps	527
43	GT4	450	(United States) RHC Jorgensen-Strom by Century	(Netherlands) Danny van Dongen (United Kingdom) Nathan Freke (United States) Daren Jorgensen (United States) Brett Strom	BMW M4 GT4	+70 Laps	526
43	GT4	450	(United States) RHC Jorgensen-Strom by Century	(Netherlands) Danny van Dongen (United Kingdom) Nathan Freke (United States) Daren Jorgensen (United States) Brett Strom	BMW N55 3.0 L Twin-Turbo I6	+70 Laps	526
44	TCX	255	(France) COGEMO/TLRT	(France) André Grammatico (France) Antoine Lacosta (France) Sebastian Morales (France) Philippe Thirion	BMW M2 ClubSport Racing	+73 Laps	523
44	TCX	255	(France) COGEMO/TLRT	(France) André Grammatico (France) Antoine Lacosta (France) Sebastian Morales (France) Philippe Thirion	BMW S55B30T0 3.0 L I6	+73 Laps	523
45	TCX	208	(Germany) Yeeti Racing	(Germany) Phil Hill (Denmark) Thomas Krebs (United States) Hanna Zellers (Italy) Domenico Solombrino	BMW M2 ClubSport Racing	+73 Laps	523
45	TCX	208	(Germany) Yeeti Racing	(Germany) Phil Hill (Denmark) Thomas Krebs (United States) Hanna Zellers (Italy) Domenico Solombrino	BMW S55B30T0 3.0 L I6	+73 Laps	523
46	TCR	112	(Switzerland) Autorama Motorsport by Wolf-Power Racing	(Switzerland) Fabian Danz (Austria) Constantin Kletzer (Switzerland) Jasmin Preisig (Netherlands) Paul Sieljes	Volkswagen Golf GTI TCR	+74 Laps	522
46	TCR	112	(Switzerland) Autorama Motorsport by Wolf-Power Racing	(Switzerland) Fabian Danz (Austria) Constantin Kletzer (Switzerland) Jasmin Preisig (Netherlands) Paul Sieljes	Volkswagen 2.0 L I4	+74 Laps	522
47	TCR	111	(Switzerland) Autorama Motorsport by Wolf-Power Racing	(Lithuania) Vytenis Gulbinas (Germany) Henry Littig (United Kingdom) Alex Morgan (Estonia) Antti Rammo (Brazil) Gustavo Xavier	Volkswagen Golf GTI TCR	+74 Laps	522
47	TCR	111	(Switzerland) Autorama Motorsport by Wolf-Power Racing	(Lithuania) Vytenis Gulbinas (Germany) Henry Littig (United Kingdom) Alex Morgan (Estonia) Antti Rammo (Brazil) Gustavo Xavier	Volkswagen 2.0 L I4	+74 Laps	522
48	TCX	219	(Denmark) Team Sally Racing	(Denmark) Morten Eriksen (Denmark) Niels Nyboe (Denmark) Peter Obel (Denmark) Henrik Thomsen	CUPRA León TCR	+76 Laps	520
48	TCX	219	(Denmark) Team Sally Racing	(Denmark) Morten Eriksen (Denmark) Niels Nyboe (Denmark) Peter Obel (Denmark) Henrik Thomsen	Volkswagen 2.0 L I4	+76 Laps	520
49	TCX	295	(France) CTF Performance	(France) Nicolas Beraud (France) Fabien Delaplace (France) Laurent Pigeut (France) Gilles Poret	Ligier JS2 R	+81 Laps	515
49	TCX	295	(France) CTF Performance	(France) Nicolas Beraud (France) Fabien Delaplace (France) Laurent Pigeut (France) Gilles Poret	Ford 3.7 L V6	+81 Laps	515
50	992-Am	924	(Germany) Huber Racing	(Russia) Evgeny Kireev (Russia) Merabi Mekvabishvili (Germany) Hendrik Still (Germany) Wolfgang Triller	Porsche 992 GT3 Cup	+86 Laps	510
50	992-Am	924	(Germany) Huber Racing	(Russia) Evgeny Kireev (Russia) Merabi Mekvabishvili (Germany) Hendrik Still (Germany) Wolfgang Triller	Porsche 4.0 L Flat-6	+86 Laps	510
51	TCX	200	(Germany) Schubert Motorsport	(Germany) Torsten Schubert (Germany) Michael von Zabiensky (Germany) Stefan von Zabiensky	BMW M2 ClubSport Racing	+87 Laps	509
51	TCX	200	(Germany) Schubert Motorsport	(Germany) Torsten Schubert (Germany) Michael von Zabiensky (Germany) Stefan von Zabiensky	BMW S55B30T0 3.0 L I6	+87 Laps	509
52	GT4	429	(United Kingdom) Century	(Russia) Alex Bukhanstov (United Kingdom) Andrew Gordon-Colebrooke (United Kingdom) George King (United Kingdom) James Winslow	BMW M4 GT4	+88 Laps	508
52	GT4	429	(United Kingdom) Century	(Russia) Alex Bukhanstov (United Kingdom) Andrew Gordon-Colebrooke (United Kingdom) George King (United Kingdom) James Winslow	BMW N55 3.0 L Twin-Turbo I6	+88 Laps	508
53	GT4	451	(Germany) Team Avia Sorg Rennsport	(Germany) Stefan Beyer (Germany) Stephan Epp (Germany) Olaf Mayer (Denmark) Michael Nielsen (Germany) Björn Simon	BMW M4 GT4	+100 Laps	496
53	GT4	451	(Germany) Team Avia Sorg Rennsport	(Germany) Stefan Beyer (Germany) Stephan Epp (Germany) Olaf Mayer (Denmark) Michael Nielsen (Germany) Björn Simon	BMW N55 3.0 L Twin-Turbo I6	+100 Laps	496
54	TCR	102	(Denmark) Holmgaard Motorsport	(United Kingdom) Sam Neary (Denmark) Jonas Holmgaard (Denmark) Magnus Holmgaard (Denmark) Thomas Sørensen (United Kingdom) Andie Stokoe	Volkswagen Golf GTI TCR	+100 Laps	496
54	TCR	102	(Denmark) Holmgaard Motorsport	(United Kingdom) Sam Neary (Denmark) Jonas Holmgaard (Denmark) Magnus Holmgaard (Denmark) Thomas Sørensen (United Kingdom) Andie Stokoe	Volkswagen 2.0 L I4	+100 Laps	496
55	TCX	222	(France) Lamera GT	(France) Pierre Couasnon (France) Franck Dezoteux (France) Grégory Fargier (France) Wilfried Merafina	Lamera GT	+100 Laps	496
55	TCX	222	(France) Lamera GT	(France) Pierre Couasnon (France) Franck Dezoteux (France) Grégory Fargier (France) Wilfried Merafina	Volvo 2.5 L I5	+100 Laps	496
56	991	955	(Italy) Willi Motorsport by Ebimotors	(Italy) Fabrizio Broggi (Italy) Sabino de Castro (Romania) Sergiu Nicolae	Porsche 991 GT3 Cup II	+101 Laps	495
56	991	955	(Italy) Willi Motorsport by Ebimotors	(Italy) Fabrizio Broggi (Italy) Sabino de Castro (Romania) Sergiu Nicolae	Porsche 4.0 L Flat-6	+101 Laps	495
57	992-Pro	962	(Switzerland) Fach Auto Tech	(Brazil) Átila Abreu (Brazil) Georgios Frangulis (Brazil) Eduardo Menossi (Brazil) Leonardo Sanchez Secundino (Brazil) Rouman Zimekiewicz	Porsche 992 GT3 Cup	+103 Laps	493
57	992-Pro	962	(Switzerland) Fach Auto Tech	(Brazil) Átila Abreu (Brazil) Georgios Frangulis (Brazil) Eduardo Menossi (Brazil) Leonardo Sanchez Secundino (Brazil) Rouman Zimekiewicz	Porsche 4.0 L Flat-6	+103 Laps	493
58	GT3-Am	95	(United Kingdom) Duel Racing with TF Sport	(Oman) Ahmad Al Harthy (United Arab Emirates) Nabil Moutran (United Arab Emirates) Ramzi Moutran (United Arab Emirates) Sami Moutran	Aston Martin Vantage AMR GT3	+108 Laps	488
58	GT3-Am	95	(United Kingdom) Duel Racing with TF Sport	(Oman) Ahmad Al Harthy (United Arab Emirates) Nabil Moutran (United Arab Emirates) Ramzi Moutran (United Arab Emirates) Sami Moutran	Aston Martin 4.0 L Turbo V8	+108 Laps	488
59	TCR	116	(Switzerland) Autorama Motorsport by Wolf-Power Racing	(United Kingdom) Robert Huff (Germany) Markus Menden (Germany) Marlon Menden (United Kingdom) Alex Morgan (Germany) Peter Posavac	Volkswagen Golf GTI TCR	+112 Laps	484
59	TCR	116	(Switzerland) Autorama Motorsport by Wolf-Power Racing	(United Kingdom) Robert Huff (Germany) Markus Menden (Germany) Marlon Menden (United Kingdom) Alex Morgan (Germany) Peter Posavac	Volkswagen 2.0 L I4	+112 Laps	484
60 DNF	GT4	403	(South Korea) AtlasBX Motorsports	(Netherlands) Roelof Bruins (Canada) Steven Cho (South Korea) Jong Kyum Kim (South Korea) Yong Hyeok Yang	Mercedes-AMG GT4	+115 Laps	481
60 DNF	GT4	403	(South Korea) AtlasBX Motorsports	(Netherlands) Roelof Bruins (Canada) Steven Cho (South Korea) Jong Kyum Kim (South Korea) Yong Hyeok Yang	Mercedes-AMG M178 4.0 L V8	+115 Laps	481
61	TCX	222	(Luxembourg) Lamera GT Lux	(France) Sébastien Guignard (France) Mattéo Mérafina (France) Thomas Mérafina (Luxembourg) Tommy Rollinger	Lamera GT	+119 Laps	477
61	TCX	222	(Luxembourg) Lamera GT Lux	(France) Sébastien Guignard (France) Mattéo Mérafina (France) Thomas Mérafina (Luxembourg) Tommy Rollinger	Volvo 2.5 L I5	+119 Laps	477
62	GT4	401	(Germany) PROsport Performance AMR	(Belgium) Guido Dumarey (Belgium) Rodrigue Gillion (Germany) Mike David Ortmann (Germany) Hugo Sasse (Belgium) Nico Verdonck	Aston Martin Vantage AMR GT4	+124 Laps	472
62	GT4	401	(Germany) PROsport Performance AMR	(Belgium) Guido Dumarey (Belgium) Rodrigue Gillion (Germany) Mike David Ortmann (Germany) Hugo Sasse (Belgium) Nico Verdonck	Aston Martin 4.0 L Turbo V8	+124 Laps	472
63	GT4	415	(Denmark) Jönsson consult / eva solo	(Denmark) Claus Bertelsen (Denmark) Henrik Bollerslev (Denmark) Jan Engelbrecht (Denmark) Søren Jönsson	Mercedes-AMG GT4	+115 Laps	481
63	GT4	415	(Denmark) Jönsson consult / eva solo	(Denmark) Claus Bertelsen (Denmark) Henrik Bollerslev (Denmark) Jan Engelbrecht (Denmark) Søren Jönsson	Mercedes-AMG M178 4.0 L V8	+115 Laps	481
64 DNF	GT3-Pro	77	(United Kingdom) Barwell Motorsport	(Switzerland) Adrian Amstutz (Italy) Mirko Bortolotti (Netherlands) Rik Breukers (Switzerland) Rolf Ineichen	Lamborghini Huracán GT3 Evo	+131 Laps	465
64 DNF	GT3-Pro	77	(United Kingdom) Barwell Motorsport	(Switzerland) Adrian Amstutz (Italy) Mirko Bortolotti (Netherlands) Rik Breukers (Switzerland) Rolf Ineichen	Lamborghini 5.2 L V10	+131 Laps	465
65 DNF	992-Am	931	(Germany) HRT Performance	(Saudi Arabia) Saeed Al Mour (France) Michael Blanchemain (Germany) Lars Dahmann (France) Cyril Saleilles (Australia) Marcel Zalloua	Porsche 992 GT3 Cup	+132 Laps	464
65 DNF	992-Am	931	(Germany) HRT Performance	(Saudi Arabia) Saeed Al Mour (France) Michael Blanchemain (Germany) Lars Dahmann (France) Cyril Saleilles (Australia) Marcel Zalloua	Porsche 4.0 L Flat-6	+132 Laps	464
66	991	903	(Belgium) Red Ant Racing	(Belgium) Pieter Ooms (Belgium) Glenn van Parijs (Belgium) Ayrton Redant (Belgium) Yannick Redant	Porsche 991 GT3 Cup II	+139 Laps	457
66	991	903	(Belgium) Red Ant Racing	(Belgium) Pieter Ooms (Belgium) Glenn van Parijs (Belgium) Ayrton Redant (Belgium) Yannick Redant	Porsche 4.0 L Flat-6	+139 Laps	457
67	TCX	207	(France) Orhes Racing	(France) Micael Costa (France) Franck Dallavalle (France) José Fernandes (France) Benjamin Riviere (France) Rocco Spano	Ligier JS2 R	+174 Laps	422
67	TCX	207	(France) Orhes Racing	(France) Micael Costa (France) Franck Dallavalle (France) José Fernandes (France) Benjamin Riviere (France) Rocco Spano	Ford 3.7 L V6	+174 Laps	422
68	GT4	411	(Germany) Heide Motorsport	(United States) Cabell Fisher (Germany) Sophie Hofmann (Germany) Ulrich Kainzinger (Germany) Daniel Karl (Germany) Heinz Schmersal	Audi R8 LMS GT4 Evo	+210 Laps	386
68	GT4	411	(Germany) Heide Motorsport	(United States) Cabell Fisher (Germany) Sophie Hofmann (Germany) Ulrich Kainzinger (Germany) Daniel Karl (Germany) Heinz Schmersal	Audi 5.2 L V10	+210 Laps	386
69	TCR	103	(Denmark) Team Sally Racing	(United Arab Emirates) Mohammed Al Owais (Germany) Christian Ladurner (Germany) Marco Santamaria (Jordan) Nadir Zuhour	CUPRA León TCR	+238 Laps	358
69	TCR	103	(Denmark) Team Sally Racing	(United Arab Emirates) Mohammed Al Owais (Germany) Christian Ladurner (Germany) Marco Santamaria (Jordan) Nadir Zuhour	Volkswagen 2.0 L I4	+238 Laps	358
70	GTX	701	(France) Vortex V8	(France) Lionel Amrouche (France) Philippe Bonnel (France) Cyril Calmon (France) Sebastien Lajoux	Vortex 1.0 GTX	+269 Laps	327
70	GTX	701	(France) Vortex V8	(France) Lionel Amrouche (France) Philippe Bonnel (France) Cyril Calmon (France) Sebastien Lajoux	Chevrolet 6.2 L V8	+269 Laps	327
71	TCX	278	(United Kingdom) CWS Engineering	(France) Alain Bucher (United Kingdom) Finlay Hutchinson (United States) Matthew Ibrahim (United Kingdom) Darren Leung (United Kingdom) Bobby Thompson	Ginetta G55 Supercup	+302 Laps	294
71	TCX	278	(United Kingdom) CWS Engineering	(France) Alain Bucher (United Kingdom) Finlay Hutchinson (United States) Matthew Ibrahim (United Kingdom) Darren Leung (United Kingdom) Bobby Thompson	Ford Cyclone 3.7 L V6	+302 Laps	294
NC	GT4	478	(United Kingdom) CWS Engineering	(United Kingdom) James Jakes (United Kingdom) Mike Simpson (United Kingdom) Lawrence Tomlinson (United Kingdom) Colin White	Ginetta G56 GT4	Not Classified	282
NC	GT4	478	(United Kingdom) CWS Engineering	(United Kingdom) James Jakes (United Kingdom) Mike Simpson (United Kingdom) Lawrence Tomlinson (United Kingdom) Colin White	GM LS3 6.2 L V8	Not Classified	282
DNF	992-Am	961	(Switzerland) Fach Auto Tech	(Switzerland) Alexander Fach (Switzerland) Dominik Fischli (Switzerland) Peter Hegglin (Switzerland) Jan Klingelnberg (Switzerland) Marcel Wagner	Porsche 992 GT3 Cup	Retired	249
DNF	992-Am	961	(Switzerland) Fach Auto Tech	(Switzerland) Alexander Fach (Switzerland) Dominik Fischli (Switzerland) Peter Hegglin (Switzerland) Jan Klingelnberg (Switzerland) Marcel Wagner	Porsche 4.0 L Flat-6	Retired	249
DNF	GT3-Pro	67	(Italy) Dinamic Motorsport	(Italy) Matteo Cairoli (Switzerland) Mauro Calamia (Switzerland) Stefano Monaco (Italy) Roberto Pampanini	Porsche 911 GT3 R	Crash	177
DNF	GT3-Pro	67	(Italy) Dinamic Motorsport	(Italy) Matteo Cairoli (Switzerland) Mauro Calamia (Switzerland) Stefano Monaco (Italy) Roberto Pampanini	Porsche 4.0 L Flat-6	Crash	177
DNF	GTX	714	(Austria) Razoon - More than Racing	(Austria) Daniel Drexel (Austria) Andreas Höfler (Austria) Dominik Olbert (Austria) Kevin Raith (Austria) Robert Schiftner	KTM X-Bow GT2 Concept	Crash	165
DNF	GTX	714	(Austria) Razoon - More than Racing	(Austria) Daniel Drexel (Austria) Andreas Höfler (Austria) Dominik Olbert (Austria) Kevin Raith (Austria) Robert Schiftner	Porsche 4.0 L Flat-6	Crash	165
DNF	GT4	451	(Germany) Team Avia Sorg Rennsport	(United Arab Emirates) Ahmed Al Melaihi (Ukraine) Dmytro Ryzhak (Mexico) Francisco Sapien (Mexico) Benito Tagle (Germany) Hans Joachim Theiss	BMW M4 GT4	Accident	153
DNF	GT4	451	(Germany) Team Avia Sorg Rennsport	(United Arab Emirates) Ahmed Al Melaihi (Ukraine) Dmytro Ryzhak (Mexico) Francisco Sapien (Mexico) Benito Tagle (Germany) Hans Joachim Theiss	BMW N55 3.0 L Twin-Turbo I6	Accident	153
DNF	GT3-Pro	54	(Italy) Dinamic Motorsport	(Austria) Klaus Bachler (Germany) Marvin Dienst (Russia) Stanislav Minsky (Germany) Marco Seefried (Germany) Murad Sultanov	Porsche 911 GT3 R	Crash	115
DNF	GT3-Pro	54	(Italy) Dinamic Motorsport	(Austria) Klaus Bachler (Germany) Marvin Dienst (Russia) Stanislav Minsky (Germany) Marco Seefried (Germany) Murad Sultanov	Porsche 4.0 L Flat-6	Crash	115
DNF	992-Am	923	(Germany) Huber Racing	(Italy) Enrico Fulgenzi (Germany) Matthias Hoffsümmer (Germany) Laurin Heinrich (Luxembourg) Gabriel Rindone	Porsche 992 GT3 Cup	Retired	77
DNF	992-Am	923	(Germany) Huber Racing	(Italy) Enrico Fulgenzi (Germany) Matthias Hoffsümmer (Germany) Laurin Heinrich (Luxembourg) Gabriel Rindone	Porsche 4.0 L Flat-6	Retired	77
NC	TCR	133	(Hungary) Zengő Motorsport	(Hungary) Tamás Horváth (Hungary) Gábor Kismarty-Lechner (Hungary) Ga'l Szabolcs (Hungary) Csaba Tóth (Hungary) Zoltan Zengö	CUPRA León TCR	Not Classified	69
NC	TCR	133	(Hungary) Zengő Motorsport	(Hungary) Tamás Horváth (Hungary) Gábor Kismarty-Lechner (Hungary) Ga'l Szabolcs (Hungary) Csaba Tóth (Hungary) Zoltan Zengö	Volkswagen 2.0 L I4	Not Classified	69
DNS	TCX	295	(France) CTF Performance	(France) Nicolas Beraud (France) Fabien Delaplace (France) Laurent Pigeut (France) Gilles Poret	Ligier JS2 R	Did Not Start	
DNS	TCX	295	(France) CTF Performance	(France) Nicolas Beraud (France) Fabien Delaplace (France) Laurent Pigeut (France) Gilles Poret	Ford 3.7 L V6	Did Not Start	

== Footnotes ==
24H Series
Previous race: none	2022 season	Next race: 12 Hours of Mugello

24H TCE Series
Previous race: none	2022 season	Next race: 12 Hours of Mugello
