= Artur Goroyan =

- Born: 25 April 1988 (age 38); Ninotsminda, Georgian SSR, Soviet Union
- Occupation: Racing driver
- Spouse: Inga Goroyan
- Nationality: (Armenia) Armenian

Nürburgring Langstrecken-Serie career
- Current team: Goroyan RT by Car Collection
- Categorisation: FIA Bronze
- Former teams: Team Mathol Racing, LMS Engineering, Sharky Racing, Car Collection Motorsport

Championship titles
- 2025: Nürburgring Langstrecken-Serie TCR class

Artur Goroyan (Արթուր Գորոյան; born 25 April 1988) is an Armenian racing driver who has represented Armenia in international endurance racing.

He has competed in the Nürburgring Endurance Series, the 24 Hours of Nürburgring, the 24H Series and the 6 Hours of Abu Dhabi. He won the TCR class of the Nürburgring Langstrecken-Serie in 2025 and is the founder of Goroyan RT.

Goroyan is associated with the development of Armenian representation in international motorsport. While several racing drivers of Armenian heritage had competed internationally under other national sporting authorities, Goroyan became the first driver to compete internationally with an Armenian Fédération Internationale de l'Automobile (FIA) international competition licence issued through the Armenian Automobile Federation (FAA). The licence was reported as INT ARM 001, making him the first ever driver to formally represent Armenia under the Armenian national licensing system in international motorsport. The milestone has been linked to the FAA's development of Armenia's official national motorsport representation within the FIA framework.

== Racing career ==
=== Karting and early career ===
Goroyan started karting in 2008 at Forza Karting Academy under Russian racing driver Sergey Baldin. He later competed in the SWS Karting Championship 24 Hours of Dubai, in events that included international drivers such as Fernando Alonso.

=== Nürburgring endurance racing ===
Goroyan later moved into endurance racing at the Nürburgring. In 2016, 168.am reported that he participated in the SP3T class at the Nürburgring with a B international licence and appeared with the ARM 001 licence in qualification races. He subsequently competed in the 24 Hours of Nürburgring and the Nürburgring Endurance Series with teams including Team Mathol Racing, LMS Engineering, MSC Sinzig, Sharky Racing and Car Collection Motorsport.

In 2023, Goroyan competed in the TCR class at the 6 Hours of Abu Dhabi with Sharky Racing and won the class together with Roman Mavlanov.

=== Goroyan RT ===
Goroyan later founded Goroyan RT, an independent racing team active in endurance racing. The team has competed in cooperation with Sharky Racing and Car Collection Motorsport in categories including TCR, SP3T and SP9 Pro-Am.

In 2025, Goroyan won the TCR class of the Nürburgring Langstrecken-Serie with Goroyan RT by Sharky Racing. Audi Sport listed Danny Brink and Artur Goroyan among the winners of the TCR class in the 2025 NLS class winners trophy.

For 2026, Goroyan RT by Car Collection entered the 24 Hours of Nürburgring in the SP9 Pro-Am class with a Porsche 911 GT3 R. The entry included Goroyan, Oleg Kvitka, Nathanaël Berthon and Alex Fontana.

== Armenian motorsport development ==
Goroyan has been linked to the development of Armenian motorsport through the Armenian Automobile Federation (FAA), Armenia's member federation of the Fédération Internationale de l'Automobile. The FAA sport programme has referred to a karting academy developed by Goroyan and FAA coaches as part of its motorsport development activities.

In May 2026, Goroyan joined the strategic advisory structure of the Armenian Automobile Federation, together with French-Armenian endurance racing driver Nicolas Minassian and French racing driver Nicolas Prost, supporting the federation's international motorsport development agenda.

== Outside motorsport ==
Outside racing, Goroyan is involved in business and philanthropy. The VIVA Foundation lists him as an ambassador of the foundation and as a co-founder of the management company GInvest. In 2026, VIVA also described him as the initiator of the foundation's Pativ charitable account supporting medical outreach programmes in Armenia.

== Personal life ==
Goroyan is married to Inga Goroyan.

== Racing record ==
=== Racing career summary ===
Season	Series	Team	Races	Wins	Poles	Podiums	Position
2008–2012	SWS Karting Championship 24 Hours of Dubai	Various					
2014	24 Hours of Nürburgring - Cup1	Team Mathol Racing e.V.	1	0	0	0	8th
2015	24 Hours of Nürburgring - SP3T	Team Mathol Racing e.V.	1	0	0	0	5th
2015	VLN Series - SP3T	Fanclub Mathol Racing e.V.	1	0	0	0	N/A
2016	24 Hours of Nürburgring - SP3T	LMS Engineering	1	0	1	0	4th
2018	VLN Series - SP3T	MSC Sinzig e.V. im ADAC	1	0	0	0	N/A
2018	24 Hours of Nürburgring - SP3T	MSC Sinzig	1	0	0	0	NC
2021	24 Hours of Nürburgring - SP3T	MSC Sinzig e.V. im ADAC	1	0	0	0	5th
2022	24 Hours of Nürburgring - SP3T	MSC Sinzig e.V. im ADAC	1	0	0	0	4th
2022	Dubai 24 Hour - GT3	Car Collection Motorsport	1	0	0	0	
2022–23	Middle East Trophy - TCR	Sharky Racing					
2023	24 Hours of Nürburgring - TCR	Sharky Racing by MSC Sinzig	1	0	0	0	5th
2023–24	Middle East Trophy - GT3	Goroyan RT by Car Collection Motorsport					
2024	Nürburgring Langstrecken-Serie - SP3T	MSC Sinzig e.V. im ADAC					
2024	24 Hours of Nürburgring - SP3T	Sharky Racing by MSC Sinzig e.V. im ADAC					
2025	Nürburgring Langstrecken-Serie - TCR	Goroyan RT by Sharky Racing	10	5		9	1st
2025	Nürburgring Langstrecken-Serie - SP9	Car Collection Motorsport	2	0	0	2	
2025	24 Hours of Nürburgring - TCR	Goroyan RT by Sharky Racing	1	0	0	1	3rd
2025-26	24H Series Middle East - GT3	Origine Motorsport					
2026	24 Hours of Nürburgring - SP9	Goroyan RT by Car Collection	1	0	0		

== See also ==
- Armenian Automobile Federation
- Motorsport in Armenia
- Nürburgring Endurance Series
- 24 Hours of Nürburgring
- 24H Series
