= Jaap van Lagen =

Dutch racing driver

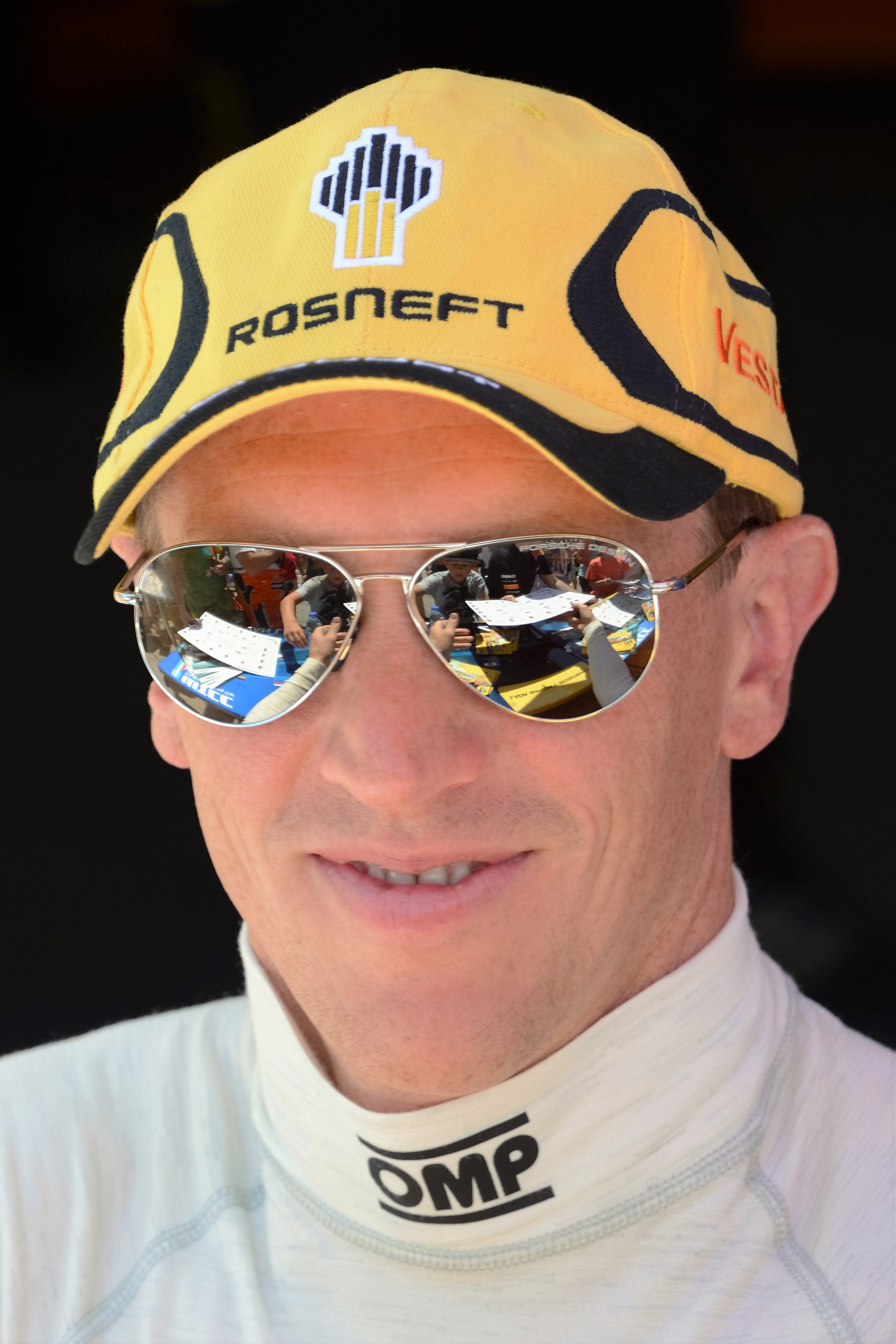
- van Lagen in 2015
- Nationality: Dutch
- Born: 22 December 1976 (age 49) Ede (Netherlands)
- Categorisation: FIA Gold

Previous series
- 2012 2011 2010 2010 2008–09 2005–07 2006 2004 2003 2000–02 1999: Blancpain Endurance Series; American Le Mans Series; Superleague Formula; BTCS; WTCC; Formula Renault 3.5 Series; Eurocup Mégane Trophy; Eurocup Formula Renault V6; Formula VW Germany; Formula Ford 1800 Benelux; Citroën Saxo Cup Netherlands

Championship titles
- 2012 2011 2006 2003 2002–01: Dutch Winter Endurance Series; Dutch Supercar Challenge SS1; Eurocup Mégane Trophy; Formula VW Germany; Formula Ford 1800 Benelux

Jaap van Lagen (born 22 December 1976 in Ede) is a Dutch racing driver who currently competes in Porsche Supercup for Proton Huber Competition and in the Porsche Carrera Cup Benelux for Team RaceArt. He is a former competitor in the Formula Renault 3.5 Series and a former Eurocup Megane Trophy champion. He has also raced in the World Touring Car Championship.

Jaap van Lagen won the Porsche Cup, an annual award presented by Porsche AG to recognize the world's most successful privateer racing driver competing with Porsche machinery in a customer racing team, in 2014.

== Racing career ==
=== World Touring Car Championship ===
In 2008, van Lagen raced in the World Touring Car Championship for Russian Bears Motorsport in a Lada 110. For the 2009 WTCC season, he returned with full manufacturer backing from Lada. He never scored a single point. After his return to the class and Lada in 2015, he scored 16 points.

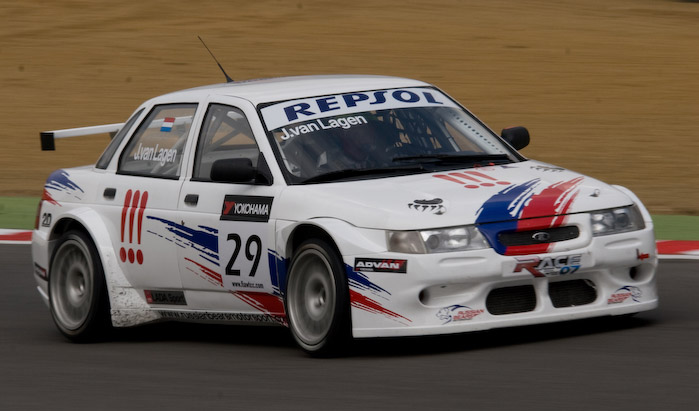
Van Lagen driving the Lada 110 WTCC car at Brands Hatch in 2008.

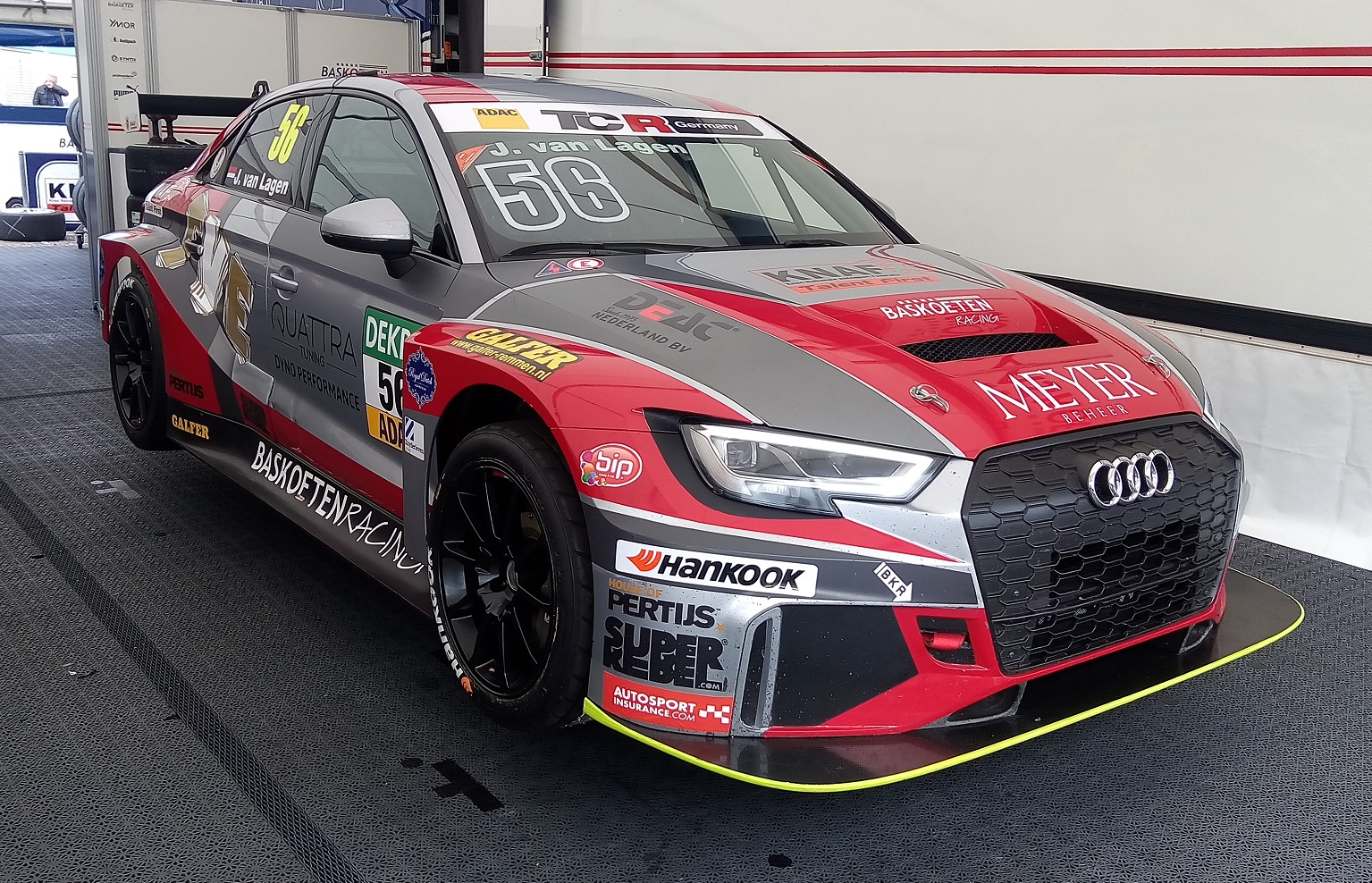
Van Lagen's Audi RS3 TCR in 2017, where he made a one-off entry in ADAC TCR Germany.

== Racing record ==
=== Career summary ===
Season	Series	Team	Races	Wins	Poles	F.Laps	Podiums	Points	Position
1999	Radio 538 Saxo Cup	Match Racing	8	3	2	3	4	107	**2nd**
2000	Formula Ford Festival	Geva Racing	1	0	0	0	0	0	14th
2000	Formula Ford 1800 Benelux	Geva Racing	10	0	1	2	1	46	9th
2000	Formula Ford 1800 Netherlands	Geva Racing	?	?	?	?	?	48	10th
2001	Formula Ford Festival	Van Amersfoort Racing	1	0	0	0	0	0	18th
2001	Formula Ford 1800 Benelux	Van Amersfoort Racing	11	1	1	4	8	140	**1st**
2002	Formula Ford Festival	MP Motorsport	1	0	0	0	1	0	**3rd**
2002	Formula Ford 1800 Benelux	MP Motorsport	10	7	6	3	8	143	**1st**
2002	Formula Ford 1800 Netherlands	MP Motorsport	?	?	?	?	?	102	**1st**
2002	German Formula Three Championship	Van Amersfoort Racing	2	0	0	0	0	0	NC
2002	Masters of Formula 3	Van Amersfoort Racing	1	0	0	0	0	0	27th
2003	Formula Volkswagen Germany	WT Motorsport	14	8	9	7	11	336	**1st**
2004	Formula Renault V6 Eurocup	Interwetten Racing	19	1	1	0	2	145	7th
2004–05	Dutch Winter Endurance Series	?	2	0	0	0	0	22	44th
2005	Formula Renault 3.5 Series	KTR	16	0	0	1	1	49	9th
2005	ADAC Volkswagen Polo Cup	ADAC Motorsport	1	1	0	0	1	0	NC
2005–06	Dutch Winter Endurance Series	?	3	1	1	0	2	145	7th
2006	Formula Renault 3.5 Series	Comtec Racing	5	0	0	0	0	8	28th
2006	Eurocup Mégane Trophy	Equipe Verschuur	14	4	6	7	8	151	**1st**
2006	Volkswagen Endurance Cup Netherlands	Duits Racing	1	0	?	?	0	199	6th
2007	Formula Renault 3.5 Series	Red Devil Team Comtec	2	0	0	0	0	0	28th
2007	Formula Renault 3.5 Series	Eurointernational	2	0	0	0	0	0	28th
2007	Porsche Supercup	Bleekemolen Race Planet	7	0	0	0	0	40	14th
2007	BRL V6	?	2	0	0	0	0	11	24th
2007	Dutch Winter Endurance Series	?	2	1	?	?	1	28	30th
2007	BMW 120d Endurance Series	?	1	?	?	?	?	?	?
2008	24H Series - SP1	Equipe Verschuur	1	0	1	?	1	18	**3rd**
2008	24H Series - SP2	Audi CR-8 Team	2	0	0	1	0	0	5th
2008	Porsche Supercup	DAMAC Kadach Racing	11	1	1	3	4	94	7th
2008	World Touring Car Championship	Russian Bears Motorsport	19	0	0	0	0	0	NC
2008	Volkswagen Endurance Cup Netherlands	Duits Racing	1	0	0	0	0	253	22nd
2009	World Touring Car Championship	LADA Sport	21	0	0	0	0	0	NC
2009	Dunlop Sportsmaxx Clio Cup	Match Racing	?	?	?	?	?	5	26th
2010	Porsche Supercup	Bleekemolen Harders Plaza Racing	8	0	0	1	2	98	4th
2010	Superleague Formula	GD Bordeaux	2	0	0	0	0	372	11th
2010	Argos Supreme Toerwagen Diesel Cup	Team Bleekemolen	2	0	0	1	2	35	33rd
2010	Porsche Carrera Cup Germany	Konrad Motorsport	1	0	0	0	1	0	NC
2010	Belgian Touring Car Series - T2	Pollys Racing	1	1	0	0	1	40	15th
2010	Dutch Supercar Challenge - Supersport 1	Bas Koeten Racing	16	6	7	10	7	210	**2nd**
2011	Dutch Winter Endurance Series	?	2	0	0	0	1	?	?
2011	Porsche Carrera World Cup	Land Motorsport	1	0	0	0	0	0	11th
2011	Porsche Carrera Cup Germany	Land Motorsport	9	1	1	2	2	86	6th
2011	American Le Mans Series - GTC	Green Hornet/Black Swan Racing	1	0	1	1	0	13	26th
2011	Dutch Supercar Challenge - Supersport 1	FE Racing	18	6	6	6	9	249	**1st**
2011	24 Hours of Le Mans - LMGTE Pro	Prospeed Competition	1	0	0	0	0	N/A	8th
2011	24 Hours of Barcelona	Bovi Motorsport	1	0	0	0	1	N/A	**2nd**
2012	Dutch Winter Endurance Series	Mad & Daring	4	2	2	3	3	56	1st
2012	Dutch Winter Endurance Series	FE Racing	4	2	2	3	3	56	1st
2012	Porsche Carrera Cup Germany	FE Racing by Land - Motorsport	17	0	0	0	2	158	6th
2012	Porsche Supercup	FE Racing by Land - Motorsport	1	0	0	1	1	0	NC
2012	24 Hours of Barcelona - 997	ARC Bratislava	1	1	0	1	1	N/A	**1st**
2012	Supercar Challenge - Super GT	FE Racing	4	0	0	1	1	0	NC
2012	Supercar Challenge - GT	FE Racing	5	1	1	2	2	76	7th
2012	VLN Series	?	?	?	?	?	?	5.5	719th
2012	Blancpain Endurance Series - Pro-Am	Race Art	2	0	0	0	0	1	38th
2013	Porsche Carrera Cup Germany	FE Racing by Land - Motorsport	17	2	2	1	3	159	7th
2013	VLN Series	Timbuli Racing	1	?	?	?	1	?	?
2013	Porsche Supercup	Lechner Racing	1	0	0	0	0	0	NC
2013	Supercar Challenge - Super GT	Lammertink Racing	2	0	0	0	0	?	?
2014	ADAC GT Masters	GW IT Racing Team Schütz Motorsport	16	2	0	1	7	188	**2nd**
2014	Porsche Carrera Cup Germany	Aust Motorsport	2	0	0	1	1	50	15th
2014	Porsche Carrera Cup Germany	TECE MRS-Racing	6	0	0	1	1	50	15th
2014	Porsche Carrera Cup Germany	ZaWotec Racing	2	0	0	0	0	50	15th
2014	United SportsCar Championship - GTD	Park Place Motorsports	1	0	0	0	0	1	125th
2014	Blancpain GT Series - Pro	Tonino Team Herberth	2	0	0	0	1	16	16th
2014	Porsche Supercup	MOMO-Megatron	2	0	0	0	0	7	20th
2015	24H Series - 997	Lechner Racing Middle East							
2015	Dubai 24 Hour - 997	Lechner Racing Middle East	1	0	0	0	1	N/A	**3rd**
2015	Dutch Winter Endurance Series	?	?	?	?	?	?	7	68th
2015	24 Hours of Nürburgring - SP9	Black Falcon	1	0	0	0	0	?	5th
2015	Porsche Carrera Cup Germany	Lechner Racing Middle East	4	0	0	0	0	45	15th
2015	Porsche Carrera Cup Germany	KÜS Team 75 Bernhard	2	0	0	0	0	45	15th
2015	Porsche Carrera Cup Germany	Aust Motorsport	2	0	0	0	0	45	15th
2015	World Touring Car Championship	Lada Sport Rosneft	10	0	0	0	0	16	15th
2015	Porsche Supercup	Fach Auto Tech	1	1	1	0	1	29	15th
2015	Porsche Supercup	Land Motorsport	2	0	0	0	0	29	15th
2015	Porsche Supercup	MOMO Megatron Team PARTRAX	2	0	0	0	0	29	15th
2015	ADAC GT Masters	Reiter Engineering	2	0	0	0	0	0	NC
2016	ADAC GT Masters	HB Racing WDS Bau	14	0	0	?	1	32	23rd
2016	24H Series - 991	Lechner Racing Middle East	1	1	0	0	1	?	?
2016	24 Hours of Nürburgring - SP9	Walkenhorst Motorsport	1	0	0	0	0	0	DNF
2016	Porsche Supercup	MOMO-Megatron Team Partrax	1	0	0	0	0	6	20th
2017	24H Series - SP2	Bovi Motorsport	1	1	1	1	1	29	?
2017	Blancpain GT Series Endurance Cup	Walkenhorst Motorsport	1	0	0	0	0	0	NC
2017	Blancpain GT Series Endurance Cup	Attempto Racing	1	0	0	0	0	0	NC
2017	TCR International Series	Leopard Racing Team WRT	4	0	0	0	0	8	29th
2017	TCR BeNeLux Touring Car Championship	Certainty Racing Team	3	2	1	2	3	67	19th
2017	ADAC TCR Germany Touring Car Championship	Certainty Racing Team	2	0	0	0	0	10	36th
2017	24 Hours of Nürburgring - SP9 LG	Walkenhorst Motorsport	1	?	?	?	1	N/A	**2nd**
2017	24 Hours of Nürburgring - SP9	Walkenhorst Motorsport	1	?	?	?	0	N/A	DNF
2017	Porsche Supercup	MOMO-Megatron Team Partrax	1	0	0	0	0	14	21st
2017	Intercontinental GT Challenge	Attempto Racing	1	0	0	0	0	0	NC
2018	Porsche Supercup	Fach Auto Tech	10	0	0	0	2	89	8th
2018	TCR Europe Touring Car Series	Leopard Lukoil Team WRT	2	0	1	1	2	38	13th
2018	TCR BeNeLux Touring Car Championship	Leopard Lukoil Team WRT	2	2	1	1	2	55	9th
2018	Porsche Carrera Cup Germany	FÖRCH Racing	10	2	1	0	6	0	NC
2018	Supercar Challenge - GT	BODA Racing	2	0	1	0	0	17	21st
2019	24H GT Series - A6	MP Motorsport							
2019	Dubai 24 Hour - A6-Am	MP Motorsport	1	0	0	0	0	0	DNF
2019	Porsche Supercup	martinet by Alméras	10	0	0	0	0	N/A	10th
2019	Porsche Carrera Cup Germany	FÖRCH Racing	15	0	0	0	2	141.5	5th
2019	TCR Spa 500	NKPP Racing by Bas Koeten Racing	1	0	1	0	0	N/A	DNF
2020	24H GT Series - Continents Series - GT3	MP Motorsport	1	1	0	0	0	29	8th
2020	24H GT Series - Europe Series - GT3	MP Motorsport	1	0	1	0	0	5	11th
2020	Dutch Winter Endurance Series	JW Raceservice	1	1	0	0	1	12	17th
2020	Porsche Supercup	Fach Auto Tech	8	0	0	0	0	43	11th
2020	Supercar Challenge - GT	BODA Racing	0	0	0	0	0	0	NC
2021	24H GT Series - GT3	MP Motorsport							
2021	Dubai 24 Hour - GT3-Am	MP Motorsport	1	0	0	0	0	?	4th
2021	GT Cup Open Europe - Pro-Am	Q1 by EMG Motorsport	2	1	1	1	1	7	13th
2021	Porsche Carrera Cup Germany	HRT Motorsport	2	0	0	1	0	18	20th
2021	Clio Cup Europe	Chefo Sport	2	0	1	0	1	69	36th
2021	Porsche Supercup	Dinamic Motorsport	1	0	0	0	0	0	NC
2021	Belcar Endurance Championship - GT	Q1 Trackracing	1	0	0	0	1	?	?
2022	24H GT Series - GT3	MP Motorsport							
2022	Dubai 24 Hour - GT3-Pro Am	MP Motorsport	1	1	?	?	1	?	**1st**
2022	Porsche Supercup	Martinet by Alméras	8	0	0	0	0	35	11th
2023	Dubai 24 Hour - GT3-Pro Am	MP Motorsport	1	0	?	?	0	0	DNF
2023	Porsche Supercup	Dinamic GT	8	0	0	0	0	44	11th
2024	Porsche Supercup	Dinamic Motorsport	8	0	0	0	1	60	9th
2025	Porsche Supercup	Proton Huber Competition	8	0	0	0	0	28	14th
2025	Middle East Trophy - GT3	MP Motorsport							
2025	Porsche Carrera Cup Benelux	Team RaceArt	12	4	2	4	10	234	**1st**
2026	Porsche Carrera Cup France	Martinet by Alméras							
2026	Porsche Supercup	Martinet by Alméras	8	0	1	0	2	63	9th
2026	Porsche Carrera Cup Benelux	Team RaceArt	12	4	4	5	9	213	**2nd**
2026	Porsche Carrera Cup Asia	Absolute Racing	2	0	0	0	1	0	NC†

^{*} Season still in progress.

=== Complete Formula Renault 3.5 Series results ===
(key) (Races in bold indicate pole position) (Races in italics indicate fastest lap)

Year	Entrant	1	2	3	4	5	6	7	8	9	10	11	12	13	14	15	16	17	DC	Points
2005	KTR	ZOL; 1; 18	ZOL; 2; 10	MON; 1; 2	VAL; 1; 14	VAL; 2 Ret	LMS; 1 DNS	LMS; 2 NC	BIL; 1; 13	BIL; 2 Ret	OSC; 1; 7	OSC; 2; 4	DON; 1; 4	DON; 2 Ret	EST; 1; 19	EST; 2; 4	MNZ; 1; 9	MNZ; 2; 6	9th	49
2006	Comtec Racing	ZOL; 1	ZOL; 2	MON; 1 Ret	IST; 1 Ret	IST; 2; 9	MIS; 1	MIS; 2	SPA; 1; 5	SPA; 2 Ret	NÜR; 1	NÜR; 2	DON; 1	DON; 2	LMS; 1	LMS; 2	CAT; 1	CAT; 2	28th	8
2007	Red Devil Team Comtec	MNZ; 1; 11	MNZ; 2; 11	NÜR; 1	NÜR; 2	MON; 1													28th	0
2007	Eurointernational						HUN; 1 Ret	HUN; 2 Ret	SPA; 1 DNS	SPA; 2 DNS	DON; 1	DON; 2	MAG; 1	MAG; 2	EST; 1	EST; 2	CAT; 1	CAT; 2	28th	0

=== Complete World Touring Car Championship results ===
(key) (Races in bold indicate pole position) (Races in italics indicate fastest lap)

Year	Team	Car	1	2	3	4	5	6	7	8	9	10	11	12	13	14	15	16	17	18	19	20	21	22	23	24	DC	Points
2008	Russian Bears Motorsport	Lada 110 2.0	BRA; 1	BRA; 2	MEX; 1	MEX; 2	ESP; 1 Ret	ESP; 2 Ret	FRA; 1; 21	FRA; 2; 18	CZE; 1; 21	CZE; 2 Ret	POR; 1; 15	POR; 2; 21	GBR; 1 DNS	GBR; 2; 18	GER; 1; 14	GER; 2; 22	EUR; 1; 19	EUR; 2; 18	ITA; 1 Ret	ITA; 2; 19	JPN; 1; 18	JPN; 2; 17	MAC; 1; 21	MAC; 2 Ret	30th	0
2009	LADA Sport	LADA 110 2.0	BRA; 1; 17	BRA; 2; 17	MEX; 1; 17	MEX; 2; 17	MAR; 1; 20	MAR; 2; 14	FRA; 1 Ret	FRA; 2; 13	ESP; 1; 21	ESP; 2 Ret	CZE; 1; 14	CZE; 2; 18	POR; 1 Ret	POR; 2 DNS	GBR; 1 Ret	GBR; 2; 21									24th	0
2009	LADA Sport	LADA Priora																	GER; 1; 10	GER; 2; 20	ITA; 1 Ret	ITA; 2 DNS	JPN; 1; 13	JPN; 2 Ret	MAC; 1; 23	MAC; 2 DNS	24th	0
2015	Lada Sport Rosneft	Lada Vesta WTCC	ARG; 1	ARG; 2	MAR; 1	MAR; 2	HUN; 1	HUN; 2	GER; 1; 11	GER; 2; 9	RUS; 1; 10	RUS; 2 Ret	SVK; 1 NC	**SVK**; **2**; 6	FRA; 1; 10	FRA; 2; 11	POR; 1; 8	POR; 2 Ret	JPN; 1	JPN; 2	CHN; 1	CHN; 2	THA; 1	THA; 2	QAT; 1	QAT; 2	15th	16

=== Complete Porsche Supercup results ===
(key) (Races in bold indicate pole position) (Races in italics indicate fastest lap)

Year	Team	1	2	3	4	5	6	7	8	9	10	11	12	Pos.	Points
2007	Bleekemolen Race Planet	BHR	BHR	CAT	MON	MAG; 16	SIL; 11	NÜR; 6	HUN; 4	IST; Ret	SPA; 11	MNZ; Ret		14th	40
2008	DAMAC Kadach Racing	BHR; 10	BHR; Ret	CAT; 11	IST; 1	MON; 12	MAG; 2	SIL; Ret	**HOC**; 2	HUN; Ret	VAL; Ret	SPA; 2	MNZ; 19	7th	94
2010	Bleekemolen Harders Plaza Racing	BHR	BHR	CAT; 4	MON; 3	VAL; 4	SIL; 6	HOC; 5	HUN; 5	SPA; 2	MNZ; Ret			4th	98
2012	FE Racing by Land Motorsport	BHR	BHR	MON	VAL	SIL	HOC	HUN	HUN	SPA; 3	MNZ			NC‡	0‡
2013	Lechner Racing	CAT	MON	SIL	NÜR; 12	HUN	SPA	MNZ	YMC	YMC				NC‡	0‡
2014	MOMO-Megatron	CAT	MON	RBR	SIL	HOC	HUN	SPA; 9	MNZ; Ret	COA	COA			20th	7
2015	Fach Auto Tech	CAT	**MON**; 1	RBR	SIL	HUN								15th	29
2015	Land Motorsport						SPA; 12‡	SPA; 27†						15th	29
2015	MOMO Megatron Team PARTRAX								MNZ; 15	MNZ; 13	COA	COA		15th	29
2016	MOMO Megatron Team PARTRAX	CAT	MON	RBR	SIL	HUN	HOC; 11	SPA	MNZ	COA	COA			21st	6
2017	MOMO Megatron Team PARTRAX	CAT	CAT	MON	RBR	SIL	HUN	SPA	SPA	MNZ; 4	MEX	MEX		20th	14
2018	Fach Auto Tech	CAT; 2	MON; 4	RBR; 16	SIL; Ret	HOC; 13	HUN; 3	SPA; 7	MNZ; 6	MEX; 5	MEX; 12			8th	89
2019	Martinet by Alméras	CAT; 5	MON; 6	RBR; 4	SIL; 10	HOC; 6^{⹋}	HUN; Ret	SPA; 7	MNZ; 10	MEX; 6	MEX; 13			10th	71
2020	Fach Auto Tech	RBR; Ret	RBR; 11	HUN; Ret	SIL; 5	SIL; 13	CAT; 7	SPA; 6	MNZ; 19					11th	43
2021	Dinamic Motorsport	MON	RBR	RBR	HUN	SPA	ZND; 8	MNZ	MNZ					NC‡	0‡
2022	Martinet by Alméras	IMO; 13	MON; 10	SIL; 14	RBR; 6	LEC; 8	SPA; 20	ZND; Ret	MNZ; 11					12th	35
2023	Dinamic GT	MON; 10	RBR; 9	SIL; 5	HUN; 21	SPA; 14	ZND; 13	ZND; 13	MNZ; 12					11th	44
2024	Dinamic Motorsport	IMO; 12	MON; 6	RBR; 9	SIL; 9	HUN; 12	SPA; 9	ZND; 2	MNZ; 25					9th	60
2025	Proton Huber Competition	IMO; 8	MON; Ret	CAT; 16	RBR; 15	SPA; 12	HUN; Ret	ZND; 5	MNZ; Ret					14th	28
2026	Martinet by Alméras	MON; 7	CAT; 14	RBR; 15	SPA; 8	HUN; 16	ZND; 2	**ZND**; 2	MNZ; Ret					9th	63

^{‡} Van Lagen was a guest driver, therefore he was ineligible for points.
^{†} Driver did not finish the race, but was classified as he completed over 90% of the race distance.
^{⹋} No points awarded as less than 50% of race distance was completed.

=== 24 Hours of Le Mans results ===
Year	Team	Co-Drivers	Car	Class	Laps	Pos.	Class Pos.
2011	(Belgium) Prospeed Competition	(Belgium) Marc Goossens (Germany) Marco Holzer	Porsche 997 GT3-RSR	GTE; Pro	293	23rd	8th

=== Complete TCR International Series results ===
(key) (Races in bold indicate pole position) (Races in italics indicate fastest lap)

Year	Team	Car	1	2	3	4	5	6	7	8	9	10	11	12	13	14	15	16	17	18	19	20	DC	Points
2017	Leopard Racing Team WRT	Volkswagen Golf GTI TCR	RIM; 1	RIM; 2	BHR; 1	BHR; 2	SPA; 1	SPA; 2	MNZ; 1 Ret	MNZ; 2; 11	SAL; 1	SAL; 2	HUN; 1	HUN; 2	OSC; 1; 8	OSC; 2 Ret	CHA; 1	CHA; 2	ZHE; 1	ZHE; 2	DUB; 1	DUB; 2	29th	8

=== Complete TCR Europe Touring Car Series results ===
(key) (Races in bold indicate pole position) (Races in italics indicate fastest lap)

Year	Team	Car	1	2	3	4	5	6	7	8	9	10	11	12	13	14	DC	Points
2018	Leopard Lukoil Team WRT	Audi RS 3 LMS TCR	LEC; 1	LEC; 2	**ZAN**; **1**; 3^{1}	ZAN; 2; 2	SPA; 1	SPA; 2	HUN; 1	HUN; 2	ASS; 1	ASS; 2	MNZ; 1	MNZ; 2	CAT; 1	CAT; 2	13th	38

=== TCR Spa 500 results ===
Year	Team	Co-Drivers	Car	Class	Laps	Pos.	Class Pos.
2019	(Netherlands) NKPP Racing by Bas Koeten Racing	(Netherlands) Gijs Bessem (Netherlands) Christiaan Frankenhout (Netherlands) Harry Hilders	CUPRA León TCR	**PA**	27	DNF/Crash	DNF/Crash

Sporting positions
Preceded by Stefan de Groot	Dutch Formula Ford champion 2002	Succeeded by Nelson van der Pol
Preceded by Jeroen Bleekemolen	Benelux Formula Ford champion 2001-2002	Succeeded by Michel Florie
Preceded by Jan Heylen	Eurocup Mégane Trophy Champion; 2006	Succeeded by Pedro Petiz
