= 2004 German Formula Three Championship =

Seasons
- ← 2003 2005 →

The 2004 ATS Formel 3 Cup was a multi-event motor racing championship for single-seat open wheel formula racing cars that took place across Europe. The championship featured drivers competing in two-litre Formula Three racing cars built by Dallara which conform to the technical regulations, or formula, for the championship. It was the second edition of the ATS F3 Cup. It commenced on 24 April at Hockenheim and ended on 9 October at Oschersleben after nine double-header rounds.

HS Technik Motorsport driver Bastian Kolmsee clinched both the championship and his rookie title. He achieved four wins, to overcome his closest rival Timo Lienemann by nine points, who won two races. Third place went to Jan Heylen, who started his season at Lausitz and won six races. His JB Motorsport teammate Michael Devaney won races at Oschersleben and Assen. Thomas Holzer, who completed the top five, lost 54 points to Devaney in the main standings. Other wins were shared between the opening round winner Jan Seyffarth and Jochen Nerpel.

== Teams and drivers ==
All cars were powered by Opel engines – except for Seyffarth Motorsport cars that were powered by Renault – and were built on Dallara chassis.

Team	No.	Driver	Chassis	Status	Rounds
(Belgium) JB Motorsport	1	(Republic of Ireland) Michael Devaney	F302/010	R	All
(Belgium) JB Motorsport	2	(Belgium) Jan Heylen	F302/072		3–9
(Austria) Franz Wöss Racing	3	(Germany) Marcus Steinel	F302/087	R	All
(Austria) Franz Wöss Racing	4	(Austria) Franz Wöss	F399/072		4, 8
(Austria) Franz Wöss Racing	4	(Germany) Ina Fabry	F399/072		5
(Austria) Franz Wöss Racing	4	(Germany) Florian Schnitzenbaumer	F399/072		7
(Austria) Franz Wöss Racing	4	(Germany) André Fibier	F399/072		9
(Switzerland) Opel Team KMS	5	(Switzerland) Tobias Blättler	F302/009		1–5, 7–8
(Germany) FS Motorsport	6	(Germany) Franz Schmöller	F302/050	R	All
(Germany) FS Motorsport	7	(Germany) Markus Mann	F302/068		4–5
(Germany) FS Motorsport	7	(Germany) Peter Elkmann	F302/068		9
(Czech Republic) KFR Team F3	9	(Czech Republic) Tomáš Kostka	F302/044		1
(Czech Republic) KFR Team F3	10	(Germany) Jochen Nerpel	F302/044	R	2–9
(Germany) JMS Motorsport	11	(Italy) Claudio Consiglio	F301/010		1–3
(Germany) JMS Motorsport	11	(Italy) Yari Benedetti	F399/007		4–9
(Germany) JMS Motorsport	12	(Italy) Luca Iannaccone	F301/010		1–7, 9
(Germany) JMS Motorsport	12	(Germany) Kevin Fank	F301/010		8
(Switzerland) Bordoli Motorsport	15	(Switzerland) Roland Schmid	F300/011		7
(Austria) Petutschnig Engineering	16	(Argentina) Franco Coscia	F302/074		7–9
(Switzerland) Jo Zeller Racing	17	(Germany) Timo Lienemann	F302/073		All
(Germany) AM-Holzer Rennsport	19	(Germany) Thomas Holzer	F302/083		All
(Austria) HS Technik Motorsport	20	(Germany) Bastian Kolmsee	F302/033	R	All
(Austria) HS Technik Motorsport	21	(Austria) Roman Hoffmann	F301/016		4–6
(Germany) Rennsport Rössler	22	(Germany) Thomas Rössler	F301/031		1, 4, 8–9
(Germany) FBR	24	(Germany) Frank Brendecke	F302/007		All
(Czech Republic) Team I.S.R.	25	(Czech Republic) Filip Salaquarda	F303/008	R	All
(Germany) Leipert Motorsport	26	(Germany) Marcel Leipert	F302/005	R	All
(Netherlands) Van Amersfoort Racing	27	(China) Ho-Pin Tung	F302/084	R	All
(Germany) Seyffarth Motorsport	28	(Germany) Jan Seyffarth	F302/021	R	All
(Germany) Seyffarth Motorsport	29	(Germany) Maro Engel	F302/060		2
(Germany) Seyffarth Motorsport	29	(Germany) Gina-Maria Adenauer	F302/060		4–9
(Germany) Penker Racing	30	(Germany) Christopher Brück	F303/023		4
(Germany) Christian Zeller	32	(Germany) Christian Zeller	F300/050		4–5
(France) Remy Striebig	33	(France) Remy Striebig	F399/009		5

Icon	Class
R	Rookie

== Race calendar and results ==
With the exception of the round at TT Circuit Assen, all rounds took place on German soil.

Round		Circuit	Date	Pole position	Fastest lap	Winning driver	Winning team	Rookie Winner
1	R1	Hockenheimring	24 April	(Czech Republic) Tomáš Kostka	(Germany) Franz Schmöller	(Germany) Jan Seyffarth	(Germany) SMS Seyffarth Motorsport	(Germany) Jan Seyffarth
1	R2	Hockenheimring	25 April	(Czech Republic) Tomáš Kostka	(Germany) Jan Seyffarth	(Germany) Jan Seyffarth	(Germany) SMS Seyffarth Motorsport	(Germany) Jan Seyffarth
2	R1	Motorsport Arena Oschersleben	8 May	(Republic of Ireland) Michael Devaney	(Republic of Ireland) Michael Devaney	(Republic of Ireland) Michael Devaney	(Belgium) JB Motorsport	(Republic of Ireland) Michael Devaney
2	R2	Motorsport Arena Oschersleben	9 May	(Germany) Bastian Kolmsee	(Germany) Bastian Kolmsee	(Germany) Bastian Kolmsee	(Austria) HS Technik Motorsport	(Germany) Bastian Kolmsee
3	R1	TT Circuit Assen	22 May	(Germany) Timo Lienemann	(Germany) Bastian Kolmsee	(Republic of Ireland) Michael Devaney	(Belgium) JB Motorsport	(Republic of Ireland) Michael Devaney
3	R2	TT Circuit Assen	23 May	(Germany) Jan Seyffarth	(Germany) Thomas Holzer	(Germany) Timo Lienemann	(Switzerland) Jo Zeller Racing	(Germany) Timo Lienemann
4	R1	EuroSpeedway Lausitz	3 July	(Germany) Thomas Holzer	(Belgium) Jan Heylen	(Germany) Thomas Holzer	(Germany) AM-Holzer Rennsport	(Germany) Bastian Kolmsee
4	R2	EuroSpeedway Lausitz	4 July	(Belgium) Jan Heylen	(Belgium) Jan Heylen	(Germany) Jochen Nerpel	(Czech Republic) KFR Team F3	(Germany) Jochen Nerpel
5	R1	Nürburgring	10 July	(Belgium) Jan Heylen	(Belgium) Jan Heylen	(Belgium) Jan Heylen	(Belgium) JB Motorsport	(Germany) Bastian Kolmsee
5	R2	Nürburgring	11 July	(Belgium) Jan Heylen	(Belgium) Jan Heylen	(Belgium) Jan Heylen	(Belgium) JB Motorsport	(Germany) Timo Lienemann
6	R1	Sachsenring	14 August	(Belgium) Jan Heylen	(Germany) Bastian Kolmsee	(Germany) Bastian Kolmsee	(Austria) HS Technik Motorsport	(Germany) Bastian Kolmsee
6	R2	Sachsenring	15 August	(Germany) Timo Lienemann	(Germany) Thomas Holzer	(Germany) Timo Lienemann	(Switzerland) Jo Zeller Racing	(Germany) Timo Lienemann
7	R1	Nürburgring	28 August	(Belgium) Jan Heylen	(Belgium) Jan Heylen	(Belgium) Jan Heylen	(Belgium) JB Motorsport	(Germany) Jan Seyffarth
7	R2	Nürburgring	29 August	(Germany) Bastian Kolmsee	(Belgium) Jan Heylen	(Belgium) Jan Heylen	(Belgium) JB Motorsport	(Germany) Timo Lienemann
8	R1	EuroSpeedway Lausitz	11 September	(Belgium) Jan Heylen	(Belgium) Jan Heylen	(Belgium) Jan Heylen	(Belgium) JB Motorsport	(Germany) Timo Lienemann
8	R2	EuroSpeedway Lausitz	12 September	(Germany) Timo Lienemann	(Belgium) Jan Heylen	(Belgium) Jan Heylen	(Belgium) JB Motorsport	(Germany) Timo Lienemann
9	R1	Motorsport Arena Oschersleben	9 October	(Belgium) Jan Heylen	(China) Ho-Pin Tung	(Germany) Bastian Kolmsee	(Austria) HS Technik Motorsport	(Germany) Bastian Kolmsee
9	R2	Motorsport Arena Oschersleben	10 October	(Germany) Bastian Kolmsee	(Germany) Bastian Kolmsee	(Germany) Bastian Kolmsee	(Austria) HS Technik Motorsport	(Germany) Bastian Kolmsee

== Championship standings ==
=== Cup ===
- Points were awarded as follows:

1	2	3	4	5	6	7	8	9	10	PP
20	15	12	10	8	6	4	3	2	1	3

Pos	Driver	HOC		OSC1		ASS		LAU1		NÜR1		SAC		NÜR2		LAU2		OSC2		Pts
1	(Germany) Bastian Kolmsee	4	7	11	**1**	2	2	2	5	2	3	1	3	Ret	**Ret**	3	4	1	**1**	217
2	(Germany) Timo Lienemann	3	4	3	8	**4**	1	3	3	5	2	15	**1**	4	2	2	**2**	4	Ret	208
3	(Belgium) Jan Heylen							9	**2**	**1**	**1**	**14**	2	**1**	1	**1**	1	**5**	16	181
4	(Republic of Ireland) Michael Devaney	5	5	**1**	4	1	5	Ret	4	Ret	6	2	5	6	3	6	5	3	2	175
5	(Germany) Thomas Holzer	7	8	2	9	8	8	**1**	Ret	4	12	6	4	7	7	7	3	6	3	121
6	(Germany) Franz Schmöller	6	3	6	Ret	5	3	6	7	10	9	4	7	5	5	4	7	7	4	115
7	(China) Ho-Pin Tung	8	6	Ret	2	Ret	4	12	6	3	4	5	11	3	Ret	Ret	6	2	5	111
8	(Germany) Jan Seyffarth	1	1	7	3	Ret	**Ret**	7	10	6	13	3	8	2	Ret	10	10	Ret	7	106
9	(Germany) Jochen Nerpel			9	7	6	7	4	1	20	11	7	6	12	4	5	8	8	9	82
10	(Germany) Marcel Leipert	9	9	5	5	3	6	10	9	8	7	8	Ret	9	8	18	9	9	6	66
11	(Czech Republic) Filip Salaquarda	Ret	DNS	4	11	Ret	Ret	5	8	13	5	Ret	9	Ret	6	9	11	Ret	8	42
12	(Czech Republic) Tomáš Kostka	**2**	**2**																	36
13	(Germany) Marcus Steinel	10	10	8	12			13	Ret	9	10	10	12	8	10	12	16	15	12	13
14	(Italy) Yari Benedetti									13	14	9	10	10	Ret	8	12	11	10	8
15	(Germany) Maro Engel			10	6															7
16	(Germany) Markus Mann							11	Ret	7	8									7
17	(Germany) Frank Brendecke	Ret	11	13	13	7	9	17	Ret	16	17	12	14	Ret	12	16	17	13	17	6
18	(Germany) Christopher Brück							8	Ret											3
19	(Italy) Luca Iannaccone	13	Ret	15	Ret	9	10	21	15	19	18	13	15	15	15			16	19	3
20	(Argentina) Franco Coscia													11	9	15	13	17	14	2
21	(Italy) Claudio Consiglio	11	Ret	12	10	Ret	Ret													1
22	(Germany) Peter Elkmann																	10	11	1
23	(Germany) Gina-Maria Adenauer							16	11	17	15	11	13	13	Ret	11	14	12	15	0
24	(Switzerland) Tobias Blättler	Ret	Ret	14	14	Ret	Ret	15	Ret	14	16			14	11	17	19			0
25	(Germany) Thomas Rössler	12	12					20	14							14	18	14	18	0
26	(Austria) Roman Hoffmann							14	12	12	21									0
27	(Germany) Kevin Fank															13	15			0
28	(Germany) Florian Schnitzenbaumer													DNS	13					0
29	(Germany) André Fibier																	DNS	13	0
30	(Switzerland) Roland Schmid													16	14					0
31	(Germany) Ina Fabry									15	20									0
32	(Austria) Franz Wöss							18	Ret							19	20			0
33	(Germany) Christian Zeller							19	Ret	18	Ret									0
34	(France) Remy Striebig									Ret	19									0
Pos	Driver	HOC		OSC1		ASS		LAU1		NÜR1		SAC		NÜR2		LAU2		OSC2		Pts

Colour	Result
Gold	Winner
Silver	Second place
Bronze	Third place
Green	Points classification
Blue	Non-points classification
Blue	Non-classified finish (NC)
Purple	Retired, not classified (Ret)
Red	Did not qualify (DNQ)
Red	Did not pre-qualify (DNPQ)
Black	Disqualified (DSQ)
White	Did not start (DNS)
White	Withdrew (WD)
White	Race cancelled (C)
Blank	Did not practice (DNP)
Blank	Did not arrive (DNA)
Blank	Excluded (EX)

**Bold** - Pole
Italics - Fastest Lap

=== Rookie ===
- Points were awarded as follows:

1	2	3
10	6	4

Pos	Driver	HOC		OSC1		ASS		LAU1		NÜR1		SAC		NÜR2		LAU2		OSC2		Pts
1	(Germany) Bastian Kolmsee	4	7	11	1	2	2	2	5	2	3	1	3	Ret	Ret	3	4	1	1	100
2	(Germany) Timo Lienemann	3	4	3	8	4	1	3	3	5	2	15	1	4	2	2	2	4	Ret	98
3	(Republic of Ireland) Michael Devaney	5	5	1	4	1	5	Ret	4	Ret	6	2	5	6	3	6	5	3	2	58
4	(Germany) Jan Seyffarth	1	1	7	3	Ret	Ret	7	10	6	13	3	8	2	Ret	10	10	Ret	7	38
5	(China) Ho-Pin Tung	8	6	Ret	2	Ret	4	12	6	3	4	5	11	3	Ret	Ret	6	2	5	36
6	(Germany) Jochen Nerpel			9	7	6	7	4	1	20	11	7	6	12	4	5	8	8	9	22
7	(Czech Republic) Filip Salaquarda	Ret	DNS	4	11	Ret	Ret	5	8	13	5	Ret	9	Ret	6	9	11	Ret	8	4
8	(Germany) Marcel Leipert	9	9	5	5	3	6	10	9	8	7	8	Ret	9	8	18	9	9	6	4
Pos	Driver	HOC		OSC1		ASS		LAU1		NÜR1		SAC		NÜR2		LAU2		OSC2		Pts
