= Bastian Kolmsee =

German racing driver

Bastian Kolmsee (born 11 March 1981 in Engelskirchen, Germany) is a German racing driver who won the 2004 German Formula 3 Championship.

Kolmsee began karting in 1993 before moving up the domestic Formula Ford and Formula VW championships. He moved up to Formula 3 in 2004, winning the championship in his first season.

Kolmsee has more recently been seen in the German Seat Leon Cupra Cup.

Sporting positions
Preceded by João Paulo de Oliveira	German Formula Three Champion; 2004	Succeeded by Peter Elkmann
