= Paul Cauhaupé =

French racing driver (born 2005)

- Cauhaupé competing in the 2026 Porsche Supercup round at Circuit Zandvoort
- Nationality: (France) French
- Born: 16 July 2005 (age 21) Toulouse, France

Porsche Supercup career
- Debut season: 2026
- Current team: Martinet by Alméras
- Categorisation: FIA Silver
- Car number: 16
- Starts: 5
- Wins: 0
- Podiums: 1
- Poles: 1
- Fastest laps: 0
- Best finish: TBD in 2026

Porsche Carrera Cup France career
- Debut season: 2024
- Current team: Martinet by Alméras
- Starts: 30
- Wins: 0
- Podiums: 10
- Poles: 4
- Fastest laps: 1
- Best finish: 3rd in 2025

Previous series
- 2022–2023 2022 2021: GT4 European Series; Alpine Elf Europa Cup; Trophée Mitjet 2L

Paul Cauhaupé (French pronunciation: [pɔl kupe]; born 16 July 2005) is a French racing driver who competes in Porsche Supercup and Porsche Carrera Cup France with Martinet by Alméras.

== Career ==
=== GT4 European Series ===
==== 2022 ====
Cauhaupé entered the GT4 European Series during the last round of the 2022 season at Barcelona for Autosport GP. He finished sixth in race one and retired in race two.

==== 2023 ====
Cauhaupé returned to the series in 2023, driving for Autosport GP LS Group Performance in the Silver Cup. Fellow Frenchman Simon Tirman joined Cauhaupé for the full season. The pair were consistent points scorers throughout the season. Cauhaupé scored his first podium in race one at the Hockenheimring. Both Cauhaupé and Tirman finished eighth in the championship.

=== Porsche Carrera Cup France ===
==== 2024 ====
In 2024, Cauhaupé moved to Porsche one-make competition in the Porsche Carrera Cup France. He joined CLRT Schumacher for the full season. Cauhaupé scored points in every race, including a maiden podium at Spa-Francorchamps.

==== 2025 ====
Cauhaupé returned to the championship for the 2025 season, switching to ABM for the season. His season started off strong, finishing on the podium in both races at Barcelona. Cauhaupé carried this momentum into the next round at Dijon-Prenois, where he secured a third consecutive podium in race one, and a solid fifth place in race two. At Misano, he qualified on pole for both races. In race one, Cauhaupé lost the lead early, but still finished on the podium in third. Unlike race one, Cauhaupé maintained control of the lead and crossed the finish line in first. However, he received a post race five-second time penalty for a false start, dropping him down to third. Despite this, Cauhaupé sat second in the championship, still in the hunt for the title. Championship leader Marcus Amand extended his lead at Valencia, while Cauhaupé lost points to Amand with eighth and fifth place finishes. At the final round of the season at Paul Ricard, Cauhaupé ended with two more podiums. He ultimately lost out on title to Amand, and Cauhaupé finished third in the standings. Cauhaupé's success in the 2025 season awarded him the opportunity to compete in the Porsche Shootout International.

==== 2026 ====
Cauhaupé switched teams for a third season, moving to Martinet by Alméras for the 2026 season.

=== Porsche Supercup ===
==== 2025 ====
Cauhaupé made a two appearances in the Porsche Supercup with Martinet by Alméras at Barcelona and Monza, where he finished seventh in both races.

==== 2026 ====
Alongside his campaign in the Porsche Carrera Cup France, Cauhaupé signed with Martinet by Alméras for the full 2026 Porsche Supercup. At the second round in Barcelona, he qualified second on the grid. During the race, Cauhaupé stayed in the fight for the podium with Keagan Masters and teammate Theo Oeverhaus. While he crossed the line in third, a penalty for Masters moved Cauhaupé up to second, his best result to date. Cauhaupé also finished first in the rookies, and got his first rookie win of the season.

== Karting record ==
=== Karting career summary ===
Season	Series	Team	Position
2018	National Karting Series — Cadet	Parolin	22nd
2018	Rotax Max Challenge France — Cadet	Parolin	20th
2019	National Karting Series — National	Fernando Alonso Kart	23rd
2019	FFSA French Karting Championship — National	Fernando Alonso Kart	45th
2020	Open Kart — National	Kosmic	10th
2020	National Karting Series — National	Kosmic	43rd

== Racing record ==
=== Racing career summary ===
Season	Series	Team	Races	Wins	Poles	F/Laps	Podiums	Points	Position
2021	Trophée Mitjet 2L	Pole Position 81	8	0	0	0	2	73.5	22nd
2022	Alpine Elf Europa Cup	Patrick Roger Autosport GP	12	3	1	2	7	146	**3rd**
2022	GT4 European Series	Autosport GP	2	0	0	0	0	8	20th
2023	GT4 European Series	Autosport GP LS Group Performance	10	0	0	0	1	59	8th
2024	Porsche Carrera Cup France	CLRT Schumacher	12	0	0	0	1	126	5th
2025	Porsche Carrera Cup France	ABM	12	0	2	1	7	182	**3rd**
2025	Porsche Supercup	Martinet by Alméras	2	0	0	0	0	0	NC†
2026	Porsche Carrera Cup France	Martinet by Alméras	12	5	7	5	8	223	**2nd**
2026	Porsche Supercup	Martinet by Alméras	8	1	1	0	2	67	6th

† As Cauhaupé was a guest driver, he was ineligible to score points. * Season still in progress.

=== Complete Trophée Mitjet 2L results ===
(key) (Races in bold indicate pole position; results in italics indicate fastest lap)

Year	Entrant	1	2	3	4	5	6	7	8	9	10	11	12	13	14	Rank	Points	Ref
2021	Pole Position 81	NOG; 1	NOG; 2	ALB; 1	ALB; 2	ALB; 3	ALB; 4	LED; 1; 7	LED; 2; 4	LED; 3 Ret	LED; 4; 31	LEC; 1; 16	LEC; 2; 3	LEC; 3; 10	LEC; 4; 2	22nd	73.5	

=== Complete Alpine Elf Europa Cup results ===
(key) (Races in bold indicate pole position; results in italics indicate fastest lap)

Year	Entrant	1	2	3	4	5	6	7	8	9	10	11	12	Rank	Points	Ref
2022	Patrick Roger Autosport GP	NOG; 1 Ret	NOG; 2; 3	MAG; 1; 2	MAG; 2; 1	ZAN; 1; 5	ZAN; 2; 3	CAT; 1; 1	CAT; 2; 6	MNZ; 1; 12	MNZ; 2; 4	**LEC**; **1**; 1	LEC; 2; 2	3rd	146	

=== Complete GT4 European Series results ===
(key) (Races in bold indicate pole position; results in italics indicate fastest lap)

Year	Entrant	Class	Chassis	Engine	1	2	3	4	5	6	7	8	9	10	11	12	Rank	Points	Ref
2022	Autosport GP	Silver	Alpine A110 GT4	Renault TCe M5Pt 1.8 L Turbocharged I4	IMO; 1	IMO; 2	LEC; 1	LEC; 2	MIS; 1	MIS; 2	SPA; 1	SPA; 2	HOC; 1	HOC; 2	CAT; 1; 6	CAT; 2 Ret	20th	8	
2023	Autosport GP LS Group Performance	Silver	Alpine A110 GT4	Renault TCe M5Pt 1.8 L Turbocharged I4	MNZ; 1; 11	MNZ; 2; 9	LEC; 1; 5	LEC; 2; 13	SPA; 1 DNS	SPA; 2 DNS	MIS; 1 Ret	MIS; 2; 10	HOC; 1; 2	HOC; 2; 5	CAT; 1; 5	CAT; 2; 6	8th	59	

=== Complete Porsche Carrera Cup France results ===
(key) (Races in bold indicate pole position; results in italics indicate fastest lap)

Year	Entrant	1	2	3	4	5	6	7	8	9	10	11	12	Rank	Points	Ref
2024	CLRT Schumacher	CAT; 1; 9	CAT; 2; 9	LEC; 1; 5	LEC; 2; 11	SPA; 1; 4	SPA; 2; 2	DIJ; 1; 6	DIJ; 2; 6	MUG; 1; 6	MUG; 2; 12	ALG; 1; 5	ALG; 2; 5	5th	126	
2025	ABM	CAT; 1; 3	CAT; 2; 2	DIJ; 1; 3	DIJ; 2; 5	SPA; 1; 5	SPA; 2; 6	**MIS**; **1**; 3	**MIS**; **2**; 3	VAL; 1; 8	VAL; 2; 5	LEC; 1; 2	LEC; 2; 3	3rd	182	
2026	Martinet by Alméras	CAT; 1 Ret	CAT; 2; 11	**DIJ**; **1**; 7	**DIJ**; **2**; 4	SPA; 1; 2	SPA; 2; 2	MAG; 1; 1	MAG; 2; 1	ZAN; 1; 2	ZAN; 2; 1	LEC; 1; 1	LEC; 2; 1	2nd	223	

* Season still in progress.

=== Complete Porsche Supercup results ===
(key) (Races in bold indicate pole position; results in italics indicate fastest lap)

Year	Entrant	1	2	3	4	5	6	7	8	Rank	Points	Ref
2025	Martinet by Alméras	IMO	MON	CAT; 7	RBR	SPA	HUN	ZND	MNZ; 7	NC†	0	
2026	Martinet by Alméras	MON; 16	CAT; 2	**RBR**; 9	SPA; 5	HUN; Ret	ZND; 1; 1	ZND; 2; 19	MNZ; 11	6th	67	

† As Cauhaupé was a guest driver, he was ineligible to score championship points. * Season still in progress.
