= Victor Bernier =

French racing driver (born 2004)

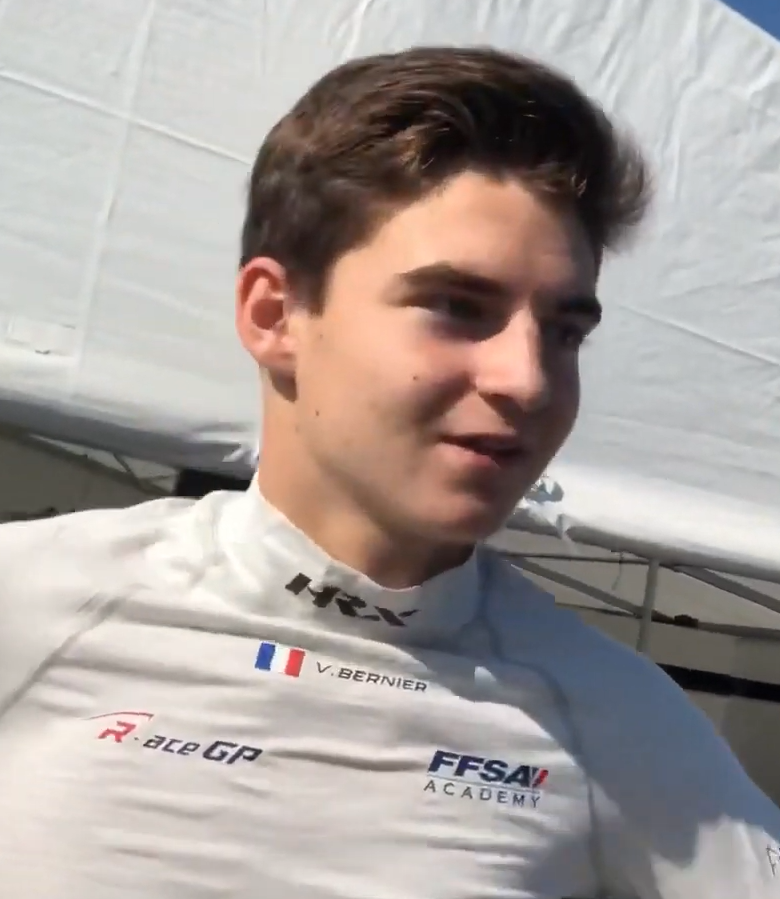
- Bernier at the Hockenheimring in 2021
- Nationality: (France) French
- Born: 26 June 2004 (age 22) Saint-André-des-Eaux, France

Porsche Supercup career
- Current team: Martinet by Alméras
- Categorisation: FIA Silver
- Car number: 17
- Starts: 7 (7 entries)
- Wins: 0
- Podiums: 0
- Poles: 0
- Fastest laps: 0
- Best finish: 19th in 2024

Previous series
- 2023 2022–23 2020–2021 2020–2021 2019: TTE Formula Renault Cup; FRECA; ADAC Formula 4 Italian F4 Championship; French F4 Championship

Victor Bernier (born 26 June 2004) is a French racing driver. He won the French F4 Junior title in 2019 and scored podiums in the Formula Regional European Championship and Porsche Carrera Cup France.

== Early career ==
=== Karting ===
Bernier began karting competitively in 2013, and won a number of national championships before becoming the Junior Karting World Champion in 2018, ahead of Gabriele Minì and Gabriel Bortoleto. He received a Volant d'Or award from the French Federation of Automobile Sport as a reward for his karting exploits.

=== Formula 4 ===
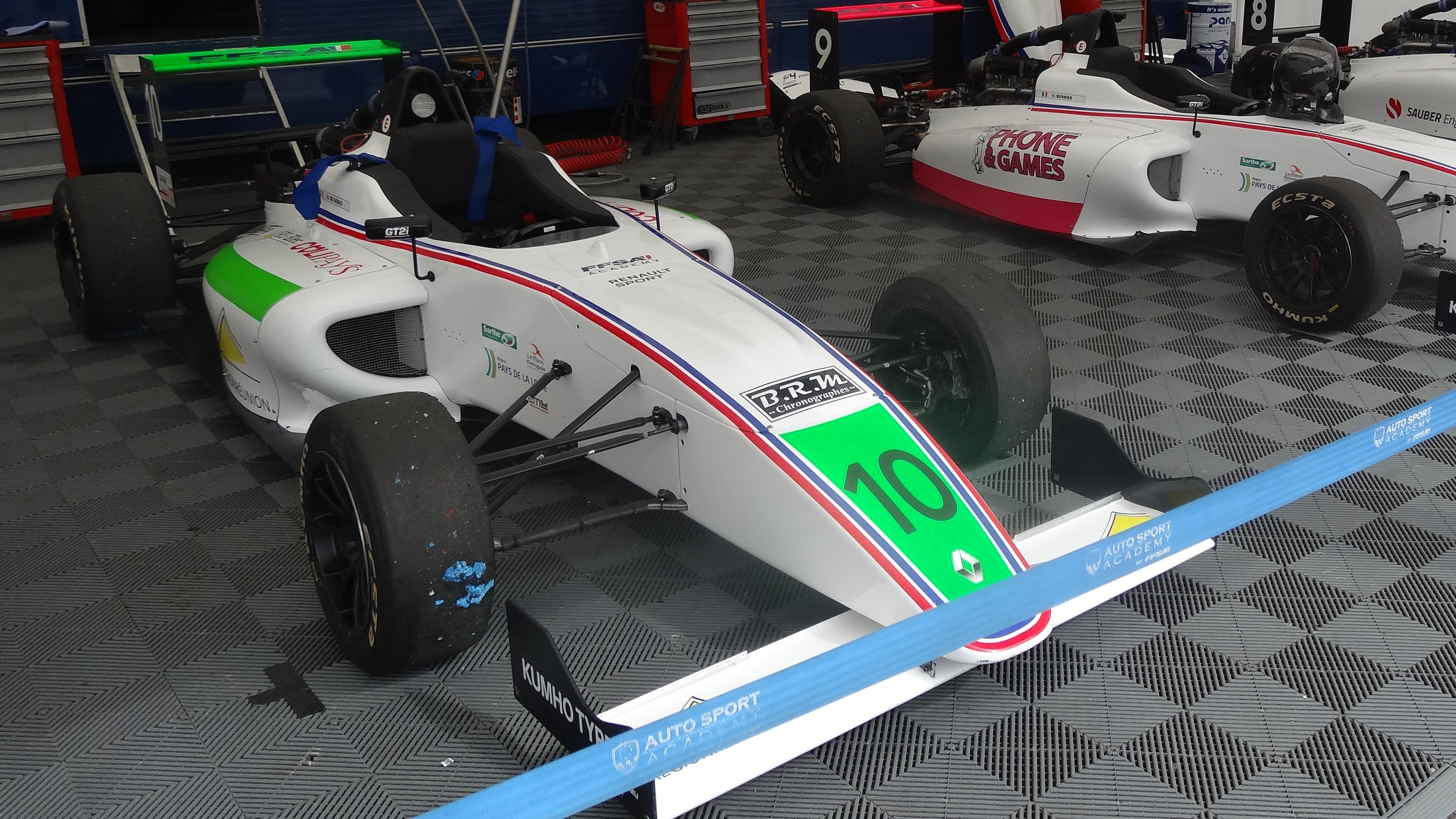
Bernier's car for the 2019 French F4 Championship

Bernier made his car racing debut in 2019, competing in the French F4 series at the age of fourteen, meaning that he became one of the series' junior drivers along with Isack Hadjar and Paul-Adrien Pallot. His season started out modestly, as he would only score three top ten finishes in the first two rounds at Nogaro and Pau, however he would take the first podium of his single-seater career at the following event at Spa. Bernier's results improved steadily from there, as he was able to finish in the top-five and on the podium more consistently, which ultimately culminated in a win at the final round of the season. He finished the season fourth in the FFSA Academy points standings and took a dominant title in the Juniors' championship.

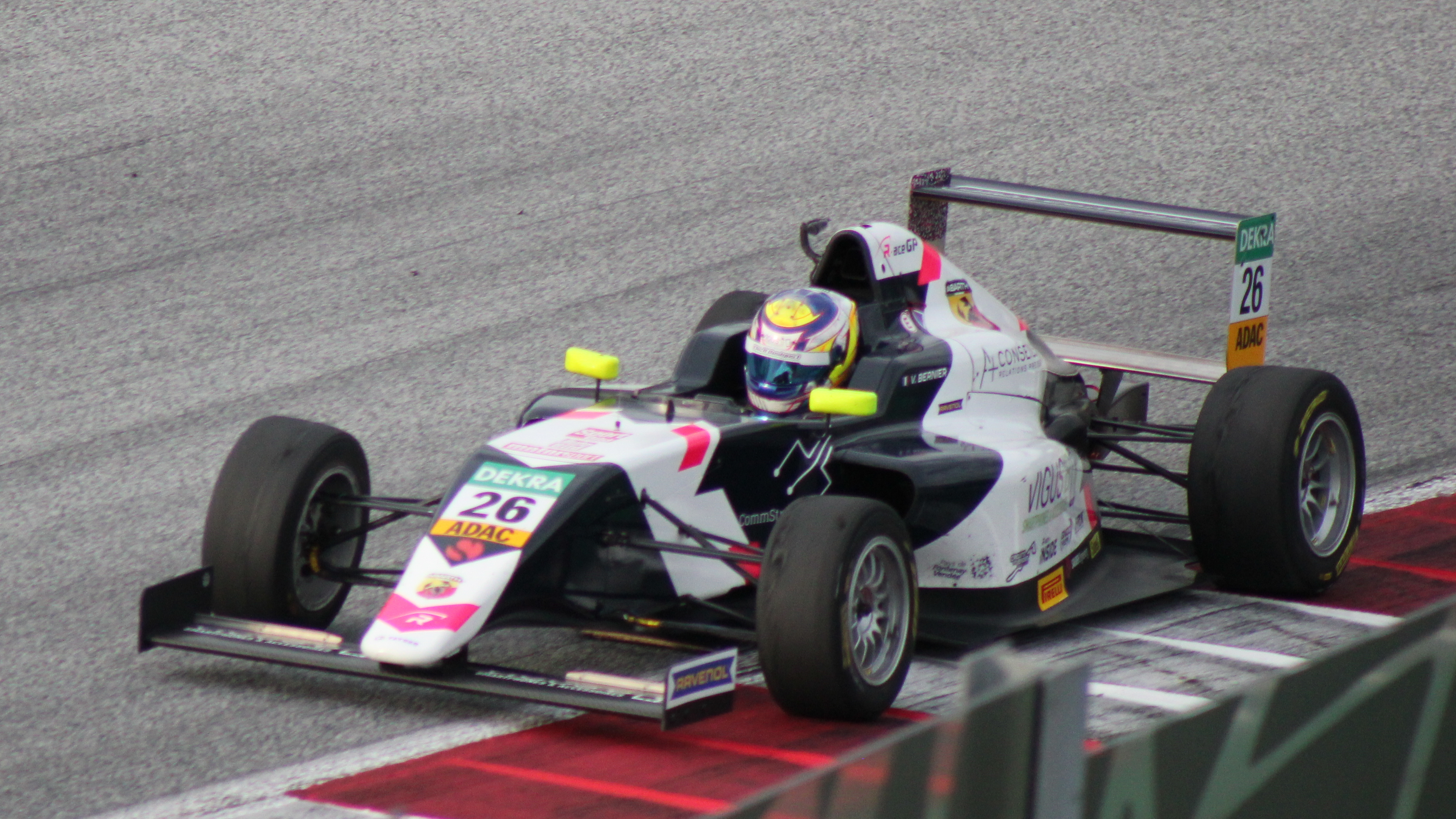
Bernier racing in the 2021 ADAC Formula 4 Championship at the Red Bull Ring.

For the 2020 season, Bernier moved to R-ace GP to contest the ADAC Formula 4 Championship, where he would partner Kirill Smal. He scored two victories, both in the reversed-grid races at the Hockenheimring and Lausitzring respectively, and finished fifth in the championship, ahead of his teammate. In addition, Bernier took part in the third round of that year's Italian F4 series, scoring a single point. Bernier remained in ADAC F4 the following year, this time driving with compatriots Sami Meguetounif and Marcus Amand. Bernier generally beat his teammates over the race weekends and took a sole win in Hockenheim after the original winner Ollie Bearman had received a penalty for causing a collision. He ended his final season in Formula 4 with four podiums and a fourth place in the overall results.

=== Formula Regional ===
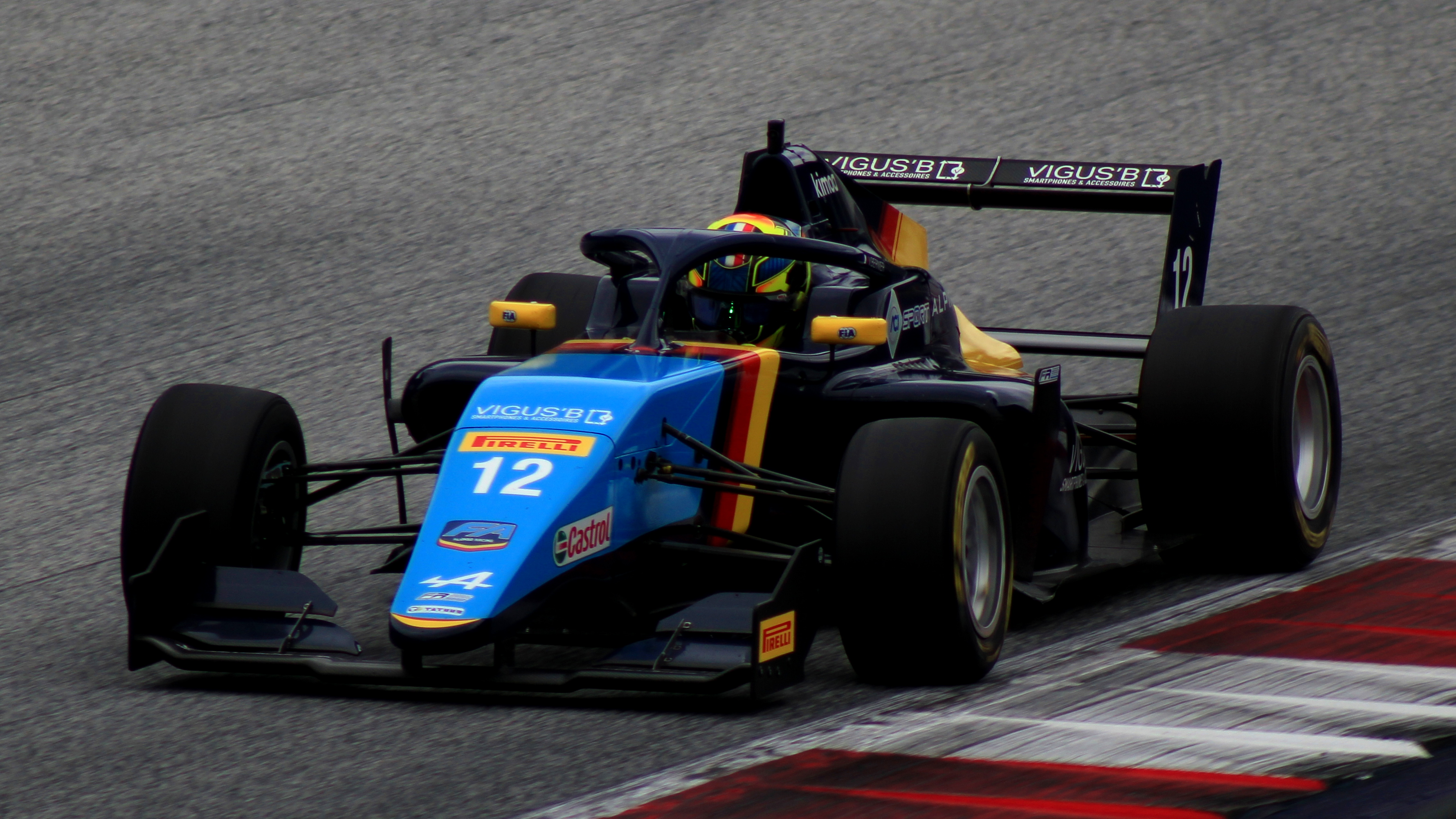
Bernier racing in the 2022 Formula Regional European Championship at the Red Bull Ring.

In 2022, Bernier progressed to the Formula Regional level, racing in the Formula Regional European Championship for FA Racing alongside French F4 champion Esteban Masson and Colombian Nicolás Baptiste. He struggled to score points throughout the campaign, only taking a lone ninth place until the final round at Mugello. There, Bernier finished second on Saturday, thus propelling himself to 17th in the standings.

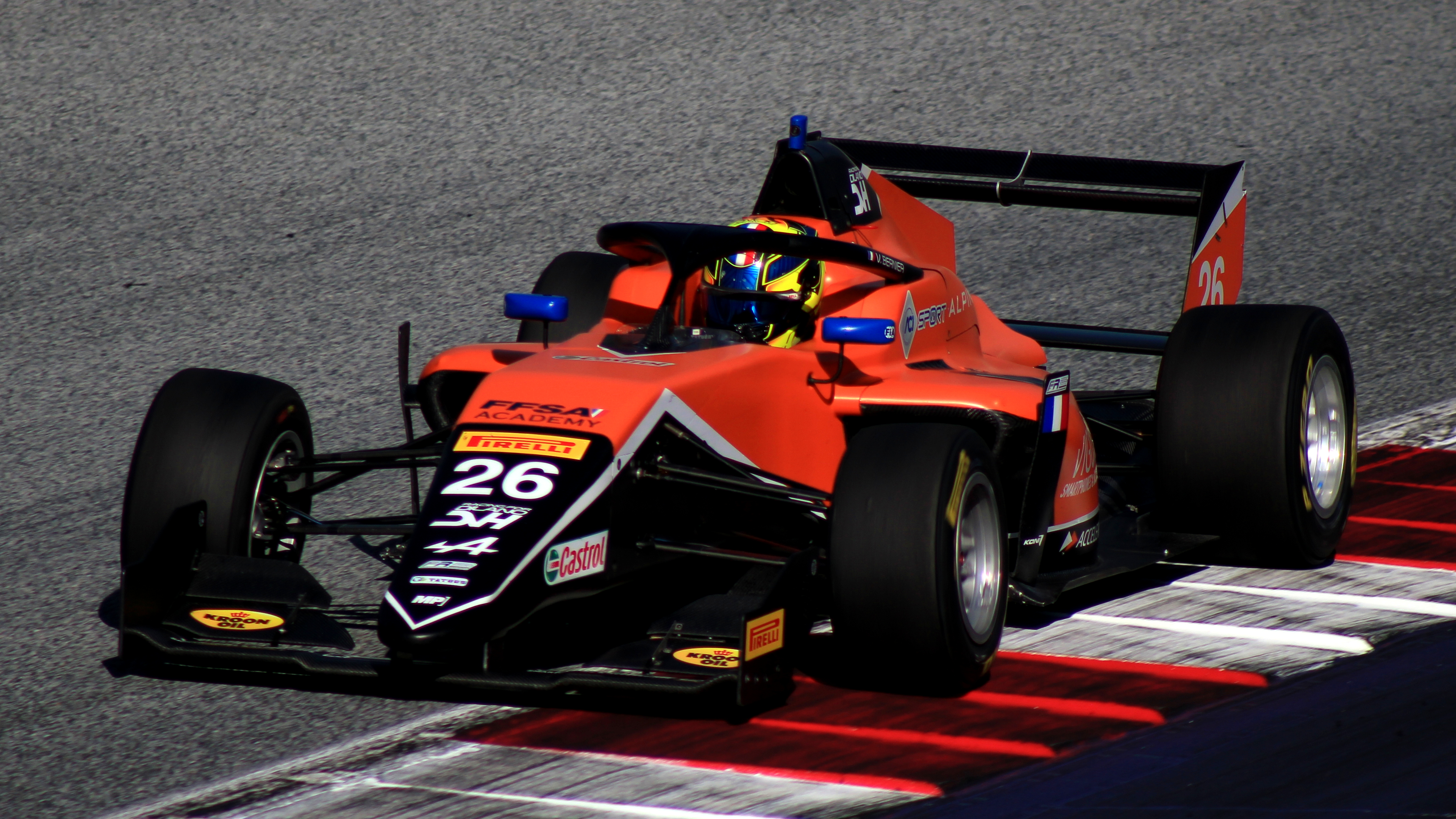
Bernier racing in the 2023 Formula Regional European Championship at the Red Bull Ring.

Remaining in FRECA for 2023, Bernier switched to MP Motorsport. Though points finishes were easier to come by, the Frenchman, his team, and teammate Sami Meguetounif were rocked by the passing of fellow MP driver Dilano van 't Hoff at Spa-Francorchamps, which resulted in the team's withdrawal for the subsequent round. After their return, Bernier managed to score points on three further occasions, results which included a second place at Monza he inherited after two drivers ahead were penalised. This placed him 15th at season's end, six positions below Meguetounif.

== Sportscar career ==
Bernier made his sportscar debut in 2024, driving in the Porsche Cup category alongside Pierre Martinet and Gérard Tremblay during the opening round of the Ultimate Cup Series. He then joined Martinet's eponymous team in a double campaign of the Porsche Carrera Cup France and Porsche Supercup series. The latter campaign proved to be underwhelming, as Bernier only finished inside the top-fifteen on three occasions. He missed the penultimate round before having a notable error on the final lap of the Monza season finale, crashing into the side of rookie class title contender Kas Haverkort after rejoining sharply from the Roggia chicane. Bernier ended the campaign 19th in the points standings, losing out to teammate Mathys Jaubert.

== Personal life ==
Bernier completed his studies whilst living together with his former F4 teammate Sami Meguetounif.

On arrival to FA Racing, the team set up by two-time Formula One World Champion Fernando Alonso, Bernier stated that Alonso had always been an example to him.

Bernier's younger brother Augustin is also a racing driver, who became the French Karting Champion in the OK-Junior class in 2021.

== Racing record ==
=== Racing career summary ===
Season	Series	Team	Races	Wins	Poles	F/Laps	Podiums	Points	Position
2019	French F4 Championship	FFSA Academy	21	1	0	1	6	154	4th
2020	ADAC Formula 4 Championship	R-ace GP	21	2	0	3	6	225	5th
2020	Italian F4 Championship	R-ace GP	3	0	0	0	0	1	28th
2021	ADAC Formula 4 Championship	R-ace GP	18	1	0	2	4	167	4th
2021	Italian F4 Championship	R-ace GP	6	0	0	0	0	30	13th
2022	Formula Regional European Championship	FA Racing by MP	19	0	0	0	1	20	17th
2023	Formula Regional European Championship	MP Motorsport	18	0	0	0	1	42	15th
2023	TTE Formula Renault Cup	Event 4 You	2	1	1	2	2	0	NC†
2024	Ultimate Cup Series Endurance GT-Touring Challenge - Porsche Cup	Martinet by Alméras	2	0	0	1	0	47	5th
2024	Ultimate Cup Series Endurance GT-Touring Challenge - Porsche Cup	GP Racing Team	1	1	0	0	1	47	5th
2024	Porsche Supercup	Martinet by Alméras	7	0	0	0	0	11	19th
2024	Porsche Carrera Cup France	Martinet by Alméras	12	0	0	0	1	113	6th
2025	Middle East Trophy - 992	GP Racing Team	1	0	0	0	0	0	NC†
2026	European Endurance Prototype Cup	Extreme Limite	3	0	0	0	0	19.5	11th*
2026	Porsche Carrera Cup France	ABM	4	0	0	0	1	0	NC†

* Season still in progress.

=== Complete French F4 Juniors' Championship results ===
(key) (Races in bold indicate pole position) (Races in italics indicate fastest lap)

Year	1	2	3	4	5	6	7	8	9	10	11	12	13	14	15	16	17	18	19	20	21	Pos	Points
2019	NOG; 1; 2	NOG; 2; 1	NOG; 3; 1	PAU; 1 Ret	PAU; 2 Ret	PAU; 3; 1	SPA; 1; 2	SPA; 2; 2	SPA; 3; 3	LÉD; 1; 1	LÉD; 2; 2	LÉD; 3; 2	HUN; 1; 1	HUN; 2; 1	HUN; 3; 1	MAG; 1; 1	MAG; 2; 1	MAG; 3; 3	LEC; 1; 1	LEC; 2; 1	LEC; 3; 1	1st	330.5

=== Complete French F4 Championship results ===
(key) (Races in bold indicate pole position) (Races in italics indicate fastest lap)

Year	1	2	3	4	5	6	7	8	9	10	11	12	13	14	15	16	17	18	19	20	21	Pos	Points
2019	NOG; 1; 9	NOG; 2; 6	NOG; 3; 12	PAU; 1 Ret	PAU; 2 Ret	PAU; 3; 8	SPA; 1; 3	SPA; 2; 7	SPA; 3; 12	LÉD; 1; 4	LÉD; 2; 10	LÉD; 3; 4	HUN; 1; 4	HUN; 2; 3	HUN; 3; 3	MAG; 1; 4	MAG; 2; 4	MAG; 3; 15	LEC; 1; 2	LEC; 2; 3	LEC; 3; 1	4th	154

=== Complete ADAC Formula 4 Championship results ===
(key) (Races in bold indicate pole position) (Races in italics indicate fastest lap)

Year	Team	1	2	3	4	5	6	7	8	9	10	11	12	13	14	15	16	17	18	19	20	21	Pos	Points
2020	R-ace GP	LAU1; 1; 7	LAU1; 2; 4	LAU1; 3; 2	NÜR1; 1; 4	NÜR1; 2; 9	NÜR1; 3; 7	HOC; 1 Ret	HOC; 2; 5	HOC; 3; 1	NÜR2; 1; 7	NÜR2; 2; 11	NÜR2; 3; 11	RBR; 1; 2	RBR; 2; 5	RBR; 3; 3	LAU2; 1; 2	LAU2; 2; 5	LAU2; 3; 1	OSC; 1; 4	OSC; 2; 6	OSC; 3; 4	5th	225
2021	R-ace GP	RBR; 1; 6	RBR; 2; 8	RBR; 3; 13	ZAN; 1; 6	ZAN; 2; 4	ZAN; 3; 5	HOC1; 1; 6	HOC1; 2; 9	HOC1; 3; 5	SAC; 1; 4	SAC; 2; 3	SAC; 3; 9	HOC2; 1; 1	HOC2; 2; 3	HOC2; 3; 9	NÜR; 1; 6	NÜR; 2; 7	NÜR; 3; 2				4th	167

=== Complete Italian F4 Championship results ===
(key) (Races in bold indicate pole position) (Races in italics indicate fastest lap)

Year	Team	1	2	3	4	5	6	7	8	9	10	11	12	13	14	15	16	17	18	19	20	21	Pos	Points
2020	R-ace GP	MIS; 1	MIS; 2	MIS; 3	IMO1; 1	IMO1; 2	IMO1; 3	RBR; 1 Ret	RBR; 2; 10	RBR; 3; 21	MUG; 1	MUG; 2	MUG; 3	MNZ; 1	MNZ; 2	MNZ; 3	IMO2; 1	IMO2; 2	IMO2; 3	VLL; 1	VLL; 2	VLL; 3	28th	1
2021	R-ace GP	LEC; 1; 6	LEC; 2 Ret	LEC; 3; 13	MIS; 1; 7	MIS; 2; 5	MIS; 3; 7	VLL; 1	VLL; 2	VLL; 3	IMO; 1	IMO; 2	IMO; 3	RBR; 1	RBR; 2	RBR; 3	MUG; 1	MUG; 2	MUG; 3	MNZ; 1	MNZ; 2	MNZ; 3	13th	30

=== Complete Formula Regional European Championship results ===
(key) (Races in bold indicate pole position) (Races in italics indicate fastest lap)

Year	Team	1	2	3	4	5	6	7	8	9	10	11	12	13	14	15	16	17	18	19	20	DC	Points
2022	FA Racing by MP	MNZ; 1; 14	MNZ; 2; 17	IMO; 1 NC	IMO; 2; 32†	MCO; 1 DNQ	MCO; 2; 17	LEC; 1; 23	LEC; 2 Ret	ZAN; 1; 9	ZAN; 2; 13	HUN; 1; 18	HUN; 2 Ret	SPA; 1; 15	SPA; 2; 17	RBR; 1; 26	RBR; 2; 13	CAT; 1 Ret	CAT; 2 Ret	MUG; 1; 2	MUG; 2; 15	17th	20
2023	MP Motorsport	IMO; 1; 12	IMO; 2; 4	CAT; 1; 12	CAT; 2; 15	HUN; 1; 17	HUN; 2; 20	SPA; 1; 9	SPA; 2; 15	MUG; 1	MUG; 2	LEC; 1; 7	LEC; 2; 17	RBR; 1; 15	RBR; 2; 11	MNZ; 1; 2	MNZ; 2; 19	ZAN; 1 Ret	ZAN; 2; 16	HOC; 1; 15	HOC; 2; 8	15th	42

=== Complete Porsche Carrera Cup France results ===
(key) (Races in bold indicate pole position) (Races in italics indicate fastest lap)

Year	Team	1	2	3	4	5	6	7	8	9	10	11	12	Pos	Points
2024	Martinet by Alméras	CAT; 1; 5	CAT; 2; 5	LEC; 1 DSQ	LEC; 2; 2	SPA; 1; 9	SPA; 2; 7	DIJ; 1; 8	DIJ; 2; 11	MUG; 1; 7	MUG; 2; 4	ALG; 1; 7	ALG; 2; 8	6th	113

^{*}Season still in progress.

=== Complete Porsche Supercup results ===
(key) (Races in bold indicate pole position) (Races in italics indicate fastest lap)

Year	Team	1	2	3	4	5	6	7	8	Pos.	Points
2024	Martinet by Alméras	IMO; 11	MON; 14	RBR; 24†	SIL; 17	HUN; 15	SPA; 19	ZAN	MNZ; 26	19th	11

^{*} Season still in progress.
