= 2026 Porsche Carrera Cup France =

Motor racing championship

The 2026 Porsche Carrera Cup France was the 40th season of Porsche Carrera Cup France. The season began at Circuit de Barcelona-Catalunya on 10 April and finished at Circuit Paul Ricard on 11 October.

== Teams and drivers ==
Team	No.	Driver	Class	Rounds
(France) Debard Automobiles by Racetivity	2	(France) Hugo Chevalier	P	All
(France) Debard Automobiles by Racetivity	22	(Switzerland) Philippe Giauque (Note: Philippe Giauque was originally entered for round 6 but withdrew after the first practice session, and was replaced by Jérôme Policand.)	Am	6
(France) Debard Automobiles by Racetivity	22	(France) Jérôme Policand	Am	6
(France) Debard Automobiles by Racetivity	31	(France) Louis Meric	PA	1–3
(France) Debard Automobiles by Racetivity	81	(France) Éric Debard	Am	All
(France) 2B Autosport	4	(France) Florian Latorre	P	All
(France) 2B Autosport	10	(France) Karl Vandewoestyne	PA	All
(France) Racing Technology	5	(France) Frédéric Lacore	Am	All
(France) Racing Technology	7	(France) Jérôme Boullery	PA	All
(France) Racing Technology	11	(France) Malo Bolliet	P R	All
(France) Racing Technology	19	(France) Laurent Cochard	Am	2, 4
(France) ABM	6	(France) Dylan Estre	P R	3–4, 6
(France) ABM	21	(France) Marc Guillot	PA	All
(France) ABM	66	(France) Gilles Colombani	Am	All
(France) ABM	74	(France) Marvin Klein	P	1–5
(France) ABM	74	(France) Victor Bernier	P	6
(France) GP Racing Team	8	(France) Charles Roussanne	P R	All
(France) GP Racing Team	23	(France) Dylan Estre	P R	1–2
(France) GP Racing Team	26	(France) Cyril Saleilles	Am	All
(France) GP Racing Team	88	(France) Loïc Teire	Am	1–4
(France) GP Racing Team	88	(France) Michael Blanchemain	Am	5
(France) GP Racing Team	88	(France) Florian Teillais	Am	6
(France) GP Racing Team	92	(France) Christophe Lapierre	PA	6
(France) Martinet by Alméras (Note: Cars No. 16 and 17 entered as Martinet by Alméras and cars No. 15 and 67 entered as Pierre Martinet by Alméras.)	15	(France) Macéo Capietto	P R	All
(France) Martinet by Alméras	16	(France) Paul Cauhaupé	P	All
(France) Martinet by Alméras	17	(Andorra) Enzo Joulié	P	All
(France) Martinet by Alméras	67	(France) Henry Hassid	Am	All
(Estonia) Quanloop EST1 Racing	27	(Cyprus) Tio Ellinas	P	1–2
(Estonia) Quanloop EST1 Racing	27	(Netherlands) Paul Meijer	P	3, 5
(Estonia) Quanloop EST1 Racing	27	(Finland) Mikko Laine	Am	6
(Estonia) Quanloop EST1 Racing	28	(Estonia) Alexander Reimann	P	1–3, 5–6
(Portugal) LOB Motorsport	68	(Portugal) Manuel Alves	P R	All
(Portugal) LOB Motorsport	95	(Portugal) Gonçalo Fernandes	P R	All
(Portugal) LOB Motorsport	97	(Portugal) Vasco Barros	PA	5
(France) Chazel Technologie Course	99	(France) Jean-Paul Dominici	Am	2

Icon	Class
P	Pro Cup
PA	Pro-Am Cup
Am	Am Cup
R	Rookie
	Guest Starter

== Calendar ==
Round	Circuit	Date	Map of circuit locations
1	Circuit de Barcelona-Catalunya, Montmeló, Spain	10–12 April	2026 Porsche Carrera Cup France is located in Europe
2	Dijon-Prenois, Prenois, France	15–17 May	2026 Porsche Carrera Cup France is located in Europe
3	Circuit de Spa-Francorchamps, Stavelot, Belgium	19–21 June	2026 Porsche Carrera Cup France is located in Europe
4	Circuit de Nevers Magny-Cours, Magny-Cours, France	31 July–2 August	2026 Porsche Carrera Cup France is located in Europe
5	Circuit Zandvoort, Zandvoort, Netherlands	18–20 September	2026 Porsche Carrera Cup France is located in Europe
6	Circuit Paul Ricard, Le Castellet, France	9–11 October	2026 Porsche Carrera Cup France is located in Europe

== Race results ==
Round		Circuit	Pole position	Overall winner	Pro-Am winner	Am winner	Rookie winner
1	R1	(Spain) Circuit de Barcelona-Catalunya	(France) Marvin Klein	(France) Marvin Klein	(France) Louis Meric	(France) Henry Hassid	(France) Macéo Capietto
1	R2	(Spain) Circuit de Barcelona-Catalunya	(France) Marvin Klein	(France) Macéo Capietto	(France) Jérôme Boullery	(France) Henry Hassid	(France) Macéo Capietto
2	R3	(France) Dijon-Prenois	(France) Paul Cauhaupé	(France) Marvin Klein	(France) Marc Guillot	(France) Éric Debard	(France) Macéo Capietto
2	R4	(France) Dijon-Prenois	(France) Paul Cauhaupé	(Andorra) Enzo Joulié (Note: Macéo Capietto was the first driver to cross the finish line, but received a 5 second time penalty for track limits. Paul Cauhaupé and Marvin Klein, who crossed the finish line in second and third respectively, also received 5 second time penalties for track limits. Enzo Joulié, who was the fourth driver to cross the finish line, thus inherited the win.)	(France) Karl Vandewoestyne	(France) Éric Debard	(France) Macéo Capietto
3	R5	(Belgium) Circuit de Spa-Francorchamps	(France) Marvin Klein	(France) Marvin Klein	(France) Jérôme Boullery	(France) Frédéric Lacore	(France) Macéo Capietto
3	R6	(Belgium) Circuit de Spa-Francorchamps	(France) Marvin Klein	(France) Marvin Klein	(France) Marc Guillot	(France) Henry Hassid	(France) Macéo Capietto
4	R7	(France) Circuit de Nevers Magny-Cours	(France) Paul Cauhaupé	(France) Paul Cauhaupé	(France) Marc Guillot	(France) Cyril Saleilles	(France) Macéo Capietto
4	R8	(France) Circuit de Nevers Magny-Cours	(France) Paul Cauhaupé	(France) Paul Cauhaupé	(France) Marc Guillot	(France) Éric Debard	(France) Malo Bolliet
5	R9	(Netherlands) Circuit Zandvoort	(France) Marvin Klein	(France) Marvin Klein	(France) Karl Vandewoestyne	(France) Gilles Colombani	(Portugal) Manuel Alves
5	R10	(Netherlands) Circuit Zandvoort	(France) Paul Cauhaupé	(France) Paul Cauhaupé	(France) Jérôme Boullery	(France) Henry Hassid	(France) Macéo Capietto
6	R11	(France) Circuit Paul Ricard	(France) Paul Cauhaupé	(France) Paul Cauhaupé	(France) Karl Vandewoestyne	(France) Henry Hassid	(France) Macéo Capietto
6	R12	(France) Circuit Paul Ricard	(France) Paul Cauhaupé	(France) Paul Cauhaupé	(France) Karl Vandewoestyne	(France) Florian Teillais	(France) Macéo Capietto

== Championship standings ==
=== Scoring system ===
Position	**1st**	**2nd**	**3rd**	**4th**	**5th**	**6th**	**7th**	**8th**	**9th**	**10th**	**11th**	**12th**	**13th**	**14th**	**15th**	Pole	FL
Points	25	20	17	14	12	10	9	8	7	6	5	4	3	2	1	1	1

=== Overall ===
Pos	Driver	Team	(Spain) BAR		(France) DIJ		(Belgium) SPA		(France) MAG		(Netherlands) ZAN		(France) LEC		Pts
Pos	Driver	Team	R1	R2	R3	R4	R5	R6	R7	R8	R9	R10	R11	R12	Pts
1	(France) Marvin Klein	(France) ABM	**1**	**2**	1	5	**1**	**1**	2	2	**1**	3			226
2	(France) Paul Cauhaupé	(France) Martinet by Alméras	Ret	11	**7**	**4**	2	2	**1**	**1**	2	**1**	**1**	**1**	223
3	(France) Macéo Capietto	(France) Pierre Martinet by Alméras	4	1	2	3	4	3	5	10	15	2	3	2	187
4	(Andorra) Enzo Joulié	(France) Martinet by Alméras	2	4	3	1	11	16	6	5	9	8	5	6	144
5	(France) Charles Roussanne	(France) GP Racing Team	3	5	10	8	3	6	3	17	3	4	7	4	142
6	(France) Florian Latorre	(France) 2B Autosport	DSQ	3	4	2	13	7	4	3	6	5	6	8	137
7	(France) Hugo Chevalier	(France) Debard Automobiles by Racetivity	5	13	5	9	6	5	7	4	5	7	4	3	135
8	(France) Malo Bolliet	(France) Racing Technology	7	6	6	6	5	13	9	6	12	Ret	8	7	94
9	(Portugal) Manuel Alves	(Portugal) LOB Motorsport	8	7	13	17	15	8	10	9	8	10	12	10	69
10	(France) Karl Vandewoestyne	(France) 2B Autosport	12	10	9	7	10	18	14	11	7	12	9	9	69
11	(France) Jérôme Boullery	(France) Racing Technology	Ret	8	18	11	7	10	11	14	10	11	15	11	55
12	(France) Marc Guillot	(France) ABM	Ret	12	8	Ret	19	9	8	7	13	13	14	12	51
13	(Estonia) Alexander Reimann	(Estonia) Quanloop EST1 Racing	Ret	WD	11	Ret	12	12			4	6	10	16	46
14	(Portugal) Gonçalo Fernandes	(Portugal) LOB Motorsport	6	14	14	21	21	20	13	8	11	14	11	13	43
15	(France) Dylan Estre	(France) GP Racing Team	10	9	15	Ret	16	14	12	Ret			13	14	27
16	(France) Louis Meric	(France) Debard Automobiles by Racetivity	11	DSQ	12	10	8	21							23
17	(Netherlands) Paul Meijer (Note: Meijer was ineligible to score points in round 5.)	(Estonia) Quanloop EST1 Racing					9	4			Ret	9			21
18	(France) Henry Hassid	(France) Pierre Martinet by Alméras	13	16	17	15	23	11	17	Ret	17	15	17	21	13
19	(France) Éric Debard	(France) Debard Automobiles by Racetivity	14	17	16	12	20	15	18	12	16	16	22	18	13
20	(Cyprus) Tio Ellinas	(Estonia) Quanloop EST1 Racing	9	15	Ret	16									9
21	(France) Frédéric Lacore	(France) Racing Technology	17	18	21	14	14	23	20	13	20	21	20	20	8
22	(France) Gilles Colombani	(France) ABM	Ret	Ret	24	20	17	17	16	15	14	17	23	24	3
23	(France) Cyril Saleilles	(France) GP Racing Team	16	Ret	22	18	18	19	15	16	19	18	21	22	1
24	(France) Loïc Teire	(France) GP Racing Team	15	Ret	23	19	22	22	21	DNS					1
Guest drivers ineligible to score points
—	(France) Victor Bernier	(France) ABM											2	5	–
—	(France) Laurent Cochard	(France) Racing Technology			19	13			19	Ret					–
—	(France) Christophe Lapierre	(France) GP Racing Team											16	15	–
—	(France) Florian Tellais	(France) GP Racing Team											18	17	–
—	(Portugal) Vasco Barros	(Portugal) LOB Motorsport									18	19			–
—	(France) Jérôme Policand	(France) Debard Automobiles by Racetivity											19	19	–
—	(France) Jean-Paul Dominici	(France) Chazel Technologie Course			20	22									–
—	(France) Michael Blanchemain	(France) GP Racing Team									21	20			–
—	(Finland) Mikko Laine	(Estonia) Quanloop EST1 Racing											Ret	23	–
—	(Switzerland) Philippe Giauque	(France) Debard Automobiles by Racetivity											WD	WD	–
Pos	Driver	Team	(Spain) BAR		(France) DIJ		(Belgium) SPA		(France) MAG		(Netherlands) ZAN		(France) LEC		Pts

Colour	Result
Gold	Winner
Silver	Second place
Bronze	Third place
Green	Points classification
Blue	Non-points classification
Blue	Non-classified finish (NC)
Purple	Retired, not classified (Ret)
Red	Did not qualify (DNQ)
Red	Did not pre-qualify (DNPQ)
Black	Disqualified (DSQ)
White	Did not start (DNS)
White	Withdrew (WD)
White	Race cancelled (C)
Blank	Did not practice (DNP)
Blank	Did not arrive (DNA)
Blank	Excluded (EX)

**Bold** – Pole

Italics – Fastest Lap

† — Did not finish, but classified

=== Pro-Am ===
Pos	Driver	Team	(Spain) BAR		(France) DIJ		(Belgium) SPA		(France) MAG		(Netherlands) ZAN		(France) LEC		Pts
Pos	Driver	Team	R1	R2	R3	R4	R5	R6	R7	R8	R9	R10	R11	R12	Pts
1	(France) Karl Vandewoestyne	(France) 2B Autosport	2	2	2	**1**	3	3	3	2	**1**	**2**	1	1	258
2	(France) Jérôme Boullery	(France) Racing Technology	Ret	**1**	4	3	**1**	2	2	3	2	1	**3**	**2**	229
3	(France) Marc Guillot	(France) ABM	Ret	3	**1**	Ret	4	**1**	**1**	**1**	3	3	2	3	209
4	(France) Louis Meric	(France) Debard Automobiles by Racetivity	**1**	DSQ	3	2	2	4							97
Guest drivers ineligible to score points
—	(France) Christophe Lapierre	(France) GP Racing Team											4	4	–
—	(Portugal) Vasco Barros	(Portugal) LOB Motorsport									4	4			–
Pos	Driver	Team	(Spain) BAR		(France) DIJ		(Belgium) SPA		(France) MAG		(Netherlands) ZAN		(France) LEC		Pts

=== Am ===
Pos	Driver	Team	(Spain) BAR		(France) DIJ		(Belgium) SPA		(France) MAG		(Netherlands) ZAN		(France) LEC		Pts
Pos	Driver	Team	R1	R2	R3	R4	R5	R6	R7	R8	R9	R10	R11	R12	Pts
1	(France) Henry Hassid	(France) Pierre Martinet by Alméras	**1**	**1**	**2**	**4**	(6)	**1**	3	(5)	**3**	**1**	1	5	225
2	(France) Éric Debard	(France) Debard Automobiles by Racetivity	2	2	1	1	**4**	2	(**4**)	**1**	2	2	(**6**)	**2**	223
3	(France) Frédéric Lacore	(France) Racing Technology	(5)	3	5	3	1	(6)	6	2	5	6	4	4	176
4	(France) Gilles Colombani	(France) ABM	Ret	Ret	8	7	2	3	2	3	1	3	7	8	161
5	(France) Cyril Saleilles	(France) GP Racing Team	(4)	Ret	6	5	3	4	1	4	4	4	5	6	158
6	(France) Loïc Teire	(France) GP Racing Team	3	Ret	7	6	5	5	7	DNS					75
Guest drivers ineligible to score points
—	(France) Florian Tellais	(France) GP Racing Team											2	1 (Note: Florian Tellais set the fastest lap in the Am class in Race 2 at Paul Ricard, but he was ineligible to score points, so the fastest lap point was awarded to Éric Debard.)	–
—	(France) Laurent Cochard	(France) Racing Technology			3	2			5	Ret					–
—	(France) Jérôme Policand	(France) Debard Automobiles by Racetivity											3	3	–
—	(France) Jean-Paul Dominici	(France) Chazel Technologie Course			4	8									–
—	(France) Michael Blanchemain	(France) GP Racing Team									6	5			–
—	(Finland) Mikko Laine	(Estonia) Quanloop EST1 Racing											Ret	7	–
—	(Switzerland) Philippe Giauque	(France) Debard Automobiles by Racetivity											WD	WD	–
Pos	Driver	Team	(Spain) BAR		(France) DIJ		(Belgium) SPA		(France) MAG		(Netherlands) ZAN		(France) LEC		Pts

=== Rookie ===
Pos	Driver	Team	(Spain) BAR		(France) DIJ		(Belgium) SPA		(France) MAG		(Netherlands) ZAN		(France) LEC		Pts
Pos	Driver	Team	R1	R2	R3	R4	R5	R6	R7	R8	R9	R10	R11	R12	Pts
1	(France) Macéo Capietto	(France) Martinet by Alméras	**4**	**1**	**2**	**3**	**4**	**3**	**5**	**10**	**15**	**2**	**3**	**2**	210
2	(France) Malo Bolliet	(France) Racing Technology	7	6	6	6	5	13	9	6	12	Ret	8	7	94
3	(Portugal) Manuel Alves	(Portugal) LOB Motorsport	8	7	13	17	15	8	10	9	8	10	12	10	69
4	(Portugal) Gonçalo Fernandes	(Portugal) LOB Motorsport	6	14	14	21	21	20	13	8	11	14	11	13	43
5	(France) Dylan Estre	(France) GP Racing Team	10	9	15	Ret	16	14	12	Ret			13	14	27
Pos	Driver	Team	(Spain) BAR		(France) DIJ		(Belgium) SPA		(France) MAG		(Netherlands) ZAN		(France) LEC		Pts

=== Teams ===
Pos	Team	Pts
1	(France) Martinet by Alméras	367
2	(France) ABM	284
3	(France) 2B Autosport	206
4	(France) Pierre Martinet by Alméras	200
5	(France) Debard Automobiles by Racetivity	162
6	(France) GP Racing Team	159
7	(Portugal) LOB Motorsport	111
8	(Estonia) Quanloop EST1 Racing	76
Pos	Team	Pts
