= 2023 TTE Formula Renault Cup =

Edition of a motorsport program

The 2023 Trophee Tourisme Endurance - Formula Renault Cup was the third season of the championship. The Formula Renault series was one class of the Trophee Tourisme Endurance, a program started in 2009 with approval of the FFSA comprising multiple endurance and sprint championships across different classes of motor racing.

Only Classes A and A1 saw entries into the 2023 season. Lamo Racing Car driver Jonathan Correrella clinched both the overall and the rookie championship at the penultimate round, as his two closest competitors Ivan Klymenko and Danny Buntschu both did not contest the full season. Correrella's teammate Serge Coperchini won the gentleman drivers' title.

== Teams and drivers ==
All drivers competed using Formula Renault machinery. Competitors were split into two different classes depending on the cars' age and performance. There also were separate rookie and gentleman classifications.

Team	No.	Driver	Status	Rounds
Class A
Team E4Y / SCC	3	(France) Jérémy Clavaud		2
Team E4Y / SCC	39	(France) Corentin Guth		1–4
Fred Team	4	(France) Frédéric Boillot	G	4
Prudent Compétition	5	(France) Adeline Prudent		1–2, 4–5
Seymaz Moteur	6	(France) Eric Vuagnat	G	5
Sport Promotion	6	(France) Eric Vuagnat	G	4
Sport Promotion	62	(Switzerland) Christophe Hurni	G	4
Fievre Compétition	7	(France) Rémy Fievre		7
STAC	8	(France) Youssuf Ziani		2
Lamo Racing Car	10	(Switzerland) Danny Buntschu	R	1–5, 7
Lamo Racing Car	12	(Ukraine) Ivan Klymenko	R	1–4
Lamo Racing Car	15	(France) Thierry Aimard	G	2, 4–7
Lamo Racing Car	24	(France) Serge Coperchini	G	All
Lamo Racing Car	33	(France) Thierry Malhomme	G	2–7
Lamo Racing Car	46	(France) Alain Rebus	G	1–2
Lamo Racing Car	56	(France) Sebastien Geny Gros		7
Lamo Racing Car	68	(United Arab Emirates) Alain Bucher	G	3–7
Lamo Racing Car	74	(France) Jonathan Correrella	R	All
Lamo Racing Car	99	(Switzerland) Théo Vaucher	R	1–4
LR Promotion	13	(France) Antoine Robert		1
Hervé David Racing	16	(France) Alexandra Herve	R	All
ROSSEL Compétition	21	(France) Maxime Jouen		2–6
Morel Auto Racing	26	(France) Tristan Morel		3–5
Event 4 You	39	(France) Victor Bernier	R	7
Tordeux Sport	57	(France) Mathéo Mendes	R	7
MB Motorsport Expérience	96	(France) Maxenche Benech		3
Class A1
Sornicle Team	47	(France) Jérome Sornicle	G	7

== Race calendar ==
The 2023 calendar was announced on 4 October 2022 and consisted of the same seven circuits as the 2022 season. A pre-season test was also held at Circuit de Nevers Magny-Cours on 24 February. All rounds were held in France.

Round		Circuit	Date	Support bill	Map of circuit locations
1	R1	Circuit du Val de Vienne, Le Vigeant	1 April	Funyo Sport Proto Endurance Cup; TTE race weekend	2023 TTE Formula Renault Cup is located in France
1	R2	Circuit du Val de Vienne, Le Vigeant	2 April	Funyo Sport Proto Endurance Cup; TTE race weekend	2023 TTE Formula Renault Cup is located in France
2	R1	Circuit de Lédenon, Lédenon	6 May	Radical Cup France; TTE race weekend	2023 TTE Formula Renault Cup is located in France
2	R2	Circuit de Lédenon, Lédenon	7 May	Radical Cup France; TTE race weekend	2023 TTE Formula Renault Cup is located in France
3	R1	Circuit Paul Ricard, Le Castellet	17 June	Funyo Sport Proto Endurance Cup; TTE race weekend	2023 TTE Formula Renault Cup is located in France
3	R2	Circuit Paul Ricard, Le Castellet	18 June	Funyo Sport Proto Endurance Cup; TTE race weekend	2023 TTE Formula Renault Cup is located in France
4	R1	Circuit de Dijon-Prenois, Prenois	8 July	Funyo Sport Proto Endurance Cup; TTE race weekend	2023 TTE Formula Renault Cup is located in France
4	R2	Circuit de Dijon-Prenois, Prenois	9 July	Funyo Sport Proto Endurance Cup; TTE race weekend	2023 TTE Formula Renault Cup is located in France
5	R1	Circuit de Nevers Magny-Cours, Magny-Cours	23 September	Radical Cup France; TTE race weekend	2023 TTE Formula Renault Cup is located in France
5	R2	Circuit de Nevers Magny-Cours, Magny-Cours	24 September	Radical Cup France; TTE race weekend	2023 TTE Formula Renault Cup is located in France
6	R1	Circuit Paul Armagnac, Nogaro	21 October	TTE race weekend	2023 TTE Formula Renault Cup is located in France
6	R2	Circuit Paul Armagnac, Nogaro	22 October	TTE race weekend	2023 TTE Formula Renault Cup is located in France
7	R1	Bugatti Circuit, Le Mans	11 November	TTE race weekend	2023 TTE Formula Renault Cup is located in France
7	R2	Bugatti Circuit, Le Mans	12 November	TTE race weekend	2023 TTE Formula Renault Cup is located in France

== Race results ==
Round		Circuit	Pole position	Fastest lap	Class A winner	Class A Rookie winner	Class A Gentleman winner	Class A1 winner
1	R1	Circuit du Val de Vienne	(France) Jonathan Correrella	(France) Jonathan Correrella	(Switzerland) Danny Buntschu	(Switzerland) Danny Buntschu	(France) Alain Rebus	no entries
1	R2	Circuit du Val de Vienne	(Switzerland) Danny Buntschu	(Switzerland) Danny Buntschu	(Ukraine) Ivan Klymenko	(Ukraine) Ivan Klymenko	(France) Alain Rebus	no entries
2	R1	Circuit de Lédenon	(France) Jonathan Correrella	(Ukraine) Ivan Klymenko	(France) Jonathan Correrella	(France) Jonathan Correrella	(France) Alain Rebus	no entries
2	R2	Circuit de Lédenon	(France) Jonathan Correrella	(France) Jonathan Correrella	(France) Corentin Guth	(France) Jonathan Correrella	(France) Alain Rebus	no entries
3	R1	Circuit Paul Ricard	(Ukraine) Ivan Klymenko	(Ukraine) Ivan Klymenko	(Ukraine) Ivan Klymenko	(Ukraine) Ivan Klymenko	(France) Serge Coperchini	no entries
3	R2	Circuit Paul Ricard	(Ukraine) Ivan Klymenko	(Ukraine) Ivan Klymenko	(Ukraine) Ivan Klymenko	(Ukraine) Ivan Klymenko	(United Arab Emirates) Alain Bucher	no entries
4	R1	Circuit de Dijon-Prenois	(France) Jonathan Correrella	(France) Jonathan Correrella	(France) Jonathan Correrella	(France) Jonathan Correrella	(Switzerland) Christophe Hurni	no entries
4	R2	Circuit de Dijon-Prenois	(France) Jonathan Correrella	(Ukraine) Ivan Klymenko	(France) Jonathan Correrella	(France) Jonathan Correrella	(Switzerland) Christophe Hurni	no entries
5	R1	Circuit de Nevers Magny-Cours	(France) Jonathan Correrella	(France) Jonathan Correrella	(France) Jonathan Correrella	(France) Jonathan Correrella	(France) Thierry Malhomme	no entries
5	R2	Circuit de Nevers Magny-Cours	(Switzerland) Danny Buntschu	(France) Jonathan Correrella	(France) Jonathan Correrella	(France) Jonathan Correrella	(France) Thierry Aimard	no entries
6	R1	Circuit Paul Armagnac	(France) Jonathan Correrella	(France) Jonathan Correrella	(France) Jonathan Correrella	(France) Jonathan Correrella	(France) Serge Coperchini	no entries
6	R2	Circuit Paul Armagnac	(France) Jonathan Correrella	(France) Jonathan Correrella	(France) Jonathan Correrella	(France) Jonathan Correrella	(United Arab Emirates) Alain Bucher	no entries
7	R1	Bugatti Circuit	(France) Jonathan Correrella	(France) Victor Bernier	(France) Victor Bernier	(France) Victor Bernier	(France) Serge Coperchini	(France) Jérome Sornicle
7	R2	Bugatti Circuit	(France) Victor Bernier	(France) Victor Bernier	(Switzerland) Danny Buntschu	(Switzerland) Danny Buntschu	(France) Thierry Aimard	(France) Jérome Sornicle

== Standings ==
=== Scoring system ===
Points are awarded per class, to every driver starting the race, according to the following structure:

Position	1st	2nd	3rd	4th	5th	6th	7th	8th	9th	10th	11th	12th	13th	14th	15th
Points	150	130	110	100	90	80	75	70	65	60	55	50	45	40	35
Position	16th	17th	18th	19th	20th	21st	22nd	23rd	24th	25th	26th	27th	28th	29th	30th+
Points	33	31	29	27	25	23	21	19	17	15	13	11	9	7	5

Each driver counts their 12 best results.

=== Class A standings ===
Pos	Driver	VDV		LED		LEC		DIJ		MAG		NOG		LEM		Pts
Pos	Driver	R1	R2	R1	R2	R1	R2	R1	R2	R1	R2	R1	R2	R1	R2	Pts
Overall standings
1	(France) Jonathan Correrella	(9)	3	1	2	2	2	1	1	1	1	1	1	2	(8)	1700
2	(Switzerland) Danny Buntschu	1	2	4	4	3	3	3	12	2	2			3	1	1400
3	(France) Alexandra Herve	6	8	(9)	8	6	6	(13)	6	4	4	3	4	5	5	1090
4	(Ukraine) Ivan Klymenko	2	1	2	3	1	1	2	2							1080
5	(France) Serge Coperchini	8	7	(11)	(11)	8	9	10	9	9	7	2	3	6	7	975
6	(United Arab Emirates) Alain Bucher					11	7	7	10	6	9	4	2	7	6	830
7	(France) Thierry Malhomme			12	14	9	11	12	8	5	8	5	5	9	11	825
8	(France) Adeline Prudent	5	5	6	10			4	3	3	3					750
9	(France) Thierry Aimard			DNS	12			11	11	7	5	6	6	10	3	690
10	(France) Corentin Guth	4	10	3	1	12	12	14	DNS							560
11	(France) Maxime Jouen			8	9	7	8	6	13	11	10	WD	WD			530
12	(Switzerland) Théo Vaucher	10	9	5	6	4	4	WD	WD							495
13	(France) Tristan Morel					10	10	9	7	8	DNS					330
14	(France) Alain Rebus	7	6	10	5											305
15	(France) Eric Vuagnat							8	5	10	6					300
16	(France) Antoine Robert	3	4													210
17	(Switzerland) Christophe Hurni							5	4							190
18	(France) Maxenche Benech					5	5									180
19	(France) Jérémy Clavaud			7	7											150
20	(France) Youssuf Ziani			13	13											90
—	(France) Frédéric Boillot							WD	WD							—
Guest drivers ineligible to score points
—	(France) Victor Bernier													1	2	—
—	(France) Sebastien Geny Gros													8	4	—
—	(France) Rémy Fievre													4	9	—
—	(France) Mathéo Mendes													11	10	—
Rookie standings
1	(France) Jonathan Correrella	(4)	(3)	1	1	2	2	1	1	1	1	1	1	1	3	1720
2	(Switzerland) Danny Buntschu	1	2	3	3	3	3	3	4	2	2			2	1	1470
3	(France) Alexandra Herve	3	4	(5)	(5)	5	5	4	3	3	3	2	2	3	2	1320
4	(Ukraine) Ivan Klymenko	2	1	2	2	1	1	2	2							1100
5	(Switzerland) Théo Vaucher	5	5	4	4	4	4	WD	WD							580
Gentleman class standings
1	(France) Serge Coperchini	2	2	2	2	1	2	(4)	(4)	4	3	1	2	1	3	1550
2	(France) Thierry Malhomme			3	4	2	3	6	3	1	4	3	3	3	4	1320
3	(United Arab Emirates) Alain Bucher					3	1	2	5	2	5	2	1	2	2	1240
4	(France) Thierry Aimard			DNS	3			5	6	3	1	4	4	4	1	990
5	(France) Alain Rebus	1	1	1	1											600
6	(France) Eric Vuagnat							3	2	5	2					460
7	(Switzerland) Christophe Hurni							1	1							300
—	(France) Frédéric Boillot							WD	WD							—
Pos	Driver	R1	R2	R1	R2	R1	R2	R1	R2	R1	R2	R1	R2	R1	R2	Pts
Pos	Driver	VDV		LED		LEC		DIJ		MAG		NOG		LEM		Pts

=== Class A1 standings ===
Pos	Driver	VDV		LED		LEC		DIJ		MAG		NOG		LEM		Pts
Pos	Driver	R1	R2	R1	R2	R1	R2	R1	R2	R1	R2	R1	R2	R1	R2	Pts
Overall standings
Guest drivers ineligible to score points
—	(France) Jérome Sornicle													1	1	—
Pos	Driver	R1	R2	R1	R2	R1	R2	R1	R2	R1	R2	R1	R2	R1	R2	Pts
Pos	Driver	VDV		LED		LEC		DIJ		MAG		NOG		LEM		Pts
