= 2025 Porsche Supercup =

33rd season of Porsche Supercup

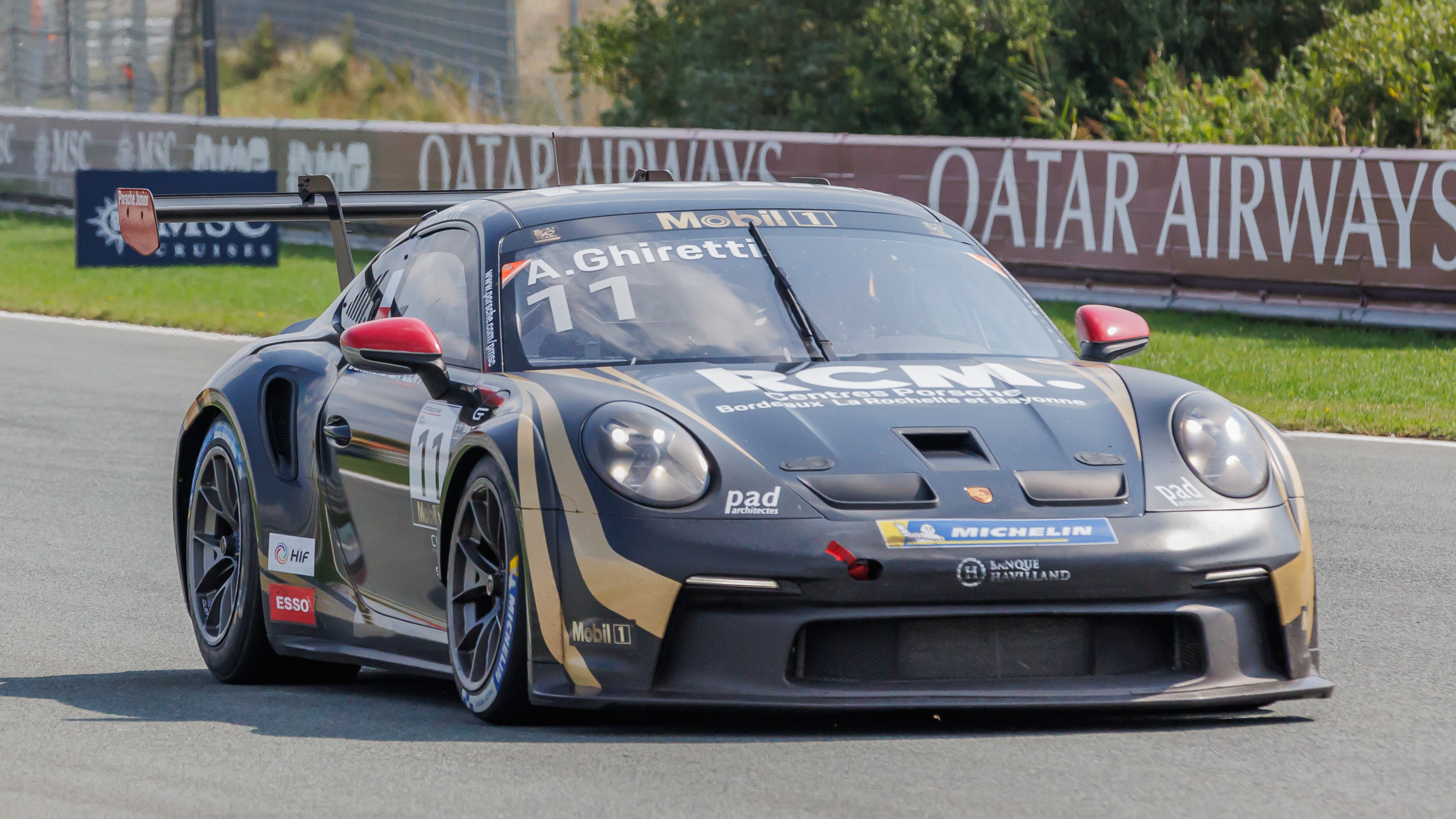
Alessandro Ghiretti won the Drivers' Championship driving for Schumacher CLRT.

The 2025 Porsche Mobil 1 Supercup was the 33rd Porsche Supercup season, a one-make stock car racing series sanctioned by Porsche Motorsports GmbH in the world. It began on 16 May at Imola Circuit, Italy and ended on 7 September at the Autodromo Nazionale di Monza, Italy, after eight races, all of which are support events for the 2025 Formula One World Championship.

2024 champion Larry ten Voorde retired from the series for 2025, with fellow Dutchman Flynt Schuring taking over the No. 12 Schumacher CLRT entry.

The championship was won by French driver Alessandro Ghiretti, driving for the Schumacher CLRT team. Ghiretti finished 17 points ahead of BWT Lechner Racing driver Robert de Haan and 27 points ahead of his Schumacher CLRT teammate, Schuring.

Schuring comfortably won the rookie championship ahead of Janne Stiak, while Schumacher CLRT won the teams championship with a 51 point gap to BWT Lechner Racing.

== Teams and drivers ==
Team	No.	Drivers	Class	Rounds
(Austria) BWT Lechner Racing	1	(Netherlands) Robert de Haan		All
(Austria) BWT Lechner Racing	2	(France) Marvin Klein		All
(Germany) Proton Huber Competition	3	(Germany) Theo Oeverhaus		All
(Germany) Proton Huber Competition	4	(Netherlands) Jaap van Lagen		All
(Germany) Proton Huber Competition	5	(United Kingdom) Gustav Burton		All
(Germany) Proton Huber Competition	6	(Hong Kong) Dylan Yip	G	1
(Germany) Proton Huber Competition	6	(Germany) Kai Pfister	G	2
(Germany) Proton Huber Competition	6	(Estonia) Alexander Reimann	G	3
(Germany) Proton Huber Competition	6	(Czech Republic) Jakub Knoll	G	4
(Germany) Proton Huber Competition	6	(Sweden) Daniel Ros	G	7
(Germany) Proton Huber Competition	6	(Austria) Horst Felix Felbermayr	G	8
(Italy) Dinamic Motorsport	7	(Italy) Aldo Festante		1, 4–8
(Italy) Dinamic Motorsport	7	(Italy) Gianmarco Quaresmini	G	2–3
(Italy) Dinamic Motorsport	8	(Netherlands) Dirk Schouten	R	All
(Italy) Dinamic Motorsport	9	(Italy) Pietro Delli Guanti	R	1–6
(Italy) Dinamic Motorsport	9	(Italy) Filippo Fant	G	8
(Italy) Dinamic Motorsport	33	(Italy) Eugenio Pisani	G	4
(France) Schumacher CLRT	11	(France) Alessandro Ghiretti		All
(France) Schumacher CLRT	12	(Netherlands) Flynt Schuring	R	All
(Spain) Hadeca Racing	13	(Denmark) Anders Fjordbach	G	1–2
(Spain) Hadeca Racing	13	(Spain) Borja García	G	3
(Spain) Hadeca Racing	13	(Netherlands) Niels Langeveld	G	7
(Spain) Hadeca Racing	13	(Ukraine) Oleksandr Dobik	G	8
(Spain) Hadeca Racing	14	(Spain) Mikel Azcona		All
(France) Martinet by Alméras	15	(United Kingdom) Aaron Mason		All
(France) Martinet by Alméras	16	(France) Mathys Jaubert		1–2, 4–8
(France) Martinet by Alméras	16	(France) Paul Cauhaupé	G	3
(France) Martinet by Alméras	17	(Andorra) Frank Porté Ruiz	G	1–2, 4, 6–7
(France) Martinet by Alméras	17	(Andorra) Enzo Joulié	G	3
(France) Martinet by Alméras	17	(Belgium) Benjamin Paque	G	5
(France) Martinet by Alméras	17	(France) Paul Cauhaupé	G	8
(Italy) Ombra S.R.L.	18	(South Africa) Keagan Masters		All
(Italy) Ombra S.R.L.	19	(United States) Anthony Imperato		1–3
(Italy) Ombra S.R.L.	19	(Argentina) Luciano Martínez	G	4–8
(Italy) Ombra S.R.L.	20	(Italy) Francesco Braschi		All
(Netherlands) GP Elite	21	(Germany) Jonas Greif	G	1–2, 4, 8
(Netherlands) GP Elite	21	(Netherlands) Hjelte Hoffner	G	3, 7
(Netherlands) GP Elite	21	(Australia) Adrian Flack	G	6
(Netherlands) GP Elite	22	(Netherlands) Wouter Boerekamps		All
(Netherlands) GP Elite	23	(Australia) Samer Shahin		All
(Netherlands) GP Elite	24	(Netherlands) Kas Haverkort		1–6
(Netherlands) GP Elite	24	(Germany) Jonas Greif	G	7
(Netherlands) GP Elite	24	(Netherlands) Hjelte Hoffner	G	8
(Netherlands) GP Elite	25	(Israel) Ariel Levi		All
(Netherlands) GP Elite	26	(Netherlands) Huub van Eijndhoven		All
(Netherlands) GP Elite	34	(Netherlands) Nigel Schoonderwoerd	G	7
(Italy) Target Competition	27	(Germany) Alexander Tauscher		All
(Italy) Target Competition	28	(Germany) Sebastian Freymuth	G	1–2, 4
(Italy) Target Competition	28	(Netherlands) Nathan Schaap	G	3, 7–8
(Italy) Target Competition	29	(Germany) Janne Stiak	R	All
(Italy) Target Competition	35	(Netherlands) Senna van Soelen	G	7
(Italy) The Driving Experiences SRL	30	(Austria) Horst Felix Felbermayr	G	1, 4
(Italy) The Driving Experiences SRL	31	(Italy) Francesco Maria Fenici	G	1, 5
(Italy) The Driving Experiences SRL	32	(Italy) Diego Bertonelli	G	1, 4
(Italy) The Driving Experiences SRL	32	(Italy) Giorgio Amati	G	5

Icon	Class
PA	Pro-Am Cup
R	Rookie
G	Guest

- Gian Luca Tüccaroğlu was scheduled to compete for Hadeca Racing, but did not appear at any rounds.

== Race calendar and results ==
Round	Circuit	Date	Pole position	Fastest lap	Winning driver	Winning team
1	(Italy) Imola Circuit, Imola	16–18 May	(Germany) Theo Oeverhaus	(Netherlands) Flynt Schuring	(Germany) Theo Oeverhaus	(Germany) Proton Huber Competition
2	Circuit de Monaco, Monte Carlo	22–25 May	(Netherlands) Robert de Haan	(Netherlands) Robert de Haan	(Netherlands) Robert de Haan	(Austria) BWT Lechner Racing
3	(Spain) Circuit de Barcelona-Catalunya, Montmeló	30 May–1 June	(Netherlands) Flynt Schuring	(France) Alessandro Ghiretti	(France) Alessandro Ghiretti	(France) Schumacher CLRT
4	(Austria) Red Bull Ring, Spielberg	27–29 June	(Netherlands) Robert de Haan	(Netherlands) Robert de Haan	(France) Marvin Klein	(Austria) BWT Lechner Racing
5	(Belgium) Circuit de Spa-Francorchamps, Stavelot	25–27 July	(France) Alessandro Ghiretti	(France) Alessandro Ghiretti	(France) Alessandro Ghiretti	(France) Schumacher CLRT
6	(Hungary) Hungaroring, Budapest	1–3 August	(France) Mathys Jaubert	(France) Alessandro Ghiretti	(France) Mathys Jaubert	(France) Martinet by Alméras
7	(Netherlands) Circuit Zandvoort, Zandvoort	29–31 August	(Netherlands) Flynt Schuring	(France) Alessandro Ghiretti	(France) Alessandro Ghiretti	(France) Schumacher CLRT
8	(Italy) Autodromo Nazionale di Monza, Monza	5–7 September	(France) Marvin Klein	(Italy) Francesco Braschi	(Netherlands) Wouter Boerekamps	(Netherlands) GP Elite

== Championship standings ==
=== Scoring system ===
Points were awarded to the top fifteen classified drivers in every race, using the following system:

Position	**1st**	**2nd**	**3rd**	**4th**	**5th**	**6th**	**7th**	**8th**	**9th**	**10th**	**11th**	**12th**	**13th**	**14th**	**15th**	**Ref**
Points	25	20	17	14	12	10	9	8	7	6	5	4	3	2	1	

In order for full points to be awarded, the race winner must complete at least 50% of the scheduled race distance. Half points are awarded if the race winner completes less than 50% of the race distance. In the event of a tie at the conclusion of the championship, a count-back system is used as a tie-breaker, with a driver's/constructor's best result used to decide the standings.

Due to a major accident on the opening lap reducing the number of racing laps down to 4, the second round of the 2025 Championship in Monaco was only eligible for half points.

Rookie drivers must be 25 years of age or younger to compete in the Rookies' Championship.

Guest drivers are ineligible to score points. If a guest driver finishes in first position, the second-placed finisher will receive 25 points. The same goes for every other points scoring position. So if three guest drivers end up placed fourth, fifth and sixth, the seventh-placed finisher will receive fourteen points and so forth - until the eighteenth-placed finisher receives the final point.

=== Drivers' Championship ===
Pos.	Driver	IMO (Italy)	MON (Note: Half points were awarded as less than 50% of the scheduled distance was completed.) (Monaco)	CAT (Spain)	RBR (Austria)	SPA (Belgium)	HUN (Hungary)	ZND (Netherlands)	MNZ (Italy)	Points
1	(France) Alessandro Ghiretti	Ret	3	1	3	**1**	6	1	2	130.5
2	(Netherlands) Robert de Haan	Ret	**1**	2	**2**	3	5	2	4	115.5
3	(Netherlands) Flynt Schuring	5	9	**5**	6	2	2	**3**	10	103.5
4	(France) Marvin Klein	Ret	Ret	3	1	7	7	8	**8**	78
5	(Israel) Ariel Levi	2	8	12	4	4	3	Ret	11	76
6	(Netherlands) Huub van Eijndhoven	6	4	4	9	8	9	11	5	71
7	(Germany) Theo Oeverhaus	**1**	2	9	Ret	13	14	7	6	68
8	(France) Mathys Jaubert	Ret	DNS		5	6	**1**	Ret	3	68
9	(Netherlands) Wouter Boerekamps	Ret	Ret	6	24	9	Ret	4	1	57
10	(Germany) Janne Stiak	9	11	11	7	10	Ret	6	12	46.5
11	(Netherlands) Kas Haverkort	3	Ret	10	11	Ret	4			43
12	(South Africa) Keagan Masters	4	Ret	15	8	16	19†	14	9	38
13	(Spain) Mikel Azcona	7	5	14	10	11	Ret	9	16	36
14	(Netherlands) Jaap van Lagen	8	Ret	16	15	12	Ret	5	Ret	28
15	(Netherlands) Dirk Schouten	11	6	13	13	17	12	Ret	13	25
16	(Germany) Alexander Tauscher	Ret	Ret	8	12	14	Ret	10	19	22
17	(United Kingdom) Gustav Burton	12	7	24	18	15	10	16	Ret	19.5
18	(Italy) Francesco Braschi	Ret	10	19	27	20	8	22	15	13
19	(Italy) Aldo Festante	Ret			14	19	11	19	14	12
20	(Italy) Pietro Delli Guanti	10	12	Ret	19	18	13			11
21	(Australia) Samer Shahin	18	16	25	23	22	15	24	22	4.5
22	(United Kingdom) Aaron Mason	20	15	26	26	21	18	21	21	4
23	(United States) Anthony Imperato	Ret	14	27						1.5
Guest drivers ineligible for points
	(Belgium) Benjamin Paque					5				
	(France) Paul Cauhaupé			7					7	
	(Netherlands) Senna van Soelen							12		
	(Italy) Diego Bertonelli	13			17					
	(Denmark) Anders Fjordbach	Ret	13							
	(Netherlands) Niels Langeveld							13		
	(Germany) Sebastian Freymuth	14	Ret		16					
	(Netherlands) Nathan Schaap			21				15	17	
	(Austria) Horst Felix Felbermayr	15			29				Ret	
	(Andorra) Frank Porté Ruiz	17	17		20		16	23		
	(Germany) Jonas Greif	16	18		21			20	18	
	(Argentina) Luciano Martínez				25	23	17	25	20	
	(Estonia) Alexander Reimann			17						
	(Sweden) Daniel Ros							17		
	(Netherlands) Hjelte Hoffner			20				18	Ret	
	(Italy) Gianmarco Quaresmini		Ret	18						
	(Hong Kong) Dylan Yip	19								
	(Germany) Kai Pfister		19							
	(Australia) Adrian Flack						20†			
	(Italy) Francesco Maria Fenici	21				24				
	(Andorra) Enzo Joulié			22						
	(Italy) Eugenio Pisani				22					
	(Spain) Borja García			23						
	(Ukraine) Oleksandr Dobik								23	
	(Italy) Giorgio Amati					25†				
	(Netherlands) Nigel Schoonderwoerd							26		
	(Czech Republic) Jakub Knoll				28					
	(Italy) Filippo Fant								Ret	
Pos.	Driver	IMO (Italy)	MON (Monaco)	CAT (Spain)	RBR (Austria)	SPA (Belgium)	HUN (Hungary)	ZND (Netherlands)	MNZ (Italy)	Points

Colour	Result
Gold	Winner
Silver	Second place
Bronze	Third place
Green	Points classification
Blue	Non-points classification
Blue	Non-classified finish (NC)
Purple	Retired, not classified (Ret)
Red	Did not qualify (DNQ)
Red	Did not pre-qualify (DNPQ)
Black	Disqualified (DSQ)
White	Did not start (DNS)
White	Withdrew (WD)
White	Race cancelled (C)
Blank	Did not practice (DNP)
Blank	Did not arrive (DNA)
Blank	Excluded (EX)

**Bold** – Pole
Italics – Fastest Lap

Notes

† – Driver did not finish the race, but were classified as they completed over 75% of the race distance.

=== Rookies' Championship ===
Pos.	Driver	IMO (Italy)	MON (Note: Half points were awarded as less than 50% of the scheduled distance was completed.) (Monaco)	CAT (Spain)	RBR (Austria)	SPA (Belgium)	HUN (Hungary)	ZND (Netherlands)	MNZ (Italy)	Points
1	(Netherlands) Flynt Schuring	5	9	5	6	2	2	3	10	103.5
2	(Germany) Janne Stiak	9	11	11	7	10	Ret	6	12	46.5
3	(Netherlands) Dirk Schouten	11	6	13	13	17	12	Ret	13	25
4	(Italy) Pietro Delli Guanti	10	12	Ret	19	18	13			11
Pos.	Driver	IMO (Italy)	MON (Monaco)	CAT (Spain)	RBR (Austria)	SPA (Belgium)	HUN (Hungary)	ZND (Netherlands)	MNZ (Italy)	Points

=== Teams' championship ===
Scoring system

- Only the best two results count for teams fielding more than two entries.

Pos	Team	IMO (Italy)	MON (Note: Half points were awarded as less than 50% of the scheduled distance was completed.) (Monaco)	CAT (Spain)	RBR (Austria)	SPA (Belgium)	HUN (Hungary)	ZND (Netherlands)	MNZ (Italy)	Points
1	(France) Schumacher CLRT	5	3	1	3	1	6	1	2	233
1	(France) Schumacher CLRT	Ret	9	5	6	2	2	3	10	233
2	(Austria) BWT Lechner Racing	Ret	1	2	1	3	5	2	4	191.5
2	(Austria) BWT Lechner Racing	Ret	Ret	3	2	7	7	8	8	191.5
3	(Netherlands) GP Elite	2	4	4	4	4	3	Ret	11	128
3	(Netherlands) GP Elite	3	8	6	9	8	9	11	5	128
4	(France) Martinet by Alméras	20	15	26	26	21	18	21	21	97.5
4	(France) Martinet by Alméras	Ret	DNS		5	6	1	Ret	3	97.5
5	(Germany) Proton Huber Competition	1	2	9	15	12	Ret	5	Ret	92
5	(Germany) Proton Huber Competition	12	7	24	18	15	10	16	Ret	92
6	(Italy) Target Competition	9	11	8	7	10	Ret	6	12	64.5
6	(Italy) Target Competition	Ret	Ret	11	12	14	Ret	10	19	64.5
7	(Italy) Ombra S.R.L.	4	10	15	8	16	19†	14	9	46
7	(Italy) Ombra S.R.L.	Ret	14	19	27	20	8	22	15	46
8	(Spain) Hadeca Racing	7	5	14	10	11	Ret	9	16	38.5
9	(Italy) Dinamic Motorsport	11	6	13	13	17	12	Ret	13	37
9	(Italy) Dinamic Motorsport	10	12	Ret	14	19	11	19	14	37
Pos	Team	IMO (Italy)	MON (Monaco)	CAT (Spain)	RBR (Austria)	SPA (Belgium)	HUN (Hungary)	ZND (Netherlands)	MNZ (Italy)	Points
