= Benjamin Paque =

Belgian racing driver (born 2005)

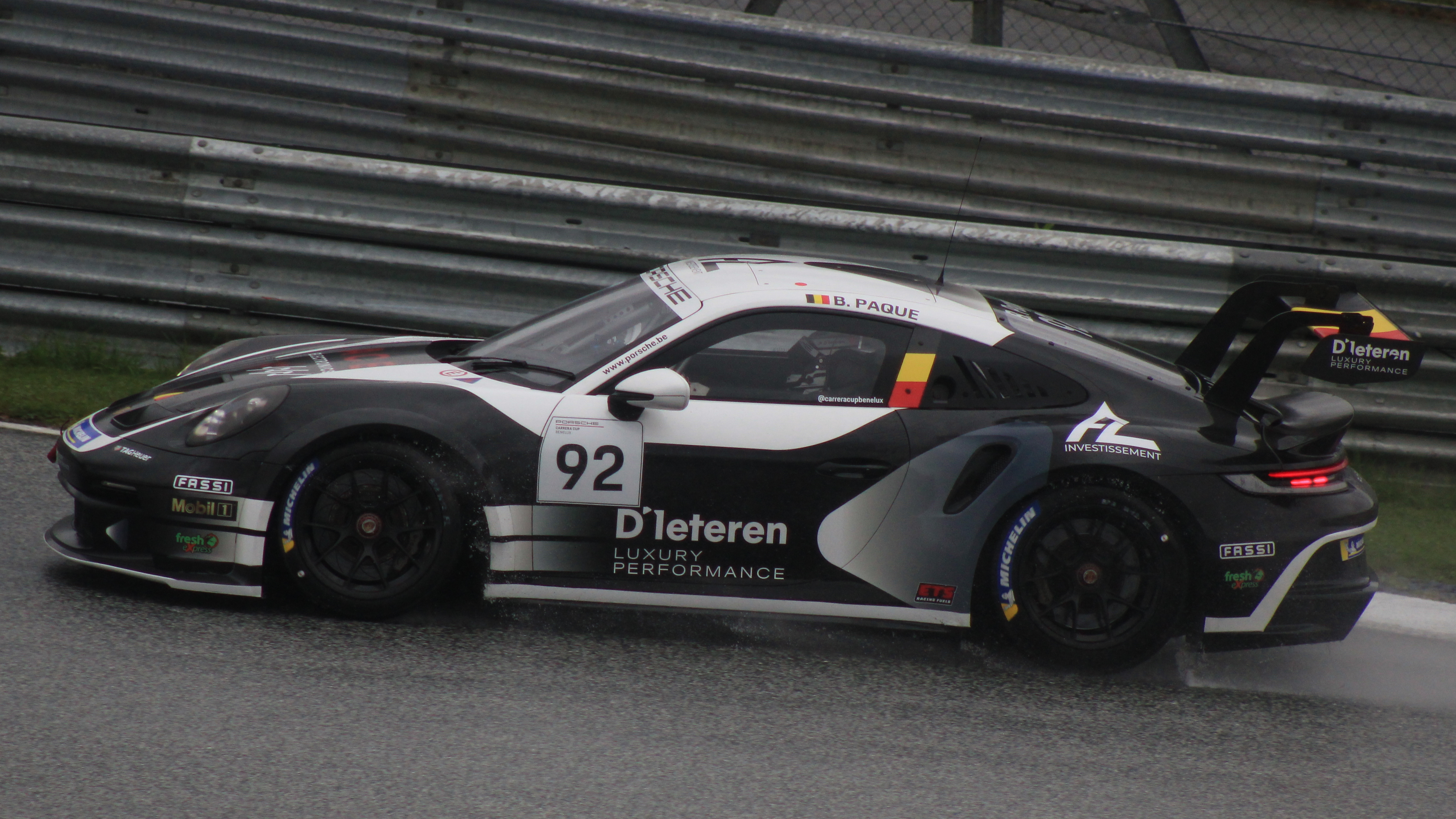
- Paque in 2024
- Nationality: (Belgium) Belgian
- Born: 18 March 2005 (age 21) Awans, Liège, Belgium

Porsche Supercup career
- Debut season: 2022
- Current team: Martinet by Alméras
- Categorisation: FIA Silver
- Former teams: CLRT
- Starts: 10
- Wins: 0
- Podiums: 0
- Poles: 0
- Fastest laps: 0
- Best finish: TBD in 2025

Benjamin Paque (born 18 March 2005) is a Belgian racing driver who competes in the 24H Series for GetSpeed Team PCX Racing. Paque is the overall pole-sitter of the 2026 Dubai 24 Hour. He previously competed in Porsche Supercup, and won the 24 Hours of Zolder in 2024.

== Career ==
=== Porsche competition ===
After a brief karting career, Paque made his car racing debut in 2021 with Speedlover and won the Porsche Sprint Challenge Benelux in the GT4 class. Graduating to Porsche Sprint Challenge France in 2022, the Belgian took eight wins from nine races to crown himself champion for Côme Ledogar's CLRT squad. Paque also made a cameo in the Porsche Supercup at Monaco, before taking part in the final two rounds of the Porsche Carrera Cup France, recording a highest result of fifth as a guest driver.

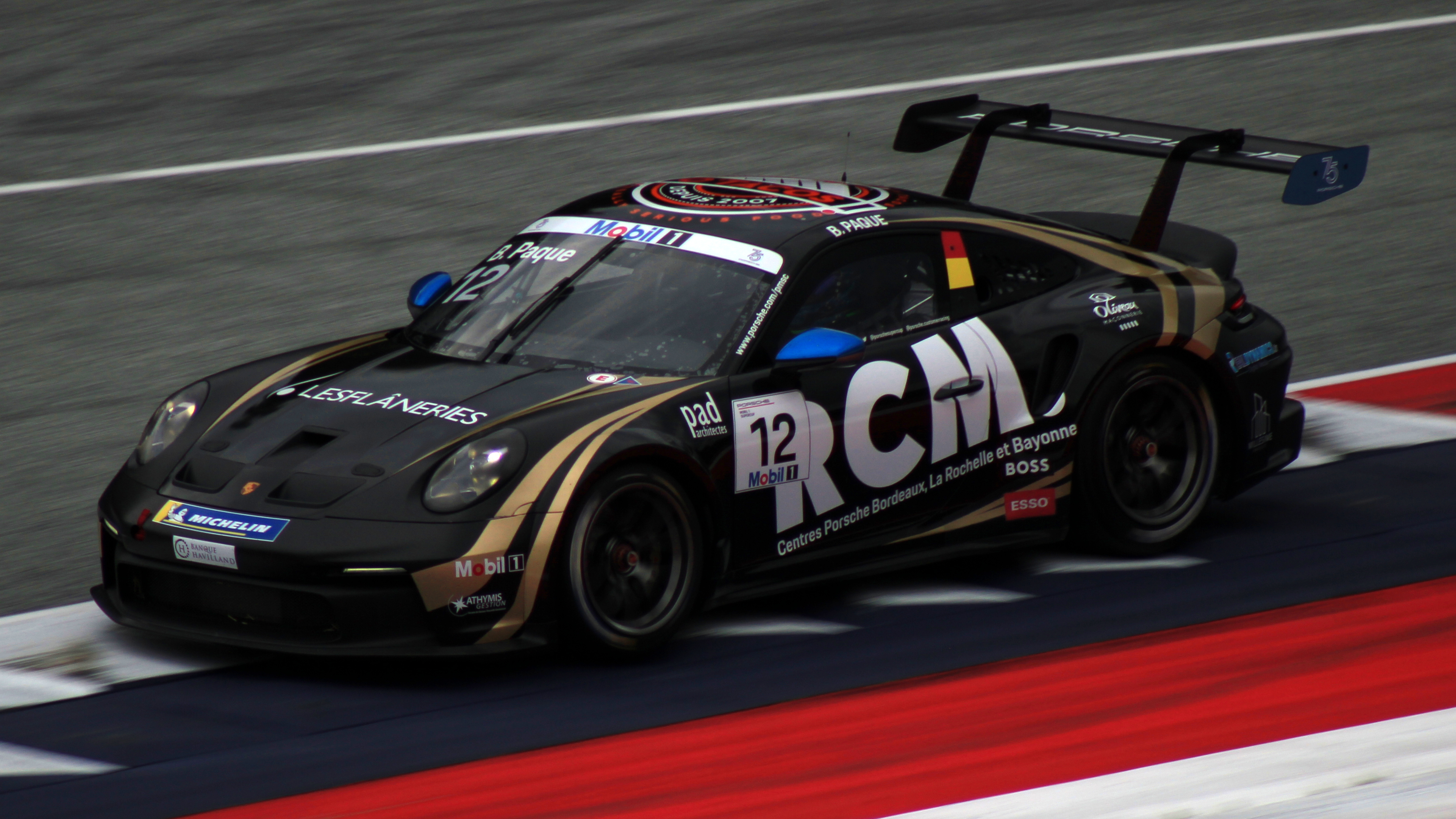
Paque racing for CLRT in Porsche Supercup at the Red Bull Ring in 2023.

Paque started 2023 in the Porsche Sprint Challenge Southern Europe with August By NGT and came runner-up after taking one win. With the same team, he contested select rounds of the Porsche Carrera Cup Benelux and claimed a podium at Zandvoort. Paque's main programme, however, was a full-time debut in the Porsche Supercup with CLRT, as he got his season-best result of fifth at the Hungaroring and ended his rookie year fifteenth in the overall standings.

After a difficult Porsche Supercup season, Paque moved back to national Carrera Cup racing in 2024 and entered a dual campaign in Porsche Carrera Cup France with TFT Racing and Porsche Carrera Cup Benelux with D'ieteren Luxury Performance. In the PCCF, he had a consistent year despite skipping one round to prioritise his PCCB campaign. Throughout the season, he got one podium in his home round at Circuit de Spa-Francorchamps and ended the championship in seventh. His PCCB campaign spared better as he won the first race of the opening round at Spa from pole position. He won the second race of the next round at Zandvoort and came fourth and third in the following round at Imola Circuit. Paque got his second pole position in the first race of the penultimate round in the Red Bull Ring and collected his final podium of the year in the second race. He ended the season in third position.

In 2025, Paque continued with TFT Racing for a full-time shot at the Porsche Carrera Cup France and collected two podiums – both third places – in the final two rounds of the season, at Valencia and Paul Ricard. Paque ended the championship in seventh. The Belgian also featured in the second round of the Porsche Carrera Cup Italia at Vallelunga, and achieved a podium in the second race. He returned to the Porsche Supercup for one round on home soil at Spa-Francorchamps and came fifth for Martinet by Alméras, the highest finish for a guest driver all year.

=== GT3 career ===
Having entered the 2025 Dubai 24 Hour in a Porsche 911 GT3 Cup (992), Paque and TFT Racing graduated to GT3 machinery halfway through the 24H Series season. Sharing a Pro-Am–class Mercedes-AMG GT3 Evo with Jordan Boisson and Patrick Charlaix, the trio combined with Mercedes-AMG factory stars Nico Bastian and Maro Engel to take third overall at Paul Ricard and pole at Barcelona respectively.

Paque then kicked off 2026 with a shock pole position at the flagship Dubai 24 Hour, as he edged out Audi's Pierre Kaffer by 0.252 seconds. After a DNF in the race, Paque and his crew then switched to GetSpeed Team PCX Racing for the European swing, securing pole again at Mugello alongside Engel.

== Personal life ==
Paque's father, Pierre-Yves, is also a racing driver.

== Karting record ==
=== Karting career summary ===
Season	Series	Team	Position
2019	IAME Series Benelux – X30 Junior		25th
2020	IAME Series Benelux – X30 Junior		
2021	IAME Euro Series – X30 Senior	RSD Karting	94th

== Racing record ==
=== Racing career summary ===
Season	Series	Team	Races	Wins	Poles	F/Laps	Podiums	Points	Position
2021	Porsche Sprint Challenge Benelux – Class GT4	Speedlover	?	?	?	?	?	115	**1st**
2021	Belcar Endurance – GT	Speedlover	3	0	0	0	0	?	?
2021	Benelux Racing Series – GT4		?	?	?	?	?	?	?
2022	Porsche Supercup	CLRT	1	0	0	0	0	0	NC†
2022	Porsche Carrera Cup France	CLRT	4	0	0	0	0	0	NC†
2022	Porsche Sprint Challenge France	CLRT	9	8	?	?	9	164	**1st**
2022	Belgian Endurance – Belcar GTA		1	0	0	0	0	0	NC
2023	Porsche Sprint Challenge Southern Europe	August By NGT	6	1	0	2	6	123	**2nd**
2023	Porsche Carrera Cup Benelux	August By NGT	6	0	1	1	1	65	9th
2023	Porsche Supercup	CLRT	8	0	0	0	0	37	15th
2023	Ultimate Cup Series Endurance GT-Touring Challenge – Porsche Cup	Seblajoux Racing	1	0	1	0	1	18	18th
2023–24	Middle East Trophy – 992	SebLajoux Racing by DUWO Racing							
2024	Porsche Carrera Cup France	TFT Racing	10	0	0	0	1	106	7th
2024	Porsche Carrera Cup Benelux	D'ieteren Luxury Performance	12	2	2	1	4	145	**3rd**
2024	Porsche Carrera Cup Italy	Target Competition	2	0	0	0	0	12	21st
2024	24 Hours of Zolder	D'Ieteren Luxury Performance by NGT	1	1	0	0	1	—N/a	**1st**
2025	Middle East Trophy – 992	TFT Racing							
2025	Porsche Carrera Cup France	TFT Racing	12	0	0	0	2	114	7th
2025	Ultimate Cup European Series – GT Endurance Cup – UCS1	TFT Racing							
2025	24H Series – GT3	TFT Racing							
2025	Porsche Carrera Cup Italy	BeDriver	2	0	0	0	1	29	17th
2025	Porsche Supercup	Martinet by Alméras	1	0	0	0	0	0	NC†
2025	Belcar Endurance Championship – GT Cup	Art Racing							
2025–26	24H Series Middle East – GT3	TFT Racing							
2026	24H Series – GT3	GetSpeed Team PCX Racing	5	0	4	3	1	101	6th
2026	GT World Challenge Europe Endurance Cup	GetSpeed Team PCX Racing	1	0	0	0	0	0	NC
2026	GT World Challenge Europe Endurance Cup	Razoon - more than racing	1	0	0	0	0	0	NC
2026	European Le Mans Series - LMGT3	High Class Racing	2	0	0	0	1	21	17th
2026	Shanghai 8 Hours	Tarmac by Climax Racing	1	0	0	0	1	N/A	**2nd**

† As Paque was a guest driver, he was ineligible for points.

=== Complete Porsche Supercup results ===
(key) (Races in bold indicate pole position) (Races in italics indicate fastest lap)

Year	Team	1	2	3	4	5	6	7	8	Pos.	Points
2022	CLRT	IMO	MON; 22	SIL	RBR	LEC	SPA	ZND	MNZ	NC†	0
2023	CLRT	MON; 13	RBR; 11	SIL; 8	HUN; 5	SPA; 12	ZND; 22	ZND; 15	MNZ; Ret	15th	37
2025	Martinet by Alméras	IMO	MON	CAT	RBR	SPA; 5	HUN	ZAN	MNZ	NC†	0

† As Paque was a guest driver, he was ineligible for points.

=== Complete Porsche Carrera Cup France results ===
(key) (Races in bold indicate pole position) (Races in italics indicate fastest lap)

Year	Team	1	2	3	4	5	6	7	8	9	10	11	12	Pos	Points
2022	CLRT	NOG; 1	NOG; 2	SPA; 1	SPA; 2	MAG; 1	MAG; 2	ZAN; 1	ZAN; 2	VAL; 1; 8	VAL; 2; 5	LEC; 1; 7	LEC; 2; 7	NC†	0
2024	TFT Racing	CAT; 1; 7	CAT; 2; 6	LEC; 1; 7	LEC; 2; 4	SPA; 1; 3	SPA; 2; 8	DIJ; 1	DIJ; 2	MUG; 1; 8	MUG; 2; 5	ALG; 1; 6	ALG; 2; 7	7th	106
2025	TFT Racing	CAT; 1; 13	CAT; 2; 5	DIJ; 1; 8	DIJ; 2; 6	SPA; 1; 11	SPA; 2; 9	MIS; 1; 6	MIS; 2; 10	VAL; 1; 3	VAL; 2; 10	LEC; 1; 3	LEC; 2; 5	7th	114

† As Paque was a guest driver, he was ineligible for points.

=== Complete Porsche Carrera Cup Italia results ===
(key) (Races in bold indicate pole position) (Races in italics indicate fastest lap)

Year	Team	1	2	3	4	5	6	7	8	9	10	11	12	Pos	Points
2024	Target Competition	MIS; 1	MIS; 2	IMO1; 1	IMO1; 2	MUG; 1	MUG; 2	IMO2; 1	IMO2; 2	VLL; 1; 5	VLL; 2; 30	MNZ; 1	MNZ; 2	21st	12
2025	BeDriver	MIS1; 1	MIS1; 2	VLL; 1; 5	VLL; 2; 3	MUG; 1	MUG; 2	IMO; 1	IMO; 2	MIS2; 1	MIS2; 2	MNZ; 1	MNZ; 2	17th	29

=== Complete GT World Challenge Europe results ===
==== GT World Challenge Europe Endurance Cup ====
(key) (Races in bold indicate pole position) (Races in italics indicate fastest lap)

Year	Team	Car	Class	1	2	3	4	5	6	7	Pos.	Points
2026	Razoon - more than racing	Porsche 911 GT3 R (992.2)	Bronze	LEC; 40	MNZ						39th	2
2026	GetSpeed Team PCX	Mercedes-AMG GT3 Evo	Pro-Am			SPA; 6H; 50	SPA; 12H; 34	SPA; 24H; 33	NÜR	ALG	NC	0

^{*} Season still in progress.

=== Complete European Le Mans Series results ===
(key) (Races in bold indicate pole position) (Races in italics indicate fastest lap)

Year	Entrant	Class	Chassis	Engine	1	2	3	4	5	6	Rank	Points
2026	High Class Racing	LMGT3	Porsche 911 GT3 R (992.2)	Porsche 4.2 L Flat-6	CAT	LEC	IMO	SPA	SIL; 7	ALG; 3	17th	21
