= 2024 Porsche Carrera Cup France =

Motor racing competition

The 2024 Porsche Carrera Cup France was the 38th season of the Porsche Carrera Cup France. The season began at Circuit de Barcelona-Catalunya on 12 April and ended at Algarve International Circuit on 19 October.

== Calendar ==
Round	Circuit	Date	Supporting	Map of circuit locations
1	Circuit de Barcelona-Catalunya, Montmeló, Spain	12–14 April	European Le Mans Series; Le Mans Cup; Ligier European Series	2024 Porsche Carrera Cup France is located in Europe
2	Circuit Paul Ricard, Le Castellet, France	3–5 May	European Le Mans Series; Le Mans Cup; Ligier European Series	2024 Porsche Carrera Cup France is located in Europe
3	Circuit de Spa-Francorchamps, Stavelot, Belgium	21–23 June	French GT4 Cup; British GT Championship; French F4 Championship	2024 Porsche Carrera Cup France is located in Europe
4	Dijon-Prenois, Prenois, France	13–15 September	French GT4 Cup; French F4 Championship; TC France Series	2024 Porsche Carrera Cup France is located in Europe
5	Mugello Circuit, Scarperia e San Piero, Italy	27–29 September	European Le Mans Series; Le Mans Cup; Ligier European Series	2024 Porsche Carrera Cup France is located in Europe
6	Algarve International Circuit, Portimão, Portugal	17–19 October	European Le Mans Series; Le Mans Cup; Ligier European Series	2024 Porsche Carrera Cup France is located in Europe

== Entry list ==
Team	No.	Driver	Class	Rounds
(France) TFT Racing	2	(Belgium) Benjamin Paque	P	1–3, 5–6
(France) TFT Racing	2	(France) Jordan Boisson	Am	4
(France) TFT Racing	5	(France) Jean-Philippe Lamic	Am	1
(France) TFT Racing	5	(France) Jordan Boisson	Am	2
(France) TFT Racing	5	(Belgium) Alexandre Leroy	Am	3
(France) TFT Racing	5	(Canada) Patrick Charlaix	Am	4
(France) TFT Racing	5	(Canada) Patrick Charlaix	Am	5–6
(France) TFT Racing	67	(France) Jérémie Lessoudier	PA	1–2
(France) TFT Racing	67	(France) Jordan Boisson	Am	3
(France) TFT Racing	67	(France) Jordan Boisson	Am	5–6
(France) TFT Racing	96	(France) Jordan Boisson	Am	1
(France) Racing Technology	7	(France) Jérôme Boullery	PA	All
(France) Racing Technology	9	(France) Sylvain Noël	PA	6
(France) Racing Technology	44	(France) Cyril Caillo	Am	All
(France) / CLRT Schumacher (Note: Cars No. 33 and 77 entered as CLRT Schumacher and cars No. 11, 88 and 99 entered as Schumacher CLRT); (France) / Schumacher CLRT	11	(France) Alessandro Ghiretti	P	All
(France) / CLRT Schumacher; (France) / Schumacher CLRT	33	(France) Paul Cauhaupé	P R	All
(France) / CLRT Schumacher; (France) / Schumacher CLRT	77	(France) Louis Perrot	P	All
(France) / CLRT Schumacher; (France) / Schumacher CLRT	88	(France) Jean-Philippe Gambaro	Am	All
(France) / CLRT Schumacher; (France) / Schumacher CLRT	99	(France) Marcus Amand	P R	All
(France) / Martinet by Alméras (Note: Cars No. 14, 16 and 17 entered as Martinet by Alméras and cars No. 27 and 29 entered as Martinet/Forestier Racing); (France) / Martinet/Forestier Racing	14	(Spain) Fernando Monje	P	1–2
(France) / Martinet by Alméras; (France) / Martinet/Forestier Racing	14	(Luxembourg) Dylan Pereira	P	3
(France) / Martinet by Alméras; (France) / Martinet/Forestier Racing	14	(Italy) Gianmarco Quaresmini	P R	5
(France) / Martinet by Alméras; (France) / Martinet/Forestier Racing	14	(Mozambique) Rodrigo Dias Almeida	P	6
(France) / Martinet by Alméras; (France) / Martinet/Forestier Racing	16	(France) Mathys Jaubert	P	All
(France) / Martinet by Alméras; (France) / Martinet/Forestier Racing	17	(France) Victor Bernier	P R	All
(France) / Martinet by Alméras; (France) / Martinet/Forestier Racing	27	(France) Marlon Hernandez	P	1–4, 6
(France) / Martinet by Alméras; (France) / Martinet/Forestier Racing	27	(Italy) Francesco Braschi	P R	5
(France) / Martinet by Alméras; (France) / Martinet/Forestier Racing	29	(France) Louis Rousset	P	All
(France) ABM	21	(France) Marc Guillot	PA	All
(France) ABM	66	(France) Gilles Colombani	Am	1–2
(France) ABM	66	(France) Sébastien Poisson	PA	3
(France) ABM	66	(France) Sébastien Poisson	PA	5–6
(France) ABM	66	(France) Marvin Klein	P	4
(France) ABM	74	(France) Marvin Klein	P	1
(France) ABM	74	(France) Florian Latorre	P	2–6
(Belgium) Speedlover	22	(Belgium) Kobe Pauwels	P R	2
(Belgium) Speedlover	97	(United States) Dominique Bastien	Am	2
(Estonia) EST1 Racing	47	(Estonia) Alexander Reimann	P	6
(France) Debard Automobiles by Racetivity	81	(France) Eric Debard	Am	All

P	Pro Cup
R	Rookie
PA	Pro-Am Cup
Am	Am Cup
	Guest Starter

- Karim Ajlani was supposed to compete with ABM but did not appear in any round.

== Results ==
Round		Circuit	Pole position	Fastest lap	Overall winner	Winning team	Pro-Am winner	Am winner	Rookie winner
1	R1	(Spain) Circuit de Barcelona-Catalunya	(France) Alessandro Ghiretti	(France) Alessandro Ghiretti	(France) Alessandro Ghiretti	(France) Schumacher CLRT	(France) Marc Guillot	(France) Cyril Caillo	(France) Victor Bernier
1	R2	(Spain) Circuit de Barcelona-Catalunya	(France) Alessandro Ghiretti	(France) Alessandro Ghiretti	(France) Alessandro Ghiretti	(France) Schumacher CLRT	(France) Marc Guillot	(France) Cyril Caillo	(France) Victor Bernier
2	R1	(France) Circuit Paul Ricard	(France) Alessandro Ghiretti	(France) Alessandro Ghiretti	(France) Alessandro Ghiretti	(France) Schumacher CLRT	(France) Marc Guillot	(France) Eric Debard	(France) Marcus Amand
2	R2	(France) Circuit Paul Ricard	(France) Alessandro Ghiretti	(France) Alessandro Ghiretti	(France) Mathys Jaubert	(France) Martinet by Alméras	(France) Jérôme Boullery	(France) Eric Debard	(France) Victor Bernier
3	R1	(Belgium) Circuit de Spa-Francorchamps	(France) Alessandro Ghiretti	(France) Alessandro Ghiretti	(France) Alessandro Ghiretti	(France) Schumacher CLRT	(France) Jérôme Boullery	(France) Cyril Caillo	(France) Paul Cauhaupé
3	R2	(Belgium) Circuit de Spa-Francorchamps	(France) Alessandro Ghiretti	(France) Alessandro Ghiretti	(France) Alessandro Ghiretti	(France) Schumacher CLRT	(France) Jérôme Boullery	(France) Cyril Caillo	(France) Paul Cauhaupé
4	R1	(France) Dijon-Prenois	(France) Alessandro Ghiretti	(France) Alessandro Ghiretti	(France) Alessandro Ghiretti	(France) Schumacher CLRT	(France) Marc Guillot	(France) Cyril Caillo	(France) Marcus Amand
4	R2	(France) Dijon-Prenois	(France) Alessandro Ghiretti	(France) Alessandro Ghiretti	(France) Alessandro Ghiretti	(France) Schumacher CLRT	(France) Marc Guillot	(France) Cyril Caillo	(France) Marcus Amand
5	R1	(Italy) Mugello Circuit	(France) Mathys Jaubert	(France) Alessandro Ghiretti	(France) Mathys Jaubert	(France) Martinet by Alméras	(France) Marc Guillot	(France) Cyril Caillo	(France) Marcus Amand
5	R2	(Italy) Mugello Circuit	(France) Mathys Jaubert	(France) Alessandro Ghiretti	(France) Mathys Jaubert	(France) Martinet by Alméras	(France) Marc Guillot	(France) Cyril Caillo	(France) Marcus Amand
6	R1	(Portugal) Algarve International Circuit	(France) Alessandro Ghiretti	(France) Alessandro Ghiretti	(France) Alessandro Ghiretti	(France) Schumacher CLRT	(France) Jérôme Boullery	(France) Cyril Caillo	(France) Marcus Amand
6	R2	(Portugal) Algarve International Circuit	(France) Alessandro Ghiretti	(France) Louis Perrot	(France) Alessandro Ghiretti	(France) Schumacher CLRT	(France) Jérôme Boullery	(France) Cyril Caillo	(France) Marcus Amand

== Championship standings ==
=== Scoring system ===
Position	**1st**	**2nd**	**3rd**	**4th**	**5th**	**6th**	**7th**	**8th**	**9th**	**10th**	**11th**	**12th**	**13th**	**14th**	**15th**	**Pole**	**FL**
Points	25	20	17	14	12	10	9	8	7	6	5	4	3	2	1	1	1

Only 10 best results count for the Pro-Am and Am classifications.

=== Overall ===
Pos.	Driver	Team	(Spain) BAR		(France) LEC		(Belgium) SPA		(France) DIJ		(Italy) MUG		(Portugal) ALG		Points
1	(France) Alessandro Ghiretti	(France) Schumacher CLRT	**1**	**1**	**1**	**3**	**1**	**1**	**1**	**1**	2	2	**1**	**1**	303
2	(France) Mathys Jaubert	(France) Martinet by Alméras	2	3	2	1	6	3	2	3	**1**	**1**	4	4	226
3	(France) Louis Perrot	(France) CLRT Schumacher	3	2	Ret	5	10	6	3	4	3	Ret	2	2	154
4	(France) Marcus Amand	(France) Schumacher CLRT	8	8	3	8	7	5	5	5	4	3	3	3	151
5	(France) Paul Cauhaupé	(France) CLRT Schumacher	9	9	5	11	4	2	6	6	6	12	5	5	126
6	(France) Victor Bernier	(France) Martinet by Alméras	5	5	DSQ	2	9	7	8	11	7	4	7	8	113
7	(Belgium) Benjamin Paque	(France) TFT Racing	7	6	7	4	3	8			8	5	6	7	106
8	(France) Florian Latorre	(France) ABM			4	6	5	4	9	7	5	6	10	6	104
9	(France) Louis Rousset	(France) Martinet/Forestier Racing	6	7	8	7	11	Ret	10	8	10	8	8	10	85
10	(France) Marvin Klein	(France) ABM	4	4					4	2					62
11	(France) Jérôme Boullery	(France) Racing Technology	12	12	Ret	9	12	9	12	10	12	11	11	12	58
12	(France) Marlon Hernandez	(France) Martinet/Forestier Racing	13	10	6	15	8	Ret	7	12			9	9	56
13	(France) Marc Guillot	(France) ABM	10	11	10	Ret	18	Ret	11	9	11	10	12	13	52
14	(France) Cyril Caillo	(France) Racing Technology	14	14	17	13	13	10	13	13	14	14	14	14	38
15	(France) Eric Debard	(France) Debard Automobiles by Racetivity	18	17	12	12	16	13	16	14	16	16	15	17	25
16	(Luxembourg) Dylan Pereira	(France) Martinet by Alméras					2	Ret							20
17	(France) Jean-Philippe Gambaro	(France) Schumacher CLRT	15	18	14	17	Ret	12	14	15	15	17	17	DSQ	18
18	(Spain) Fernando Monje	(France) Martinet by Alméras	11	13	11	14									17
19	(France) Sébastien Poisson (Note: Poisson was ineligible to score points in rounds 5 and 6.)	(France) ABM					14	11			13	13	Ret	16	7
20	(France) Jérémie Lessoudier	(France) TFT Racing	16	15	13	16									6
21	(France) Jordan Boisson (Note: Boisson was ineligible to score points in rounds 1, 5 and 6.)	(France) TFT Racing	17	16	15	18	15	Ret	15	16	17	15	16	18	4
22	(Belgium) Alexandre Leroy	(France) TFT Racing					17	14							2
23	(France) Gilles Colombani	(France) ABM	19	Ret	16	19									1
24	(Canada) Patrick Charlaix (Note: Charlaix was ineligible to score points in rounds 5 and 6.)	(France) TFT Racing							17	17	Ret	DNS	19	20	0
25	(France) Jean-Philippe Lamic	(France) TFT Racing	20	19											0
Guest drivers ineligible to score points
–	(Italy) Francesco Braschi	(France) Martinet/Forestier Racing									9	7			–
–	(Belgium) Kobe Pauwels	(Belgium) Speedlover			9	10									–
–	(Italy) Gianmarco Quaresmini	(France) Martinet by Alméras									18	9			–
–	(Mozambique) Rodrigo Dias Almeida	(France) Martinet by Alméras											Ret	11	–
–	(France) Sylvain Noël	(France) Racing Technology											13	15	–
–	(Estonia) Alexander Reimann	(Estonia) EST1 Racing											18	19	–
–	(United States) Dominique Bastien	(Belgium) Speedlover			18	20									–
Pos.	Driver	Team	(Spain) BAR		(France) LEC		(Belgium) SPA		(France) DIJ		(Italy) MUG		(Portugal) ALG		Points

Colour	Result
Gold	Winner
Silver	Second place
Bronze	Third place
Green	Points classification
Blue	Non-points classification
Blue	Non-classified finish (NC)
Purple	Retired, not classified (Ret)
Red	Did not qualify (DNQ)
Red	Did not pre-qualify (DNPQ)
Black	Disqualified (DSQ)
White	Did not start (DNS)
White	Withdrew (WD)
White	Race cancelled (C)
Blank	Did not practice (DNP)
Blank	Did not arrive (DNA)
Blank	Excluded (EX)

**Bold** – Pole
Italics – Fastest Lap
† — Did not finish, but classified

=== Pro-Am ===
Pos.	Driver	Team	(Spain) BAR		(France) LEC		(Belgium) SPA		(France) DIJ		(Italy) MUG		(Portugal) ALG		Net points	Points
1	(France) Marc Guillot	(France) ABM	**1**	**1**	1	Ret*	3	Ret*	**1**	**1**	**1**	**1**	**2**	**2**	244	244
2	(France) Jérôme Boullery	(France) Racing Technology	2	2*	**Ret***	**1**	**1**	**1**	2	2	2	2	1	1	257	238
3	(France) Jérémie Lessoudier	(France) TFT Racing	3	3	2	2									74	74
4	(France) Sébastien Poisson	(France) ABM					2	2			3 (Note: Poisson got the fastest lap in Pro-Am class during Race 1 in Mugello, but he wasn't eligible to score points, so the fastest lap point was awarded to Boullery.)	3	4	4	40	40
Guest drivers ineligible to score points
–	(France) Sylvain Noël	(France) Racing Technology											3	3	–	–
Pos.	Driver	Team	(Spain) BAR		(France) LEC		(Belgium) SPA		(France) DIJ		(Italy) MUG		(Portugal) ALG			Points

=== Am ===
Pos.	Driver	Team	(Spain) BAR		(France) LEC		(Belgium) SPA		(France) DIJ		(Italy) MUG		(Portugal) ALG		Net points	Points
1	(France) Cyril Caillo	(France) Racing Technology	1	**1**	**5***	**2***	**1**	**1**	**1**	1	1	1	**1**	**1**	300	265
2	(France) Eric Debard	(France) Debard Automobiles by Racetivity	4	3	1	1	3	3*	4*	2	3	3	2	2	233	202
3	(France) Jean-Philippe Gambaro	(France) Schumacher CLRT	**2**	4	2	3*	Ret*	2	2	**3**	**2**	**4**	4	DSQ	190	173
4	(France) Jordan Boisson	(France) TFT Racing	3	2	3	4	2	Ret	3	4	4	2	3	3	82	82
5	(France) Gilles Colombani	(France) ABM	5	Ret	4	5									40	40
6	(Belgium) Alexandre Leroy	(France) TFT Racing					4	4							28	28
7	(France) Jean-Philippe Lamic	(France) TFT Racing	6	5											26	26
8	(Canada) Patrick Charlaix	(France) TFT Racing							5	5	Ret	DNS	5	4	24	24
Guest drivers ineligible to score points
–	(United States) Dominique Bastien	(Belgium) Speedlover			6	6									–	–
Pos.	Driver	Team	(Spain) BAR		(France) LEC		(Belgium) SPA		(France) DIJ		(Italy) MUG		(Portugal) ALG			Points

=== Rookie ===
Pos.	Driver	Team	(Spain) BAR		(France) LEC		(Belgium) SPA		(France) DIJ		(Italy) MUG		(Portugal) ALG		Points
1	(France) Marcus Amand	(France) Schumacher CLRT	8	8	3	8	7	5	5	5	**4**	**3**	**3**	**3**	162
2	(France) Paul Cauhaupé	(France) CLRT Schumacher	9	9	**5**	**11**	**4**	**2**	**6**	**6**	6	12	5	5	134
3	(France) Victor Bernier	(France) Martinet by Alméras	**5**	**5**	DSQ	2	9	7	8	11	7	4	7	8	118
Guest drivers ineligible to score points
–	(Italy) Francesco Braschi	(France) Martinet/Forestier Racing									9	7			–
–	(Belgium) Kobe Pauwels	(Belgium) Speedlover			9	10									–
–	(Italy) Gianmarco Quaresmini	(France) Martinet by Alméras									18	9			–
Pos.	Driver	Team	(Spain) BAR		(France) LEC		(Belgium) SPA		(France) DIJ		(Italy) MUG		(Portugal) ALG		Points

=== Teams ===
Pos.	Team	Points
1	(France) Schumacher CLRT	454
2	(France) Martinet by Alméras	343
3	(France) CLRT Schumacher	280
4	(France) ABM	206
5	(France) Martinet/Forestier Racing	141
6	(France) TFT Racing	115
7	(France) Debard Automobiles by Racetivity	26
