= Marcus Amand =

Finnish-French racing driver (born 2006)

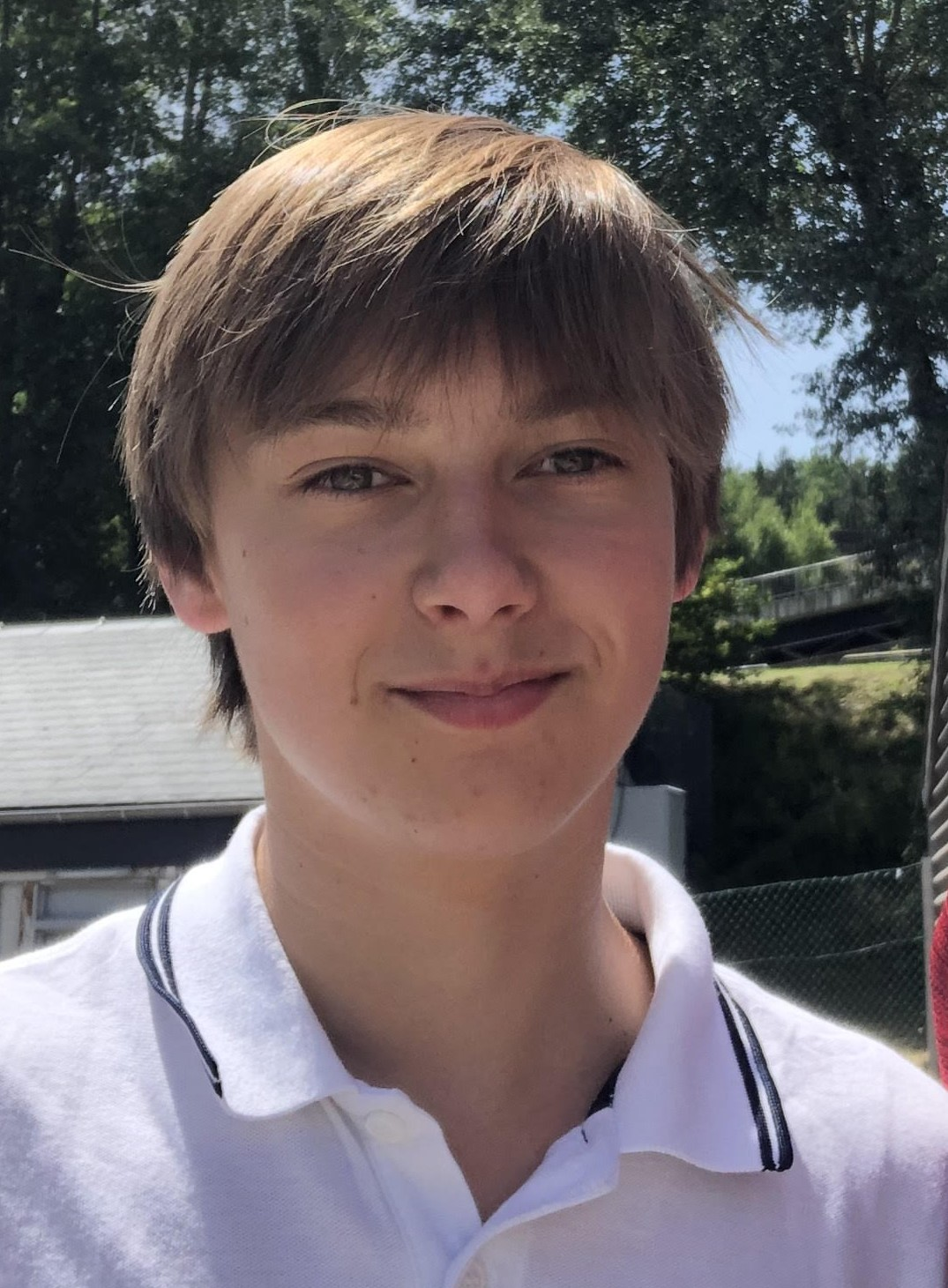
- Amand in 2022
- Nationality: (France) French (Finland) Finnish via dual nationality
- Born: 5 February 2006 (age 20) Oulu, Finland

Porsche Supercup career
- Debut season: 2026
- Current team: Lechner Racing
- Categorisation: FIA Silver
- Car number: 2
- Starts: 5
- Wins: 1
- Podiums: 1
- Poles: 1
- Fastest laps: 1

Previous series
- 2024-2025 2023 2021-2022 2021-2022: Porsche Carrera Cup France; FR European Championship; Italian F4 Championship; ADAC Formula 4

Championship titles
- 2025: Porsche Carrera Cup France

Marcus Amand (born 5 February 2006) is a Finnish and French racing driver who is set to compete in the 2026 Porsche Supercup. He previously raced in FRECA, Italian F4 and ADAC F4 and is the 2019 European Karting Champion. After winning the 2025 Porsche Carrera Cup France, Amand became a Porsche junior driver for the 2026 season following a shootout.

== Early life ==
Amand and his twin sister were born in Oulu, Finland, to a Finnish mother and a French father.

== Early career ==
=== Karting ===
Amand won multiple national karting titles in France, including two Mini Kart titles in 2015. In 2017. he won the Mini MAX category of the Rotax Max Challenge Grand Finals. That year, he also won the Cadet category of the Rotax Max Challenge France. In 2019, he beat Andrea Kimi Antonelli to the OKJ title in the CIK-FIA Karting European Championship.

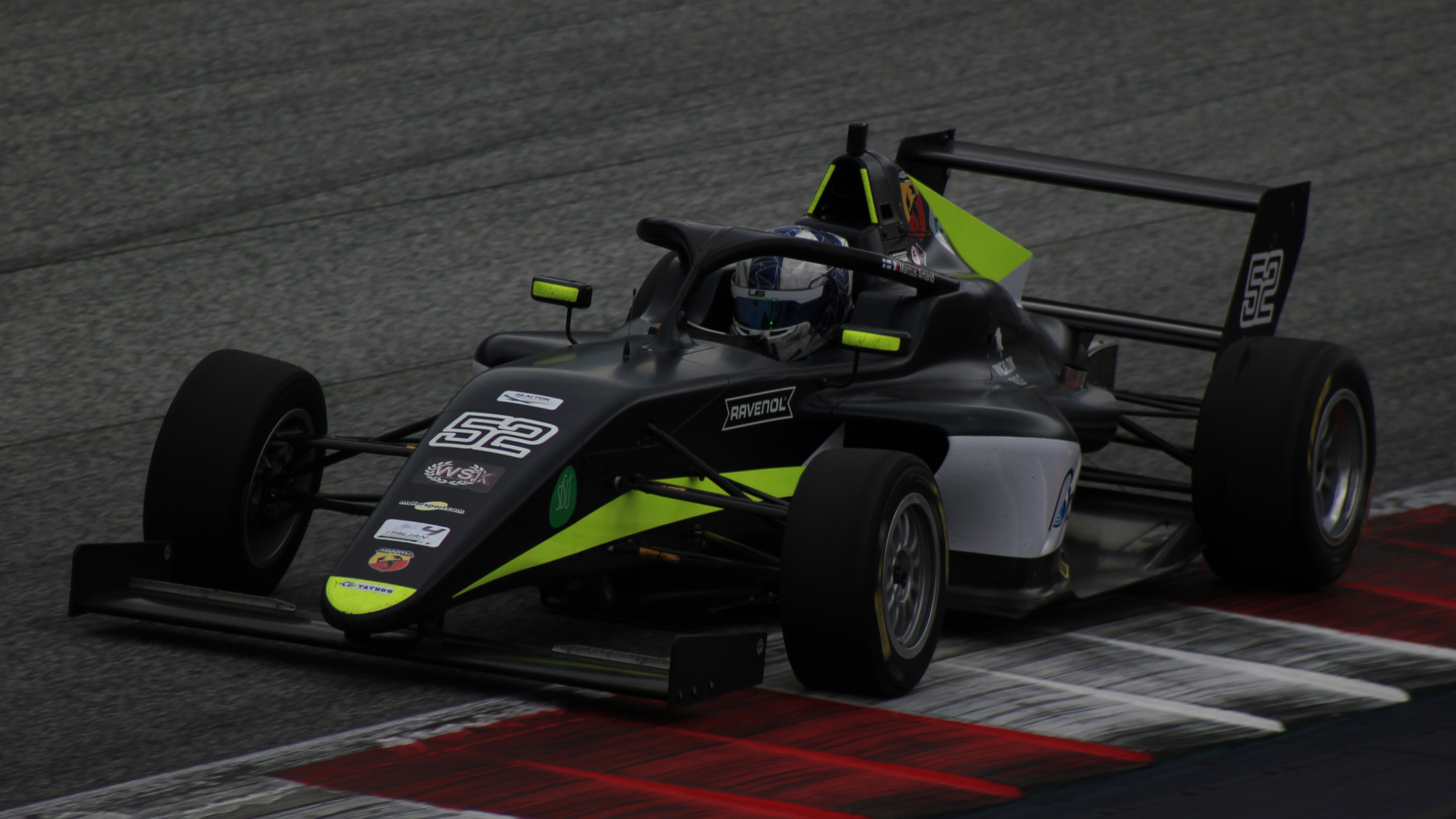
Amand at the Red Bull Ring in 2022

=== Formula 4 ===
In 2021, Amand made his single-seater debut in the ADAC Formula 4 Championship with R-ace GP. He also joined the team for some selected rounds of the Italian F4 Championship. In the ADAC Championship, he finished 12th overall and third in the rookie standings.

In 2022, Amand joined US Racing to compete in the full Italian F4 Championship and some rounds of the ADAC Formula 4 Championship. In the Italian Championship, he took a single podium at the Misano World Circuit and finished the season in ninth. In the ADAC Championship, he also took a single podium at the Hockenheimring.

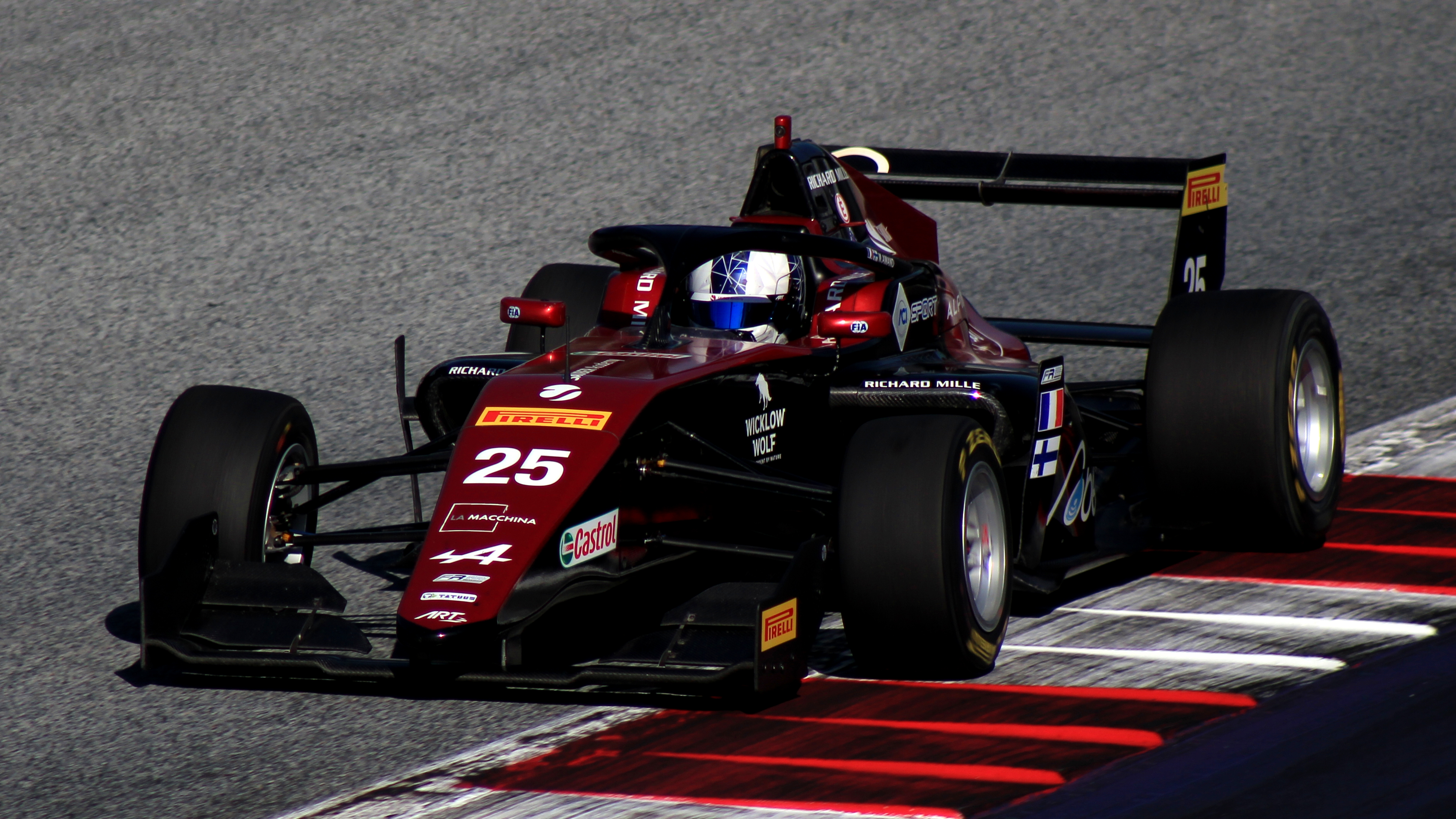
Amand at the Red Bull Ring in 2023

=== Formula Regional ===
In 2023, Amand stepped up to the Formula Regional European Championship with ART Grand Prix. In the penultimate round at Circuit Zandvoort he took his maiden pole position. He finished the race in second place, behind Andrea Kimi Antonelli, thus claiming his maiden rookie win of the season. At the end of the season, Amand placed 18th in the drivers' standings.

=== Formula One ===
In February 2023, it was announced that Amand would join the Sauber Academy along with Léna Bühler.

== Sportscar career ==
=== National Porsche Carrera Cups (2024–) ===
In 2024, Amand joined Schumacher CLRT in the Porsche Carrera Cup France. During his debut season, he scored four podiums and placed fourth in the standings, having finished inside the top eight in every race. Amand also won the rookie class against Paul Cauhaupé as well as friend and former schoolmate Victor Bernier.

Amand returned to the PCCF for the 2025 season. With three wins, all scored at the final three weekends, Amand secured the championship crown in a battle with Porsche Cup veteran Marvin Klein.

At the end of 2025, Amand took part in a 12-driver shootout against fellow Porsche Cup nominees. Amand ended up being chosen as a Porsche junior driver for the 2026 season alongside Flynt Schuring.

=== Porsche Supercup (2026–) ===
Going into 2026, Amand joined BWT Lechner Racing for his debut in the Porsche Supercup.

== Karting record ==
=== Karting career summary ===
Season	Series	Team	Position
2013	Championnat Regional Centre — Mini Kart		3rd
2013	Coupe de France — Mini Kart		15th
2013	Challenge Rotax Max France — Mini Kart		3rd
2014	Stars of Karting — Mini Kart		6th
2014	Challenge Rotax Max France — Mini Kart		1st
2015	Trophée Interclub — Mini Kart		1st
2015	Trophée Oscar Petit — Mini Kart		2nd
2015	Coupe de France — Mini Kart		1st
2015	Championnat de France — Minime		8th
2016	National Series Karting — Minime		2nd
2016	Championnat de France — Minime		12th
2016	Coupe de France — Minime		7th
2016	Challenge Rotax Max France — Minime		2nd
2017	WSK Champions Cup — 60 Mini	VDK	NC
2017	WSK Super Master Series — 60 Mini		35th
2017	Andrea Margutti Trophy — 60 Mini		8th
2017	National Series Karting — Cadet		1st
2017	Challenge Rotax Max France — Cadet		1st
2017	Coupe de France — Cadet		34th
2017	Championnat de France — Cadet		3rd
2017	Rotax Max Challenge Grand Finals — Mini MAX	Amand, Marc	1st
2018	WSK Champions Cup — OKJ	TB Racing Team	NC
2018	South Garda Winter Cup — OKJ	KR Motorsport	27th
2018	WSK Super Master Series — OKJ	KR Motorsport	24th
2018	WSK Open Cup — OKJ	KR Motorsport	6th
2018	CIK-FIA European Championship — OKJ	KR Motorsport	27th
2018	CIK-FIA World Championship — OKJ	KR Motorsport	6th
2018	WSK Final Cup — OKJ	KR Motorsport	4th
2018	Challenge Rotax Max France — Nationale		1st
2018	Rotax Max Challenge Grand Finals — Junior	Amand Racing	28th
2019	WSK Champions Cup — OKJ	KR Motorsport	8th
2019	South Garda Winter Cup — OKJ	KR Motorsport	NC
2019	WSK Super Master Series — OKJ	KR Motorsport	6th
2019	WSK Euro Series — OKJ	KR Motorsport	34th
2019	CIK-FIA European Championship — OKJ	KR Motorsport	1st
2019	Coupe de France — OKJ		8th
2019	CIK-FIA World Championship — OKJ	VDK Racing	NC
2019	WSK Open Cup — OKJ	VDK Racing	6th
2019	WSK Final Cup — OKJ	VDK Racing	NC
2020	WSK Champions Cup — OK	VDK Racing	13th
2020	WSK Super Master Series — OK	VDK Racing	42nd
2020	Champions of the Future — OK	VDK Racing	5th
2020	CIK-FIA European Championship — OK	VDK Racing	9th
2020	CIK-FIA World Championship — OK	VDK Racing	NC
2020	WSK Open Cup — OK	VDK Racing	2nd

== Racing record ==
=== Racing career summary ===
Season	Series	Team	Races	Wins	Poles	F/Laps	Podiums	Points	Position
2021	ADAC Formula 4 Championship	R-ace GP	18	0	0	0	0	37	12th
2021	Italian F4 Championship	R-ace GP	6	0	0	0	0	0	40th
2022	Italian F4 Championship	US Racing	20	0	0	0	1	94	9th
2022	ADAC Formula 4 Championship	US Racing	5	0	0	0	1	48	12th
2023	Formula Regional European Championship	ART Grand Prix	20	0	1	0	1	26	18th
2024	Porsche Carrera Cup France	Schumacher CLRT	12	0	0	0	4	151	4th
2025	Porsche Carrera Cup France	Schumacher CLRT	12	3	3	2	7	208	**1st**
2025	Porsche Carrera Cup Asia	Team Betterlife	3	2	2	1	2	—N/a	NC†
2025	Porsche Carrera Cup Australia - Pro	TekworkX Motorsport	11	1	1	1	5	—N/a	NC†
2026	Porsche Carrera Cup Asia	BWT Shanghai Yongda	10	5	1	2	10	219	**2nd**
2026	Porsche Carrera Cup Australia	TekworkX Motorsport	3	1	0	1	2	140*	10th*
2026	Porsche Supercup	BWT Lechner Racing	8	1	1	1	1	74	5th
2026	Porsche Carrera Cup Germany	Proton Competition	10	1	0	0	3	140	6th
2026	Porsche Carrera Cup Germany	Forch Racing by Atlas Ward	2	0	0	0	2	140	6th
2026	Nürburgring Langstrecken-Serie - SP7	Four Motors Bioconcept-Car							

† As Amand was a guest driver, he was ineligible for points.
^{*} Season still in progress.

=== Complete ADAC Formula 4 Championship results ===
(key) (Races in bold indicate pole position) (Races in italics indicate fastest lap)

Year	Team	1	2	3	4	5	6	7	8	9	10	11	12	13	14	15	16	17	18	Pos	Points
2021	R-ace GP	RBR; 1 DSQ	RBR; 2 Ret	RBR; 3 Ret	ZAN; 1; 16	ZAN; 2 Ret	ZAN; 3; 13	HOC1; 1; 8	HOC1; 2; 10	HOC1; 3; 9	SAC; 1 Ret	SAC; 2; 6	SAC; 3; 8	HOC2; 1 Ret	HOC2; 2; 9	HOC2; 3; 8	NÜR; 1; 9	NÜR; 2; 8	NÜR; 3; 7	12th	37
2022	US Racing	SPA; 1; 5	SPA; 2; 8	SPA; 3; 6	HOC; 1 DNS	HOC; 2; 7	HOC; 3; 2	ZAN; 1	ZAN; 2	ZAN; 3	NÜR1; 1	NÜR1; 2	NÜR1; 3	LAU; 1	LAU; 2	LAU; 3	NÜR2; 1	NÜR2; 2	NÜR2; 3	12th	48

=== Complete Italian F4 Championship results ===
(key) (Races in bold indicate pole position) (Races in italics indicate fastest lap)

Year	Team	1	2	3	4	5	6	7	8	9	10	11	12	13	14	15	16	17	18	19	20	21	22	DC	Points
2021	R-ace GP	LEC; 1; 22	LEC; 2; 14	LEC; 3; 23	MIS; 1; 21	MIS; 2; 19	MIS; 3; 20	VLL; 1	VLL; 2	VLL; 3	IMO; 1	IMO; 2	IMO; 3	RBR; 1	RBR; 2	RBR; 3	MUG; 1	MUG; 2	MUG; 3	MNZ; 1	MNZ; 2	MNZ; 3		40th	0
2022	US Racing	IMO; 1; 8	IMO; 2; 4	IMO; 3; 8	MIS; 1; 8	MIS; 2; 5	MIS; 3; 3	SPA; 1; 5	SPA; 2; 9	SPA; 3; 7	VLL; 1; 6	VLL; 2; 6	VLL; 3 Ret	RBR; 1 Ret	RBR; 2	RBR; 3; 9	RBR; 4; 10	MNZ; 1; 12	MNZ; 2; 8	MNZ; 3 C	MUG; 1; 8	MUG; 2; 36†	MUG; 3; 11	9th	94

=== Complete Formula Regional European Championship results ===
(key) (Races in bold indicate pole position) (Races in italics indicate fastest lap)

Year	Team	1	2	3	4	5	6	7	8	9	10	11	12	13	14	15	16	17	18	19	20	DC	Points
2023	ART Grand Prix	IMO; 1; 18	IMO; 2; 8	CAT; 1; 22	CAT; 2; 20	HUN; 1; 29	HUN; 2; 21	SPA; 1; 21	SPA; 2; 18	MUG; 1; 19	MUG; 2; 11	LEC; 1; 16	LEC; 2; 15	RBR; 1; 24	RBR; 2 Ret	MNZ; 1; 13	MNZ; 2; 9	ZAN; 1; 13	**ZAN**; **2**; 2	HOC; 1; 16	HOC; 2 Ret	18th	26

=== Complete Porsche Carrera Cup France results ===
(key) (Races in bold indicate pole position) (Races in italics indicate fastest lap)

Year	Team	1	2	3	4	5	6	7	8	9	10	11	12	Pos	Points
2024	Schumacher CLRT	CAT; 1; 8	CAT; 2; 8	LEC; 1; 3	LEC; 2; 8	SPA; 1; 7	SPA; 2; 5	DIJ; 1; 5	DIJ; 2; 5	MUG; 1; 4	MUG; 2; 3	ALG; 1; 3	ALG; 2; 3	4th	151
2025	CLRT Schumacher	CAT; 1; 6	CAT; 2; 6	**DIJ**; **1**; 2	DIJ; 2; 2	SPA; 1; 4	SPA; 2; 4	MIS; 1; 2	MIS; 2; 1	VAL; 1; 2	VAL; 2; 1	**LEC**; **1**; 18	**LEC**; **2**; 1	1st	208

^{*} Season still in progress.

=== Complete Porsche Carrera Cup Germany results ===
(key) (Races in bold indicate pole position) (Races in italics indicate fastest lap)

Year	Team	1	2	3	4	5	6	7	8	9	10	11	12	13	14	15	16	DC	Points
2026	Proton Competition	IMO; 1; 6	IMO; 2; 8	RBR; 1; 1	RBR; 2; 3	SPA; 1; 11	SPA; 2; 17	ZAN; 1; 6	ZAN; 2; 7	LAU; 1; 2	LAU; 2 Ret	NOR; 1	NOR; 2	NÜR; 1	NÜR; 2	HOC; 1	HOC; 2	6th*	104*

^{*}Season still in progress.

=== Complete Porsche Supercup results ===
(key) (Races in bold indicate pole position) (Races in italics indicate fastest lap)

Year	Team	1	2	3	4	5	6	7	8	Pos.	Points
2026	BWT Lechner Racing	MON; 11	CAT; 4	RBR; 12	SPA; 4	**HUN**; 1	ZAN; 1	ZAN; 2	MNZ	5th*	62*

^{*} Season still in progress.
