= 2023 Porsche Carrera Cup Germany =

Motor racing competition

Champions
- Drivers' Champion: Larry ten Voorde (overall); Parent series: Deutsche Tourenwagen Masters; ADAC GT Masters; ADAC support series: ADAC GT4 Germany

Seasons
- ← 2022 2024 →

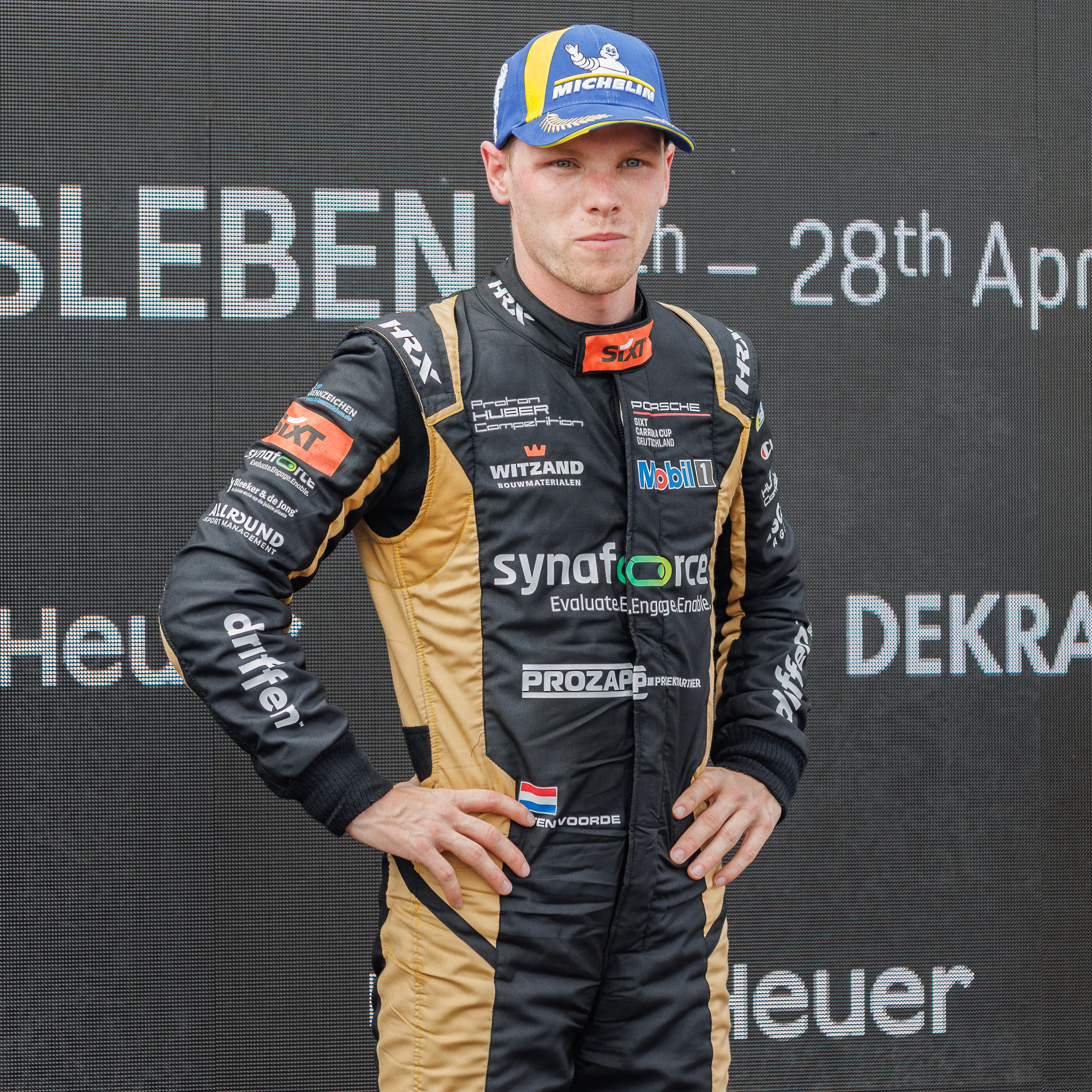
Larry ten Voorde (pictured in 2024) took his third Drivers' Championship title

The 2023 Porsche Carrera Cup Germany was the 38th season of the Porsche Carrera Cup Germany. The season began at Spa-Francorchamps on 27 April and ended at Hockenheim on 22 October. The races were held in Belgium, Germany, the Netherlands and Austria.

== Calendar ==
Round	Circuit	Date	Supporting
1	Circuit de Spa-Francorchamps, Stavelot, Belgium	27–29 April	FIA World Endurance Championship
2	Hockenheimring, Hockenheim, Germany	9–11 June	Festival of Dreams; ADAC GT Masters
3	Circuit Zandvoort, Zandvoort, Netherlands	23–25 June	Deutsche Tourenwagen Masters
4	(Germany) Nürburgring, Nürburg, Germany	4–6 August	Deutsche Tourenwagen Masters
5	Lausitzring, Klettwitz, Germany	18–20 August	Deutsche Tourenwagen Masters
6	Sachsenring, Hohenstein-Ernstthal, Germany	8–10 September	Deutsche Tourenwagen Masters
7	Red Bull Ring, Spielberg, Austria	22–24 September	Deutsche Tourenwagen Masters
8	Hockenheimring, Hockenheim, Germany	20–22 October	Deutsche Tourenwagen Masters

== Entry list ==
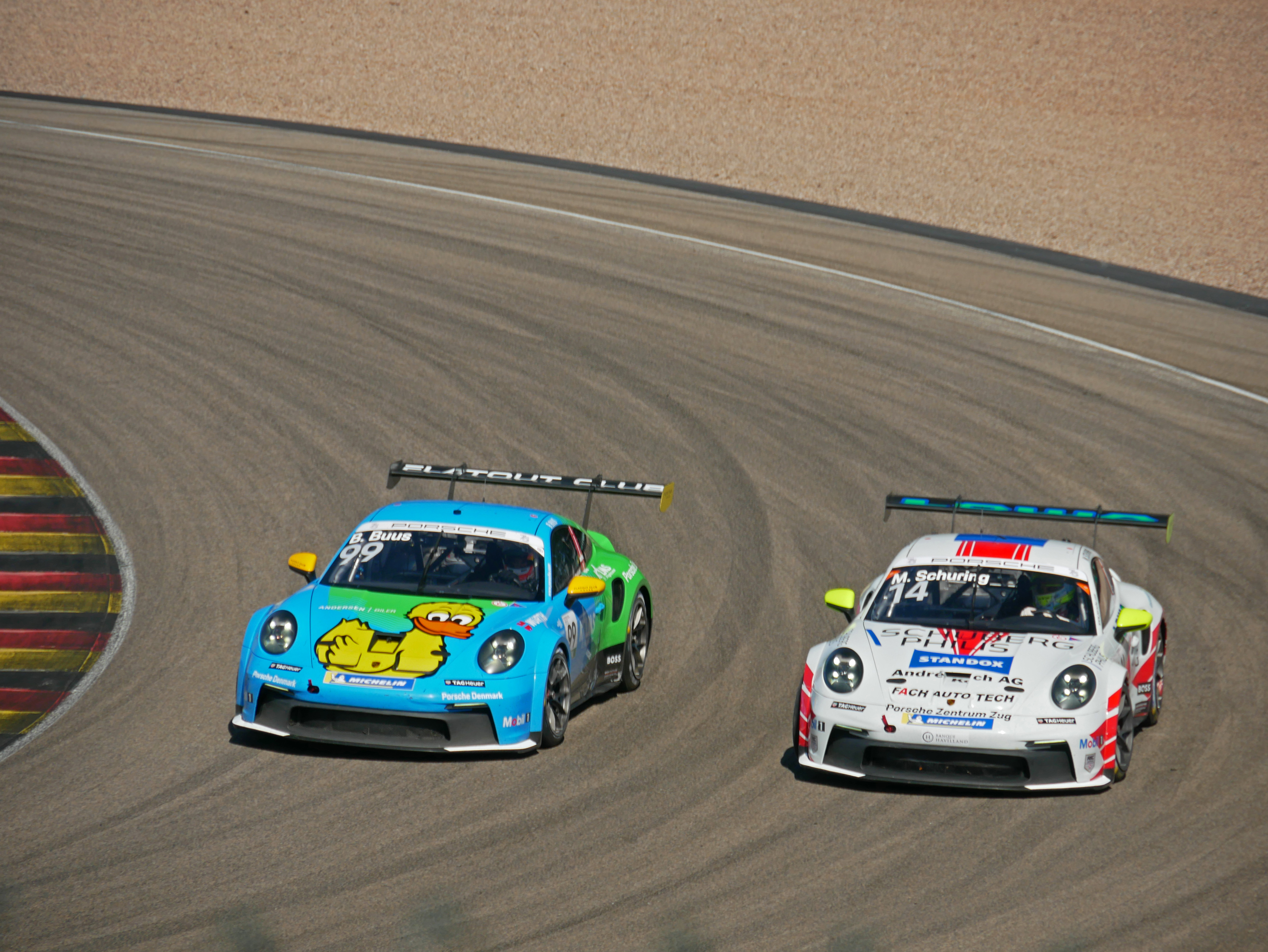
Bastian Buus (left) and Morris Schuring (right) won three and one race(s) respectively.

Team	No.	Driver	Class	Rounds
(Germany) ProfilDoors by Huber Racing (Note: Cars No. 4 and 44 entered as ProfilDoors by Huber Racing, cars No. 13, 77 and 92 entered as Huber Racing, cars No. 23 and 98 entered as HP Racing International by Huber and cars No. 31 and 87 entered as Team Huber Racing) (Germany) Huber Racing (Note: Cars No. 4 and 44 entered as ProfilDoors by Huber Racing, cars No. 13, 77 and 92 entered as Huber Racing, cars No. 23 and 98 entered as HP Racing International by Huber and cars No. 31 and 87 entered as Team Huber Racing) (Austria) HP Racing International by Huber (Note: Cars No. 4 and 44 entered as ProfilDoors by Huber Racing, cars No. 13, 77 and 92 entered as Huber Racing, cars No. 23 and 98 entered as HP Racing International by Huber and cars No. 31 and 87 entered as Team Huber Racing) (Germany) Team Huber Racing (Note: Cars No. 4 and 44 entered as ProfilDoors by Huber Racing, cars No. 13, 77 and 92 entered as Huber Racing, cars No. 23 and 98 entered as HP Racing International by Huber and cars No. 31 and 87 entered as Team Huber Racing)	4	(Bulgaria) Georgi Donchev	PA	All
(Germany) ProfilDoors by Huber Racing (Germany) Huber Racing (Austria) HP Racing International by Huber (Germany) Team Huber Racing	13	(Germany) Alexander Tauscher	P	All
(Germany) ProfilDoors by Huber Racing (Germany) Huber Racing (Austria) HP Racing International by Huber (Germany) Team Huber Racing	23	(Germany) Lukas Ertl	P	1–3
(Germany) ProfilDoors by Huber Racing (Germany) Huber Racing (Austria) HP Racing International by Huber (Germany) Team Huber Racing	31	(Germany) Sebastian Freymuth	P	All
(Germany) ProfilDoors by Huber Racing (Germany) Huber Racing (Austria) HP Racing International by Huber (Germany) Team Huber Racing	44	(Germany) Jonas Greif	P	All
(Germany) ProfilDoors by Huber Racing (Germany) Huber Racing (Austria) HP Racing International by Huber (Germany) Team Huber Racing	77	(Germany) Leon Köhler	P	1–4
(Germany) ProfilDoors by Huber Racing (Germany) Huber Racing (Austria) HP Racing International by Huber (Germany) Team Huber Racing	87	(Israel) Ariel Levi	P	All
(Germany) ProfilDoors by Huber Racing (Germany) Huber Racing (Austria) HP Racing International by Huber (Germany) Team Huber Racing	92	(Austria) Luca Rettenbacher	P	1–4
(Germany) ProfilDoors by Huber Racing (Germany) Huber Racing (Austria) HP Racing International by Huber (Germany) Team Huber Racing	98	(Germany) Jan Seyffert	P	1–4
(Netherlands) GP Elite (Note: Cars No. 5 and 27 entered as GP Elite and cars No. 24, 25 and 28 entered as Team GP Elite.) (Netherlands) Team GP Elite (Note: Cars No. 5 and 27 entered as GP Elite and cars No. 24, 25 and 28 entered as Team GP Elite.)	5	(Germany) Sören Spreng	PA	All
(Netherlands) GP Elite (Netherlands) Team GP Elite	24	(Netherlands) Loek Hartog	P	All
(Netherlands) GP Elite (Netherlands) Team GP Elite	25	(Netherlands) Larry ten Voorde	P	All
(Netherlands) GP Elite (Netherlands) Team GP Elite	27	(Belgium) Ghislain Cordeel	R	All
(Netherlands) GP Elite (Netherlands) Team GP Elite	28	(Netherlands) Huub van Eijndhoven	P	All
(Germany) Allied-Racing	6	(Germany) Vincent Andronaco	R	All
(Germany) Allied-Racing	19	(United Kingdom) Harry King	P	All
(Germany) Allied-Racing	99	(Denmark) Bastian Buus	P	All
(Switzerland) Fach Auto Tech	7	(Switzerland) Jasin Ferati	R	All
(Switzerland) Fach Auto Tech	8	(Switzerland) Alexander Fach	P	All
(Switzerland) Fach Auto Tech	14	(Netherlands) Morris Schuring	P	All
(Netherlands) JW Raceservice	10	(Netherlands) Lucas van Eijndhoven	R	8
(Germany) HRT Performance	11	(Germany) Luka Wlömer	R	2
(Germany) HRT Performance	17	(Sweden) Gutav Bergström	R	8
(Germany) HRT Performance	64	(Netherlands) Robert de Haan	R	3
(Germany) HRT Performance	65	(Germany) Kai Pfister	PA	1, 4–8
(Germany) HRT Performance	68	(Germany) Tim Stender	R	All
(Germany) HRT Performance	69	(Germany) Holger Harmsen	PA	All
(Germany) Scherer Sport PHX	12	(Australia) Harri Jones	R	All
(Germany) Scherer Sport PHX	22	(Switzerland) Matteo Ferrer-Aza	P	All
(Italy) Dinamic Motorsport	15	(Italy) Aldo Festante	R	8
(Germany) SRS Team Sorg Rennsport	33	(Switzerland) Felix Hirsiger	R	4
(Germany) CarTech Motorsport Bonk	34	(Germany) Theo Oeverhaus	R	All
(Germany) CarTech Motorsport Bonk	54	(Germany) Michael Essmann	PA	All
(Germany) CarTech Motorsport Bonk	84	(Kuwait) Ahmad Alshehab	PA	All
(Germany) ID Racing	40	(Germany) Janne Stiak	R	All
(Germany) ID Racing	41	(Italy) Diego Stifter	R	1–2, 4
(Germany) ID Racing	45	(Germany) Christof Langer	PA	6, 8
(Germany) ID Racing	46	(Belgium) Glenn van Parijs	P	3
(Estonia) EST 1 Racing	47	(Estonia) Alexander Reimann	R	6
(Germany) Proton Competition	55	(Italy) Lorenzo Ferrari	R	1
(Germany) Proton Competition	66	(United Kingdom) Adam Smalley	R	2–4
(Germany) Proton Competition	77	(Germany) Leon Köhler	P	5–8
(Germany) Proton Competition	88	(Austria) Horst Felix Felbermayr	R	All
(Austria) HP Racing International	98	(Germany) Jan Seyffert	P	5–8

Icon	Class
P	Pro Cup
R	Rookie
PA	Pro-Am Cup
	Guest Starter

== Results ==
Round		Circuit	Pole position	Fastest lap	Overall winner	Winning team	Rookie winner	ProAm winner
1	R1	(Belgium) Circuit de Spa-Francorchamps	(United Kingdom) Harry King	(United Kingdom) Harry King	(United Kingdom) Harry King	(Germany) Allied-Racing	(Australia) Harri Jones	(Bulgaria) Georgi Donchev
1	R2	(Belgium) Circuit de Spa-Francorchamps	(Netherlands) Larry ten Voorde	(Netherlands) Loek Hartog	(Netherlands) Loek Hartog	(Netherlands) Team GP Elite	(Germany) Theo Oeverhaus	(Bulgaria) Georgi Donchev
2	R1	(Germany) Hockenheimring	(Netherlands) Loek Hartog	(Netherlands) Larry ten Voorde	(Netherlands) Larry ten Voorde	(Netherlands) Team GP Elite	(Germany) Theo Oeverhaus	(Germany) Sören Spreng
2	R2	(Germany) Hockenheimring	(Netherlands) Loek Hartog	(Netherlands) Loek Hartog	(Netherlands) Loek Hartog	(Netherlands) Team GP Elite	(Germany) Theo Oeverhaus	(Kuwait) Ahmad Alshehab
3	R1	(Netherlands) Circuit Zandvoort	(Netherlands) Larry ten Voorde	(Netherlands) Larry ten Voorde	(Netherlands) Larry ten Voorde	(Netherlands) Team GP Elite	(Netherlands) Robert de Haan	(Germany) Sören Spreng
3	R2	(Netherlands) Circuit Zandvoort	(Netherlands) Larry ten Voorde	(Denmark) Bastian Buus	(Netherlands) Larry ten Voorde	(Netherlands) Team GP Elite	(Netherlands) Robert de Haan	(Germany) Sören Spreng
4	R1	(Germany) Nürburgring	(Netherlands) Larry ten Voorde	(Netherlands) Larry ten Voorde	(Netherlands) Larry ten Voorde	(Netherlands) Team GP Elite	(Switzerland) Jasin Ferati	(Germany) Sören Spreng
4	R2	(Germany) Nürburgring	(Netherlands) Larry ten Voorde	(Netherlands) Larry ten Voorde	(Netherlands) Larry ten Voorde	(Netherlands) Team GP Elite	(Germany) Vincent Andronaco	(Germany) Sören Spreng
5	R1	(Germany) Lausitzring	(Netherlands) Loek Hartog	(United Kingdom) Harry King	(Netherlands) Loek Hartog	(Netherlands) Team GP Elite	(Germany) Vincent Andronaco	(Germany) Sören Spreng
5	R2	(Germany) Lausitzring	(Netherlands) Loek Hartog	(Denmark) Bastian Buus	(Denmark) Bastian Buus	(Germany) Allied-Racing	(Germany) Theo Oeverhaus	(Kuwait) Ahmad Alshehab
6	R1	(Germany) Sachsenring	(Netherlands) Morris Schuring	(Denmark) Bastian Buus	(Denmark) Bastian Buus	(Germany) Allied-Racing	(Germany) Theo Oeverhaus	(Kuwait) Ahmad Alshehab
6	R2	(Germany) Sachsenring	(Denmark) Bastian Buus	(Netherlands) Morris Schuring	(Netherlands) Morris Schuring	(Switzerland) Fach Auto Tech	(Germany) Vincent Andronaco	(Bulgaria) Georgi Donchev
7	R1	(Austria) Red Bull Ring	(Netherlands) Loek Hartog	(Denmark) Bastian Buus	(Netherlands) Larry ten Voorde	(Netherlands) Team GP Elite	(Germany) Theo Oeverhaus	(Germany) Sören Spreng
7	R2	(Austria) Red Bull Ring	(Netherlands) Loek Hartog	(Denmark) Bastian Buus	(Denmark) Bastian Buus	(Germany) Allied-Racing	(Germany) Theo Oeverhaus	(Kuwait) Ahmad Alshehab
8	R1	(Germany) Hockenheimring	(Netherlands) Larry ten Voorde	(Netherlands) Loek Hartog	(Netherlands) Loek Hartog	(Netherlands) Team GP Elite	(Germany) Theo Oeverhaus	(Germany) Michael Essmann
8	R2	(Germany) Hockenheimring	(Netherlands) Larry ten Voorde	(Netherlands) Loek Hartog	(Netherlands) Larry ten Voorde	(Netherlands) Team GP Elite	(Germany) Theo Oeverhaus	(Kuwait) Ahmad Alshehab

== Standings ==
=== Scoring system ===
Points were awarded to the first 15 classified drivers in the following number. Guest drivers' points were eliminated at the end of the season, so identical positions may have different point values:

Position	1st	2nd	3rd	4th	5th	6th	7th	8th	9th	10th	11th	12th	13th	14th	15th
Points	25	20	16	13	11	10	9	8	7	6	5	4	3	2	1

=== Overall ===
Pos.	Driver	Team	SPA (Belgium)		HOC (Germany)		ZND (Netherlands)		NÜR (Germany)		LAU (Germany)		SAC (Germany)		RBR (Austria)		HOC (Germany)		Points
Pos.	Driver	Team	R1	R2	R1	R2	R1	R2	R1	R2	R1	R2	R1	R2	R1	R2	R1	R2	Points
1	(Netherlands) Larry ten Voorde	(Netherlands) Team GP Elite	2	2	1	3	1	1	1	1	2	3	3	2	1	5	3	1	330
2	(Netherlands) Loek Hartog	(Netherlands) Team GP Elite	3	1	2	1	5	11	4	7	1	Ret	4	4	5	2	1	2	251
3	(Denmark) Bastian Buus	(Germany) Allied-Racing	4	5	Ret	4	2	2	6	2	3	1	1	3	3	1	7	Ret	239
4	(United Kingdom) Harry King	(Germany) Allied-Racing	1	4	3	2	3	4	2	9	4	2	13	9	2	3	6	25	219
5	(Netherlands) Morris Schuring	(Switzerland) Fach Auto Tech	DSQ	3	4	10	12	7	5	5	5	4	2	1	13	4	4	4	181
6	(Germany) Leon Köhler	(Austria) HP Racing International by Huber (Note: Rounds 1-4) (Germany) Proton Competition (Note: Rounds 5-8)	8	10	5	Ret	8	26	3	3	Ret	10	21	5	4	6	8	Ret	113
7	(Germany) Theo Oeverhaus	(Germany) CarTech Motorsport Bonk	7	6	7	5	22	13	Ret	13	Ret	5	5	10	6	8	5	5	113
8	(Netherlands) Huub van Eijndhoven	(Netherlands) Team GP Elite	15	11	6	9	18	6	9	12	7	7	Ret	6	10	Ret	2	9	105
9	(Germany) Alexander Tauscher	(Austria) HP Racing International by Huber	DSQ	DSQ	27	8	16	15	8	4	Ret	6	6	11	7	7	14	3	91
10	(Switzerland) Alexander Fach	(Switzerland) Fach Auto Tech	DSQ	Ret	8	7	6	8	7	21	18	12	7	22	8	10	11	8	84
11	(Germany) Vincent Andronaco	(Germany) Allied-Racing	6	12	10	Ret	Ret	5	27	6	6	Ret	8	7	Ret	9	18	Ret	75
12	(Australia) Harri Jones	(Germany) Scherer Sport PHX	5	7	25	6	15	10	14	DSQ	15	11	11	8	9	Ret	16	6	75
13	(Israel) Ariel Levi	(Germany) Team Huber Racing	13	9	Ret	Ret	Ret	9	11	11	Ret	8	9	Ret	11	11	9	15	60
14	(Belgium) Ghislain Cordeel	(Netherlands) GP Elite	10	13	12	Ret	7	12	30	WD	8	9	Ret	23	12	16	WD	WD	45
15	(Germany) Janne Stiak	(Germany) ID Racing	Ret	15	19	14	11	16	17	8	14	13	10	12	15	15	10	12	43
16	(Germany) Sebastian Freymuth	(Germany) Team Huber Racing	11	14	11	12	10	23	18	14	10	17	12	14	26	13	13	Ret	42
17	(Switzerland) Jasin Ferati	(Switzerland) Fach Auto Tech	DSQ	19	14	17	17	14	13	10	9	14	Ret	15	14	12	15	10	36
18	(Netherlands) Robert de Haan	(Germany) HRT Performance					4	3											29
19	(Germany) Jan Seyffert	(Austria) HP Racing International by Huber (Note: Rounds 1-4) (Austria) HP Racing International (Note: Rounds 5-8)	Ret	26	28	Ret	14	30	12	18	11	15	14	16	19	14	12	7	29
20	(Austria) Luca Rettenbacher	(Germany) Huber Racing	9	8	27	Ret	13	20	10	23									24
21	(Germany) Lukas Ertl	(Austria) HP Racing International by Huber	17	17	9	11	Ret	18											12
22	(Austria) Horst Felix Felbermayr	(Germany) Proton Competition	20	DNS	18	13	23	19	15	26	13	Ret	19	Ret	17	Ret	27	13	10
23	(Belgium) Glenn van Parijs	(Germany) ID Racing					9	17											7
24	(Kuwait) Ahmad Alshehab	(Germany) CarTech Motorsport Bonk	Ret	20	22	16	20	28	21	17	16	18	15	Ret	20	17	28	11	6
25	(Germany) Sören Spreng	(Netherlands) GP Elite	21	21	15	Ret	19	21	19	15	12	23	25	Ret	16	18	30	17	6
26	(Italy) Lorenzo Ferrari	(Germany) Proton Competition	12	23															4
27	(Bulgaria) Georgi Donchev	(Germany) ProfilDoors by Huber Racing	14	18	20	19	27	27	23	19	Ret	21	17	17	18	20	26	14	4
28	(Switzerland) Matteo Ferrer-Aza	(Germany) Scherer Sport PHX	22	25	16	20	21	24	25	DSQ	20	19	18	13	21	22	19	19	3
29	(Germany) Jonas Greif	(Germany) ProfilDoors by Huber Racing	18	Ret	13	Ret	Ret	Ret	20	Ret	19	16	20	Ret	22	19	22	24	3
30	(Germany) Luka Wlömer	(Germany) HRT Performance			21	15													1
31	(Germany) Michael Essmann	(Germany) CarTech Motorsport Bonk	Ret	22	17	24	24	22	26	DSQ	22	22	16	Ret	24	Ret	24	18	0
32	(Germany) Tim Stender	(Germany) HRT Performance	23	27	24	18	25	25	24	20	17	20	Ret	Ret	23	23	Ret	21	0
33	(Germany) Christof Langer	(Germany) ID Racing											24	18			29	23	0
34	(Germany) Kai Pfister	(Germany) HRT Performance	24	28					28	22	21	24	22	19	25	21	23	22	0
35	(Italy) Diego Stifter	(Germany) ID Racing	19	24	23	21			22	Ret									0
36	(Germany) Holger Harmsen	(Germany) HRT Performance	25	29	26	22	26	29	29	25	23	25	26	21	27	Ret	24	26	0
37	(United Kingdom) Adam Smalley	(Germany) Proton Competition			Ret	23	Ret	WD	Ret	24									0
Guest drivers ineligible to score Points
	(Switzerland) Felix Hirsiger	(Germany) SRS Team Sorg Rennsport							16	16									
	(Sweden) Gutav Bergström	(Germany) HRT Performance															20	16	
	(Netherlands) Lucas van Eijndhoven	(Netherlands) JW Raceservice															17	27	
	(Estonia) Alexander Reimann	(Estonia) EST 1 Racing											23	20					
	(Italy) Aldo Festante	(Italy) Dinamic Motorsport															25	20	
Pos.	Driver	Team	R1	R2	R1	R2	R1	R2	R1	R2	R1	R2	R1	R2	R1	R2	R1	R2	Points
Pos.	Driver	Team	SPA (Belgium)		HOC (Germany)		ZND (Netherlands)		NÜR (Germany)		LAU (Germany)		SAC (Germany)		RBR (Austria)		HOC (Germany)		Points

=== Rookie ===
Pos.	Driver	Team	SPA (Belgium)		HOC (Germany)		ZND (Netherlands)		NÜR (Germany)		LAU (Germany)		SAC (Germany)		RBR (Austria)		HOC (Germany)		Points
Pos.	Driver	Team	R1	R2	R1	R2	R1	R2	R1	R2	R1	R2	R1	R2	R1	R2	R1	R2	Points
1	(Germany) Theo Oeverhaus	(Germany) CarTech Motorsport Bonk	3	1	1	1	6	5	Ret	4	Ret	1	1	3	1	1	1	1	291
2	(Australia) Harri Jones	(Germany) Scherer Sport PHX	1	2	10	2	4	3	2	DSQ	6	3	4	2	2	Ret	4	2	232
3	(Germany) Vincent Andronaco	(Germany) Allied-Racing	2	3	2	Ret	Ret	2	7	1	1	Ret	2	1	Ret	2	5	Ret	211
4	(Germany) Janne Stiak	(Germany) ID Racing	Ret	5	6	4	3	7	4	2	5	4	3	4	5	4	2	4	202
5	(Switzerland) Jasin Ferati	(Switzerland) Fach Auto Tech	DSQ	8	4	6	5	6	1	3	3	5	Ret	5	4	3	3	3	192
6	(Belgium) Ghislain Cordeel	(Netherlands) GP Elite	4	4	3	Ret	2	4	8	WD	2	2	Ret	6	3	5	WD	WD	160
7	(Austria) Horst Felix Felbermayr	(Germany) Proton Competition	7	DNS	5	3	7	8	3	7	4	Ret	5	Ret	6	Ret	6	5	133
8	(Germany) Tim Stender	(Germany) HRT Performance	8	9	9	7	8	9	6	5	7	6	Ret	Ret	7	6	Ret	6	115
9	(Netherlands) Robert de Haan	(Germany) HRT Performance					1	1											50
10	(Italy) Diego Stifter	(Germany) ID Racing	6	7	8	8			5	Ret									46
11	(Italy) Lorenzo Ferrari	(Germany) Proton Competition	5	6															21
12	(Germany) Luka Wlömer	(Germany) HRT Performance			7	5													20
13	(United Kingdom) Adam Smalley	(Germany) Proton Competition			Ret	9	Ret	WD	Ret	6									17
Pos.	Driver	Team	R1	R2	R1	R2	R1	R2	R1	R2	R1	R2	R1	R2	R1	R2	R1	R2	Points
Pos.	Driver	Team	SPA (Belgium)		HOC (Germany)		ZND (Netherlands)		NÜR (Germany)		LAU (Germany)		SAC (Germany)		RBR (Austria)		HOC (Germany)		Points

=== ProAm ===
Pos.	Driver	Team	SPA (Belgium)		HOC (Germany)		ZND (Netherlands)		NÜR (Germany)		LAU (Germany)		SAC (Germany)		RBR (Austria)		HOC (Germany)		Points
Pos.	Driver	Team	R1	R2	R1	R2	R1	R2	R1	R2	R1	R2	R1	R2	R1	R2	R1	R2	Points
1	(Germany) Sören Spreng	(Netherlands) GP Elite	2	3	1	Ret	1	1	1	1	1	4	6	Ret	1	2	7	3	279
2	(Kuwait) Ahmad Alshehab	(Germany) CarTech Motorsport Bonk	Ret	2	4	1	2	4	2	2	2	1	1	Ret	3	1	5	1	278
3	(Bulgaria) Georgi Donchev	(Germany) ProfilDoors by Huber Racing	1	1	3	2	5	3	3	3	Ret	2	3	1	2	3	4	2	275
4	(Germany) Michael Essmann	(Germany) CarTech Motorsport Bonk	Ret	4	2	4	3	2	4	DSQ	4	3	2	Ret	4	Ret	1	4	195
5	(Germany) Holger Harmsen	(Germany) HRT Performance	4	6	5	3	4	5	6	5	5	6	7	4	6	Ret	3	7	173
6	(Germany) Kai Pfister	(Germany) HRT Performance	3	5					5	4	3	5	4	3	5	4	2	5	162
7	(Germany) Christof Langer	(Germany) ID Racing											5	2			6	6	51
Pos.	Driver	Team	R1	R2	R1	R2	R1	R2	R1	R2	R1	R2	R1	R2	R1	R2	R1	R2	Points
Pos.	Driver	Team	SPA (Belgium)		HOC (Germany)		ZND (Netherlands)		NÜR (Germany)		LAU (Germany)		SAC (Germany)		RBR (Austria)		HOC (Germany)		Points

=== Team ===
Pos	Team	Pts
1	(Netherlands) Team GP Elite	600
2	(Germany) Allied-Racing	478
3	(Switzerland) Fach Auto Tech	294
4	(Germany) Huber Racing	182
5	(Germany) CarTech Motorsport Bonk	139
6	(Germany) Team Huber Racing	128
7	(Germany) Scherer Sport PHX	93
8	(Netherlands) GP Elite	73
9	(Germany) Proton Competition	72
10	(Germany) ID Racing	72
11	(Austria) HP Racing International	60
12	(Germany) HRT Performance	32
13	(Germany) ProfilDoors by Huber Racing	17

== See also ==
- 2023 Porsche Supercup
