= Theo Oeverhaus =

German racing driver

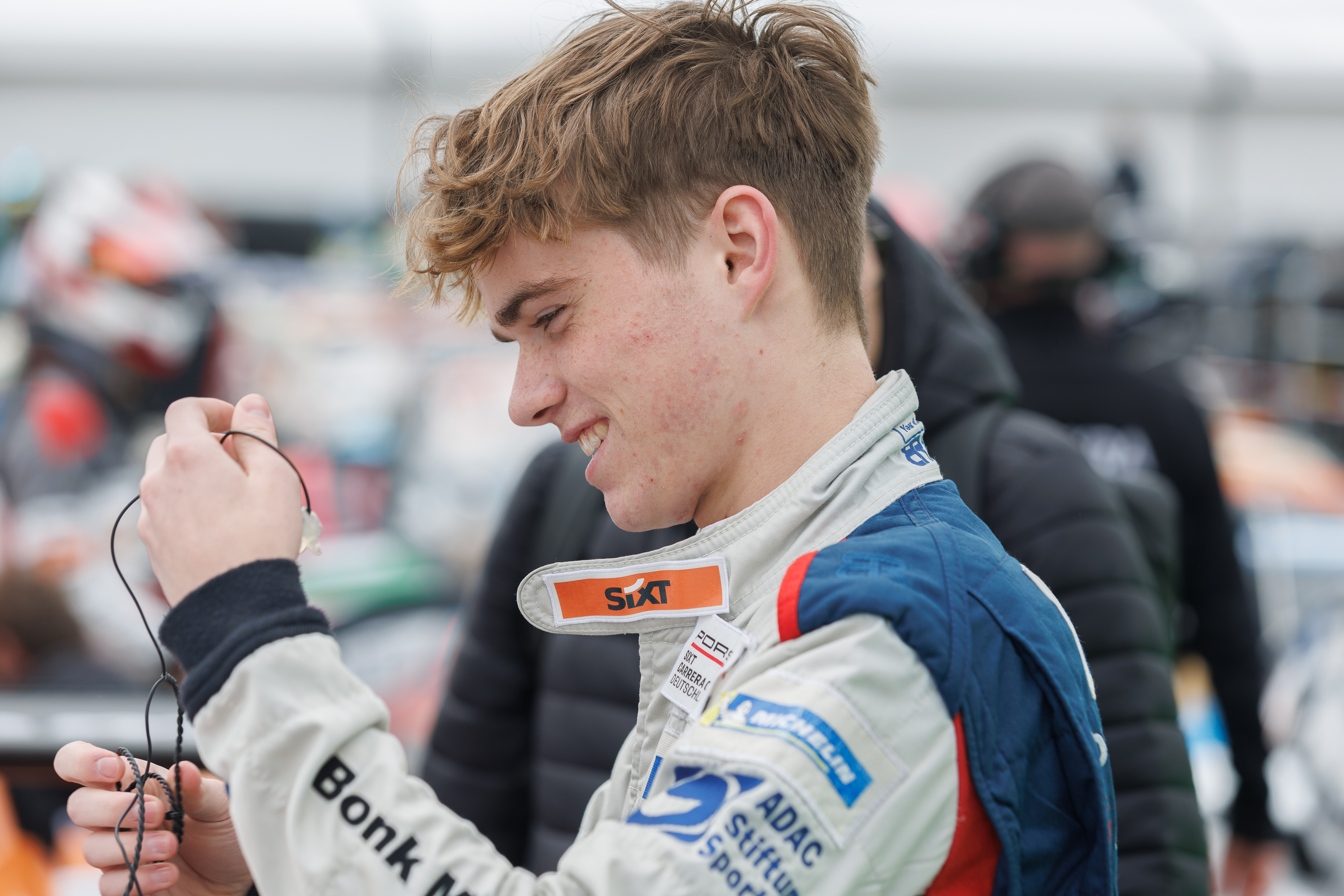
- Oeverhaus in 2024
- Nationality: (Germany) German
- Born: 18 December 2004 (age 21) Osnabrück, Germany

Porsche Supercup career
- Debut season: 2024
- Current team: Martinet by Alméras
- Categorisation: FIA Silver
- Car number: 15
- Former teams: BWT Lechner Racing, Proton Huber Competition
- Starts: 18 (18 entries)
- Wins: 1
- Podiums: 4
- Poles: 2
- Fastest laps: 0
- Best finish: 7th in 2025

Theo Oeverhaus (born 18 December 2004) is a German racing driver who currently competes in several Porsche Carrera Cup series including Supercup and Carrera Cup Germany. He is a protégé of Jörg Müller and made a guest start in Deutsche Tourenwagen Masters at the age of 17.

== Career ==
=== Karting ===
Oeverhaus started karting at the age of 12. He mainly competed in German championships including the ADAC Kart Cup and the ADAC Kart Bundeslauf. In 2019 he finished fourth in the ADAC Kart Bundeslauf.

=== Cup racing ===
Oeverhaus made his car racing debut in 2020 by competing in the DMV BMW 318ti Cup. He finished the season as runner-up.

=== DTM Trophy ===
In 2021, Oeverhaus made his debut in the DTM Trophy with Walkenhorst Motorsport. He took his first race win at the Hockenheimring and finished the season in sixth.

In 2022, Oeverhaus competed in the DTM Trophy with Walkenhorst Motorsport once again. He took his only race win of the season in a chaotic race at the Norisring which only ten cars finished. He also scored five other podiums on his way to finish third in the championship.

=== ADAC GT4 Germany ===
In 2022, Oeverhaus also competed in the ADAC GT4 Germany for CV Performance Group after being drafted in shortly before the season began to replace Leon Koslowski. He took two podiums at Circuit Zandvoort and finished the season in fifteenth.

=== GT World Challenge Europe Endurance Cup ===
In 2022, Oeverhaus took part in his first race in GT3 machinery at the 24 Hours of Spa with Walkenhorst Motorsport. Together with his teammates Jörg Breuer, Henry Walkenhorst and Don Yount, he finished second in the Bronze-class and 37th overall.

=== Deutsche Tourenwagen Masters ===
In 2022, Oeverhaus made his debut in the Deutsche Tourenwagen Masters with Walkenhorst Motorsport at the age of 17. He competed in the Nürburgring round as a guest driver. He finished in the top-20 in both races. Oeverhaus held the record for the youngest DTM driver until Tom Kalender beat it in 2025.

== Racing record ==
=== Career summary ===
Season	Series	Team	Races	Wins	Poles	F/Laps	Podiums	Points	Position
2020	DMV BMW 318ti Cup	Hampl Motors Rennsport	13	2	2	8	10	334	**2nd**
2021	DTM Trophy	Walkenhorst Motorsport	14	1	0	0	3	119	6th
2021	BMW M2 Cup Germany	Project 1	2	0	0	1	1	17	19th
2022	ADAC GT4 Germany	CV Performance Group	8	0	0	0	2	62	15th
2022	DTM Trophy	Walkenhorst Motorsport	14	1	1	1	6	158	**3rd**
2022	GT World Challenge Europe Endurance Cup	Walkenhorst Motorsport	1	0	0	0	0	0	NC
2022	Deutsche Tourenwagen Masters	Walkenhorst Motorsport	2	0	0	0	0	0	NC†
2023	Porsche Carrera Cup Germany	CarTech Motorsport Bonk	16	0	0	0	0	113	7th
2023	Nürburgring Endurance Series - VT3	Team Mathol Racing e.V.	3	3	3	3	3	0	NC†
2023–24	Porsche Carrera Cup Middle East	DHL Team	12	7	8	6	9	243	**1st**
2024	Porsche Supercup	BWT Lechner Racing	8	0	0	0	0	38	11th
2024	Porsche Carrera Cup Germany	Bonk Motorsport	16	1	2	1	5	191	**3rd**
2025	Middle East Trophy - 992	Duel Racing by Huber							
2025	Porsche Carrera Cup Germany	Bonk Motorsport	16	0	0	0	4	153	8th
2025	Porsche Carrera Cup France	Martinet by Alméras	2	2	2	1	2	53	11th
2025	Porsche Supercup	Proton Huber Competition	8	1	1	0	2	68	7th
2026	Porsche Carrera Cup France	Martinet by Alméras							
2026	Porsche Supercup	Martinet by Alméras	8	1	1	0	2	95	**3rd**
2026	Porsche Carrera Cup Germany	ID Racing	16	2	2	0	6	204	**3rd**

† As Oeverhaus was a guest driver, he was ineligible to score points.
* Season still in progress

=== Complete Deutsche Tourenwagen Masters results ===
(key) (Races in bold indicate pole position) (Races in italics indicate fastest lap)

Year	Team	Car	1	2	3	4	5	6	7	8	9	10	11	12	13	14	15	16	Pos	Points
2022	Walkenhorst Motorsport	BMW M4 GT3	ALG; 1	ALG; 2	LAU; 1	LAU; 2	IMO; 1	IMO; 2	NOR; 1	NOR; 2	NÜR; 1; 19	NÜR; 2; 18	SPA; 1	SPA; 2	RBR; 1	RBR; 2	HOC; 1	HOC; 2	NC†	0†

^{†} As Oeverhaus was a guest driver, he was ineligible to score points.

=== Complete Porsche Carrera Cup Germany results ===
(key) (Races in bold indicate pole position) (Races in italics indicate fastest lap)

Year	Team	1	2	3	4	5	6	7	8	9	10	11	12	13	14	15	16	DC	Points
2023	CarTech Motorsport Bonk	SPA; 1; 7	SPA; 2; 6	HOC1; 1; 7	HOC1; 2; 5	ZAN; 1; 22	ZAN; 2; 13	NÜR; 1 Ret	NÜR; 2; 13	LAU; 1 Ret	LAU; 2; 5	SAC; 1; 5	SAC; 2; 10	RBR; 1; 6	RBR; 2; 8	HOC2; 1; 5	HOC2; 2; 5	7th	113
2024	Bonk Motorsport	IMO; 1; 6	**IMO**; **2** Ret	OSC; 1; 4	OSC; 2; 4	ZAN; 1; 3	ZAN; 2; 3	HUN; 1; 4	HUN; 2; 2	NÜR; 1; 4	NÜR; 2; 11	**SAC**; **1**; 1	SAC; 2; 4	RBR; 1; 9	RBR; 2; 9	HOC; 1 Ret	HOC; 2; 2	3rd	191
2025	Bonk Motorsport	IMO; 1; 2	IMO; 2; 11	SPA; 1; 2	SPA; 2; 8	ZAN; 1; 8	ZAN; 2; 24†	NOR; 1; 5	NOR; 2; 6	NÜR; 1; 2	NÜR; 2; 3	SAC; 1; 8	SAC; 2; 7	RBR; 1; 15	RBR; 2; 10	HOC; 1; 28	HOC; 2; 6	8th	153
2026	ID Racing	**IMO**; **1**; 1	**IMO**; **2**; 1	RBR; 1; 19	RBR; 2; 6	SPA; 1; 2	SPA; 2; 2	ZAN; 1; 7	ZAN; 2; 3	LAU; 1; 4	LAU; 2; 2	NOR; 1; 8	NOR; 2; 7	NÜR; 1; 18	NÜR; 2; 8	HOC; 1; 5	HOC; 2; 6	3rd	204

^{*} Season still in progress.

=== Complete Porsche Supercup results ===
(key) (Races in bold indicate pole position; races in italics indicate fastest lap)

Year	Team	1	2	3	4	5	6	7	8	Pos.	Points
2024	BWT Lechner Racing	IMO; 5	MON; 12	RBR; 7	SIL; 11	HUN; 17	SPA; 17	ZND; 18	MNZ; 13	11th	38
2025	Proton Huber Competition	**IMO**; 1	MON; 2‡	CAT; 9	RBR; Ret	SPA; 13	HUN; 14	ZAN; 7	MNZ; 6	7th	68
2026	Martinet by Alméras	**MON**; 1	CAT; 3	RBR; 6	SPA; 6	HUN; 9	ZAN; 1; 6	ZAN; 2; 6	MNZ; 8	3rd	95

^{‡} Half points awarded as less than 75% of race distance was completed.
^{*} Season still in progress.
