= 2025 Porsche Carrera Cup Italia =

Motor racing event held in Italy

The 2025 Porsche Carrera Cup Italia was a motor racing championship held in Italy. It wwas the 19th season of the Porsche Carrera Cup Italia. The season began at Misano World Circuit Marco Simoncelli on 2 May and ended at Autodromo Nazionale di Monza on 26 October.

== Calendar ==
| Round | Circuit | Date | Supporting | Map of circuit locations |
|---|---|---|---|---|
| 1 | Misano World Circuit Marco Simoncelli, Misano Adriatico, Italy | 2–4 May | Italian GT Championship; Formula Regional European Championship; Italian F4 Championship; TCR Italy Touring Car Championship; Campionato Italiano Sport Prototipi | 2025 Porsche Carrera Cup Italia is located in Italy |
| 2 | Vallelunga Circuit, Campagnano di Roma, Italy | 6–8 June | Campionato Italiano Sport Prototipi; F2000 Italian Formula Trophy | 2025 Porsche Carrera Cup Italia is located in Italy |
| 3 | Mugello Circuit, Scarperia e San Piero, Italy | 11–13 July | Italian GT Championship; Italian F4 Championship; Campionato Italiano Sport Prototipi; F2000 Italian Formula Trophy | 2025 Porsche Carrera Cup Italia is located in Italy |
| 4 | Autodromo Enzo e Dino Ferrari, Imola, Italy | 26–28 September | Italian GT Championship; Campionato Italiano Sport Prototipi; Campionato Italiano Velocità in Circuito Auto Storiche; F2000 Italian Formula Trophy | 2025 Porsche Carrera Cup Italia is located in Italy |
| 5 | Misano World Circuit Marco Simoncelli, Misano Adriatico, Italy | 10–12 October | TCR Italy Touring Car Championship; Campionato Italiano Sport Prototipi; Mini Challenge | 2025 Porsche Carrera Cup Italia is located in Italy |
| 6 | Autodromo Nazionale di Monza, Monza, Italy | 24–26 October | Italian GT Championship; Formula Regional European Championship; E4 Championship; Campionato Italiano Velocità in Circuito Auto Storiche | 2025 Porsche Carrera Cup Italia is located in Italy |

== Entry list ==
| Team | No. | Driver | Class | Rounds |
|---|---|---|---|---|
| (Italy) Ebimotors | 3 | (Italy) Alberto Cerqui | P | All |
| (Italy) Ebimotors | 51 | (Italy) Paolo Gnemmi | M | 1, 3 |
| (Italy) Ebimotors | 52 | (Italy) Alberto de Amicis | M | All |
| (Italy) Ebimotors | 70 | (Italy) Gianluca Giorgi | M | 4 |
| (Italy) BeDriver | 5 | (France) Marvin Klein | P | 1, 3–6 |
| (Italy) BeDriver | 5 | (Germany) Lirim Zendeli | P | 2 |
| (Italy) BeDriver | 14 | (Netherlands) Huub van Eijndhoven | P | 1 |
| (Italy) BeDriver | 14 | (Belgium) Benjamin Paque | P | 2 |
| (Italy) BeDriver | 14 | (Germany) Lirim Zendeli | P | 3–6 |
| (Italy) BeDriver | 33 | (United Kingdom) James Wallis | P | 1 |
| (Italy) BeDriver | 33 | Sergey Titarenko | P | 3 |
| (Italy) BeDriver | 80 | (United Kingdom) Lee Mowle | M | All |
| (Italy) Target Competition | 6 | (Brazil) Matheus Ferreira | P R | 5 |
| (Italy) Target Competition | 7 | (Brazil) Matheus Ferreira | P R | 6 |
| (Italy) Target Competition | 7 | (Australia) Bayley Hall | P | 2 |
| (Italy) Target Competition | 7 | (Germany) Janne Stiak | P | 4 |
| (Italy) Target Competition | 7 | (Netherlands) Robert de Haan | P | 5 |
| (Italy) Target Competition | 9 | (Germany) Jan Seyffert | P R | 1, 3–6 |
| (Italy) Target Competition | 13 | (Germany) Alexander Tauscher | P | 1, 3–6 |
| (Italy) Target Competition | 30 | (Netherlands) Nathan Schaap | P R | All |
| (Italy) Target Competition | 92 | (Italy) Federico Paolino | M | 1 |
| (Italy) Team Q8 Hi-Perform | 8 | (South Africa) Keagan Masters | P | All |
| (Italy) The Driving Experiences | 10 | (Israel) Ariel Levi | P | 4–6 |
| (Italy) The Driving Experiences | 21 | (Italy) Diego Bertonelli | P | 1–3 |
| (Italy) The Driving Experiences | 22 | (Austria) Horst Felix Felbermayr | P | 4, 6 |
| (Italy) The Driving Experiences | 46 | (Italy) Nicolas Pujatti | P | All |
| (Italy) The Driving Experiences | 50 | (Italy) Francesco Maria Fenici | M | All |
| (Italy) Ombra Racing | 11 | (Italy) Francesco Braschi | P | All |
| (Italy) Ombra Racing | 12 | (Argentina) Luciano Martínez | P R | All |
| (Italy) Ombra Racing | 23 | (Italy) Matteo Segre | P R | All |
| (Italy) Dinamic Motorsport | 15 | (Italy) Aldo Festante | P | All |
| (Italy) Dinamic Motorsport | 25 | (San Marino) Lorenzo Cheli | P R | 3–5 |
| (Italy) Dinamic Motorsport | 25 | (Italy) Eugenio Pisani | P | 6 |
| (Italy) Dinamic Motorsport | 34 | (Netherlands) Dirk Schouten | P | All |
| (Italy) Dinamic Motorsport | 35 | (Italy) Pietro Delli Guanti | P R | 1–2 |
| (Italy) Enrico Fulgenzi Racing | 18 | (Italy) William Mezzetti | P R | All |
| (Italy) Enrico Fulgenzi Racing | 88 | (Italy) Andrea Girondi | M | All |
| (Italy) Malucelli Motorsport | 19 | (Denmark) Hjelte Hoffner | P R | All |
| (Italy) Malucelli Motorsport | 32 | (Italy) Gianmarco Quaresmini | P | All |
| (Italy) Malucelli Motorsport | 54 | (Italy) Stefano Stefanelli | M | All |
| (Italy) OMNIA Racing | 20 | (Turkey) Bati Yildirim | P R | All |
| (Italy) OMNIA Racing | 26 | (Italy) Mattia Marchiante | P R | 1–4, 6 |
| (Italy) Archesse Racing | 24 | (Italy) Filippo Fant | P | All |
| (Italy) Archesse Racing | 25 | (San Marino) Lorenzo Cheli | P R | 1–2 |
| (Italy) Archesse Racing | 35 | (Italy) Pietro Delli Guanti | P R | 3–6 |
| (Italy) Prima Ghinzani Motorsport | 27 | (Italy) Giuseppe Guirreri | P | All |
| (Italy) Prima Ghinzani Motorsport | 28 | (Italy) Giorgio Amati | P | All |
| (Italy) Prima Ghinzani Motorsport | 38 | (Italy) Simone Iaquinta | P | All |
| (Italy) Prima Ghinzani Motorsport | 56 | (Italy) Cesare Brusa | M | 1, 4, 6 |
| (Italy) Scuderia Villorba Corse | 67 | (Italy) Alex de Giacomi | M | 2–4 |
| (Italy) Scuderia Villorba Corse | 99 | (Japan) Makoto Haga | M | 4, 6 |

| Icon | Class |
|---|---|
| P | Pro Cup |
| R | Rookie |
| M | Michelin Cup |
| | Guest Starter |

- Charl Michel Visser was scheduled to compete for Target Competition, but did not enter any rounds.

== Race results ==
| Round | | Circuit | Pole position | Fastest lap | Overall winner | Winning team | Michelin Cup winner | Rookie winner |
|---|---|---|---|---|---|---|---|---|
| 1 | R1 | (Italy) Misano World Circuit Marco Simoncelli | (Germany) Alexander Tauscher | (South Africa) Keagan Masters | (Germany) Alexander Tauscher | (Italy) Target Competition | (Italy) Alberto de Amicis | (Italy) Pietro Delli Guanti |
| 1 | R2 | (Italy) Misano World Circuit Marco Simoncelli | (Italy) Simone Iaquinta | (Germany) Alexander Tauscher | (Germany) Alexander Tauscher | (Italy) Target Competition | (Italy) Alberto de Amicis | (Netherlands) Nathan Schaap |
| 2 | R1 | (Italy) Vallelunga Circuit | (South Africa) Keagan Masters | (South Africa) Keagan Masters | (South Africa) Keagan Masters | (Italy) Team Q8 Hi-Perform | (Italy) Alberto de Amicis | (Netherlands) Nathan Schaap |
| 2 | R2 | (Italy) Vallelunga Circuit | (South Africa) Keagan Masters | (South Africa) Keagan Masters | (South Africa) Keagan Masters | (Italy) Team Q8 Hi-Perform | (Italy) Alberto de Amicis | (Denmark) Hjelte Hoffner |
| 3 | R1 | (Italy) Mugello Circuit | (Italy) Francesco Braschi (Note: Marvin Klein set the fastest time in qualifying but received a 2-place grid penalty for breaching parc fermé rules. Francesco Braschi, who set the second fastest time, started the race from first place and was awarded the two points for pole position.) | (South Africa) Keagan Masters | (France) Marvin Klein (Note: Keagan Masters originally won the race, but later received a 5-second time penalty for causing a collision. Francesco Braschi, who was originally classified in second, also received a 5-second time penalty for causing a collision. Marvin Klein, initially classified third, thus inherited the win.) | (Italy) BeDriver | (Italy) Stefano Stefanelli | (Netherlands) Nathan Schaap |
| 3 | R2 | (Italy) Mugello Circuit | (South Africa) Keagan Masters | (France) Marvin Klein | (Italy) Francesco Braschi (Note: Simone Iaquinta originally won the race, but later received a 5-second time penalty for a restart infringement. Francesco Braschi, initially classified second, thus inherited the win.) | (Italy) Ombra Racing | (Italy) Alex de Giacomi | (Italy) Matteo Segre |
| 4 | R1 | (Italy) Autodromo Enzo e Dino Ferrari | (South Africa) Keagan Masters | (South Africa) Keagan Masters | (France) Marvin Klein | (Italy) BeDriver | (Italy) Cesare Brusa | (Italy) Pietro Delli Guanti |
| 4 | R2 | (Italy) Autodromo Enzo e Dino Ferrari | (South Africa) Keagan Masters | (Germany) Alexander Tauscher | (France) Marvin Klein | (Italy) BeDriver | (Italy) Stefano Stefanelli | (Germany) Jan Seyffert |
| 5 | R1 | (Italy) Misano World Circuit Marco Simoncelli | (France) Marvin Klein | (Netherlands) Robert de Haan | (France) Marvin Klein | (Italy) BeDriver | (Italy) Alberto de Amicis | (Italy) Pietro Delli Guanti |
| 5 | R2 | (Italy) Misano World Circuit Marco Simoncelli | (South Africa) Keagan Masters | (France) Marvin Klein | (Germany) Lirim Zendeli (Note: Marvin Klein was the first driver to cross the finish line, but received a 10-second time penalty for causing a collision. Lirim Zendeli, who was the second driver to cross the finish line, thus inherited the win.) | (Italy) BeDriver | (Italy) Stefano Stefanelli | (Italy) Pietro Delli Guanti |
| 6 | R1 | (Italy) Autodromo Nazionale di Monza | (Italy) Francesco Braschi | (South Africa) Keagan Masters | (Italy) Francesco Braschi | (Italy) Ombra Racing | (Italy) Alberto de Amicis | (Germany) Jan Seyffert |
| 6 | R2 | (Italy) Autodromo Nazionale di Monza | (South Africa) Keagan Masters | (South Africa) Keagan Masters | (South Africa) Keagan Masters | (Italy) Team Q8 Hi-Perform | (Italy) Alberto de Amicis | (Italy) Pietro Delli Guanti |

== Championship standings ==
=== Scoring system ===
11 best finishes count for the Overall, Michelin Cup and Rookies' classifications.

The points table for Overall classification is as follows:

| Position | 1st | 2nd | 3rd | 4th | 5th | 6th | 7th | 8th | 9th | 10th | 11th | 12th | 13th | 14th | 15th | Pole | FL |
| Points | 25 | 20 | 17 | 14 | 12 | 10 | 9 | 8 | 7 | 6 | 5 | 4 | 3 | 2 | 1 | 2 | 1 |

The points table for Michelin Cup classification is as follows:

| Position | 1st | 2nd | 3rd | 4th | 5th | 6th | 7th | 8th | 9th | 10th |
| Points | 15 | 12 | 10 | 8 | 6 | 5 | 4 | 3 | 2 | 1 |

=== Drivers' Championship ===
| Pos | Driver | (Italy) MIS1 | | (Italy) VAL | | (Italy) MUG | | (Italy) IMO | | (Italy) MIS2 | | (Italy) MON | | Pts |
|---|---|---|---|---|---|---|---|---|---|---|---|---|---|---|
| 1 | (South Africa) Keagan Masters | 2 | Ret | 1 | 1 | 3 | 10 | 2 | 5 | 15 | 2 | 2 | 1 | 212 |
| 2 | (France) Marvin Klein | 4 | 2 | | | 1 | 5 | 1 | 1 | 1 | 3 | 24 | 4 | 181 |
| 3 | (Germany) Alexander Tauscher | 1 | 1 | | | 5 | 3 | 3 | 2 | 5 | 5 | DNS | DNS | 144 |
| 4 | (Italy) Francesco Braschi | 9 | Ret | 18 | 9 | 6 | 1 | 6 | 3 | Ret | 4 | 1 | 13 | 122 |
| 5 | (Italy) Giorgio Amati | 6 | 3 | 3 | 4 | 7 | 7 | 10 | 12 | 3 | 6 | 10 | Ret | 119 |
| 6 | (Germany) Lirim Zendeli | | | 9 | 7 | 2 | 4 | 8 | 6 | 4 | 1 | 8 | Ret | 115 |
| 7 | (Italy) Aldo Festante | 12 | 16 | 2 | 2 | 9 | 9 | 14 | 8 | 7 | 21 | 19 | 7 | 86 |
| 8 | (Netherlands) Dirk Schouten | 15 | 8 | 6 | 6 | 12 | 12 | 11 | 24 | 9 | 13 | 3 | 3 | 86 |
| 9 | (Italy) Alberto Cerqui | 5 | 4 | 4 | 5 | 29 | 11 | 9 | Ret | Ret | DNS | 6 | 8 | 82 |
| 10 | (Israel) Ariel Levi | | | | | | | 4 | 4 | 10 | 10 | 4 | 2 | 74 |
| 11 | (Italy) Simone Iaquinta | 3 | Ret | Ret | 11 | 4 | 2 | 33 | 29 | Ret | 7 | DNS | DNS | 67 |
| 12 | (Italy) Gianmarco Quaresmini | 8 | 5 | Ret | 13 | 8 | 6 | 25 | Ret | Ret | 12 | 7 | Ret | 54 |
| 13 | (Italy) Filippo Fant | 16 | 9 | 7 | 16 | 11 | 14 | 17 | 15 | 11 | 18 | 5 | 5 | 53 |
| 14 | (Italy) Pietro Delli Guanti | 11 | 11 | 17 | 18 | 15 | 17 | 7 | 26 | 6 | 8 | Ret | 6 | 48 |
| 15 | (Netherlands) Nathan Schaap | 13 | 7 | 10 | 15 | 10 | 15 | 16 | 27 | 17 | 11 | 16 | 11 | 36 |
| 16 | (Germany) Jan Seyffert | 18 | 12 | | | 19 | Ret | 12 | 7 | 8 | 14 | 9 | 15 | 35 |
| 17 | (Belgium) Benjamin Paque | | | 5 | 3 | | | | | | | | | 29 |
| 18 | (Italy) Diego Bertonelli | 10 | 15 | 8 | 8 | 13 | 13 | | | | | | | 29 |
| 19 | (Italy) Matteo Segre | 17 | 18 | 19 | 14 | 31 | 8 | 21 | 25 | 13 | 15 | 11 | 10 | 25 |
| 20 | (Italy) Nicolas Pujatti | 14 | 21 | 12 | 20 | Ret | 26 | Ret | 9 | 18 | 17 | Ret | 9 | 22 |
| 21 | (Netherlands) Robert de Haan | | | | | | | | | 2 | 19 | | | 21 |
| 22 | (Netherlands) Huub van Eijndhoven | 7 | 6 | | | | | | | | | | | 19 |
| 23 | (Brazil) Matheus Ferreira | | | | | | | | | 13 | 9 | 13 | 12 | 16 |
| 24 | (Germany) Janne Stiak | | | | | | | 5 | 13 | | | | | 15 |
| 25 | (Italy) Giuseppe Guirreri | 24 | 31 | 15 | Ret | 17 | 16 | 22 | 10 | 12 | Ret | 15 | 16 | 12 |
| 26 | (Italy) William Mezzetti | 20 | 14 | 14 | Ret | 14 | Ret | 19 | 30 | 22 | 16 | 12 | 14 | 12 |
| 27 | (Australia) Bayley Hall | | | 11 | 10 | | | | | | | | | 11 |
| 28 | (Denmark) Hjelte Hoffner | 21 | 13 | 13 | 12 | 16 | Ret | 15 | DSQ | Ret | 23 | Ret | 18 | 11 |
| 29 | (United Kingdom) James Wallis | 19 | 10 | | | | | | | | | | | 6 |
| 30 | (Argentina) Luciano Martínez | 22 | 17 | 24 | 22 | 20 | 20 | 18 | 11 | 21 | Ret | 17 | Ret | 5 |
| 31 | (Austria) Horst Felix Felbermayr | | | | | | | 13 | 28 | | | 14 | 17 | 5 |
| 32 | (Turkey) Bati Yildirim | 29 | 23 | 25 | 26 | 30 | 22 | 23 | 14 | 16 | 20 | 18 | 20 | 2 |
| 33 | (Italy) Alberto de Amicis | 23 | 19 | 16 | 19 | 21 | Ret | 34 | 20 | 19 | 27 | 21 | 21 | 0 |
| 34 | (San Marino) Lorenzo Cheli | 31 | 24 | 23 | 24 | 27 | 23 | 24 | 16 | 23 | 22 | | | 0 |
| 35 | (Italy) Stefano Stefanelli | 28 | 29 | 21 | 23 | 18 | Ret | 32 | 17 | 20 | 24 | DNS | 22 | 0 |
| 36 | (Italy) Mattia Marchiante | Ret | 22 | 27 | 17 | 23 | 25 | 20 | Ret | | | 25 | 19 | 0 |
| 37 | (Italy) Cesare Brusa | 25 | 20 | | | | | 26 | 18 | | | Ret | DNS | 0 |
| 38 | (Italy) Alex de Giacomi | | | Ret | 25 | 25 | 18 | Ret | DNS | | | | | 0 |
| 39 | (Italy) Francesco Maria Fenici | 27 | 25 | 20 | 21 | 26 | 19 | 28 | 19 | 24 | 26 | Ret | Ret | 0 |
| 40 | (Italy) Eugenio Pisani | | | | | | | | | | | 20 | Ret | 0 |
| 41 | (Italy) Andrea Girondi | 30 | 28 | 22 | Ret | 24 | 21 | 30 | Ret | 25 | 25 | 22 | 23 | 0 |
| 42 | (United Kingdom) Lee Mowle | 32 | 27 | 26 | 27 | Ret | 24 | 29 | 21 | Ret | Ret | Ret | 24 | 0 |
| 43 | (Italy) Gianluca Giorgi | | | | | | | 27 | 22 | | | | | 0 |
| 44 | (Japan) Makoto Haga | | | | | | | 31 | 23 | | | 23 | 25 | 0 |
| 45 | Sergey Titarenko | | | | | 23 | Ret | | | | | | | 0 |
| 46 | (Italy) Paolo Gnemmi | 26 | 26 | | | 28 | Ret | | | | | | | 0 |
| 47 | (Italy) Federico Paolino | Ret | 30 | | | | | | | | | | | 0 |
