= CarTech Motorsport =

German auto racing team

(Germany) CarTech Motorsport
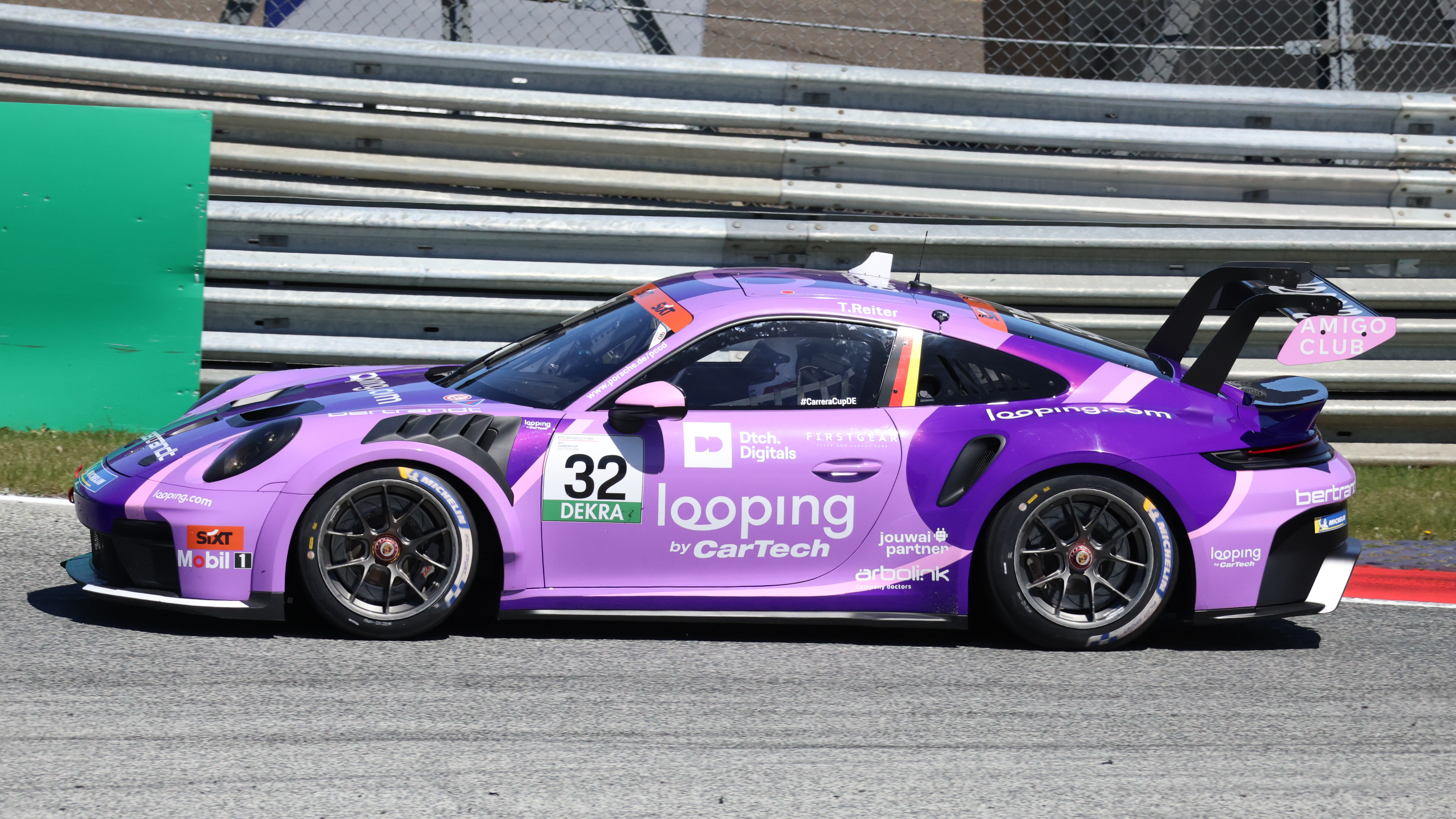
- Founded: 2011
- Base: Ismaning, Bavaria, Germany
- Team principal(s): David Prusa
- Current series: Porsche Supercup; Porsche Carrera Cup Germany
- Former series: GT4 European Series; Porsche Sports Cup Germany
- Current drivers: Porsche Supercup (Japan) 21. Taichi Watarai (Finland) 21. Jukka Honkavuori (Netherlands) 21. Bert de Heus; 21. Alexander Tauscher (Netherlands) 21. Paul de Prenter (Netherlands) 22. Dirk Schouten; Porsche Carrera Cup Germany; 32. Tim Reiter (Netherlands) 34. Dirk Schouten; 92. Georg Griesemann
- Teams' Championships: Porsche Sports Cup Germany: 2018
- Drivers' Championships: Porsche Sports Cup Germany: 2018: Sebastian Daum
- Website: https://www.cartech-muenchen.com/motorsport/

CarTech Motorsport is a German auto racing team competing in the Porsche Supercup and Porsche Carrera Cup Germany.

== History ==
CarTech Motorsport was founded in 2011 by David Prusa.

The team collaborated with fellow German outfit Team GT to run a three car program in the 2018 GT4 European Series. In Porsche Sports Cup Germany, CarTech ran a single car entry for Austrian Sebastian Daum and German Lukas Schreier. They also entered a car for Matthias Jeserich at the Hockenheimring in the 2018 Porsche Carrera Cup Germany. In their first year of racing, they won the 2018 Porsche Sports Cup Germany championship with Daum.

For 2019, CarTech left the GT4 European Series and expanded their presence in Porsche Carrera Cup Germany alongside their Porsche Sports Cup Germany program.

In 2020, Matthias Jeserich secured second place in the 2020 Porsche Carrera Cup Germany Pro-Am championship.

During the 2021 Porsche Carrera Cup Germany, Rudy van Buren finished on the podium twice at Monza and Zandvoort, giving CarTech their first podiums in the series. Following the 2021 Porsche Sports Cup Germany, the team left the series to focus on their efforts in the Porsche Carrera Cup Germany.

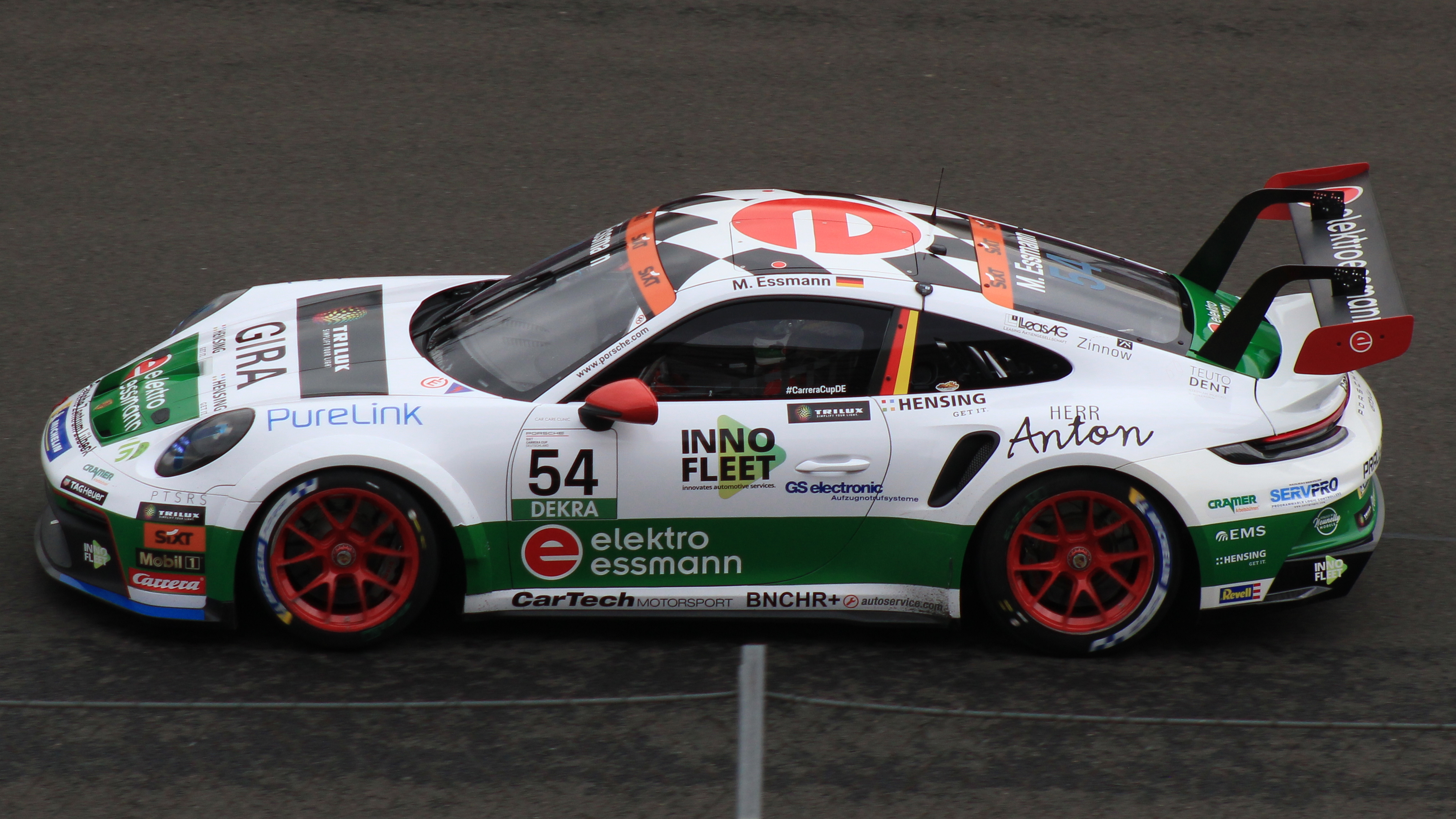
CarTech Motorsport car of Michael Essmann at the Hungaroring in 2024

In 2023, the team assisted Theo Oeverhaus in winning the Porsche Carrera Cup Germany Rookie Championship as well as having Pro-Am drivers Ahmad Alshehab and Michael Essmann finish second and fifth in the Pro-Am standings.

Following an absence from competition in 2025, CarTech partnered with Dutch online car retailer looping.nl to run full-season campaigns for 2026 in the Porsche Carrera Cup Germany and the Porsche Supercup. In Porsche Carrera Cup Germany, the team signed Tim Reiter and Dirk Schouten to both of their full-time entries. Schouten also joined CarTech in their maiden Porsche Supercup campaign. Taichi Watarai and Jukka Honkavuori drove their second supercup entry as guest drivers.

== Current series results ==
=== Porsche Carrera Cup Germany ===
Year	Chassis	Engine	Drivers	Races	Wins	Poles	F. Laps	Podiums	D.C.	Pts	T.C.	Pts
2018	Porsche 991 GT3 Cup	Porsche 4.0 L Flat-6	(Germany) Matthias Jeserich	1	0	0	0	0	26th	0	19th	0
2019	Porsche 991 GT3 Cup	Porsche 4.0 L Flat-6	(Austria) Sebastian Daum	8	0	0	0	0	26th	0	10th	19
2019	Porsche 991 GT3 Cup	Porsche 4.0 L Flat-6	(Germany) Laurin Heinrich	2	0	0	0	0	33rd	0	10th	19
2019	Porsche 991 GT3 Cup	Porsche 4.0 L Flat-6	(Germany) Matthias Jeserich	16	0	0	0	0	34th	0	10th	19
2019	Porsche 991 GT3 Cup	Porsche 4.0 L Flat-6	(Australia) Joey Mawson	4	0	0	0	0	20th	19	10th	19
2019	Porsche 991 GT3 Cup	Porsche 4.0 L Flat-6	(Germany) Christian Voigtländer	2	0	0	0	0	39th	0	10th	19
2020	Porsche 991 GT3 Cup	Porsche 4.0 L Flat-6	(Netherlands) Rudy van Buren	10	0	0	0	0	7th	89	5th	116
2020	Porsche 991 GT3 Cup	Porsche 4.0 L Flat-6	(Germany) Matthias Jeserich	9	0	0	0	0	14th	27	5th	116
2021	Porsche 992 GT3 Cup	Porsche 4.0 L Flat-6	(Netherlands) Rudy van Buren	16	0	0	0	2	6th	137	9th	138
2021	Porsche 992 GT3 Cup	Porsche 4.0 L Flat-6	(Germany) Sebastian Glaser	10	0	0	0	0	33rd	0	9th	138
2021	Porsche 992 GT3 Cup	Porsche 4.0 L Flat-6	(Austria) Felix Neuhofer	2	0	0	0	0	26th	1	9th	138
2022	Porsche 992 GT3 Cup	Porsche 4.0 L Flat-6	(Kuwait) Ahmad Al-Shehab	16	0	0	0	0	38th	0	11th	38
2022	Porsche 992 GT3 Cup	Porsche 4.0 L Flat-6	(Germany) Lukas Ertl	16	0	0	0	0	17th	38	11th	38
2023	Porsche 992 GT3 Cup	Porsche 4.0 L Flat-6	(Kuwait) Ahmad Al-Shehab	16	0	0	0	0	24th	6	5th	139
2023	Porsche 992 GT3 Cup	Porsche 4.0 L Flat-6	(Germany) Michael Essmann	16	0	0	0	0	31st	0	5th	139
2023	Porsche 992 GT3 Cup	Porsche 4.0 L Flat-6	(Germany) Theo Oeverhaus	16	0	0	0	0	7th	113	5th	139
2024	Porsche 992 GT3 Cup	Porsche 4.0 L Flat-6	(Kuwait) Ahmad Al-Shehab	8	0	0	0	0	26th	0	9th	85
2024	Porsche 992 GT3 Cup	Porsche 4.0 L Flat-6	(Germany) Colin Bönighausen	16	0	0	0	0	14th	69	9th	85
2024	Porsche 992 GT3 Cup	Porsche 4.0 L Flat-6	(Germany) Michael Essmann	15	0	0	0	0	23rd	9	9th	85
2024	Porsche 992 GT3 Cup	Porsche 4.0 L Flat-6	(Germany) Kai Pfister	7	0	0	0	0	29th	0	9th	85
2026	Porsche 992.2 GT3 Cup	Porsche 4.0 L Flat-6	(Germany) Georg Griesemann	2	0	0	0	0	NC	0	9th	98
2026	Porsche 992.2 GT3 Cup	Porsche 4.0 L Flat-6	(Germany) Tim Reiter	13	0	0	0	0	33rd	0	9th	98
2026	Porsche 992.2 GT3 Cup	Porsche 4.0 L Flat-6	(Netherlands) Dirk Schouten	16	0	0	1	0	10th	94	9th	98

=== Porsche Supercup ===
Year	Chassis	Engine	Drivers	Races	Wins	Poles	F. Laps	Podiums	D.C.	Pts	T.C.	Pts
2026	Porsche 992.2 GT3 Cup	Porsche 4.0 L Flat-6	(Netherlands) Bert de Heus	1	0	0	0	0	NC	0	5th	68
2026	Porsche 992.2 GT3 Cup	Porsche 4.0 L Flat-6	(Finland) Jukka Honkavuori	3	0	0	0	0	NC	0	5th	68
2026	Porsche 992.2 GT3 Cup	Porsche 4.0 L Flat-6	(Netherlands) Paul de Prenter	2	0	0	0	0	NC	0	5th	68
2026	Porsche 992.2 GT3 Cup	Porsche 4.0 L Flat-6	(Netherlands) Dirk Schouten	8	0	0	0	0	11th	52.5	5th	68
2026	Porsche 992.2 GT3 Cup	Porsche 4.0 L Flat-6	(Germany) Alexander Tauscher	1	0	0	0	0	NC	0	5th	68
2026	Porsche 992.2 GT3 Cup	Porsche 4.0 L Flat-6	(Japan) Taichi Watarai	1	0	0	0	0	NC	0	5th	68

== Timeline ==
Current series
Porsche Supercup	2026–present
Porsche Carrera Cup Germany	2018–2024, 2026–present
Previous series
Porsche Carrera Cup Benelux	2024
Porsche Sports Cup Germany	2018–2021
GT4 European Series	2018
