= Huub van Eijndhoven =

Dutch racing driver (born 1999)

- van Eijndhoven in 2025
- Nationality: (Netherlands) Dutch
- Born: 1 December 1999 (age 26) Eindhoven, Netherlands

Porsche Supercup career
- Debut season: 2022
- Current team: GP Elite
- Categorisation: FIA Silver
- Car number: 26
- Former teams: Universer by Team GP Elite
- Starts: 18 (18 entries)
- Wins: 0
- Podiums: 2
- Poles: 0
- Fastest laps: 0
- Best finish: 6th in 2024

Huub van Eijndhoven (born 1 December 1999) is a Dutch racing driver who competes in the European Le Mans Series in LMGT3 for Proton Competition.

== Career ==
=== Early career ===
Van Eijndhoven started his car racing career in the Supercar Challenge, making his debut in the final two rounds of the 2019 season as he began a partnership with JW Race Service. He continued with the team for his full-time debut the following year, where he won two races and came runner-up to the series.

=== Porsche competition ===
In 2021, van Eijndhoven competed in the Porsche Carrera Cup Benelux and did one guest cameo in the final round of the Porsche Carrera Cup Germany at the Hockenheimring for JW Race Service. At the end of year, he was shortlisted for the Porsche Junior Shootout, but was not chosen as a junior.

Van Eijndhoven driving for GP Elite at Hockenheim in PCCD in 2023.

Van Eijndhoven switched over to GP Elite for the 2022 season and drove full-time in the Porsche Carrera Cup Germany, recording a best finish of sixth at the Sachsenring on his way to 9th. He also contested the only Benelux rounds of the Porsche Supercup at Spa-Francorchamps and Zandvoort. In 2023, van Eijndhoven contested a dual campaign of the Porsche Supercup and the Porsche Carrera Cup Germany, coming 13th in the former and 8th in the latter. He achieved his maiden PCCD podium in the final round at the Hockenheimring.

In 2024, van Eijndhoven continued with the same dual campaign in the Porsche Supercup and the Porsche Carrera Cup Germany. He claimed his maiden Supercup podiums in the only Benelux rounds of the season – Spa-Francorchamps and Zandvoort – and ended the championship sixth in the standings. Van Eijndhoven achieved his first PCCD pole position in the opening round at Imola Circuit. He scored the first podium of his campaign in the second round at the Oschersleben. A round later, he got another pole position on home soil at Zandvoort but it didn't amount to any points at all in the race. He collected two podiums in both races of the Sachsenring, and started the opening race of the final round at the Hockenheimring on pole position, which amounted to his maiden win in Porsche racing. He collected one more podium in the final race of his campaign before ending fourth in the standings.

Van Eijndhoven continued with GP Elite for another dual campaign of the 2025 Porsche Supercup and the Porsche Carrera Cup Germany. He finished the former sixth in the standings, and the latter third in the standings with two poles and four podiums, having a consistent campaign despite recording no wins.

=== GT3 career ===
For the 2026 season, van Eijndhoven switched from Porsche one-make series into endurance racing, and was part of the winning crew in the 6 Hours of Abu Dhabi with Antares Au and Loek Hartog. Van Eijndhoven then contested the European Le Mans Series for Proton Competition in the LMGT3 category. He achieved his first ELMS podium in the third round at the 4 Hours of Imola, partnering Harry King and Martin Berry. A round later at the 2026 4 Hours of Spa-Francorchamps, he collected another podium and a best result of second place alongside Berry and Alessio Picariello. Van Eijndhoven also made his debut in the GT World Challenge Europe Endurance Cup for Herberth Motorsport, sharing a Porsche 911 GT3 R (992.2) in Bronze Cup with Ralf Bohn and team owner Robert Renauer.

== Personal life ==
Van Eijndhoven's father, Bart, and older brother, Lucas, are also racing drivers. Bart owns Basiq Dental, a company that sells dental supplies.

== Racing record ==
=== Racing career summary ===
Season	Series	Team	Races	Wins	Poles	F/Laps	Podiums	Points	Position
2019	Supercar Challenge – GT	JW Race Service	4	0	0	0	3	70	7th
2020	Supercar Challenge – GT	JW Race Service	6	2	1	2	4	110	**2nd**
2021	Porsche Carrera Cup Benelux	JW Race Service							
2021	Porsche Carrera Cup Germany	JW Race Service	2	0	0	0	0	0	NC†
2022	Porsche Supercup	GP Elite	2	0	0	0	0	0	NC†
2022	Porsche Carrera Cup Germany	GP Elite	16	0	0	0	0	82	9th
2022–23	Middle East Trophy – 992	Fach Auto Tech							
2023	Porsche Supercup	GP Elite	8	0	0	0	0	39	13th
2023	Porsche Carrera Cup Germany	GP Elite	16	0	0	0	1	105	8th
2023	24H GT Series – 992	Red Ant Racing							
2023–24	Porsche Carrera Cup Middle East	Team GP Elite	2	0	0	0	0	19	18th
2023–24	Middle East Trophy – 992	Fach Auto Tech							
2024	Porsche Supercup	Universer by Team GP Elite	8	0	0	0	2	85	6th
2024	Porsche Carrera Cup Germany	Universer by Team GP Elite	16	1	3	1	5	171	4th
2024	Porsche Sprint Challenge Southern Europe	Team GP Elite	2	0	0	0	0	19	19th
2024	Porsche Carrera Cup Italy	BeDriver	2	0	0	0	0	12	22nd
2025	Porsche Supercup	GP Elite	8	0	0	0	0	71	6th
2025	Porsche Carrera Cup Germany	Team GP Elite	16	0	2	1	4	186	**3rd**
2025	Porsche Carrera Cup Italy	BeDriver	2	0	0	0	0	19	22nd
2025	Middle East Trophy – 992	Tierra Outdoor Racing by Hans Weijs Motorsport							
2025	24H Series – 992	Ajith Kumar Racing by Red Ant							
2025–26	24H Series Middle East – GT3	Herberth Motorsport							
2025–26	Asian Le Mans Series – GT	Proton Competition	4	0	0	0	0	7	22nd
2026	European Le Mans Series – LMGT3	Proton Competition	6	0	0	0	3	72	4th
2026	Nürburgring Langstrecken-Serie – BMW M2 Racing	JW Raceservice							
2026	GT World Challenge Europe Endurance Cup	Herberth Motorsport	4	0	0	0	0	0	NC*
2026	GT World Challenge Europe Endurance Cup – Bronze	Herberth Motorsport	4	0	1	0	0	23*	17th*

* Season still in progress.

† As Van Eijndhoven was a guest driver, he was ineligible for points.

=== Complete Porsche Carrera Cup Germany results ===
(key) (Races in bold indicate pole position) (Races in italics indicate fastest lap)

Year	Team	1	2	3	4	5	6	7	8	9	10	11	12	13	14	15	16	DC	Points
2021	JW Raceservice	SPA; 1	SPA; 2	OSC; 1	OSC; 2	RBR; 1	RBR; 2	MNZ1; 1	MNZ1; 2	ZAN; 1	ZAN; 2	MNZ2; 1	MNZ2; 2	SAC; 1	SAC; 2	HOC; 1; 10	HOC; 2; 9	NC†	0
2022	GP Elite	SPA; 1; 14	SPA; 2; 14	RBR; 1 Ret	RBR; 2; 10	IMO; 1; 11	IMO; 2; 11	ZAN; 1 Ret	ZAN; 2; 13	NÜR; 1; 9	NÜR; 2; 8	LAU; 1; 8	LAU; 2; 9	SAC; 1; 6	SAC; 2; 10	HOC; 1; 8	HOC; 2; 11	9th	82
2023	Team GP Elite	SPA; 1; 15	SPA; 2; 11	HOC1; 1; 6	HOC1; 2; 9	ZAN; 1; 18	ZAN; 2; 6	NÜR; 1; 9	NÜR; 2; 12	LAU; 1; 7	LAU; 2; 7	SAC; 1 Ret	SAC; 2; 6	RBR; 1; 10	RBR; 2 Ret	HOC2; 1; 2	HOC2; 2; 9	8th	105
2024	UNISERVER by Team GP Elite	**IMO**; **1**; 5	IMO; 2; 6	OSC; 1; 5	OSC; 2; 3	ZAN; 1; 19	**ZAN**; **2**; 20	HUN; 1; 14	HUN; 2; 10	NÜR; 1; 8	NÜR; 2; 7	SAC; 1; 2	SAC; 2; 3	RBR; 1; 6	RBR; 2; 5	**HOC**; **1**; 1	HOC; 2; 3	4th	171
2025	Team GP Elite	IMO; 1; 8	IMO; 2; 4	SPA; 1; 4	SPA; 2; 4	ZAN; 1; 7	ZAN; 2 Ret	NOR; 1; 4	**NOR**; **2**; 2	NÜR; 1; 6	NÜR; 2; 8	SAC; 1; 3	SAC; 2; 3	RBR; 1; 5	**RBR**; **2**; 3	HOC; 1; 4	HOC; 2; 9	3rd	186

† As van Eijndhoven was a guest driver, he was ineligible for points.

=== Complete Porsche Supercup results ===
(key) (Races in bold indicate pole position) (Races in italics indicate fastest lap)

Year	Team	1	2	3	4	5	6	7	8	Pos.	Points
2022	GP Elite	IMO	MON	SIL	RBR	LEC	SPA; 27	ZND; 16	MNZ	NC†	0
2023	GP Elite	MON; 7	RBR; 5	SIL; 21	HUN; 11	SPA; 16	ZND; 6	ZND; 20	MNZ; 23†	13th	39
2024	Universer by Team GP Elite	IMO; 7	MON; 7	RBR; 12	SIL; 29†	HUN; 4	SPA; 2	ZAN; 3	MNZ; 5	6th	85
2025	GP Elite	IMO; 6	MON; 4	CAT; 4	RBR; 9	SPA; 8	HUN; 9	ZAN; 11	MNZ; 5	6th	71

† As van Eijndhoven was a guest driver, he was ineligible for points.

=== Complete Asian Le Mans Series results ===
(key) (Races in bold indicate pole position) (Races in italics indicate fastest lap)

Year	Team	Class	Car	Engine	1	2	3	4	5	6	Pos.	Points
2025–26	Proton Competition	GT	Porsche 911 GT3 R (992)	Porsche 4.2 L Flat-6	SEP; 1	SEP; 2	DUB; 1; 11	DUB; 2; 13	ABU; 1; 13	ABU; 2; 8	22nd	7

=== Complete European Le Mans Series results ===
(key) (Races in bold indicate pole position) (Races in italics indicate fastest lap)

Year	Entrant	Class	Chassis	Engine	1	2	3	4	5	6	Rank	Points
2026	Proton Competition	LMGT3	Porsche 911 GT3 R (992.2)	Porsche 4.2 L Flat-6	CAT; 8	LEC; 5	IMO; 3	SPA; 2	SIL; 3	ALG; 5	4th	72

=== Complete GT World Challenge Europe results ===
==== GT World Challenge Europe Endurance Cup ====
(Races in bold indicate pole position) (Races in italics indicate fastest lap)

Year	Team	Car	Class	1	2	3	4	5	6	7	Pos.	Points
2026	Herberth Motorsport	Porsche 911 GT3 R (992.2)	Bronze	**LEC**; 35	MNZ; 25	SPA; 6H; 39	SPA; 12H; 32	SPA; 24H; 46	NÜR; 35	ALG	17th*	23*
