= Alexander Tauscher =

German racing driver (born 2002)

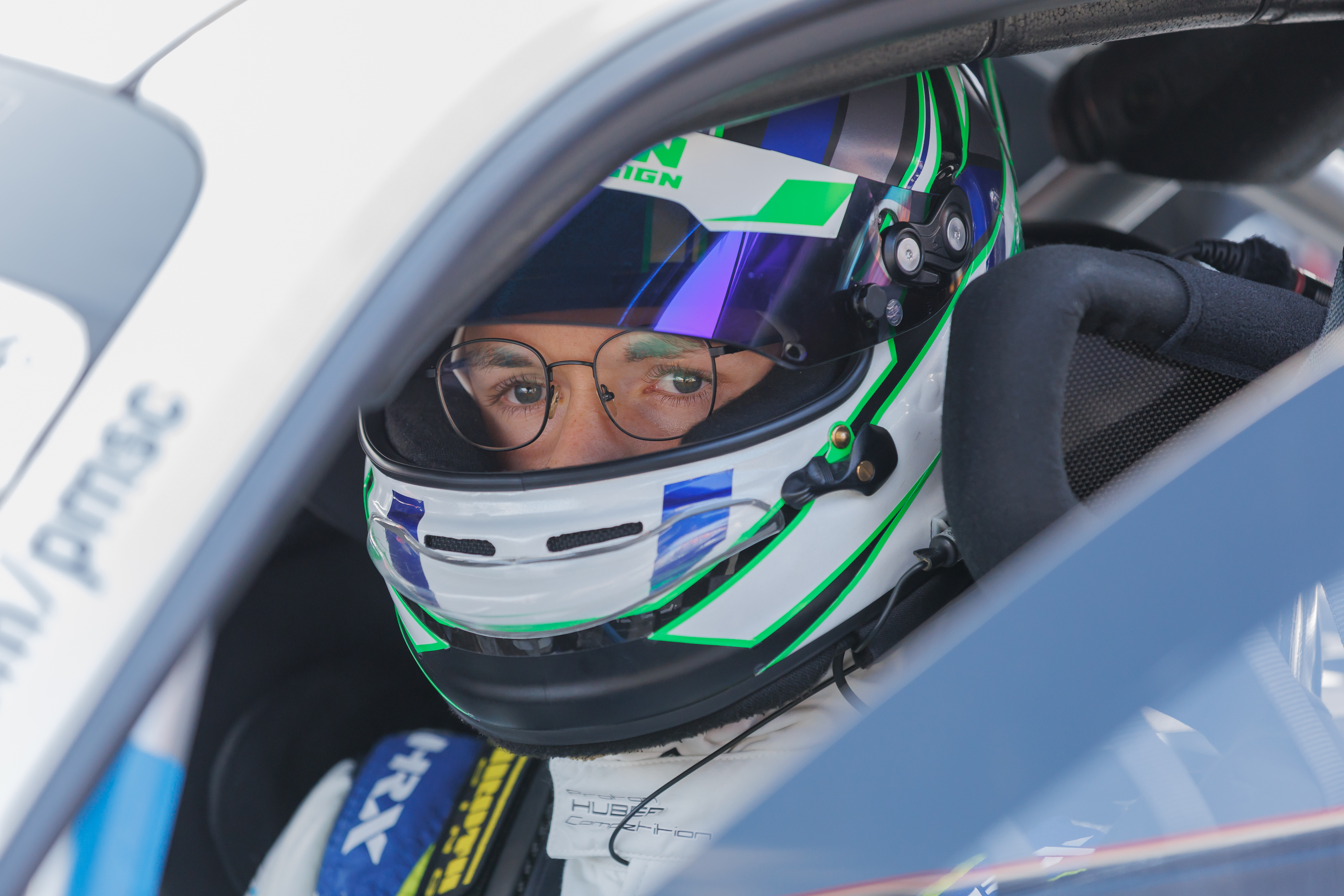
- Tauscher in 2024
- Nationality: (Germany) German
- Born: 15 July 2002 (age 24) Straubing, Germany
- Categorisation: FIA Silver

Alexander Tauscher (born 15 July 2002) is a German racing driver who last competed for Target Competition in Porsche Carrera Cup Germany.

== Career ==
Tauscher began karting at the age of 12, competing until 2019. During his karting career, Tauscher most notably finishing third in the X30 Junior class of the 2014 Kart-Trophy-Weiss-Blau.

After racing for Timo Bernhard's karting team in 2019, Tauscher stepped up to cars the following year driving for Bernhard's team in ADAC GT4 Germany. In his maiden season in car racing, Tauscher took a best result of fifth in race one at Lausitzring en route to a 12th-place points finish. Staying with KÜS Team75 Bernhard for a second season of ADAC GT4 Germany, Tauscher took a best result of fourth in the season-opening race at Oschersleben and ended the year 11th in points.

In 2022, Tauscher joined Allied-Racing for his rookie season in Porsche Carrera Cup Germany. In the eight-round season, Tauscher scored two rookie wins and a best overall result of fifth in race one at Zandvoort, helping him finish the year 11th in points. The following year, Tauscher switched to Huber Racing for his sophomore year in Porsche Carrera Cup Germany. After a slow start to the season, Tauscher began to score top-tens on a regular basis, culminating in his maiden podium in the season finale at Hockenheimring by finishing third, helping him end the year ninth in points.

In 2024, Tauscher joined Proton Huber Competition for a triple campaign in Porsche Sprint Challenge Southern Europe, Porsche Carrera Cup Germany and Porsche Supercup. After taking a lone win at Valencia and finishing runner-up in the Porsche Sprint Challenge Southern Europe standings, Tauscher scored a best result of tenth in Posche Supercup at the Hungaroring to put himself 14th in the standings at season's end. In his third season in Carrera Cup Germany, Tauscher scored his maiden series win from pole at the Nürburgring to end the year ninth in points.

Switching to Target Competition for 2025, Tauscher raced with them for the full Porsche Carrera Cup Germany and Porsche Supercup seasons, along with an additional campaign in Porsche Carrera Cup Italia. In Carrera Cup Germany, Tauscher scored his second series win at the Nürburgring and took two more podiums to finish seventh in points, whereas in Porsche Supercup, Tauscher scored a best result of eighth at Barcelona to end the year 16th in points. In his first season in Carrera Cup Italy, Tauscher won both races at Misano, and remained in title contention until the final round in Monza, in which he withdrew from both races after a crash in qualifying, thus ending the year third in the standings.

The following year, Tauscher remained with Target Competition for his fifth season in Porsche Carrera Cup Germany. In the eight-round season, Tauscher took a lone win at Zandvoort, as well as six other podiums to end the year fourth overall. During 2026, Tauscher made his GT3 debut in ADAC GT Masters for Razoon – more than racing at the Nürburgring, subbing in for an injured Colin Bönighausen, as well as winning in a cameo appearance in Porsche Carrera Cup Asia at Zhuhai.

== Karting record ==
=== Karting career summary ===
Season	Series	Team	Position
2014	Kart-Trophy-Weiss-Blau – X30 Junior	Binder-Racing	3rd
2015	Suddeutscher Kart Cup – X30 Junior		NC
2016	ADAC Kart Bundesendlauf – X30 Junior	Lanari Racing Team	6th
2016	ADAC Kart Masters – X30 Junior		8th
2016	Suddeutscher Kart Cup – X30 Junior		5th
2016	X30 Challenge Europe – Junior		41st
2017	ADAC Kart Masters – OK		7th
2017	Deutsche Kart-Meisterschaft – OK		19th
2018	WSK Champions Cup – OK	Lanari Racing Team	33rd
2018	Deutsche Kart-Meisterschaft – OK	Lanari Racing Team	6th
2018	Karting European Championship – OK	Lanari Racing Team	96th
2018	WSK Final Cup – OK	Lanari Racing Team	24th
2019	South Garda Winter Cup – OK	Steven Lanari	14th
2019	Deutsche Kart-Meisterschaft – OK	Junior TEAM75	5th

== Racing record ==
=== Racing career summary ===
Season	Series	Team	Races	Wins	Poles	F/Laps	Podiums	Points	Position
2020	ADAC GT4 Germany	KÜS Team75 Bernhard	12	0	0	0	0	82	12th
2021	ADAC GT4 Germany	KÜS Team75 Bernhard	12	0	0	0	0	86	11th
2022	Porsche Carrera Cup Germany	Allied-Racing	16	0	0	0	0	70	11th
2022	Porsche Carrera Cup France	Allied-Racing	6	0	0	0	0	55	13th
2023	Porsche Carrera Cup Germany	Huber Racing	16	0	0	0	1	91	9th
2024	Porsche Sprint Challenge Southern Europe – Pro	Proton Huber Competition	6	1	1	0	3	95	**2nd**
2024	Porsche Carrera Cup Germany	Proton Huber Competition	16	1	2	0	1	121	9th
2024	Porsche Supercup	Proton Huber Competition	8	0	0	0	0	24	14th
2025	Porsche Carrera Cup Germany	Target Competition	16	1	1	1	3	154	7th
2025	Porsche Supercup	Target Competition	8	0	0	0	0	22	16th
2025	Porsche Carrera Cup Italy	Target Competition	8	2	1	2	5	144	**3rd**
2026	Porsche Carrera Cup Germany	Target	16	1	4	0	7	202	4th
2026	Porsche Carrera Cup Asia	Absolute Racing	2	1	0	0	1	0	NC†
2026	Porsche Supercup	Proton Competition	2	0	0	0	0	0	NC†
2026	Porsche Supercup	Looping by CarTech	1	0	0	0	0	0	NC†
2026	ADAC GT Masters	razoon – more than racing	2	0	0	0	0	27	19th
2026	Nürburgring Langstrecken-Serie – BMW 325i	EiFelkind Racing							
2026	Porsche Carrera Cup Italy	Prima Ghinzani Motorsport	1	0	0	0	0	0	43rd

^{†} As Tauscher was a guest driver, he was ineligible to score points.

=== Complete ADAC GT4 Germany results ===
(key) (Races in bold indicate pole position) (Races in italics indicate fastest lap)

Year	Team	Car	1	2	3	4	5	6	7	8	9	10	11	12	DC	Points
2020	KÜS Team75 Bernhard	Porsche 718 Cayman GT4 Clubsport	NÜR; 1; 9	NÜR; 2; 9	HOC; 1 Ret	HOC; 2; 6	SAC; 1; 11	SAC; 2; 12	RBR; 1; 7	RBR; 2; 8	LAU; 1; 5	LAU; 2; 6	OSC; 1; 6	OSC; 2; 12	12th	82
2021	KÜS Team75 Bernhard	Porsche 718 Cayman GT4 Clubsport	OSC1; 1; 4	OSC1; 2; 6	RBR; 1; 20	RBR; 2 Ret	ZAN; 1; 6	ZAN; 2; 5	SAC; 1; 7	SAC; 2; 11	HOC; 1; 19	HOC; 2; 20	NÜR; 1; 14	NÜR; 2; 13	11th	86

=== Complete Porsche Carrera Cup Germany results ===
(key) (Races in bold indicate pole position) (Races in italics indicate fastest lap)

Year	Team	1	2	3	4	5	6	7	8	9	10	11	12	13	14	15	16	DC	Points
2022	Allied-Racing	SPA; 1; 15	SPA; 2; 25	RBR; 1; 12	RBR; 2 Ret	IMO; 1; 15	IMO; 2; 26	ZAN; 1; 5	ZAN; 2; 11	NÜR; 1; 12	NÜR; 2; 9	LAU; 1 Ret	LAU; 2; 23	SAC; 1; 7	SAC; 2; 9	HOC; 1; 6	HOC; 2; 10	11th	70
2023	Huber Racing	SPA; 1 DSQ	SPA; 2 DSQ	HOC1; 1; 27	HOC1; 2; 8	ZAN; 1; 16	ZAN; 2; 15	NÜR; 1; 8	NÜR; 2; 4	LAU; 1 Ret	LAU; 2; 6	SAC; 1; 6	SAC; 2; 11	RBR; 1; 7	RBR; 2; 7	HOC2; 1; 14	HOC2; 2; 3	9th	91
2024	Proton Huber Competition	IMO; 1; 8	IMO; 2; 13	OSC; 1; 7	OSC; 2; 9	ZAN; 1; 6	ZAN; 2; 5	HUN; 1; 10	HUN; 2; 8	NÜR; 1 Ret	**NÜR**; **2**; 1	SAC; 1; 19	SAC; 2; 6	**RBR**; **1**; 4	RBR; 2; 16	HOC; 1 Ret	HOC; 2; 5	9th	121
2025	Target	IMO; 1; 3	IMO; 2; 7	SPA; 1; 15	SPA; 2; 9	ZAN; 1; 9	ZAN; 2 Ret	NOR; 1; 9	NOR; 2 Ret	NÜR; 1; 1	NÜR; 2; 4	SAC; 1; 10	SAC; 2; 10	RBR; 1; 4	RBR; 2; 7	**HOC**; **1**; 2	HOC; 2; 4	7th	154
2026	Target	IMO; 1; 2	IMO; 2; 3	**RBR**; **1**; 3	RBR; 2; 4	SPA; 1; 4	SPA; 2; 3	**ZAN**; **1**; 2	**ZAN**; **2**; 1	LAU; 1; 5	LAU; 2 Ret	NOR; 1; 12	NOR; 2; 5	NÜR; 1; 2	**NÜR**; **2**; 15	HOC; 1; 6	HOC; 2; 10	4th	202

=== Complete Porsche Carrera Cup France results ===
(key) (Races in bold indicate pole position) (Races in italics indicate fastest lap)

Year	Team	1	2	3	4	5	6	7	8	9	10	11	12	Pos	Points
2022	Allied-Racing	NOG; 1; 4	NOG; 2; 7	SPA; 1; 8	SPA; 2; 10	MAG; 1; 6	MAG; 2; 8	ZAN; 1	ZAN; 2	VAL; 1	VAL; 2	LEC; 1	LEC; 2	13th	55

=== Complete Porsche Supercup results ===
(key) (Races in bold indicate pole position) (Races in italics indicate fastest lap)

Year	Team	1	2	3	4	5	6	7	8	Pos.	Points
2024	Proton Huber Competition	IMO; Ret	MON; 13	RBR; Ret	SIL; 18	HUN; 10	SPA; 15	ZAN; 11	MNZ; 17	14th	24
2025	Target Competition	IMO; Ret	MON; Ret	CAT; 8	RBR; 12	SPA; 14	HUN; Ret	ZAN; 10	MNZ; 19	16th	22
2026	Proton Competition	MON	CAT; 9	RBR; DSQ						NC†	0†
2026	Looping by CarTech				SPA; 11	HUN	ZND	ZND	MNZ	NC†	0†

=== Complete Porsche Carrera Cup Italia results ===
(key) (Races in bold indicate pole position) (Races in italics indicate fastest lap)

Year	Team	1	2	3	4	5	6	7	8	9	10	11	12	Pos	Points
2025	Target Competition	**MIS1**; **1**; 1	MIS1; 2; 1	VLL; 1	VLL; 2	MUG; 1; 5	MUG; 2; 3	IMO; 1; 3	IMO; 2; 2	MIS2; 1; 5	MIS2; 2; 5	MNZ; 1 DNS	MNZ; 2 DNS	3rd	144
2026	Prima Ghinzani Motorsport	IMO; 1	IMO; 2	MIS1; 1	MIS1; 2	MNZ; 1	MNZ; 2	VAL; 1	VAL; 2	MIS2; 1	MIS2; 2	MUG; 1; 25	MUG; 2 WD	43rd	0

=== Complete ADAC GT Masters results ===
(key) (Races in bold indicate pole position) (Races in italics indicate fastest lap)

Year	Team	Car	1	2	3	4	5	6	7	8	9	10	11	12	DC	Points
2026	razoon – more than racing	Porsche 911 GT3 R (992)	RBR; 1	RBR; 2	ZAN; 1	ZAN; 2	LAU; 1	LAU; 2	NÜR; 1; 7	NÜR; 2; 4^{3}	SAL; 1	SAL; 2	HOC; 1	HOC; 2	19th	27
