= 2021 Porsche Carrera Cup Germany =

Motor racing competition

The 2021 Porsche Carrera Cup Germany was the 36th season of the Porsche Carrera Cup Germany. The season began at Spa-Francorchamps on 30 April 2021 and ended at Hockenheim on 24 October 2021 . Races were held in Belgium, Germany, Austria, Italy and the Netherlands. This was also the first season that the new Porsche 911 GT3 Cup (Type 992) was used by all competitors.

== Calendar ==
The initial calendar was released on 26 November 2020. On 22 July 2021 the ADAC announced to postpone the event on the Nürburgring because of the floods that happened in mid July in the Region around the Ring. That event was then taken of the schedule and replaced by an extra Monza round.

Round	Circuit	Date	Supporting
1	Circuit de Spa-Francorchamps, Stavelot, Belgium	29 April - 1 May	FIA World Endurance Championship
2	Motorsport Arena Oschersleben, Oschersleben, Germany	14–16 May	ADAC GT Masters
3	Red Bull Ring, Spielberg, Austria	11–13 June	ADAC GT Masters
4	Autodromo Nazionale di Monza, Monza, Italy	18–20 June	DTM
5	Circuit Zandvoort, Zandvoort, Netherlands	9–11 July	ADAC GT Masters
6	Autodromo Nazionale di Monza, Monza, Italy	24–26 September	International GT Open
C	Nürburgring, Nürburg, Germany	6-8 August	Cancelled
7	Sachsenring, Hohenstein-Ernstthal, Germany	1–3 October	ADAC GT Masters
8	Hockenheimring, Hockenheim, Germany	22–24 October	ADAC GT Masters

== Entry list ==
Team	No.	Driver	Class	Rounds
(Norway) (Germany) / Nebulus Racing by Huber (Note: Cars No. 8, 19, 39, 40, 44 and 77 entered as Nebulus Racing by Huber and cars No. 3, 89 and 92 entered as VAN BERGHE Huber Racing); (Norway) (Germany) / VAN BERGHE Huber Racing	3	(Germany) Lukas Ertl	P	7
(Norway) (Germany) / Nebulus Racing by Huber; (Norway) (Germany) / VAN BERGHE Huber Racing	8	(Bulgaria) Georgi Donchev	PA	All
(Norway) (Germany) / Nebulus Racing by Huber; (Norway) (Germany) / VAN BERGHE Huber Racing	19	(Portugal) Antonio Teixeira	R	1–5
(Norway) (Germany) / Nebulus Racing by Huber; (Norway) (Germany) / VAN BERGHE Huber Racing	39	(Austria) Philipp Sager	PA	6
(Norway) (Germany) / Nebulus Racing by Huber; (Norway) (Germany) / VAN BERGHE Huber Racing	40	(Germany) Matthias Jeserich	PA	7
(Norway) (Germany) / Nebulus Racing by Huber; (Norway) (Germany) / VAN BERGHE Huber Racing	44	(Germany) Stefan Rehkopf	PA	8
(Norway) (Germany) / Nebulus Racing by Huber; (Norway) (Germany) / VAN BERGHE Huber Racing	77	(Germany) Leon Köhler	P	All
(Norway) (Germany) / Nebulus Racing by Huber; (Norway) (Germany) / VAN BERGHE Huber Racing	89	(United Arab Emirates) Bashar Mardini	PA	1–6, 8
(Norway) (Germany) / Nebulus Racing by Huber; (Norway) (Germany) / VAN BERGHE Huber Racing	92	(Germany) Laurin Heinrich	P	All
(Germany) Black Falcon Team TEXTAR	4	(Netherlands) Loek Hartog	R	All
(Germany) Black Falcon Team TEXTAR	5	(Germany) Sören Spreng	PA	8
(Germany) Black Falcon Team TEXTAR	6	(Luxembourg) Carlos Rivas	PA	All
(Germany) / HRT Motorsport (Note: Cars No. 7, 9 and 69 entered as HRT Motorsport and cars No. 18, 31 and 46 entered as HRT Performance); (Germany) / HRT Performance	7	(Germany) Kim Andre Hauschild	PA	All
(Germany) / HRT Motorsport; (Germany) / HRT Performance	9	(Netherlands) Jaap van Lagen	P	5
(Germany) / HRT Motorsport; (Germany) / HRT Performance	18	(Germany) Julian Hanses	P	All
(Germany) / HRT Motorsport; (Germany) / HRT Performance	31	(Germany) Sebastian Freymuth	R	3–4
(Germany) / HRT Motorsport; (Germany) / HRT Performance	46	(Germany) Fabio Citignola	R	All
(Germany) / HRT Motorsport; (Germany) / HRT Performance	69	(Germany) Holger Harmsen	PA	1, 3–4, 6–8
(Switzerland) Fach Auto Racing	10	(Germany) Sandro Kaibach	P	All
(Switzerland) Fach Auto Racing	27	(Austria) Christopher Zöchling	P	All
(Switzerland) Fach Auto Racing	28	(Germany) Christof Langer	PA	All
(Netherlands) / Team GP Elite (Note: Cars No. 11, 25 and 26 entered as Team GP Elite and cars No. 15, 16, 22 and 24 entered as GP Elite); (Netherlands) / GP Elite	11	(Netherlands) Morris Schuring	R	All
(Netherlands) / Team GP Elite; (Netherlands) / GP Elite	15	(Netherlands) Lucas Groeneveld	P	All
(Netherlands) / Team GP Elite; (Netherlands) / GP Elite	16	(Netherlands) Daan van Kuijk	P	All
(Netherlands) / Team GP Elite; (Netherlands) / GP Elite	22	(Netherlands) Thierry Vermeulen	R	8
(Netherlands) / Team GP Elite; (Netherlands) / GP Elite	24	(Netherlands) Max van Splunteren	P	1–4
(Netherlands) / Team GP Elite; (Netherlands) / GP Elite	25	(Netherlands) Larry ten Voorde	P	All
(Netherlands) / Team GP Elite; (Netherlands) / GP Elite	26	(Netherlands) Jesse van Kuijk	P	1–7
(Netherlands) JW Raceservice	12	(Netherlands) Huub van Eijndhoven	R	8
(Germany) MRS GT-Racing	14	(Kuwait) Ahmad Alshehab	PA	All
(Germany) MRS GT-Racing	41	(Finland) Jukka Honkavuori	P	All
(France) Martinet by Alméras	17	(France) Dorian Boccolacci	R	1, 3
(France) Martinet by Alméras	21	(France) Clement Mateu	PA	3
(France) Martinet by Alméras	23	(United Kingdom) Aaron Mason	PA	3
(Germany) CarTech Motorsport by Nigrin	33	(Austria) Felix Neuhofer	P	4
(Germany) CarTech Motorsport by Nigrin	55	(Germany) Sebastian Glaser	PA	1–3, 7–8
(Germany) CarTech Motorsport by Nigrin	57	(Netherlands) Rudy van Buren	P	All
(Germany) Allied Racing	35	(Switzerland) Rudolf Rhyn	R	All
(Germany) Allied Racing	99	(Denmark) Bastian Buus	R	All
(Italy) Dinamic Motorsport	38	(Italy) Simone Iaquinta	P	5
(Italy) Dinamic Motorsport	39	(Austria) Philipp Sager	PA	5
(Germany) Phoenix-IronForce Racing	53	(Turkey) Ayhancan Güven	P	All
(Germany) Phoenix-IronForce Racing	96	(Germany) Jan Eric Slooten	PA	All

Icon	Class
P	Pro Cup
R	Rookie
PA	Pro-Am Cup
	Guest Starter

== Results ==
All results can be found here.

Round		Circuit	Pole	Overall winner	Rookie Winner	ProAm Winner
1	R1	(Belgium) Circuit de Spa-Francorchamps	(Netherlands) Larry ten Voorde	(Netherlands) Larry ten Voorde	(France) Dorian Boccolacci	(Luxembourg) Carlos Rivas
1	R2	(Belgium) Circuit de Spa-Francorchamps	(Netherlands) Larry ten Voorde	(Netherlands) Larry ten Voorde	(Denmark) Bastian Buus	(Luxembourg) Carlos Rivas
2	R1	(Germany) Motorsport Arena Oschersleben	(Turkey) Ayhancan Güven	(Turkey) Ayhancan Güven	(Netherlands) Morris Schuring	(Luxembourg) Carlos Rivas
2	R2	(Germany) Motorsport Arena Oschersleben	(Germany) Laurin Heinrich	(Germany) Laurin Heinrich	(Netherlands) Morris Schuring	(Luxembourg) Carlos Rivas
3	R1	(Austria) Red Bull Ring	(Turkey) Ayhancan Güven	(Germany) Leon Köhler	(Denmark) Bastian Buus	(Luxembourg) Carlos Rivas
3	R2	(Austria) Red Bull Ring	(Turkey) Ayhancan Güven	(Germany) Laurin Heinrich	(Denmark) Bastian Buus	(Luxembourg) Carlos Rivas
4	R1	(Italy) Autodromo Nazionale di Monza	(Netherlands) Larry ten Voorde	(Netherlands) Larry ten Voorde	(Netherlands) Loek Hartog	(Luxembourg) Carlos Rivas
4	R2	(Italy) Autodromo Nazionale di Monza	(Netherlands) Larry ten Voorde	(Netherlands) Larry ten Voorde	(Netherlands) Loek Hartog	(Bulgaria) Georgi Donchev
5	R1	(Netherlands) Circuit Zandvoort	(Netherlands) Larry ten Voorde	(Netherlands) Larry ten Voorde	(Netherlands) Morris Schuring	(Germany) Kim Andre Hauschild
5	R2	(Netherlands) Circuit Zandvoort	(Turkey) Ayhancan Güven	(Turkey) Ayhancan Güven	(Netherlands) Loek Hartog	(Germany) Kim Andre Hauschild
6	R1	(Italy) Autodromo Nazionale di Monza	(Turkey) Ayhancan Güven	(Turkey) Ayhancan Güven	(Netherlands) Loek Hartog	(Luxembourg) Carlos Rivas
6	R2	(Italy) Autodromo Nazionale di Monza	(Netherlands) Larry ten Voorde	(Netherlands) Larry ten Voorde	(Denmark) Bastian Buus	(Luxembourg) Carlos Rivas
7	R1	(Germany) Sachsenring	(Turkey) Ayhancan Güven	(Netherlands) Larry ten Voorde	(Netherlands) Morris Schuring	(Germany) Kim Andre Hauschild
7	R2	(Germany) Sachsenring	(Turkey) Ayhancan Güven	(Turkey) Ayhancan Güven	(Denmark) Bastian Buus	(Germany) Kim Andre Hauschild
8	R1	(Germany) Hockenheimring	(Netherlands) Larry ten Voorde	(Netherlands) Larry ten Voorde	(Netherlands) Morris Schuring	(Luxembourg) Carlos Rivas
8	R2	(Germany) Hockenheimring	(Netherlands) Larry ten Voorde	(Germany) Leon Köhler	(Denmark) Bastian Buus	(Luxembourg) Carlos Rivas

== Standings ==
All standings can be found here.

=== Scoring system ===
Points were awarded to the first 15 classified drivers in the following number. Guest drivers' points were eliminated at the end of the season, so identical positions may have different point values:

Position	1st	2nd	3rd	4th	5th	6th	7th	8th	9th	10th	11th	12th	13th	14th	15th
Points	25	20	16	13	11	10	9	8	7	6	5	4	3	2	1

=== Overall ===
Pos.	Driver	Team	SPA (Belgium)		OSC (Germany)		RBR (Austria)		MNZ (Italy)		ZND (Netherlands)		MNZ (Italy)		SAC (Germany)		HOC (Germany)		Points
Pos.	Driver	Team	R1	R2	R1	R2	R1	R2	R1	R2	R1	R2	R1	R2	R1	R2	R1	R2	Points
1	(Netherlands) Larry ten Voorde	(Netherlands) Team GP Elite	1	1	2	3	2	6	1	1	1	5	4	1	1	3	1	2	326
2	(Turkey) Ayhancan Güven	(Germany) Phoenix-IronForce Racing	Ret	4	1	2	3	2	3	3	3	1	1	2	2	1	7	7	275
3	(Germany) Leon Köhler	(Norway) Nebulus Racing by Huber	4	5	4	4	1	3	4	5	4	3	3	4	5		4	1	222
4	(Germany) Laurin Heinrich	(Germany) VAN BERGHE Huber Racing	2	2	3	1	4	1	2	4	15	6	2	6	Ret	Ret	2	Ret	214
5	(Austria) Christopher Zöchling	(Switzerland) FACH AUTO TECH	3	3	6	5	7	29	10	7	10	10	5	15	4	2	6	6	156
6	(Netherlands) Rudy van Buren	(Germany) CarTech Motorsport by Nigrin	8	14	8	9	11	8	7	2	2	17	8	16	9	4	5	8	137
7	(Denmark) Bastian Buus	(Germany) Allied Racing	DSQ	8	9	11	5	5	9	19	11	8	7	3	8	8	28	3	120
8	(Netherlands) Morris Schuring	(Netherlands) Team GP Elite	Ret	10	5	7	Ret	17	8	16	6	7	Ret	5	6	10	3	4	109
9	(Germany) Julian Hanses	(Germany) HRT Performance	11	13	7	8	8	4	14	9	7	12	9	19	3	11	13	11	108
10	(Netherlands) Loek Hartog	(Germany) Black Falcon Team TEXTAR	7	9	18	25	15	10	5	10	8	2	6	13	11	12	9	10	107
11	(Netherlands) Max van Splunteren	(Netherlands) GP Elite	6	7	10	6	6	9	6	6	5	10							91
12	(Finland) Jukka Honkavuori	(Germany) MRS GT-Racing	13	12	11	10	12	11	Ret	8	Ret	21	Ret	20	7	5	8	5	77
13	(Netherlands) Jesse van Kujk	(Netherlands) Team GP Elite	10	11	19	12	10	12	Ret	14	17	14	11	9	DNS				45
14	(Netherlands) Daan van Kuijk	(Netherlands) GP Elite	Ret	Ret	13	Ret	16	16	11	27	14	13	12	14	10	9	11	14	45
15	(Germany) Fabio Citignola	(Germany) HRT Performance	12	19	16	18	13	14	Ret	13	13	15	14	7	15	13	14	12	44
16	(Germany) Sandro Kaibach	(Switzerland) FACH AUTO TECH	24	6	15	15	14	13	16	Ret	19	20	13	21	12	6	15	13	43
17	(Netherlands) Lucas Goreneveld	(Netherlands) GP Elite	9	16	12	16	Ret	Ret	22	Ret	16	16	10	8	13	15	16	Ret	34
18	(Switzerland) Rudolf Rhyn	(Germany) Allied Racing	25	20	14	14	18	20	12	12	21	19	16	11	19	14	17	15	21
19	(Luxembourg) Carlos Rivas	(Germany) Black Falcon Team TEXTAR	14	18	17	13	19	15	13	25	20	22	15	10	18	22	18	16	19
20	(Netherlands) Jaap van Lagen	(Germany) HRT Motorsport									12	4							18
21	(Germany) Lukas Ertl	(Germany) VAN BERGHE Huber Racing													17	7			9
22	(Portugal) Antonio Teixeira	(Norway) Nebulus Racing by Huber	15	17	19	21	24	22	Ret	11	22	23							7
23	(Germany) Kim Andre Hauschild	(Germany) HRT Motorsport	17	22	22	20	20	19	18	26	18	18	17	12	14	17	19	18	6
24	(Netherlands) Thierry Vermeulen	(Netherlands) GP Elite															12	Ret	5
25	(United Arab Emirates) Bashar Mardini	(Germany) VAN BERGHE Huber Racing	16	23	23	19	25	28	Ret	21	26	24	20	23			20	20	1
26	(Austria) Felix Neuhofer	(Germany) CarTech Motorsport by Nigrin							23	15									1
	(Bulgaria) Georgi Donchev	(Norway) Nebulus Racing by Huber	18	21	27	Ret	22	21	17	17	25	27	19	17	Ret	18	22	17	0
	(Germany) Jan Erik Slooten	(Germany) Phoenix-Ironforce Racing	19	24	21	17	Ret	24	20	18	23	26	21	18	16	19	21	19	0
	(Germany) Holger Harmsen	(Germany) HRT Motorsport	23	27			28	27	24	24	23		23	24	24	25	29	26	0
	(Kuwait) Ahmad Alshehab	(Germany) MRS GT-Racing	22	28	26	23	26	26	19	23	27	28	24	Ret	22	21	27	22	0
	(Germany) Christof Langer	(Switzerland) FACH AUTO TECH	21	26	25	24	27	25	21	20	28	29	22	22	23	23	24	25	0
	(Austria) Philipp Sager	(Norway) Nebulus Racing by Huber											18	Ret					0
	(Germany) Sebastian Glaser	(Germany) CarTech Motorsport by Nigrin	20	25	24	22	Ret	Ret							21	20	26	24	0
	(Germany) Matthias Jeserich	(Norway) Nebulus Racing by Huber													20	24			0
	(Germany) Stefan Rehkopf	(Norway) Nebulus Racing by Huber															23	23	0
Guest Entries ineligible to score Points
	(France) Dorian Boccolacci	(France) Martinet by Alméras	5	15			9	7											
	(Netherlands) Huub van Eijndhoven	(Netherlands) JW Raceservice															10	9	
	(Italy) Simone Iaquinta	(Italy) Dinamic Motorsport									9	11							
	(Germany) Sebastian Freymuth	(Germany) HRT Performance					17	18	15	22									
	(France) Clement Mateu	(France) Martinet by Alméras					21	23											
	(United Kingdom) Aaron Mason	(France) Martinet by Alméras					23	Ret											
	(Germany) Sören Spreng	(Germany) Black Falcon Team TEXTAR															25	21	
	(Austria) Philipp Sager	(Italy) Dinamic Motorsport									24	25							
Pos.	Driver	Team	R1	R2	R1	R2	R1	R2	R1	R2	R1	R2	R1	R2	R1	R2	R1	R2	Points
Pos.	Driver	Team	SPA (Belgium)		OSC (Germany)		RBR (Austria)		MNZ (Italy)		ZND (Netherlands)		MNZ (Italy)		SAC (Germany)		HOC (Germany)		Points

=== Rookie ===
Pos.	Driver	Team	SPA (Belgium)		OSC (Germany)		RBR (Austria)		MNZ (Italy)		ZND (Netherlands)		MNZ (Italy)		SAC (Germany)		HOC (Germany)		Points
Pos.	Driver	Team	R1	R2	R1	R2	R1	R2	R1	R2	R1	R2	R1	R2	R1	R2	R1	R2	Points
1	(Netherlands) Loek Hartog	(Germany) Black Falcon Team TEXTAR	7	9	18	25	15	10	5	10	8	2							197
2	(Denmark) Bastian Buus	(Germany) Allied Racing	DSQ	8	9	11	5	5	9	19	11	8							173
3	(Netherlands) Morris Schuring	(Netherlands) Team GP Elite	Ret	10	5	7	Ret	17	8	16	6	7							155
4	(Germany) Fabio Citignola	(Germany) HRT Performance	12	19	16	18	13	14	Ret	13	13	15							132
5	(Switzerland) Rudolf Rhyn	(Germany) Allied Racing	25	20	14	14	18	20	12	12	21	19							130
6	(Portugal) Antonio Teixeira	(Norway) Nebulus Racing by Huber	15	17	19	21	24	22	Ret	11	22	23							111
Guest Entries ineligible to score Points
	(France) Dorian Boccolacci	(France) Martinet by Alméras	5	15			9	7											
	(Germany) Sebastian Freymuth	(Germany) HRT Performance					17	18	15	22									
Pos.	Driver	Team	R1	R2	R1	R2	R1	R2	R1	R2	R1	R2	R1	R2	R1	R2	R1	R2	Points
Pos.	Driver	Team	SPA (Belgium)		OSC (Germany)		RBR (Austria)		MNZ (Italy)		ZND (Netherlands)		MNZ (Italy)		SAC (Germany)		HOC (Germany)		Points

=== ProAm ===
Pos.	Driver	Team	SPA (Belgium)		OSC (Germany)		RBR (Austria)		MNZ (Italy)		ZND (Netherlands)		MNZ (Italy)		SAC (Germany)		HOC (Germany)		Points
Pos.	Driver	Team	R1	R2	R1	R2	R1	R2	R1	R2	R1	R2	R1	R2	R1	R2	R1	R2	Points
1	(Luxembourg) Carlos Rivas	(Germany) Black Falcon Team TEXTAR	14	18	17	13	19	15	13	25	20	22							224
2	(Germany) Kim Andre Hauschild	(Germany) HRT Motorsport	17	22	22	20	20	19	18	26	18	18							175
3	(Bulgaria) Georgi Donchev	(Norway) Nebulus Racing by Huber	18	21	27	Ret	22	21	17	17	25	27							142
4	(Germany) Jan Erik Slooten	(Germany) Phoenix-Ironforce Racing	19	24	21	17	Ret	24	20	18	23	26							135
5	(United Arab Emirates) Bashar Mardini	(Germany) VAN BERGHE Huber Racing	16	23	23	19	25	28	Ret	21	26	24							123
6	(Germany) Christof Langer	(Switzerland) FACH AUTO TECH	21	26	25	24	27	25	21	20	28	29							102
7	(Kuwait) Ahmad Alshehab	(Germany) MRS GT-Racing	22	28	26	23	26	26	19	23	27	28							99
8	(Germany) Holger Harmsen	(Germany) HRT Motorsport	23	27			28	27	24	24									52
9	(Germany) Sebastian Glaser	(Germany) CarTech Motorsport by Nigrin	20	25	24	22	Ret	Ret											42
Guest Entries ineligible to score Points
	(France) Clement Mateu	(France) Martinet by Alméras					21	23											
	(United Kingdom) Aaron Mason	(France) Martinet by Alméras					23	Ret											
	(Austria) Philip Sager	(Italy) Dinamic Motorsport									24	25							
Pos.	Driver	Team	R1	R2	R1	R2	R1	R2	R1	R2	R1	R2	R1	R2	R1	R2	R1	R2	Points
Pos.	Driver	Team	SPA (Belgium)		OSC (Germany)		RBR (Austria)		MNZ (Italy)		ZND (Netherlands)		MNZ (Italy)		SAC (Germany)		HOC (Germany)		Points

=== Team ===
Pos.	Team	SPA (Belgium)		OSC (Germany)		RBR (Austria)		MNZ (Italy)		ZND (Netherlands)		MNZ (Italy)		SAC (Germany)		HOC (Germany)		Points
Pos.	Team	R1	R2	R1	R2	R1	R2	R1	R2	R1	R2	R1	R2	R1	R2	R1	R2	Points
1	(Netherlands) Team GP Elite	1	1	2	3	2	6	1	1	1	5							276
1	(Netherlands) Team GP Elite	DNF	10	5	7	DNF	17	8	16	6	7							276
1	(Netherlands) Team GP Elite	10	11	19	12	10	12	DNF	14	17	14							276
2	(Germany) Phoenix-Ironforce Racing	DNF	4	1	2	3	2	3	3	3	1							167
2	(Germany) Phoenix-Ironforce Racing	19	24	21	17	DNF	24	20	18	23	26							167
3	(Germany) VAN BERGHE Huber Racing	2	2	3	1	4	1	2	4	15	6							165
3	(Germany) VAN BERGHE Huber Racing	16	23	23	19	25	28	DNF	21	26	24							165
4	(Norway) Nebulus Racing by Huber	4	5	4	4	1	3	4	5	4	3							152
4	(Norway) Nebulus Racing by Huber	15	17	19	21	24	22	DNF	11	22	23							152
4	(Norway) Nebulus Racing by Huber	18	21	27	DNF	22	21	17	17	25	27							152
5	(Netherlands) GP Elite	6	7	10	6	6	9	6	6	5	10							120
5	(Netherlands) GP Elite	DNF	DNF	13	DNF	16	16	11	27	14	13							120
5	(Netherlands) GP Elite	9	16	12	16	DNF	DNF	22	DNF	16	16							120
6	(Switzerland) FACH AUTO TECH	3	3	6	5	7	29	10	7									113
6	(Switzerland) FACH AUTO TECH	24	6	15	15	14	13	16	DNF	19	20							113
6	(Switzerland) FACH AUTO TECH	21	26	25	24	27	25	21	20	28	29							113
7	(Germany) HRT Performance	11	13	7	8	8	4	14	9	7	12							94
7	(Germany) HRT Performance	12	19	16	18	13	14	DNF	13	13	15							94
7	(Germany) HRT Performance							17	18	15	22							94
8	(Germany) CarTech Motorsport by Nigrin	8	14	8	9	11	8	7	2	2	17							94
8	(Germany) CarTech Motorsport by Nigrin							23	15									94
8	(Germany) CarTech Motorsport by Nigrin	20	25	24	22	DNF	DNF											94
9	(Germany) Black Falcon Team TEXTAR	7	9	18	25	15	10	5	10	8	2							83
9	(Germany) Black Falcon Team TEXTAR	14	18	17	13	19	15	13	25	20	22							83
10	(Germany) Allied Racing	DSQ	8	9	11	5	5	9	19	11	8							77
10	(Germany) Allied Racing	25	20	14	14	18	20	12	12	21	19							77
11	(Germany) MRS GT-Racing	13	12	11	10	12	11	DNF	8	DNF	21							39
11	(Germany) MRS GT-Racing	22	28	26	23	26	26	19	23	27	28							39
12	(Germany) HRT Motorsport									12	4							20
12	(Germany) HRT Motorsport	17	22	22	20	20	19	18	26	18	18							20
12	(Germany) HRT Motorsport	23	27			28	27	24	24									20
Guest Entries ineligible to score Points
	(France) Martinet by Alméras	5	15			9	7											
	(France) Martinet by Alméras					21	23											
	(France) Martinet by Alméras					23	DNF											
	(Italy) Dinamic Motorsport									9	11							
	(Italy) Dinamic Motorsport									24	25							
Pos.	Team	R1	R2	R1	R2	R1	R2	R1	R2	R1	R2	R1	R2	R1	R2	R1	R2	Points
Pos.	Team	SPA (Belgium)		OSC (Germany)		RBR (Austria)		MNZ (Italy)		ZND (Netherlands)		MNZ (Italy)		SAC (Germany)		HOC (Germany)		Points

== See also ==
- 2021 Porsche Supercup
