= 2022 Porsche Carrera Cup Germany =

Motor racing competition

The 2022 Porsche Carrera Cup Germany was the 37th season of the Porsche Carrera Cup Germany. The season began at Spa-Francorchamps on 5 May and ended at Hockenheim on 23 October. Races were held in Belgium, Germany, Austria, Italy and the Netherlands.

== Calendar ==
Round	Circuit	Date	Supporting
1	Circuit de Spa-Francorchamps, Stavelot, Belgium	5–7 May	FIA World Endurance Championship
2	Red Bull Ring, Spielberg, Austria	20–22 May	ADAC GT Masters
3	Imola Circuit, Imola, Italy	17–19 June	Deutsche Tourenwagen Masters
4	Circuit Zandvoort, Zandvoort, Netherlands	24–26 June	ADAC GT Masters
5	(Germany) Nürburgring, Nürburg, Germany	5–7 August	ADAC GT Masters
6	Lausitzring, Klettwitz, Germany	19–21 August	ADAC GT Masters
7	Sachsenring, Hohenstein-Ernstthal, Germany	23–25 September	ADAC GT Masters
8	Hockenheimring, Hockenheim, Germany	21–23 October	ADAC GT Masters

== Entry list ==
Team	No.	Driver	Class	Rounds
(Germany) Huber Racing (Note: Cars No. 2, 57 and 75 entered as Huber Racing and cars No. 3, 14, 44 and 92 entered as SSR Huber Racing) (Germany) SSR Huber Racing (Note: Cars No. 2, 57 and 75 entered as Huber Racing and cars No. 3, 14, 44 and 92 entered as SSR Huber Racing)	2	(Bulgaria) Georgi Donchev	PA	All
(Germany) Huber Racing (Germany) SSR Huber Racing	3	(Germany) Laurin Heinrich	P	All
(Germany) Huber Racing (Germany) SSR Huber Racing	14	(Netherlands) Morris Schuring	P	All
(Germany) Huber Racing (Germany) SSR Huber Racing	44	(Germany) Jonas Greif	R	5–8
(Germany) Huber Racing (Germany) SSR Huber Racing	57	(Netherlands) Rudy van Buren	P	All
(Germany) Huber Racing (Germany) SSR Huber Racing	75	(Israel) Ariel Levi	R	All
(Germany) Huber Racing (Germany) SSR Huber Racing	92	(Germany) Michael Ammermüller	P	1–4
(Germany) Black Falcon	4	(Netherlands) Loek Hartog	P	All
(Germany) Black Falcon	5	(Germany) Sören Spreng	PA	All
(Germany) Black Falcon	6	(Luxembourg) Carlos Rivas	PA	All
(Switzerland) Fach Auto Tech	7	(Germany) Christof Langer	PA	All
(Switzerland) Fach Auto Tech	8	(Switzerland) Alexander Fach	R	All
(Switzerland) Fach Auto Tech	9	(United Kingdom) Lorcan Hanafin	R	All
(Germany) HRT Performance (Note: Cars No. 10, 15, 31, 65, 69 and 77 entered as HRT Performance and car No. 68 entered as HRT Motorsport in round 5 and as HRT Performance in round 6.) (Germany) HRT Motorsport (Note: Cars No. 10, 15, 31, 65, 69 and 77 entered as HRT Performance and car No. 68 entered as HRT Motorsport in round 5 and as HRT Performance in round 6.)	10	(Germany) Matthias Jeserich	PA	1
(Germany) HRT Performance (Germany) HRT Motorsport	15	(Austria) Philipp Sager	PA	2
(Germany) HRT Performance (Germany) HRT Motorsport	31	(Germany) Sebastian Freymuth	R	All
(Germany) HRT Performance (Germany) HRT Motorsport	65	(Germany) Kai Pfister	PA	2, 5, 8
(Germany) HRT Performance (Germany) HRT Motorsport	68	(Germany) Tim Stender	R	5–6
(Germany) HRT Performance (Germany) HRT Motorsport	69	(Germany) Holger Harmsen	PA	1, 7–8
(Germany) HRT Performance (Germany) HRT Motorsport	77	(Germany) Kim Andre Hauschild	PA	3–4, 6–7
(Germany) Allied-Racing	13	(Germany) Alexander Tauscher	R	All
(Germany) Allied-Racing	99	(Denmark) Bastian Buus	P	All
(Austria) HP Racing International	20	(Austria) Harald Prozcyk	P	All
(Austria) HP Racing International	98	(Germany) Jan Seyffert	R	All
(Netherlands) Team GP Elite (Note: Cars No. 22, 24, 25 and 26 entered as Team GP Elite and cars No. 27, 28 and 29 entered as GP Elite.) (Netherlands) GP Elite (Note: Cars No. 22, 24, 25 and 26 entered as Team GP Elite and cars No. 27, 28 and 29 entered as GP Elite.)	22	(Belgium) Ghislain Cordeel	R	8
(Netherlands) Team GP Elite (Netherlands) GP Elite	24	(Netherlands) Max van Splunteren	P	1–6
(Netherlands) Team GP Elite (Netherlands) GP Elite	25	(Netherlands) Larry ten Voorde	P	All
(Netherlands) Team GP Elite (Netherlands) GP Elite	26	(Netherlands) Jesse van Kuijk	P	All
(Netherlands) Team GP Elite (Netherlands) GP Elite	27	(Netherlands) Daan van Kuijk	P	All
(Netherlands) Team GP Elite (Netherlands) GP Elite	28	(Netherlands) Lucas Groeneveld	P	1–5, 7–8
(Netherlands) Team GP Elite (Netherlands) GP Elite	29	(Netherlands) Huub van Eijndhoven	R	All
(Germany) CarTech Motorsport by Nigrin	23	(Germany) Lukas Ertl	P	All
(Germany) CarTech Motorsport by Nigrin	84	(Kuwait) Ahmad Alshehab	PA	All
(Germany) ID Racing	40	(Finland) Jukka Honkavuori	P	All
(Germany) ID Racing	41	(Canada) Mark J. Thomas	PA	5
(Germany) ID Racing	42	(Germany) Luka Wlömer	R	6
(Germany) ID Racing	43	(Netherlands) Willem Meijer	R	7
(Germany) ID Racing	44	(Germany) Jonas Greif	R	1–4
(Germany) ID Racing	45	(Belgium) Glenn van Parijs	P	8
(Germany) IronForce Racing by Phoenix	94	(Luxembourg) Dylan Pereira	P	All
(Germany) IronForce Racing by Phoenix	95	(Germany) Richard Wagner	P	All
(Germany) IronForce Racing by Phoenix	96	(Germany) Jan-Erik Slooten	PA	All

Icon	Class
P	Pro Cup
R	Rookie
PA	Pro-Am Cup
	Guest Starter

== Results ==
Round		Circuit	Pole	Fastest lap	Overall winner	Rookie Winner	ProAm Winner
1	R1	(Belgium) Circuit de Spa-Francorchamps	(Germany) Laurin Heinrich	(Luxembourg) Dylan Pereira	(Germany) Laurin Heinrich	(Switzerland) Alexander Fach	(Luxembourg) Carlos Rivas
1	R2	(Belgium) Circuit de Spa-Francorchamps	(Germany) Laurin Heinrich	(Germany) Laurin Heinrich	(Germany) Laurin Heinrich	(Switzerland) Alexander Fach	(Luxembourg) Carlos Rivas
2	R1	(Austria) Red Bull Ring	(Netherlands) Loek Hartog	(Germany) Laurin Heinrich	(Luxembourg) Dylan Pereira	(United Kingdom) Lorcan Hanafin	(Germany) Jan-Erik Slooten
2	R2	(Austria) Red Bull Ring	(Netherlands) Morris Schuring	(Germany) Michael Ammermüller	(Germany) Laurin Heinrich	(Netherlands) Huub van Eijndhoven	(Luxembourg) Carlos Rivas
3	R1	(Italy) Imola Circuit	(Netherlands) Loek Hartog	(Netherlands) Larry ten Voorde	(Denmark) Bastian Buus	(United Kingdom) Lorcan Hanafin	(Luxembourg) Carlos Rivas
3	R2	(Italy) Imola Circuit	(Netherlands) Larry ten Voorde	(Netherlands) Larry ten Voorde	(Netherlands) Larry ten Voorde	(Netherlands) Huub van Eijndhoven	(Germany) Jan-Erik Slooten
4	R1	(Netherlands) Circuit Zandvoort	(Netherlands) Larry ten Voorde	(Netherlands) Larry ten Voorde	(Germany) Laurin Heinrich	(Germany) Alexander Tauscher	(Germany) Jan-Erik Slooten
4	R2	(Netherlands) Circuit Zandvoort	(Netherlands) Larry ten Voorde	(Netherlands) Larry ten Voorde	(Netherlands) Larry ten Voorde	(United Kingdom) Lorcan Hanafin	(Germany) Jan-Erik Slooten
5	R1	(Germany) Nürburgring	(Luxembourg) Dylan Pereira	(Germany) Laurin Heinrich	(Netherlands) Larry ten Voorde	(United Kingdom) Lorcan Hanafin	(Luxembourg) Carlos Rivas
5	R2	(Germany) Nürburgring	(Luxembourg) Dylan Pereira	(Luxembourg) Dylan Pereira	(Luxembourg) Dylan Pereira	(Netherlands) Huub van Eijndhoven	(Luxembourg) Carlos Rivas
6	R1	(Germany) Lausitzring	(Denmark) Bastian Buus	(Netherlands) Larry ten Voorde	(Luxembourg) Dylan Pereira	(Netherlands) Huub van Eijndhoven	(Germany) Jan-Erik Slooten
6	R2	(Germany) Lausitzring	(Luxembourg) Dylan Pereira	(Germany) Laurin Heinrich	(Luxembourg) Dylan Pereira	(Netherlands) Huub van Eijndhoven	(Bulgaria) Georgi Donchev
7	R1	(Germany) Sachsenring	(Germany) Laurin Heinrich	(Germany) Laurin Heinrich	(Germany) Laurin Heinrich	(Netherlands) Huub van Eijndhoven	(Luxembourg) Carlos Rivas
7	R2	(Germany) Sachsenring	(Germany) Laurin Heinrich	(Germany) Laurin Heinrich	(Germany) Laurin Heinrich	(United Kingdom) Lorcan Hanafin	(Luxembourg) Carlos Rivas
8	R1	(Germany) Hockenheimring	(Netherlands) Larry ten Voorde	(Netherlands) Larry ten Voorde	(Netherlands) Larry ten Voorde	(Germany) Alexander Tauscher	(Luxembourg) Carlos Rivas
8	R2	(Germany) Hockenheimring	(Netherlands) Larry ten Voorde	(Germany) Laurin Heinrich	(Netherlands) Larry ten Voorde	(Switzerland) Alexander Fach	(Luxembourg) Carlos Rivas

== Standings ==
=== Scoring system ===
Points were awarded to the first 15 classified drivers in the following number. Guest drivers' points were eliminated at the end of the season, so identical positions may have different point values:

Position	1st	2nd	3rd	4th	5th	6th	7th	8th	9th	10th	11th	12th	13th	14th	15th
Points	25	20	16	13	11	10	9	8	7	6	5	4	3	2	1

=== Overall ===
Pos.	Driver	Team	SPA (Belgium)		RBR (Austria)		IMO (Italy)		ZND (Netherlands)		NÜR (Germany)		LAU (Germany)		SAC (Germany)		HOC (Germany)		Points
Pos.	Driver	Team	R1	R2	R1	R2	R1	R2	R1	R2	R1	R2	R1	R2	R1	R2	R1	R2	Points
1	(Germany) Laurin Heinrich	(Germany) SSR Huber Racing	1	1	2	1	2	4	1	3	10	2	9	3	1	1	3	4	297
2	(Netherlands) Larry ten Voorde	(Netherlands) Team GP Elite	3	5	4	5	3	1	2	1	1	6	23	2	5	4	1	1	266
3	(Luxembourg) Dylan Pereira	(Germany) IronForce Racing by Phoenix	2	4	1	7	7	3	Ret	9	3	1	1	1	15	2	4	3	240
4	(Denmark) Bastian Buus	(Germany) Allied-Racing	7	3	6	4	1	7	3	2	2	5	6	14	2	6	2	2	336
5	(Netherlands) Loek Hartog	(Germany) Black Falcon	4	6	3	6	4	2	6	14	4	3	3	5	4	5	5	Ret	185
6	(Netherlands) Morris Schuring	(Germany) SSR Huber Racing	5	2	5	2	5	9	Ret	Ret	6	4	7	4	3	7	Ret	6	161
7	(Netherlands) Rudy van Buren	(Germany) Huber Racing	9	7	8	8	6	8	11	4	5	11	2	6	28	8	9	9	137
8	(Netherlands) Max van Splunteren	(Netherlands) Team GP Elite	8	11	9	9	12	5	7	6	7	7	13	DNS					82
9	(Netherlands) Huub van Eijndhoven	(Netherlands) GP Elite	14	14	Ret	10	11	11	Ret	13	9	8	8	9	6	10	8	11	82
10	(United Kingdom) Lorcan Hanafin	(Switzerland) Fach Auto Tech	21	13	10	19	8	13	8	10	8	16	12	12	23	3	7	12	78
11	(Germany) Alexander Tauscher	(Germany) Allied-Racing	15	25	12	Ret	15	26	5	11	12	9	Ret	23	7	9	6	10	70
12	(Netherlands) Jesse van Kuijk	(Netherlands) Team GP Elite	10	8	Ret	11	9	DSQ	Ret	5	11	10	Ret	8	16	11	13	13	69
13	(Germany) Michael Ammermüller	(Germany) SSR Huber Racing	6	10	7	3	19	6	9	8									66
14	(Finland) Juukka Honkavuori	(Germany) ID Racing	11	16	Ret	Ret	18	Ret	18	7	13	13	5	7	9	15	11	29	54
15	(Switzerland) Alexander Fach	(Switzerland) Fach Auto Tech	13	12	11	25	13	12	Ret	12	14	Ret	25	26	8	14	14	8	47
16	(Netherlands) Lucas Groeneveld	(Netherlands) GP Elite	12	9	14	26	10	10	4	Ret	17	14			22	Ret	18	16	41
17	(Germany) Lukas Ertl	(Germany) CarTech Motorsport by Nigrin	17	20	Ret	Ret	Ret	15	10	17	19	19	11	10	10	19	12	7	38
18	(Netherlands) Daan van Kuijk	(Netherlands) GP Elite	Ret	15	13	16	14	14	Ret	Ret	Ret	18	4	Ret	12	13	19	15	30
19	(Israel) Ariel Levi	(Germany) Huber Racing	19	17	17	13	Ret	16	Ret	18	16	12	Ret	11	11	17	16	17	16
20	(Germany) Jan-Erik Slooten	(Germany) IronForce Racing by Phoenix	22	21	18	20	21	19	14	19	27	27	10	21	14	23	28	31	10
21	(Germany) Sebastian Freymuth	(Germany) HRT Performance	24	22	15	12	Ret	24	12	24	25	20	Ret	19	20	18	24	19	9
22	(Luxembourg) Carlos Rivas	(Germany) Black Falcon	18	18	20	17	17	DSQ	Ret	20	21	15	24	29	13	12	21	18	8
23	(Austria) Hari Proczyk	(Austria) HP Racing International	20	19	Ret	15	Ret	18	13	Ret	18	Ret	14	15	18	20	20	21	6
24	(Belgium) Ghislain Cordeel	(Netherlands) Team GP Elite															15	14	5
25	(Germany) Richard Wagner	(Germany) IronForce Racing by Phoenix	16	26	24	14	Ret	23	Ret	15	15	30	18	16	17	16	17	24	4
26	(Germany) Sören Spreng	(Germany) Black Falcon	25	31	21	18	22	DSQ	15	26	22	28	16	22	Ret	24	29	30	2
27	(Germany) Jan Seyffert	(Austria) HP Racing International	27	23	16	29	16	17	Ret	16	20	17	Ret	13	Ret	Ret	23	20	1
28	(Bulgaria) Georgi Donchev	(Germany) Huber Racing	26	30	19	21	23	20	Ret	22	Ret	21	17	17	21	25	Ret	22	0
29	(Germany) Christof Langer	(Switzerland) Fach Auto Tech	Ret	28	26	27	24	25	17	25	29	25	21	27	25	27	25	26	0
30	(Germany) Mathias Jeserich	(Germany) HRT Performance	28	27															0
31	(Austria) Phillip Sager	(Germany) HRT Performance			22	23													0
32	(Canada) Mark J. Thomas	(Germany) ID Racing									30	29							0
33	(Germany) Luka Wlömer	(Germany) ID Racing											26	20					0
34	(Germany) Jonas Greif	(Germany) ID Racing (1-4) (Germany) SSR Huber Racing (5-8)	29	29	23	22	Ret	22	16	21	23	23	19	24	24	26	22	25	0
35	(Germany) Kai Pfister	(Germany) HRT Performance			27	28					26	26					27	27	0
36	(Germany) Holger Harmsen	(Germany) HRT Performance	30	32											Ret	29	30	28	0
37	(Germany) Kim Andre Hauschild	(Germany) HRT Performance					20	27	Ret	23			15	18	26	22			0
38	(Kuwait) Ahmad Al Shehab	(Germany) CarTech Motorsport by Nigrin	23	24	25	24	Ret	21	Ret	Ret	24	22	22	28	27	21	26	23	0
Guest Entries ineligible to score Points
	(Netherlands) Willem Meijer	(Germany) ID Racing													19	28			0
	(Belgium) Glenn Van Parijs	(Germany) ID Racing															10	5	0
	(Germany) Tim Stender	(Germany) HRT Motorsport (5) (Germany) HRT Performance (6)									28	24	20	25					0

== See also ==
- 2022 Porsche Supercup
