= Flynt Schuring =

Dutch racing driver (born 2006)

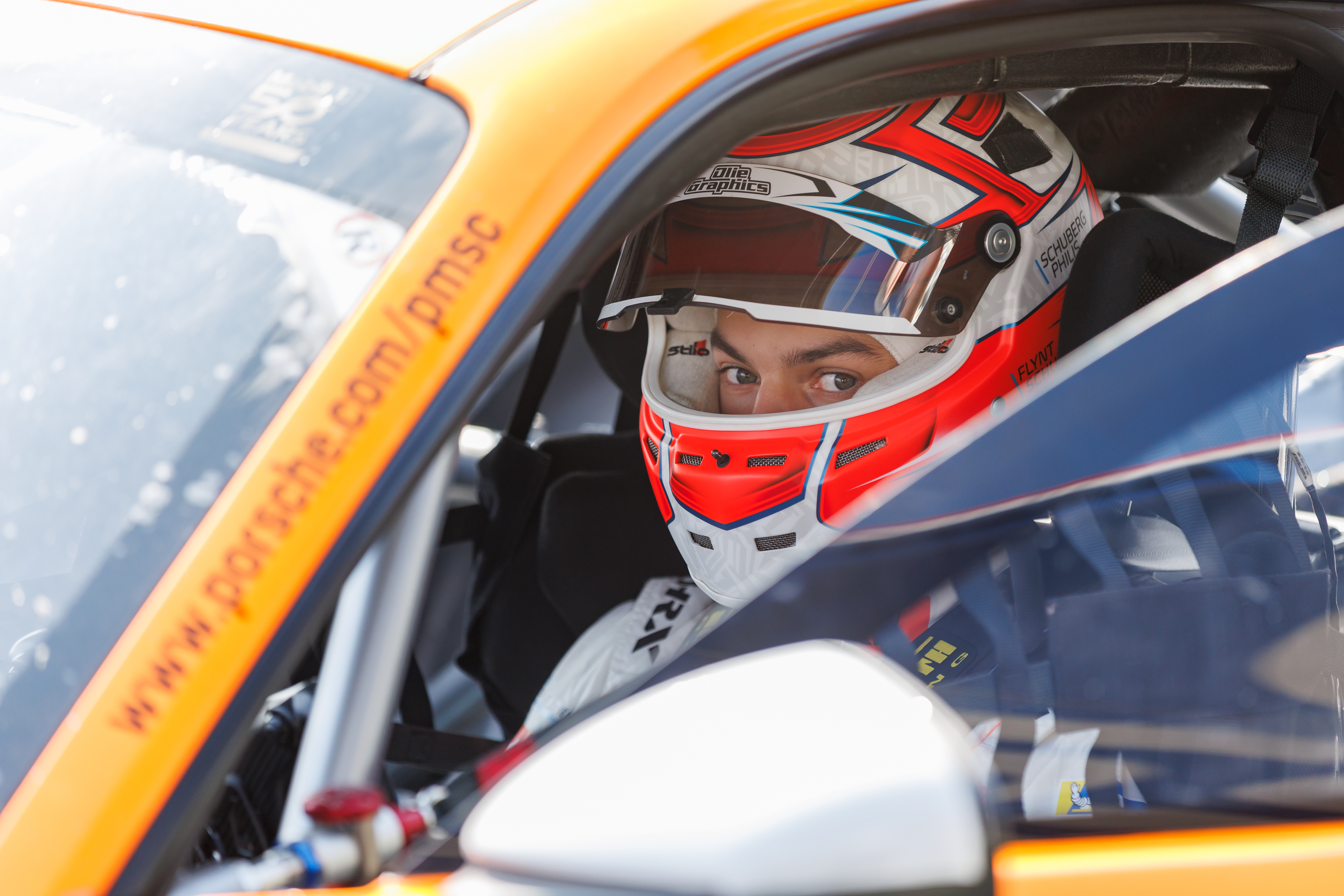
- Schuring during the 2024 Porsche Supercup round at Circuit Zandvoort
- Nationality: (Netherlands) Dutch
- Born: 12 August 2006 (age 20) Den Dolder, Netherlands
- Relatives: Gerwin Schuring (father); Morris Schuring (brother)

Porsche Supercup career
- Debut season: 2023
- Current team: Schumacher CLRT
- Categorisation: FIA Silver
- Car number: 12
- Former teams: Team Huber Racing, Proton Huber Competition
- Starts: 19
- Wins: 3
- Podiums: 8
- Poles: 4
- Fastest laps: 4
- Best finish: 1st in 2026

Flynt Schuring (born 12 August 2006) is a Dutch racing driver who competes in the Porsche Supercup and the Porsche Carrera Cup Germany with Schumacher CLRT. He is the younger brother of racing driver Morris Schuring.

Schuring won the 2026 Porsche Supercup title with Schumacher CLRT.

== Career ==
Schuring began karting at three and a half years old and made his car racing debut in the 2021 BMW M240i Cup for DayVTec Engineering, winning two races on his debut at Assen. He also won at the Circuit Zandvoort on his way to his first motorsport title.

=== Porsche competition ===
In 2022, he stepped up to one-make Porsche racing in the form of the Porsche Sprint Challenge Benelux for Huber Racing and won the championship. He renewed his partnership with Huber Racing in 2023 and kicked off his year in the Porsche Sprint Challenge Southern Europe, scoring one podium at Portimão.

Schuring's main campaign for the 2023 season was the Porsche Carrera Cup Benelux and he achieved a series-first podium in the opening round at Circuit de Spa-Francorchamps. The next round at the Hockenheimring saw him get his first pole position in the series, but the race ended in a retirement. Schuring collected another podium in the next round at Circuit Zandvoort and then three more podiums in the final three races of the season – one at Circuit Zolder and the other two at the Red Bull Ring. This propelled him to third in the overall championship standings by the end of his rookie year. He also participated in one round of the Porsche Supercup as a guest driver at his home track in Zandvoort, with his highest finish from the two races being a seventeenth in the first race.

From November 2023 to March 2024, Schuring drove in the Porsche Carrera Cup Middle East for Central Europe Racing, collecting his only two podiums in the second round of the series at Bahrain International Circuit. He also participated in the 2024 Dubai 24 Hour in the 992 class and was in contention for the podium but had to retire from the race.

With newly rebranded Proton Huber Competition, Schuring started his 2024 campaign with a Valencia cameo in the Porsche Sprint Challenge Southern Europe, which ended in a double retirement.

Schuring drove full-time in the 2024 Porsche Carrera Cup Germany, where he had consistent results that didn't pay off with a podium until the penultimate round at the Red Bull Ring, which was accompanied with a pole position and a win. Schuring ended his rookie season in eighth position and won the rookie title, beating compatriots Robert de Haan and Kas Haverkort. During the season, he partook in two guest rounds in the Porsche Supercup for Proton Huber, ending the first round at Spa-Francorchamps in a retirement but finishing his home race of Zandvoort in eighth place, but due to being a guest driver he was ineligible for points.

Alongside his PCCD duties, Schuring drove in the Porsche Carrera Cup Italia for Enrico Fulgenzi Racing but had to skip one round due to their race calendars clashing. He got a podium at Mugello and a win at Vallelunga on his way to ninth to the championship.

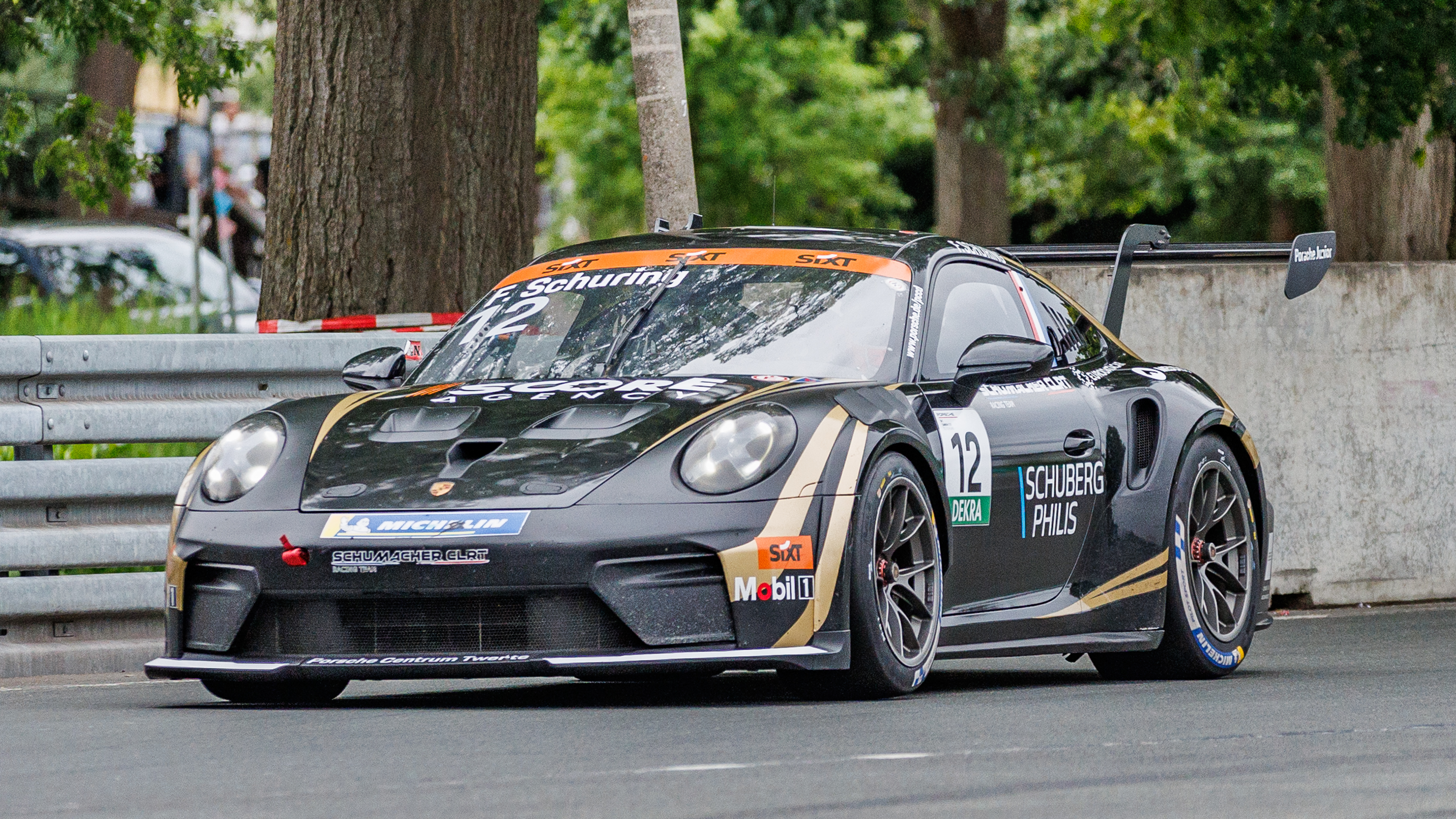
Schuring took the victory of the 12th round of the 2026 Porsche Carrera Cup Germany season at Norisring

Schuring switched to Schumacher CLRT in 2025, starting his year by dominating the Porsche Sprint Challenge Southern Europe with five wins, two pole positions and eight podiums from eight races. He competed in both the Porsche Carrera Cup Germany and the Porsche Supercup in a dual campaign, doing the full-time calendar of the Supercup for the first time.

In PCCD, Schuring kicked off his season with a podium at Imola and a pole position which was converted to a win in the following round at the Circuit de Spa-Francorchamps. At the first race of the fourth round in the Norisring, he achieved a similar feat. After two retirements, he got his campaign back on track with a double podium at the Sachsenring, where he won the opening race. These were his final podiums in the series, as he capped off his campaign with a pole position in the second race of the last round at the Hockenheimring and ended the championship in fourth.

Meanwhile, in the Porsche Supercup, Schuring achieved his first pole position in the top tier of one-make Porsche racing in the third round at Barcelona-Cataluyna, and ended the race in fifth. He got his maiden podiums – both second places – in the fifth and sixth rounds at Spa-Francorchamps and the Hungaroring. Schuring achieved a pole position and another podium in his home round at Circuit Zandvoort. He finished his first full-time season in third and became the rookies' champion.

After a successful first year in the series, Schuring earned a spot as a Porsche Junior for the 2026 season alongside Marcus Amand. He embarked on another dual campaign in the Porsche Carrera Cup Germany and the Porsche Supercup with Schumacher CLRT. In the former, he had a rough start to his campaign with double retirements in the opening round at Imola, but in the next round, he took his first win of the year, accompanied with a pole position, at the Red Bull Ring. The following round at Spa-Francorchamps, he claimed double pole positions, and converted them both to wins. His winning steak came to a close in the fourth round at Zandvoort, his home race, where he won the first race and came second in the final race. His final win of his campaign came at the sixth rounds at the Norisring, and despite his best efforts, Keagan Masters pipped him to the title by thirteen points.

Meanwhile in the Supercup, he took his first series win in the second round at Barcelona, and collected another podium in his round later at the Red Bull Ring. At Spa-Francorchamps, he converted his first pole position of his campaign in a second win. Alongside his third and final win of his campaign at Zandvoort, he took the 2026 Porsche Supercup title one round early, becoming the youngest champion to date.

== GT3 career ==
=== 2026 ===
After clinching the Porsche Supercup championship title, he made his GT3 debut in the form of a guest cameo at his home track at Circuit Zandvoort, driving in the Silver class of the GT World Challenge Europe Sprint Cup with Lionspeed GP.

== Personal life ==
His older brother, Morris Schuring, is also a racing driver, as is their father Gerwin.

== Karting record ==
=== Karting career summary ===
Season	Series	Team	Position
2019	Rotax Max Euro Trophy – Junior Max		
2019	BNL Karting Series – Junior Max		26th
2020	Rotax Max Euro Winter Cup – Senior Max	JJ Racing	33rd
2020	Rotax Max Euro Trophy – Senior Max	JJ Racing	
2020	Rotax Max Challenge International Trophy – Senior Max	JJ Racing	NC
2021	Rotax Max Euro Trophy – Senior Max	JJ Racing	28th
2021	Rotax Max Challenge International Trophy – Senior Max	JJ Racing	NC
2021	Rotax Max Euro Golden Trophy – Rotax Senior	JJ Racing	31st
2022	WSK Champions Cup – KZ2	CPB Sport	25th
2022	WSK Super Master Series – KZ2	CPB Sport	57th
2022	CIK-FIA European Championship – KZ2	CPB Sport	38th
2022	CIK-FIA World Cup – KZ2	CPB Sport	NC
2022	WSK Final Cup – KZ2	CPB Sport	44th
2023	WSK Champions Cup – KZ2	CPB Sport	10th
2023	WSK Super Master Series – KZ2	CPB Sport	47th
2023	WSK Open Cup – KZ2	CPB Sport	58th
2023	Andrea Margutti Trophy – KZ2	CPB Sport	33rd

== Racing record ==
=== Racing career summary ===
Season	Series	Team	Races	Wins	Poles	F/Laps	Podiums	Points	Position
2021	BMW M240i Cup	DayVTec Engineering	8	3	0	0	3	?	1st
2022	Porsche Sprint Challenge Benelux	Huber Racing	?	?	?	?	?	170	1st
2023	Porsche Sprint Challenge Southern Europe	Huber Racing	6	0	0	0	1	64	6th
2023	Porsche Carrera Cup Benelux	Huber Racing	12	0	1	1	5	145	3rd
2023	Porsche Supercup	Team Huber Racing	2	0	0	0	0	0	NC†
2023–24	Porsche Carrera Cup Middle East	Central Europe Racing	8	0	0	0	2	102	6th
2023–24	Middle East Trophy - 992	SebLajoux Racing by DUWO Racing	1	0	0	0	0	—N/a	NC
2024	Porsche Sprint Challenge Southern Europe	Proton Huber Competition	2	0	0	0	0	0	29th
2024	Porsche Supercup	Proton Huber Competition	2	0	0	0	0	0	NC†
2024	Porsche Carrera Cup Italy	Enrico Fulgenzi Racing	10	1	0	0	2	85	9th
2024	Porsche Carrera Cup Germany	Team Proton Huber Competition	16	1	1	0	1	136	8th
2024	Nürburgring Langstrecken-Serie - Cup3	Black Falcon	1	0	0	0	0	0	NC
2025	Porsche Sprint Challenge Southern Europe	Schumacher CLRT	8	5	2	4	8	178	**1st**
2025	Porsche Carrera Cup Germany	Schumacher CLRT	16	3	3	1	5	167	4th
2025	Porsche Supercup	Schumacher CLRT	8	0	2	1	3	103.5	**3rd**
2025	Nürburgring Langstrecken-Serie - Cup3	AV Racing by Black Falcon							
2026	Porsche Supercup	Schumacher CLRT	8	3	2	3	6	132.5	**1st**
2026	Porsche Carrera Cup Germany	Schumacher CLRT	16	5	6	9	8	217	**2nd**
2026	Nürburgring Langstrecken-Serie - Cup2	Mühlner Motorsport							
2026	GT World Challenge Europe Sprint Cup	Lionspeed GP	2	0	0	0	0	0	NC†
2026	Nürburgring Langstrecken-Serie - SP9	Dunlop Motorsports							
2026	Shanghai 8 Hours	Phantom Global Racing	1	0	0	0	0	N/A	24th
2026–27	Asian Le Mans Series - GT3	Manthey Racing							

† As Schuring was a guest driver, he was ineligible for points.

^{*} Season still in progress.

=== Complete Porsche Supercup results ===
(key) (Races in bold indicate pole position) (Races in italics indicate fastest lap)

Year	Team	1	2	3	4	5	6	7	8	Pos.	Points
2023	Team Huber Racing	MON	RBR	SIL	HUN	SPA	ZND1; 17	ZND2; 24	MNZ	NC†	0
2024	Proton Huber Competition	IMO	MON	RBR	SIL	HUN	SPA; Ret	ZND; 8	MNZ	NC†	0
2025	Schumacher CLRT	IMO; 5	MON; 9	**CAT**; 5	RBR; 6	SPA; 2	HUN; 2	**ZND**; 3	MNZ; 10	3rd	103.5
2026	Schumacher CLRT	MON; 5	CAT; 1	RBR; 2	**SPA**; 1	HUN; Ret	**ZND1**; 3	ZND2; 1	MNZ; 3	1st	132.5

^{†} As Schuring was a guest driver, he was ineligible for points.
^{*} Season still in progress.

=== Complete Porsche Carrera Cup Italia results ===
(key) (Races in bold indicate pole position) (Races in italics indicate fastest lap)

Year	Team	1	2	3	4	5	6	7	8	9	10	11	12	DC	Points
2024	Enrico Fulgenzi Racing	MIS; 1; 10	MIS; 2; 13	IMO1; 1; 20	IMO1; 2; 15	MUG; 1; 4	MUG; 2; 3	IMO2; 1	IMO2; 2	VLL; 1; 1	VLL; 2; 4	MNZ; 1 Ret	MNZ; 2; 11	9th	85

=== Complete Porsche Carrera Cup Germany results ===
(key) (Races in bold indicate pole position) (Races in italics indicate fastest lap)

Year	Team	1	2	3	4	5	6	7	8	9	10	11	12	13	14	15	16	DC	Points
2024	Team Proton Huber Competition	IMO; 1; 10	IMO; 2; 7	OSC; 1; 10	OSC; 2; 20	ZAN; 1; 5	ZAN; 2; 8	HUN; 1 Ret	HUN; 2; 7	NÜR; 1; 5	NÜR; 2; 8	SAC; 1; 4	SAC; 2; 12	RBR; 1; 14	**RBR**; **2**; 1	HOC; 1; 5	HOC; 2; 4	8th	136
2025	Schumacher CLRT	IMO; 1; 11	IMO; 2; 2	SPA; 1; 17	**SPA**; **2**; 1	ZAN; 1; 4	ZAN; 2; 22	**NOR**; **1**; 1	NOR; 2 Ret	NÜR; 1 Ret	NÜR; 2; 12	**SAC**; **1**; 1	SAC; 2; 2	RBR; 1; 6	RBR; 2; 6	HOC; 1; 7	**HOC**; **2**; 26	4th	167
2026	Schumacher CLRT	IMO; 1 Ret	IMO; 2 Ret	RBR; 1; 10	**RBR**; **2**; 1	**SPA**; **1**; 1	**SPA**; **2**; 1	ZAN; 1; 1	ZAN; 2; 2	**LAU**; **1**; 3	**LAU**; **2** Ret	NOR; 1; 3	**NOR**; **2**; 1	NÜR; 1; 7	NÜR; 2; 5	HOC; 1; 7	HOC; 2; 11	2nd	217

^{*}Season still in progress.

=== Complete GT World Challenge Europe results ===
==== GT World Challenge Europe Sprint Cup ====
(key) (Races in bold indicate pole position) (Races in italics indicate fastest lap)

Year	Team	Car	Class	1	2	3	4	5	6	7	8	9	10	Pos.	Points
2026	Lionspeed GP	Porsche 911 GT3 R (992.2)	Silver	BRH; 1	BRH; 2	MIS; 1	MIS; 2	MAG; 1	MAG; 2	ZAN; 1; 27	ZAN; 2 Ret	CAT; 1	CAT; 2	NC‡	0‡
