= 2026 Porsche Carrera Cup Italia =

Motor racing event held in Italy

The 2026 Porsche Carrera Cup Italia was a motor racing championship held in Italy. It was the 20th season of the Porsche Carrera Cup Italia. The season began at Autodromo Enzo e Dino Ferrari on 24 April and finished at Autodromo Internazionale del Mugello on 1 November.

== Teams and drivers ==
Team	No.	Driver	Class	Rounds
(Italy) Ebimotors	3	(Italy) Alberto Cerqui	P	All
(Italy) Ebimotors	51	(Italy) Paolo Gnemmi	M	1
(Italy) Ebimotors	67	(Italy) Alex De Giacomi	M	All
(Italy) Ebimotors	75	(Italy) Andrea Galli	M	All
(Italy) The Driving Experiences	4	(Netherlands) Paul de Prenter	P R	All
(Italy) The Driving Experiences	7	(Italy) Marco Butti	P R	1–3, 5–6
(Italy) The Driving Experiences	7	(Israel) Ariel Levi	P	4
(Italy) The Driving Experiences	9	(Denmark) Hjelte Hoffner	P	6
(Italy) The Driving Experiences	50	(Italy) Francesco Maria Fenici	M	1–5
(Italy) PMA Motorsport	5	(Canada) Nicolas Taylor	P R	2
(Italy) PMA Motorsport	6	(Canada) Zachary Taylor	P R	2
(Italy) / Team Q8 Hi Perform (Note: Car No. 8 entered as Team Q8 Hi Perform, and cars No. 18, 19, 25, and 35 entered as Dinamic Motorsport.); (Italy) / Dinamic Motorsport	8	(Italy) Pietro Delli Guanti	P	All
(Italy) / Team Q8 Hi Perform; (Italy) / Dinamic Motorsport	18	(Italy) William Mezzetti	P	All
(Italy) / Team Q8 Hi Perform; (Italy) / Dinamic Motorsport	19	(Italy) Andrea D'Amico	P R	1–4
(Italy) / Team Q8 Hi Perform; (Italy) / Dinamic Motorsport	19	(Australia) Max Geoghegan	P R	5
(Italy) / Team Q8 Hi Perform; (Italy) / Dinamic Motorsport	19	(Italy) Eugenio Pisani	P	6
(Italy) / Team Q8 Hi Perform; (Italy) / Dinamic Motorsport	25	(San Marino) Lorenzo Cheli	P	All
(Italy) / Team Q8 Hi Perform; (Italy) / Dinamic Motorsport	35	(Italy) Andrea Bristot	P R	All
(Italy) BeDriver	10	(Germany) Lirim Zendeli	P	All
(Italy) BeDriver	21	(Italy) Diego Bertonelli	P	All
(Italy) BeDriver	80	(Mexico) Horia Traian Chirigut	M	1
(Italy) BeDriver	80	(United Kingdom) Lee Mowle	M	2–4, 6
(Italy) Ombra Racing	11	(United Kingdom) Callum Voisin	P R	1, 3–6
(Italy) Ombra Racing	11	(Romania) Filip Ugran	P	2
(Italy) Ombra Racing	12	(Argentina) Luciano Martinez	P	All
(Italy) Ombra Racing	30	(Switzerland) Karen Gaillard	P R	All
(Italy) Ombra Racing	33	(Netherlands) Nathan Schaap	P	All
(Italy) Target Srl	14	(Netherlands) Senna van Soelen	P R	All
(Italy) Target Srl	15	(Italy) Aldo Festante	P	All
(Italy) Target Srl	24	(Italy) Filippo Fant	P	1–4
(Italy) Target Srl	24	(Germany) Max Mutschlechner	P R	5–6
(Italy) Malucelli Motorsport	17	(Hungary) Benjamin Berta	P R	All
(Italy) Malucelli Motorsport	54	(Italy) Stefano Stefanelli	M	All
(Italy) Enrico Fulgenzi Racing	20	(United Kingdom) Harley Haughton	P R	All
(Italy) Enrico Fulgenzi Racing	49	(United Arab Emirates) Enrico Fulgenzi	P	3
(Italy) Enrico Fulgenzi Racing	88	(Italy) Andrea Girondi	M	All
(Italy) Omnia Motorsport	22	(Italy) Ermanno Quintieri	P R	All
(Italy) Omnia Motorsport	31	(Italy) Cristian Bertuca	P R	1–4, 6
(Italy) Prima Ghinzani Motorsport	28	(Italy) Giorgio Amati	P	1–3
(Italy) Prima Ghinzani Motorsport	32	(Italy) Gianmarco Quaresmini	P	All
(Italy) Prima Ghinzani Motorsport	38	(Italy) Simone Iaquinta	P	5
(Italy) Prima Ghinzani Motorsport	38	(Germany) Alexander Tauscher	P	6
(Italy) Prima Ghinzani Motorsport	56	(Italy) Cesare Brusa	M	All

Icon	Class
P	Pro Cup
R	Rookie
M	Michelin Cup
	Guest Starter

== Calendar ==
Round	Circuit	Date	Map of circuit locations
1	(Emilia-Romagna) Autodromo Enzo e Dino Ferrari, Imola	24–26 April	2026 Porsche Carrera Cup Italia is located in Italy
2	(Emilia-Romagna) Misano World Circuit, Misano Adriatico	8–10 May	2026 Porsche Carrera Cup Italia is located in Italy
3	(Lombardy) Autodromo Nazionale di Monza, Monza	19–21 June	2026 Porsche Carrera Cup Italia is located in Italy
4	(Lazio) Autodromo Vallelunga Piero Taruffi, Campagnano di Roma	3–5 July	2026 Porsche Carrera Cup Italia is located in Italy
5	(Emilia-Romagna) Misano World Circuit, Misano Adriatico	18–20 September	2026 Porsche Carrera Cup Italia is located in Italy
6	(Tuscany) Autodromo Internazionale del Mugello, Scarperia e San Piero	30 October – 1 November	2026 Porsche Carrera Cup Italia is located in Italy

== Race results ==
Round		Circuit	Pole position	Fastest lap	Overall winner	Winning team	Michelin Cup winner	Rookie winner
1	R1	(Emilia-Romagna) Autodromo Enzo e Dino Ferrari	(Netherlands) Senna van Soelen (Note: Pietro Delli Guanti set the fastest time in qualifying but received a 3-place grid penalty for not slowing down under yellow flags. Senna van Soelen, who set the second fastest time, started the race from first place and was awarded the two points for pole position.)	(Netherlands) Senna van Soelen	(Italy) Gianmarco Quaresmini (Note: Senna van Soelen was the first driver to cross the finish line, but received a 5-second time penalty for a restart infringement. Gianmarco Quaresmini, who was the second driver to cross the finish line, thus inherited the win.)	(Italy) Prima Ghinzani Motorsport	(Italy) Cesare Brusa	(Italy) Andrea Bristot
1	R2	(Emilia-Romagna) Autodromo Enzo e Dino Ferrari	(Netherlands) Senna van Soelen	(Italy) Andrea Bristot (Note: Pietro Delli Guanti and Andrea Bristot set identical fastest laps in the race. Bristot was credited with the fastest lap by virtue of setting his lap first and was awarded the point for fastest lap.)	(Netherlands) Senna van Soelen	(Italy) Target Srl	(Italy) Cesare Brusa	(Netherlands) Senna van Soelen
2	R3	(Emilia-Romagna) Misano World Circuit	(Italy) Andrea Bristot	(Italy) Aldo Festante	(Italy) Andrea Bristot	(Italy) Dinamic Motorsport	(Italy) Cesare Brusa	(Italy) Andrea Bristot
2	R4	(Emilia-Romagna) Misano World Circuit	(Italy) Andrea Bristot	(Netherlands) Senna van Soelen	(Italy) Andrea Bristot	(Italy) Dinamic Motorsport	(Italy) Andrea Girondi	(Italy) Andrea Bristot
3	R5	(Lombardy) Autodromo Nazionale di Monza	(Italy) Andrea Bristot	(Italy) Andrea Bristot	(Italy) Andrea Bristot	(Italy) Dinamic Motorsport	(Italy) Andrea Girondi	(Italy) Andrea Bristot
3	R6	(Lombardy) Autodromo Nazionale di Monza	(Italy) Andrea Bristot	(Italy) Andrea Bristot	(Italy) Andrea Bristot	(Italy) Dinamic Motorsport	(Italy) Cesare Brusa	(Italy) Andrea Bristot
4	R7	(Lazio) Autodromo Vallelunga Piero Taruffi	(Italy) Andrea Bristot	(Germany) Lirim Zendeli	(Italy) Pietro Delli Guanti (Note: Andrea Bristot was the first driver to cross the finish line, but received two time penalties amounting to a total of 21 seconds for separate infringements. Pietro Delli Guanti, who was the second driver to cross the finish line, thus inherited the win.)	(Italy) Team Q8 Hi Perform	(Italy) Stefano Stefanelli	(Netherlands) Senna van Soelen
4	R8	(Lazio) Autodromo Vallelunga Piero Taruffi	(Italy) Pietro Delli Guanti (Note: Andrea Bristot set the fastest time in qualifying but received a 5-place grid penalty for accumulation of penalty points on his license. Pietro Delli Guanti, who set the second fastest time, started the race from first place and was awarded the two points for pole position.)	(Netherlands) Senna van Soelen	(Netherlands) Senna van Soelen	(Italy) Target Srl	(Italy) Andrea Girondi	(Netherlands) Senna van Soelen
5	R9	(Emilia-Romagna) Misano World Circuit	(Italy) Andrea Bristot	(Italy) Andrea Bristot	(Italy) Andrea Bristot	(Italy) Dinamic Motorsport	(Italy) Alex De Giacomi	(Italy) Andrea Bristot
5	R10	(Emilia-Romagna) Misano World Circuit	(Italy) Andrea Bristot	(Italy) Pietro Delli Guanti	(Netherlands) Senna van Soelen	(Italy) Target Srl	(Italy) Stefano Stefanelli	(Netherlands) Senna van Soelen
6	R11	(Tuscany) Autodromo Internazionale del Mugello	(Italy) Pietro Delli Guanti	(Italy) Andrea Bristot	(Italy) Andrea Bristot	(Italy) Dinamic Motorsport	(Italy) Stefano Stefanelli	(Italy) Andrea Bristot
6	R12	(Tuscany) Autodromo Internazionale del Mugello	(Italy) Andrea Bristot	(Netherlands) Senna van Soelen	(Italy) Andrea Bristot	(Italy) Dinamic Motorsport	(Italy) Alex De Giacomi	(Italy) Andrea Bristot

== Championship standings ==
=== Scoring system ===
Eleven best finishes count for the Overall, Michelin Cup and Rookies' classifications.

Position	**1st**	**2nd**	**3rd**	**4th**	**5th**	**6th**	**7th**	**8th**	**9th**	**10th**	**11th**	**12th**	**13th**	**14th**	**15th**	Pole	FL
Points	25	20	17	14	12	10	9	8	7	6	5	4	3	2	1	2	1

The points table for Michelin Cup classification is as follows:

Position	**1st**	**2nd**	**3rd**	**4th**	**5th**	**6th**	**7th**	**8th**	**9th**	**10th**
Points	15	12	10	8	6	5	4	3	2	1

=== Drivers' Championship ===
Pos	Driver	Team	IMO (Emilia-Romagna)		MIS1 (Emilia-Romagna)		MON (Lombardy)		VAL (Lazio)		MIS2 (Emilia-Romagna)		MUG (Tuscany)		Pts
Pos	Driver	Team	R1	R2	R3	R4	R5	R6	R7	R8	R9	R10	R11	R12	Pts
1	(Italy) Andrea Bristot	(Italy) Dinamic Motorsport	3	3	**1**	**1**	**1**	**1**	**24**	5	**1**	**4**	1	**1**	256
2	(Italy) Pietro Delli Guanti	(Italy) Team Q8 Hi Perform	2	2	2	4	9	10	1	**2**	2	2	**2**	4	205
3	(Netherlands) Senna van Soelen	(Italy) Target Srl	**4**	**1**	13	27†	2	Ret	2	1	Ret	1	3	2	177
4	(Italy) Gianmarco Quaresmini	(Italy) Prima Ghinzani Motorsport	1	5	5	7	7	3	9	3	6	14	7	7	136
5	(Italy) Aldo Festante	(Italy) Target Srl	Ret	7	4	3	4	2	20	4	17	7	6	6	118
6	(United Kingdom) Harley Haughton	(Italy) Enrico Fulgenzi Racing	7	6	3	2	Ret	4	3	Ret	8	17	4	16	106
7	(Germany) Lirim Zendeli	(Italy) BeDriver	6	4	28†	10	6	8	5	16	3	5	24	DNS	90
8	(Italy) Diego Bertonelli	(Italy) BeDriver	5	10	7	14	5	24	7	7	9	6	17	5	88
9	(United Kingdom) Callum Voisin	(Italy) Ombra Racing	22	9			3	25†	4	Ret	4	8	8	3	85
10	(Italy) Alberto Cerqui	(Italy) Ebimotors	Ret	11	15	11	11	7	6	6	7	3	5	DSQ	83
11	(Italy) Marco Butti	(Italy) The Driving Experiences	9	13	6	5	8	13			5	18	10	12	65
12	(Italy) Filippo Fant	(Italy) Target Srl	26†	12	10	9	24	5	13	9					39
13	(Italy) Cristian Bertuca	(Italy) Omnia Motorsport	8	15	16	6	10	26†	10	14			13	13	39
14	(Netherlands) Nathan Schaap	(Italy) Ombra Racing	Ret	14	8	8	12	22	Ret	8	10	22†	15	Ret	37
15	(Italy) William Mezzetti	(Italy) Dinamic Motorsport	Ret	17	26†	16	19	27†	8	11	11	9	9	Ret	32
16	(Italy) Giorgio Amati	(Italy) Prima Ghinzani Motorsport	10	8	9	18	Ret	12							25
17	(Argentina) Luciano Martinez	(Italy) Ombra Racing	12	28	27†	DNS	25	9	14	18	13	Ret	Ret	8	24
18	(Hungary) Benjamin Berta	(Italy) Malucelli Motorsport	16	21	12	Ret	15	15	18	13	19	11	Ret	9	21
19	(Netherlands) Paul de Prenter	(Italy) The Driving Experiences	21	22	Ret	28†	Ret	28†	11	10	Ret	10	12	Ret	21
20	(Italy) Andrea D'Amico	(Italy) Dinamic Motorsport	15	18	Ret	13	20	6	12	17					18
21	(San Marino) Lorenzo Cheli	(Italy) Dinamic Motorsport	14	20	14	17	Ret	16	22	22	12	Ret	19	11	13
22	(Germany) Max Mutschlechner	(Italy) Target Srl									14	12	11	18	11
23	(Canada) Nicolas Taylor	(Italy) PMA Motorsport			11	12									9
24	(Italy) Cesare Brusa	(Italy) Prima Ghinzani Motorsport	13	19	17	Ret	16	11	25	23	22	20†	Ret	15	9
25	(Italy) Andrea Girondi	(Italy) Enrico Fulgenzi Racing	20	Ret	19	22	13	14	19	12	23	19†	23	22	9
26	(Italy) Alex De Giacomi	(Italy) Ebimotors	19	23	18	26	17	17	23	21	18	21†	Ret	10	6
27	(Italy) Ermanno Quintieri	(Italy) Omnia Motorsport	11	16	Ret	20	Ret	Ret	Ret	DNS	16	Ret	Ret	17	5
28	(Italy) Stefano Stefanelli	(Italy) Malucelli Motorsport	17	24	21	Ret	22	21	16	19	20	13	18	14	5
29	(Switzerland) Karen Gaillard	(Italy) Ombra Racing	Ret	DNS	20	21	14	19	17	15	25	16	22	20	3
30	(Denmark) Hjelte Hoffner	(Italy) The Driving Experiences											14	DSQ	2
31	(Italy) Simone Iaquinta	(Italy) Prima Ghinzani Motorsport									15	15			2
32	(Romania) Filip Ugran	(Italy) Ombra Racing			25†	15									1
33	(Israel) Ariel Levi	(Italy) The Driving Experiences							15	Ret					1
34	(Italy) Eugenio Pisani	(Italy) Dinamic Motorsport											16	21	0
35	(Italy) Francesco Maria Fenici	(Italy) The Driving Experiences	23	26	22	23	21	18	21	20	24	25†			0
36	(Italy) Paulo Gnemmi	(Italy) Ebimotors	18	25											0
37	(United Arab Emirates) Enrico Fulgenzi	(Italy) Enrico Fulgenzi Racing					18	Ret							0
38	(Italy) Andrea Galli	(Italy) Ebimotors	24	27	24	24	23	23	27	Ret	26	23†	20	19	0
39	(Canada) Zachary Taylor	(Italy) PMA Motorsport			Ret	19									0
40	(United Kingdom) Lee Mowle	(Italy) BeDriver			23	25	26	20	26	24					0
41	(Australia) Max Geoghegan	(Italy) Dinamic Motorsport									21	24†			0
42	(Mexico) Horia Traian Chirigut	(Italy) BeDriver	25	29†											0
43	(Germany) Alexander Tauscher	(Italy) Prima Ghinzani Motorsport											25	DNS	0
Pos	Driver	Team	IMO (Emilia-Romagna)		MIS1 (Emilia-Romagna)		MON (Lombardy)		VAL (Lazio)		MIS2 (Emilia-Romagna)		MUG (Tuscany)		Pts

Colour	Result
Gold	Winner
Silver	Second place
Bronze	Third place
Green	Points classification
Blue	Non-points classification
Blue	Non-classified finish (NC)
Purple	Retired, not classified (Ret)
Red	Did not qualify (DNQ)
Red	Did not pre-qualify (DNPQ)
Black	Disqualified (DSQ)
White	Did not start (DNS)
White	Withdrew (WD)
White	Race cancelled (C)
Blank	Did not practice (DNP)
Blank	Did not arrive (DNA)
Blank	Excluded (EX)

**Bold** – Pole

Italics – Fastest Lap

† — Did not finish, but classified

=== Michelin Cup ===
Pos	Driver	Team	IMO (Emilia-Romagna)		MIS1 (Emilia-Romagna)		MON (Lombardy)		VAL (Lazio)		MIS2 (Emilia-Romagna)		MUG (Tuscany)		Pts
Pos	Driver	Team	R1	R2	R3	R4	R5	R6	R7	R8	R9	R10	R11	R12	Pts
1	(Italy) Stefano Stefanelli	(Italy) Malucelli Motorsport	2	3	4	Ret	5	6	1	2	2	1	1	2	122
2	(Italy) Andrea Girondi	(Italy) Enrico Fulgenzi Racing	5	Ret	3	1	1	2	2	1	4	2	4	5	119
3	(Italy) Cesare Brusa	(Italy) Prima Ghinzani Motorsport	1	1	1	Ret	2	1	5	5	3	3	Ret	3	114
4	(Italy) Alex De Giacomi	(Italy) Ebimotors	4	2	2	5	3	3	4	4	1	4	Ret	1	112
5	(Italy) Francesco Maria Fenici	(Italy) The Driving Experiences	6	5	5	2	4	4	3	3	5	6			76
6	(Italy) Andrea Galli	(Italy) Ebimotors	7	6	7	3	6	7	7	Ret	6	5	2	4	67
7	(United Kingdom) Lee Mowle	(Italy) BeDriver			6	4	7	5	6	6			3	6	48
8	(Italy) Paolo Gnemmi	(Italy) Ebimotors	3	4											18
9	(Mexico) Horia Traian Chirigut	(Italy) BeDriver	8	7											7
Pos	Driver	Team	IMO (Emilia-Romagna)		MIS1 (Emilia-Romagna)		MON (Lombardy)		VAL (Lazio)		MIS2 (Emilia-Romagna)		MUG (Tuscany)		Pts

=== Rookie ===
Pos	Driver	Team	IMO (Emilia-Romagna)		MIS1 (Emilia-Romagna)		MON (Lombardy)		VAL (Lazio)		MIS2 (Emilia-Romagna)		MUG (Tuscany)		Pts
Pos	Driver	Team	R1	R2	R3	R4	R5	R6	R7	R8	R9	R10	R11	R12	Pts
1	(Italy) Andrea Bristot	(Italy) Dinamic Motorsport	3	3	**1**	**1**	**1**	**1**	**24**	5	**1**	**4**	1	**1**	256
2	(Netherlands) Senna van Soelen	(Italy) Target Srl	**4**	**1**	13	27	2	Ret	2	1	Ret	1	3	2	177
3	(United Kingdom) Harley Haughton	(Italy) Enrico Fulgenzi Racing	7	6	3	2	Ret	4	3	Ret	8	17	4	16	109
4	(United Kingdom) Callum Voisin	(Italy) Ombra Racing	22	9			3	25	4	Ret	4	8	8	3	85
5	(Italy) Marco Butti	(Italy) The Driving Experiences	9	13	6	5	8	13			5	18	10	12	65
6	(Italy) Cristian Bertuca	(Italy) Omnia Motorsport	8	15	16	6	10	26	10	14			13	13	39
7	(Hungary) Benjamin Berta	(Italy) Malucelli Motorsport	16	21	12	Ret	15	15	18	13	19	11	Ret	9	21
8	(Netherlands) Paul de Prenter	(Italy) The Driving Experiences	21	22	Ret	28	Ret	28	11	10	Ret	10	12	Ret	21
9	(Italy) Andrea D'Amico	(Italy) Dinamic Motorsport	15	18	Ret	13	20	6	12	17					18
10	(Germany) Max Mutschlechner	(Italy) Target Srl									14	12	11	18	11
11	(Canada) Nicolas Taylor	(Italy) PMA Motorsport			11	12									9
12	(Italy) Ermanno Quintieri	(Italy) Omnia Motorsport	11	16	Ret	20	Ret	Ret	Ret	DNS	16	Ret	Ret	17	5
13	(Switzerland) Karen Gaillard	(Italy) Ombra Racing	Ret	DNS	20	21	14	19	17	15	25	16	22	20	3
14	(Romania) Filip Ugran	(Italy) Ombra Racing			25	15									1
15	(Canada) Zachary Taylor	(Italy) PMA Motorsport			Ret	19									0
16	(Australia) Max Geoghegan	(Italy) Dinamic Motorsport									21	24			0
Pos	Driver	Team	IMO (Emilia-Romagna)		MIS1 (Emilia-Romagna)		MON (Lombardy)		VAL (Lazio)		MIS2 (Emilia-Romagna)		MUG (Tuscany)		Pts

=== Teams' Championship ===
Pos	Team	IMO (Emilia-Romagna)		MIS1 (Emilia-Romagna)		MON (Lombardy)		VAL (Lazio)		MIS2 (Emilia-Romagna)		MUG (Tuscany)		Pts
Pos	Team	R1	R2	R3	R4	R5	R6	R7	R8	R9	R10	R11	R12	Pts
1	(Italy) Target Srl	3	1	3	3	2	2	1	1	13	1	2	2	316
1	(Italy) Target Srl	Ret	6	10	17	4	Ret	15	3	Ret	6	5	5	316
2	(Italy) Dinamic Motorsport	2	2	1	1	1	1	7	4	1	3	1	1	290
2	(Italy) Dinamic Motorsport	Ret	15	17	12	15	17	17	9	10	8	8	Ret	290
3	(Italy) BeDriver	4	3	6	8	5	6	4	6	2	4	13	4	216
3	(Italy) BeDriver	5	9	18	10	6	14	6	13	8	5	16	DNS	216
4	(Italy) Prima Ghinzani Motorsport	1	4	4	6	7	3	8	2	5	12	6	6	197
4	(Italy) Prima Ghinzani Motorsport	9	7	8	13	Ret	7	18	16	11	13	17	DNS	197
5	(Italy) Enrico Fulgenzi Racing	6	5	2	2	12	4	2	10	7	14	3	12	155
5	(Italy) Enrico Fulgenzi Racing	14	Ret	14	15	Ret	9	14	Ret	17	16	15	14	155
6	(Italy) Ombra Racing	16	8	7	7	3	13	3	7	3	7	7	3	150
6	(Italy) Ombra Racing	Ret	12	16	11	11	15	Ret	Ret	9	18	12	Ret	150
7	(Italy) The Driving Experiences	8	11	5	4	8	8	10	8	4	9	9	9	117
7	(Italy) The Driving Experiences	15	17	Ret	18	Ret	18	11	Ret	Ret	15	10	Ret	117
8	(Italy) Ebimotors	13	10	11	9	10	5	5	5	6	2	4	8	103
8	(Italy) Ebimotors	Ret	18	13	16	14	11	16	15	14	17	Ret	DSQ	103
9	(Italy) Omnia Motorsport	7	13	12	5	9	16	9	12	12	Ret	11	10	74
9	(Italy) Omnia Motorsport	10	14	Ret	14	Ret	Ret	Ret	DNS			Ret	13	74
10	(Italy) Malucelli Motorsport	11	16	9	Ret	13	10	12	11	15	10	14	7	72
10	(Italy) Malucelli Motorsport	12	19	15	Ret	16	12	13	14	16	11	Ret	11	72
Pos	Team	IMO (Emilia-Romagna)		MIS1 (Emilia-Romagna)		MON (Lombardy)		VAL (Lazio)		MIS2 (Emilia-Romagna)		MUG (Tuscany)		Pts
