= 2026 Porsche Supercup =

34th season of Porsche Supercup

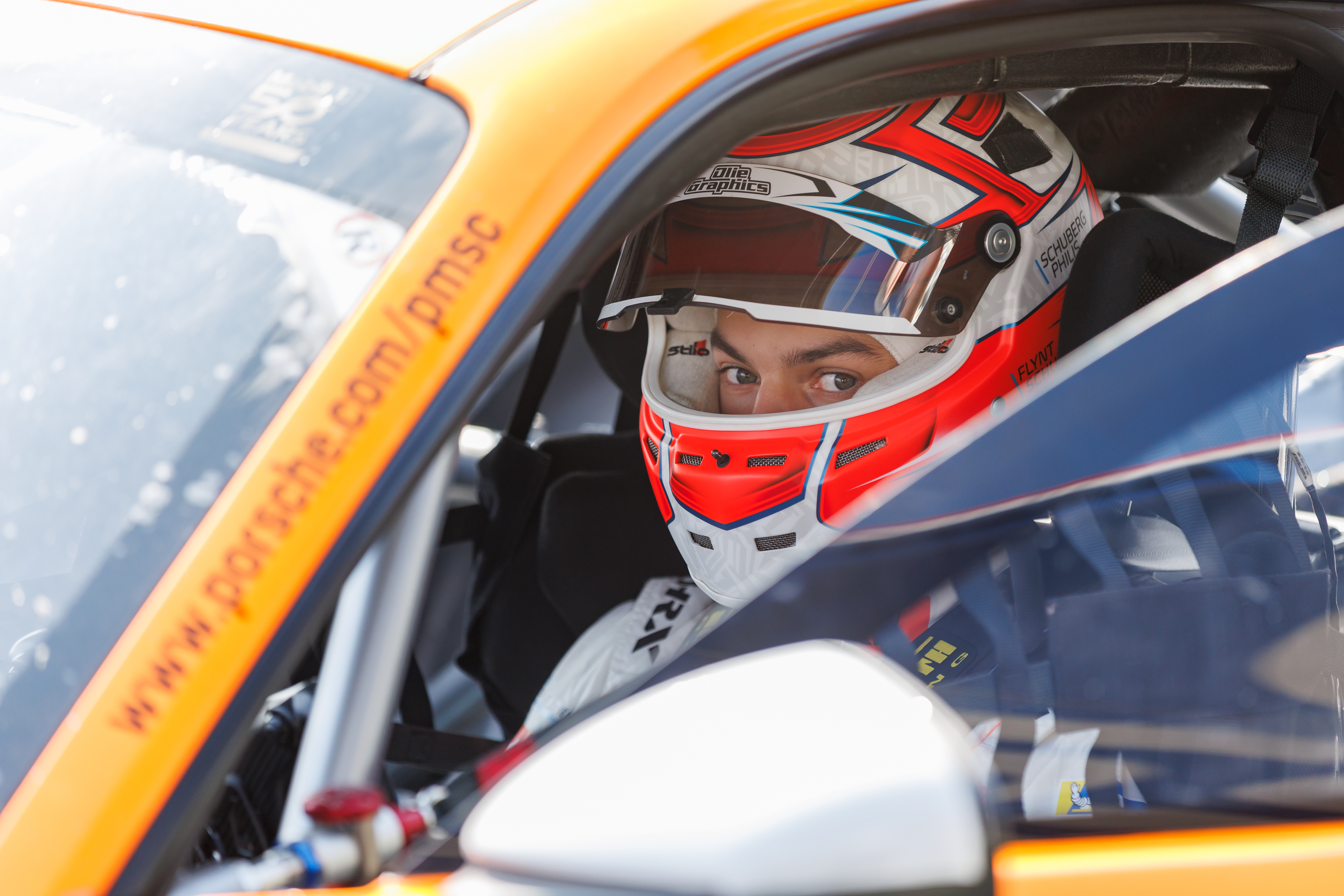
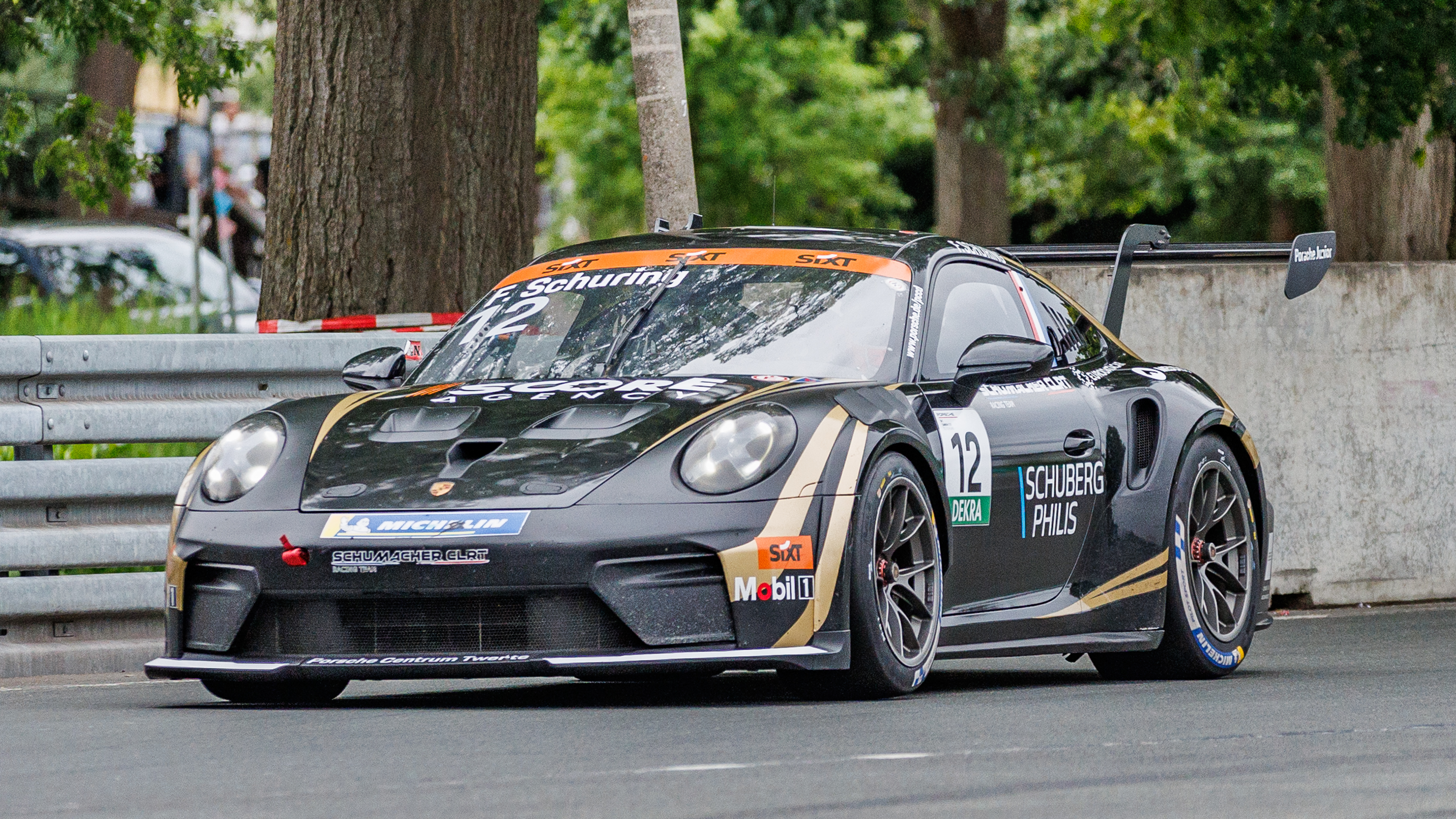
Flynt Schuring won the Drivers' Championship, and Schumacher CLRT won the Teams' Championship.

The 2026 Porsche Mobil 1 Supercup was the 34th Porsche Supercup season, a GT3 production one-make stock car racing series sanctioned by Porsche Motorsports GmbH in the world. It began on 4 June at Circuit de Monaco, Monaco and finished on 6 September at the Autodromo Nazionale di Monza, Italy, after eight races, all of which were support events for the 2026 Formula One World Championship.

The 2026 season is the first with the new Porsche 911 Cup (992.2), which is based on the 992.2 generation of the 911 and also the 25th consecutive season of Michelin tyre supply partnership since 2002 season.

The Drivers Championship was won by Dutch driver Flynt Schuring, driving for the Schumacher CLRT team. Schuring finished 25.5 points ahead of compatriot Robert de Haan for BWT Lechner Racing, with Martinet by Alméras driver Theo Oeverhaus taking third in the overall standings, 37.5 points behind Schuring.

Chester Kieffer won the Rookies Championship, also driving for Schumacher CLRT, finishing 15 points in front of Paul Cauhaupé. Schumacher CLRT completed a sweep of all titles by winning the Teams Championship with a 29 point gap over Martinet by Alméras.

== Teams and drivers ==
Team	No.	Drivers	Class	Rounds
(Austria) BWT Lechner Racing	1	(Netherlands) Robert de Haan		All
(Austria) BWT Lechner Racing	2	(Finland) Marcus Amand	R	All
(Austria) BWT Lechner Racing	3	(Australia) Caleb Sumich	R	All
(Germany) Proton Competition	4	(South Africa) Keagan Masters		All
(Germany) Proton Competition	5	(Germany) Kai Pfister		All
(Germany) Proton Competition	6	(Germany) Alexander Tauscher	G	2–3
(Germany) Proton Competition	6	(Netherlands) Michael Verhagen	G	6–7
(Germany) Proton Competition	6	(Italy) Andrea Galli	G	8
(Germany) Proton Competition	6	(United States) Rodin Younessi	G	1
(Germany) Proton Competition	30	(United States) Rodin Younessi	G	3
(Italy) Dinamic Motorsport	7	(Italy) Andrea Bristot	R	All
(Italy) Dinamic Motorsport	8	(Italy) William Mezzetti	R	All
(Italy) Dinamic Motorsport	9	(Italy) Eugenio Pisani	G	1–2, 4–5
(Italy) Dinamic Motorsport	9	(Italy) Gianmarco Quaresmini	G	3, 8
(Italy) Dinamic Motorsport	9	(Netherlands) Niels Troost	G	6–7
(France) Schumacher CLRT	11	(Luxembourg) Chester Kieffer	R	All
(France) Schumacher CLRT	12	(Netherlands) Flynt Schuring		All
(Spain) RGB Racing	13	(Spain) Jorge Ramírez		All
(Spain) RGB Racing	14	(Colombia) Juan Pablo Vega Dieppa		All
(France) Martinet by Alméras	15	(Germany) Theo Oeverhaus		All
(France) Martinet by Alméras	16	(France) Paul Cauhaupé	R	All
(France) Martinet by Alméras	17	(Netherlands) Jaap van Lagen		All
(Italy) Ombra Racing	18	(United Kingdom) Liam McNeilly	R	All
(Italy) Ombra Racing	19	(Argentina) Luciano Martinez	R	All
(Italy) Ombra Racing	20	(Romania) Filip Ugran	R	1–7
(Italy) Ombra Racing	20	(United States) Henry Wheeler	G	8
(Germany) Looping by CarTech	21	(Japan) Taichi Watarai	G	1
(Germany) Looping by CarTech	21	(Finland) Jukka Honkavuori	G	2, 5, 8
(Germany) Looping by CarTech	21	(Netherlands) Bert de Heus	G	3
(Germany) Looping by CarTech	21	(Germany) Alexander Tauscher	G	4
(Germany) Looping by CarTech	21	(Netherlands) Paul de Prenter	G	6–7
(Germany) Looping by CarTech	22	(Netherlands) Dirk Schouten		All
(Netherlands) GP Elite (Netherlands) Team GP Elite	23	(Australia) Samer Shahin		All
(Netherlands) GP Elite (Netherlands) Team GP Elite	24	(Germany) Jonas Greif	R	All
(Netherlands) GP Elite (Netherlands) Team GP Elite	25	(Netherlands) Wouter Boerekamps		All
(Netherlands) GP Elite (Netherlands) Team GP Elite	26	(United Kingdom) Gustav Burton		All
(Netherlands) GP Elite (Netherlands) Team GP Elite	27	(Brazil) Matheus Ferreira	R	All
(Netherlands) GP Elite (Netherlands) Team GP Elite	31	(Germany) Maik Rosenberg	G	4
(Netherlands) GP Elite (Netherlands) Team GP Elite	31	(Netherlands) Dino van der Geest	G	6–7
(Netherlands) GP Elite (Netherlands) Team GP Elite	32	(Netherlands) Nick Ho	G	6–7
(Italy) Target Competition	28	(Italy) Aldo Festante		All
(Italy) Target Competition	29	(United Kingdom) Jack Young	R	All
(Italy) Target Competition	33	(Netherlands) Senna van Soelen	G	6–7
(Germany) Porsche Motorsport	911	(Canada) Jacques Villeneuve	G	2–7

Icon	Class
PA	Pro-Am Cup
R	Rookie
G	Guest

== Race calendar and results ==
Round	Circuit	Date	Pole position	Fastest lap	Winning driver	Winning team
1	Circuit de Monaco, Monte Carlo	7 June	(Germany) Theo Oeverhaus	(South Africa) Keagan Masters	(Germany) Theo Oeverhaus	(France) Martinet by Alméras
2	(Spain) Circuit de Barcelona-Catalunya, Montmeló	14 June	(South Africa) Keagan Masters	(Netherlands) Flynt Schuring	(Netherlands) Flynt Schuring	(France) Schumacher CLRT
3	(Austria) Red Bull Ring, Spielberg	28 June	(France) Paul Cauhaupé	(Netherlands) Robert de Haan	(Netherlands) Robert de Haan	(Austria) BWT Lechner Racing
4	(Belgium) Circuit de Spa-Francorchamps, Stavelot	19 July	(Netherlands) Flynt Schuring	(Netherlands) Flynt Schuring	(Netherlands) Flynt Schuring	(France) Schumacher CLRT
5	(Hungary) Hungaroring, Budapest	26 July	(Finland) Marcus Amand	(Finland) Marcus Amand	(Finland) Marcus Amand	(Austria) BWT Lechner Racing
6	(Netherlands) Circuit Zandvoort, Zandvoort	22 August	(Netherlands) Flynt Schuring (Note: Flynt Schuring set the fastest time in qualifying but had to serve a three-place grid penalty from an incident at the Hungaroring. Wouter Boerekamps, who set the second fastest time, started on pole position.)	(Netherlands) Wouter Boerekamps	(France) Paul Cauhaupé	(France) Martinet by Alméras
7	(Netherlands) Circuit Zandvoort, Zandvoort	23 August	(Netherlands) Jaap van Lagen	(Netherlands) Flynt Schuring	(Netherlands) Flynt Schuring	(France) Schumacher CLRT
8	(Italy) Autodromo Nazionale di Monza, Monza	6 September	(Italy) Andrea Bristot	Not recognised (Note: The fastest lap was not recognised after the race was not resumed following a red flag on lap three after multiple incidents in the opening laps.)	(Italy) Andrea Bristot	(Italy) Dinamic Motorsport

== Championship standings ==
=== Scoring system ===
Points were awarded to the top fifteen classified drivers in every race, using the following system:

Position	**1st**	**2nd**	**3rd**	**4th**	**5th**	**6th**	**7th**	**8th**	**9th**	**10th**	**11th**	**12th**	**13th**	**14th**	**15th**
Points	25	20	17	14	12	10	9	8	7	6	5	4	3	2	1

In order for full points to be awarded, the race winner must complete at least 50% of the scheduled race distance. Half points are awarded if the race winner completes less than 50% of the race distance. In the event of a tie at the conclusion of the championship, a count-back system is used as a tie-breaker, with a driver's/constructor's best result used to decide the standings.

Rookie drivers must be 25 years of age or younger to compete in the Rookies' Championship.

Guest drivers are ineligible to score points. If a guest driver finishes in first position, the second-placed finisher will receive 25 points. The same goes for every other points scoring position. So if three guest drivers end up placed fourth, fifth and sixth, the seventh-placed finisher will receive fourteen points and so forth - until the eighteenth-placed finisher receives the final point.

=== Drivers' Championship ===
Pos.	Driver	MON (Monaco)	CAT (Spain)	RBR (Austria)	SPA (Belgium)	HUN (Hungary)	ZND1 (Netherlands)	ZND2 (Netherlands)	MNZ (Note: Half points were awarded as less than 50% of the scheduled distance was completed.) (Italy)	Points
1	(Netherlands) Flynt Schuring	5	1	2	**1**	Ret	**3**	1	3	132.5
2	(Netherlands) Robert de Haan	4	Ret	1	3	5	5	3	2	107
3	(Germany) Theo Oeverhaus	**1**	3	6	6	9	6	6	8	95
4	(Luxembourg) Chester Kieffer	10	8	7	2	2	4	Ret	6	82
5	(Finland) Marcus Amand	11	4	12	4	**1**	Ret	12	4	74
6	(France) Paul Cauhaupé	16	2	**9**	5	Ret	1	19	11	67
7	(United Kingdom) Gustav Burton	3	13	4	10	7	11	7	26	66
8	(Italy) Andrea Bristot	2	10	5	13	13	15	16	**1**	64.5
9	(Netherlands) Jaap van Lagen	7	14	15	8	16	2	**2**	Ret	63
10	(Netherlands) Wouter Boerekamps	15	7	11	7	3	16	8	7	56.5
11	(Netherlands) Dirk Schouten	8	6	8	16	10	7	10	10	52.5
12	(South Africa) Keagan Masters	6	**5**	3	12	Ret	8	Ret	18	52
13	(Brazil) Matheus Ferreira	9	18	10	9	6	10	11	15	43
14	(United Kingdom) Jack Young	12	21	Ret	19	4	Ret	4	14	33.5
15	(United Kingdom) Liam McNeilly	14	Ret	13	15	8	9	9	12	32.5
16	(Australia) Caleb Sumich	13	15	14	14	12	12	Ret	13	22
17	(Italy) Aldo Festante	20	12	16	17	Ret	17	14	5	16
18	(Romania) Filip Ugran	18	16	19	21	14	Ret	13		9
19	(Germany) Jonas Greif	17	19	18	20	15	18	18	19	3
20	(Italy) William Mezzetti	21	17	17	18	18	29†	20	17	1.5
21	(Argentina) Luciano Martinez	27†	22	22	22	22	19	23	20	0
22	(Australia) Samer Shahin	23	Ret	21	Ret	20	28	24	21	0
23	(Colombia) Juan Pablo Vega Dieppa	25	23	23	23	21	21	22	25	0
24	(Germany) Kai Pfister	24	Ret	26	26	23	24	25	24	0
25	(Spain) Jorge Ramírez	26	24	25	28	24	25	Ret	23	0
Guest drivers ineligible to score points
—	(Netherlands) Senna van Soelen						13	5		–
—	(Germany) Alexander Tauscher		9	DSQ	11					–
—	(Italy) Gianmarco Quaresmini			20					9	–
—	(Finland) Jukka Honkavuori		11			11			16	–
—	(Netherlands) Nick Ho						14	17		–
—	(Netherlands) Paul de Prenter						20	15		–
—	(Italy) Eugenio Pisani	22	20		25	17				–
—	(Canada) Jacques Villeneuve		Ret	24	24	19	27	26		–
—	(Japan) Taichi Watarai	19								–
—	(Netherlands) Niels Troost						22	21		–
—	(United States) Henry Wheeler								22	–
—	(Netherlands) Dino van der Geest						23	27		–
—	(Netherlands) Michael Verhagen						26	28		–
—	(Netherlands) Bert de Heus			27						–
—	(Germany) Maik Rosenberg				27					–
—	(United States) Rodin Younessi	DNS		28						–
—	(Italy) Andrea Galli								DSQ	–
Pos.	Driver	MON (Monaco)	CAT (Spain)	RBR (Austria)	SPA (Belgium)	HUN (Hungary)	ZND1 (Netherlands)	ZND2 (Netherlands)	MNZ (Italy)	Points

Colour	Result
Gold	Winner
Silver	Second place
Bronze	Third place
Green	Points classification
Blue	Non-points classification
Blue	Non-classified finish (NC)
Purple	Retired, not classified (Ret)
Red	Did not qualify (DNQ)
Red	Did not pre-qualify (DNPQ)
Black	Disqualified (DSQ)
White	Did not start (DNS)
White	Withdrew (WD)
White	Race cancelled (C)
Blank	Did not practice (DNP)
Blank	Did not arrive (DNA)
Blank	Excluded (EX)

**Bold** – Pole
Italics – Fastest Lap

Notes

† – Driver did not finish the race, but were classified as they completed over 75% of the race distance.

=== Rookies' Championship ===
Pos.	Driver	MON (Monaco)	CAT (Spain)	RBR (Austria)	SPA (Belgium)	HUN (Hungary)	ZND1 (Netherlands)	ZND2 (Netherlands)	MNZ (Note: Half points were awarded as less than 50% of the scheduled distance was completed.) (Italy)	Points
1	(Luxembourg) Chester Kieffer	10	8	7	2	2	4	Ret	6	82
2	(France) Paul Cauhaupé	16	2	**9**	5	Ret	1	19	11	67
3	(Italy) Andrea Bristot	2	10	5	13	13	15	16	**1**	64.5
4	(Brazil) Matheus Ferreira	9	18	10	9	6	10	11	15	43
5	(United Kingdom) Jack Young	12	21	Ret	19	4	Ret	4	14	33.5
6	(United Kingdom) Liam McNeilly	14	Ret	13	15	8	9	9	12	32.5
7	(Australia) Caleb Sumich	13	15	14	14	12	12	Ret	13	22
8	(Romania) Filip Ugran	18	16	19	21	14	Ret	14		9
9	(Germany) Jonas Greif	17	19	18	20	15	18	18	19	3
10	(Italy) William Mezzetti	21	17	17	18	18	29†	20	17	1.5
11	(Argentina) Luciano Martinez	27†	22	22	22	22	19	23	20	0
Pos.	Driver	MON (Monaco)	CAT (Spain)	RBR (Austria)	SPA (Belgium)	HUN (Hungary)	ZND1 (Netherlands)	ZND2 (Netherlands)	MNZ (Italy)	Points

=== Teams' Championship ===
Only the results of nominated entries count for teams fielding more than two entries.

Pos.	Team	MON (Monaco)	CAT (Spain)	RBR (Austria)	SPA (Belgium)	HUN (Hungary)	ZND1 (Netherlands)	ZND2 (Netherlands)	MNZ (Note: Half points were awarded as less than 50% of the scheduled distance was completed.) (Italy)	Points
1	(France) Schumacher CLRT	5	1	2	1	2	3	1	3	214.5
1	(France) Schumacher CLRT	10	8	7	2	Ret	4	Ret	6	214.5
2	(France) Martinet by Alméras	1	2	6	5	9	2	2	8	185.5
2	(France) Martinet by Alméras	7	3	9	6	16	6	6	11	185.5
3	(Austria) BWT Lechner Racing	4	4	1	3	1	5	3	2	181
3	(Austria) BWT Lechner Racing	11	15	12	4	5	Ret	12	4	181
4	(Netherlands) Team GP Elite	3	13	10	9	3	10	7	7	98.5
4	(Netherlands) Team GP Elite	15	18	11	10	6	16	11	26	98.5
5	(Germany) Looping by CarTech	8	6	8	11	10	7	10	10	68
5	(Germany) Looping by CarTech	19	11	27	16	11	20	15	16	68
6	(Italy) Dinamic Motorsport	2	10	5	13	13	15	16	1	60.5
6	(Italy) Dinamic Motorsport	21	17	17	18	17	29†	20	17	60.5
7	(Germany) Proton Competition	6	5	3	12	23	8	25	18	58
7	(Germany) Proton Competition	24	9	DSQ	26	Ret	24	Ret	24	58
8	(Italy) Target Competition	12	12	16	17	4	17	4	5	47
8	(Italy) Target Competition	20	21	Ret	19	Ret	Ret	14	14	47
9	(Italy) Ombra Racing	14	16	13	15	8	9	9	12	37
9	(Italy) Ombra Racing	18	22	19	21	14	Ret	13	20	37
10	(Netherlands) GP Elite	17	19	18	20	15	18	18	19	1
10	(Netherlands) GP Elite	23	Ret	21	Ret	20	28	24	21	1
11	(Spain) RGB Racing	25	23	23	23	21	21	22	23	0
11	(Spain) RGB Racing	26	24	25	28	24	25	Ret	25	0
Pos.	Team	MON (Monaco)	CAT (Spain)	RBR (Austria)	SPA (Belgium)	HUN (Hungary)	ZND1 (Netherlands)	ZND2 (Netherlands)	MNZ (Italy)	Points
