= 2024 Porsche Supercup =

Sports car racing event

The 2024 Porsche Mobil 1 Supercup was the 32nd Porsche Supercup season, a GT3 production stock car racing series sanctioned by Porsche Motorsports GmbH in the world. It began on 19 May at Imola Circuit, Italy and ended on 1 September at the Autodromo Nazionale di Monza, Italy, after eight races, all of which were support events for the 2024 Formula One World Championship.

The championship was won by Dutch driver Larry ten Voorde for the Schumacher CLRT team. It was ten Voorde's third Supercup title and his fifth consecutive top-2 championship result. Ten Voorde finished 23 points ahead of British driver Harry King driving for the BWT Lechner Racing team and 47 points ahead of his Schmacher CLRT team mate, French driver Marvin Klein.

Rookie championship saw a narrow 3-point victory by Robert de Haan (BWT Lechner Racing) over fellow Dutchman Kas Haverkort (Universer by Team GP Elite) in a dramatic Monza Finale, which ultimately saw Haverkort’s car in the wall prior to Lesmo 1.

== Rule changes for 2024 ==
=== Technical ===
- All Porsche Supercup entrants will utilize the all-new synthetic eFuel that are potentially near-carbon-neutral produced exclusively by Esso. The all-new fuel feedstock comes from the ExxonMobil Haru Oni pilot plant in Chile.

== Teams and drivers ==
Team	No.	Drivers	Class	Rounds
(Austria) BWT Lechner Racing	1	(United Kingdom) Harry King		All
(Austria) BWT Lechner Racing	2	(Netherlands) Robert de Haan	R	All
(Austria) BWT Lechner Racing	3	(Germany) Theo Oeverhaus	R	All
(Germany) Proton Huber Competition	4	(Germany) Alexander Tauscher	R	All
(Germany) Proton Huber Competition	5	(Germany) Sebastian Freymuth	R	All
(Germany) Proton Huber Competition	6	(Norway) Roar Lindland		1–2, 4–8
(Germany) Proton Huber Competition	6	(Austria) Horst Felix Felbermayr	G	3
(Germany) Proton Huber Competition	31	(Argentina) Fabian Alberto Taraborelli	G	1
(Germany) Proton Huber Competition	38	(United Kingdom) Josh Stanton	G	4
(Germany) Proton Huber Competition	42	(Austria) Horst Felix Felbermayr	G	5
(Germany) Proton Huber Competition	43	(Netherlands) Flynt Schuring	G	6–7
(Germany) Proton Huber Competition	47	(Sweden) Daniel Ros	G	7
(Germany) Proton Huber Competition	47	(United States) Dominique Bastien	G	8
(Italy) Dinamic Motorsport SRL	7	(Italy) Aldo Festante	R	All
(Italy) Dinamic Motorsport SRL	8	(Italy) Francesco Braschi	R	1–4, 6–8
(Italy) Dinamic Motorsport SRL	8	(Netherlands) Loek Hartog	G	5
(Italy) Dinamic Motorsport SRL	9	(Netherlands) Jaap van Lagen		All
(France) Schumacher CLRT	10	(France) Marvin Klein		All
(France) Schumacher CLRT	11	(France) Alessandro Ghiretti		All
(France) Schumacher CLRT	12	(Netherlands) Larry ten Voorde		All
(France) Martinet / Forestier Racing	13	(France) Louis Rousset	R	All
(France) Martinet / Forestier Racing	14	(Spain) Fernando Monje		1–2
(France) Martinet / Forestier Racing	14	(Netherlands) Dirk Schouten	G	3
(France) Martinet / Forestier Racing	14	(United Kingdom) Michael Crees	G	4
(France) Martinet / Forestier Racing	14	(France) Marlon Hernandez	G	6
(France) Martinet / Forestier Racing	14	(Italy) Gianmarco Quaresmini	G	7–8
(France) Martinet by Alméras	16	(France) Mathys Jaubert	R	All
(France) Martinet by Alméras	17	(France) Victor Bernier	R	1–6, 8
(France) Martinet by Alméras	17	(Netherlands) Paul Meijer	G	7
(Italy) Ombra S.R.L.	18	(South Africa) Keagan Masters		All
(Italy) Ombra S.R.L.	19	(Germany) Lirim Zendeli	R	All
(Italy) Ombra S.R.L.	20	(North Macedonia) Risto Vukov		1–5, 8
(Italy) Ombra S.R.L.	20	(Netherlands) Dirk Schouten	G	6
(Italy) Ombra S.R.L.	48	(United States) Anthony Imperato	G	8
(Netherlands) GP Elite (Note: Car No. 21 and 61 entered as GP Elite, car No. 23, 24 and 25 entered as Universer by Team GP Elite and car 44, 45 and 46 entered as Team GP Elite) (Netherlands) Universer by Team GP Elite (Netherlands) Team GP Elite	21	(Germany) Sören Spreng		1–2, 7
(Netherlands) GP Elite (Netherlands) Universer by Team GP Elite (Netherlands) Team GP Elite	21	(Netherlands) Cedric Chassang	G	5–6
(Netherlands) GP Elite (Netherlands) Universer by Team GP Elite (Netherlands) Team GP Elite	21	(Netherlands) Wouter Boerekamps	G	8
(Netherlands) GP Elite (Netherlands) Universer by Team GP Elite (Netherlands) Team GP Elite	22	(Australia) Samer Shahin		All
(Netherlands) GP Elite (Netherlands) Universer by Team GP Elite (Netherlands) Team GP Elite	23	(Netherlands) Huub van Eijndhoven		All
(Netherlands) GP Elite (Netherlands) Universer by Team GP Elite (Netherlands) Team GP Elite	24	(Netherlands) Kas Haverkort	R	All
(Netherlands) GP Elite (Netherlands) Universer by Team GP Elite (Netherlands) Team GP Elite	25	(Israel) Ariel Levi	R	All
(Netherlands) GP Elite (Netherlands) Universer by Team GP Elite (Netherlands) Team GP Elite	44	(Netherlands) Niels Troost	G	7
(Netherlands) GP Elite (Netherlands) Universer by Team GP Elite (Netherlands) Team GP Elite	45	(Netherlands) Wouter Boerekamps	G	7
(Netherlands) GP Elite (Netherlands) Universer by Team GP Elite (Netherlands) Team GP Elite	46	(Netherlands) Jacques Groenewegen	G	7
(Italy) The Driving Experiences SRL	26	(Italy) Diego Bertonelli	G	1, 8
(Italy) The Driving Experiences SRL	27	(Austria) Horst Felix Felbermayr	G	1, 8
(Italy) The Driving Experiences SRL	49	(Italy) Paolo Gnemmi	G	8
(Italy) Prima Ghinzani Motorsport	28	(Italy) Giuseppe Guirreri	G	1, 8
(Italy) Prima Ghinzani Motorsport	29	(Italy) Pietro Armanni	G	1, 8
(Italy) Prima Ghinzani Motorsport	30	(Italy) Simone Iaquinta	G	1, 8
(Germany) MRS GT-Racing	32	(Brazil) Carlos Eduardo Brugnara Taurisano	G	3
(Germany) MRS GT-Racing	33	(Colombia) Juan Pablo Vega Dieppa	G	3
(Italy) SP Racing - Swiss Eagle	34	(Italy) Eugenio Pisani	G	3, 6
(Italy) SP Racing - Swiss Eagle	35	(Switzerland) Giorgio Maggi	G	3, 6
(United Kingdom) JTR	36	(United Kingdom) James Wallis	G	4
(United Kingdom) JTR	37	(United Kingdom) Ollie Jackson	G	4
(United Kingdom) Century Motorsport	39	(United Kingdom) Angus Whiteside	G	4
(United Kingdom) Century Motorsport	40	(United Kingdom) Gustav Burton	G	4
(United Kingdom) Century Motorsport	41	(United Kingdom) George Gamble	G	4
(Germany) Dr. Ing. h.c. F. Porsche AG	911	(Germany) Timo Glock	G	3

Icon	Class
PA	Pro-Am Cup
R	Rookie
G	Guest

== Race calendar and results ==
Round	Circuit	Date	Pole position	Fastest lap	Winning driver	Winning team
1	(Italy) Imola Circuit, Imola	17–19 May	(Netherlands) Larry ten Voorde	(Netherlands) Larry ten Voorde	(Netherlands) Larry ten Voorde	(France) Schumacher CLRT
2	Circuit de Monaco, Monte Carlo	24–26 May	(Netherlands) Larry ten Voorde	(Netherlands) Larry ten Voorde	(Netherlands) Larry ten Voorde	(France) Schumacher CLRT
3	(Austria) Red Bull Ring, Spielberg	28–30 June	(France) Marvin Klein	(France) Marvin Klein	(Netherlands) Larry ten Voorde	(France) Schumacher CLRT
4	(United Kingdom) Silverstone Circuit, Silverstone	5–7 July	(Netherlands) Larry ten Voorde	(Netherlands) Larry ten Voorde	(Netherlands) Larry ten Voorde	(France) Schumacher CLRT
5	(Hungary) Hungaroring, Budapest	19–21 July	(United Kingdom) Harry King	(France) Marvin Klein	(United Kingdom) Harry King	(Austria) BWT Lechner Racing
6	(Belgium) Circuit de Spa-Francorchamps, Stavelot	26–28 July	(France) Marvin Klein	(France) Marvin Klein	(France) Marvin Klein	(France) Schumacher CLRT
7	(Netherlands) Circuit Zandvoort, Zandvoort	23–25 August	(Netherlands) Larry ten Voorde	(Netherlands) Larry ten Voorde	(Netherlands) Larry ten Voorde	(France) Schumacher CLRT
8	(Italy) Autodromo Nazionale di Monza, Monza	30 August—1 September	(Netherlands) Robert de Haan	(Netherlands) Robert de Haan	(France) Alessandro Ghiretti	(France) Schumacher CLRT

== Championship standings ==
=== Scoring system ===
Points were awarded to the top fifteen classified drivers in every race, using the following system:

Position	**1st**	**2nd**	**3rd**	**4th**	**5th**	**6th**	**7th**	**8th**	**9th**	**10th**	**11th**	**12th**	**13th**	**14th**	**15th**	**Ref**
Points	25	20	17	14	12	10	9	8	7	6	5	4	3	2	1	

In order for full points to be awarded, the race winner must complete at least 50% of the scheduled race distance. Half points are awarded if the race winner completes less than 50% of the race distance. In the event of a tie at the conclusion of the championship, a count-back system is used as a tie-breaker, with a driver's/constructor's best result used to decide the standings.

Guest drivers are ineligible to score points. If a guest driver finishes in first position, the second-placed finisher will receive 25 points. The same goes for every other points scoring position. So if three guest drivers end up placed fourth, fifth and sixth, the seventh-placed finisher will receive fourteen points and so forth - until the eighteenth-placed finisher receives the final point.

=== Drivers' Championship ===
Pos.	Driver	IMO (Italy)	MON (Monaco)	AUT (Austria)	GBR (United Kingdom)	HUN (Hungary)	SPA (Belgium)	ZND (Netherlands)	MNZ (Italy)	Points
1	(Netherlands) Larry ten Voorde	**1**	**1**	1	**1**	7	4	**1**	2	168
2	(United Kingdom) Harry King	2	2	2	4	**1**	3	5	3	145
3	(France) Marvin Klein	3	5	**3**	2	2	**1**	26†	6	121
4	(South Africa) Keagan Masters	8	3	4	6	5	6	13	4	90
5	(France) Alessandro Ghiretti	Ret	8	6	5	6	5	9	1	85
6	(Netherlands) Huub van Eijndhoven	7	7	12	29†	4	2	3	5	85
7	(Netherlands) Robert de Haan	4	9	10	3	16	7	4	**7**	76
8	(Netherlands) Kas Haverkort	6	4	5	7	3	18	6	29†	73
9	(Netherlands) Jaap van Lagen	12	6	9	9	12	9	2	25	60
10	(France) Mathys Jaubert	Ret	10	8	10	8	Ret	7	15	41
11	(Germany) Theo Oeverhaus	5	12	7	11	17	17	18	13	38
12	(Germany) Lirim Zendeli	17	11	15	8	11	13	12	11	38
13	(Israel) Ariel Levi	9	15	Ret	12	13	8	21	Ret	24
14	(Germany) Alexander Tauscher	Ret	13	Ret	18	10	15	11	17	24
15	(Italy) Francesco Braschi	16	16	11	26		16	Ret	10	16
16	(France) Louis Rousset	15	Ret	14	14	19	11	20	16	16
17	(Italy) Aldo Festante	10	19	13	22	Ret	21	16	Ret	13
18	(Germany) Sebastian Freymuth	14	17	Ret	21	14	10	17	28†	12
19	(France) Victor Bernier	11	14	24†	17	15	19		26	11
20	(North Macedonia) Risto Vukov	18	18	17	25	18			12	6
21	(Australia) Samer Shahin	23	23†	16	28	Ret	Ret	23	19	1
22	(Norway) Roar Lindland	24	20		24	21	20	19	21	1
23	(Spain) Fernando Monje	20	21							0
24	(Germany) Sören Spreng	25	22					24		0
Guest drivers ineligible for points
-	(Netherlands) Wouter Boerekamps							10	8	-
-	(Netherlands) Flynt Schuring						Ret	8		-
-	(Italy) Gianmarco Quaresmini							15	9	-
-	(Netherlands) Loek Hartog					9				-
-	(Netherlands) Dirk Schouten			Ret			12			-
-	(Italy) Diego Bertonelli	13							20	-
-	(United Kingdom) Gustav Burton				13					-
-	(France) Marlon Hernandez						14			-
-	(Sweden) Daniel Ros							14		-
-	(Italy) Pietro Armanni	19							14	-
-	(United Kingdom) Angus Whiteside				15					-
-	(United Kingdom) George Gamble				16					-
-	(Austria) Horst Felix Felbermayr	21		21		20			18	-
-	(Germany) Timo Glock			18						-
-	(Switzerland) Giorgio Maggi			19			22			-
-	(United Kingdom) James Wallis				19					-
-	(Brazil) Carlos Eduardo Brugnara Taurisano			20						-
-	(United Kingdom) Josh Stanton				20					-
-	(Italy) Giuseppe Guirreri	22							23	-
-	(Italy) Eugenio Pisani			22			23†			-
-	(Netherlands) Cedric Chassang					22	Ret			-
-	(Italy) Paolo Gnemmi								22	-
-	(Colombia) Juan Pablo Vega Dieppa			23						-
-	(United Kingdom) Ollie Jackson				23					-
-	(Netherlands) Paul Meijer							24		-
-	(United States) Dominique Bastien								24	-
-	(Netherlands) Jacques Groenewegen							25		-
-	(United Kingdom) Michael Crees				27					-
-	(United States) Anthony Imperato								27	-
-	(Italy) Simone Iaquinta	Ret							Ret	-
-	(Netherlands) Niels Troost							Ret		-
-	(Argentina) Fabian Alberto Taraborelli	DNQ								-
Pos.	Driver	IMO (Italy)	MON (Monaco)	AUT (Austria)	GBR (United Kingdom)	HUN (Hungary)	SPA (Belgium)	ZND (Netherlands)	MNZ (Italy)	Points

Colour	Result
Gold	Winner
Silver	Second place
Bronze	Third place
Green	Points classification
Blue	Non-points classification
Blue	Non-classified finish (NC)
Purple	Retired, not classified (Ret)
Red	Did not qualify (DNQ)
Red	Did not pre-qualify (DNPQ)
Black	Disqualified (DSQ)
White	Did not start (DNS)
White	Withdrew (WD)
White	Race cancelled (C)
Blank	Did not practice (DNP)
Blank	Did not arrive (DNA)
Blank	Excluded (EX)

**Bold** – Pole
Italics – Fastest Lap

Notes

† – Driver did not finish the race, but were classified as they completed over 75% of the race distance.

=== Rookie Championship ===
Pos.	Driver	IMO (Italy)	MON (Monaco)	AUT (Austria)	GBR (United Kingdom)	HUN (Hungary)	SPA (Belgium)	ZND (Netherlands)	MNZ (Italy)	Points
1	(Netherlands) Robert de Haan	4	9	10	3	16	7	3	**7**	76
2	(Netherlands) Kas Haverkort	6	4	5	7	3	18	6	29†	73
3	(France) Mathys Jaubert	Ret	10	8	10	8	Ret	7	16	40
4	(Germany) Theo Oeverhaus	5	12	7	11	17	17	18	13	38
5	(Germany) Lirim Zendeli	17	11	15	8	11	13	12	11	36
6	(Israel) Ariel Levi	9	15	Ret	12	13	8	21	Ret	24
7	(Germany) Alexander Tauscher	Ret	13	Ret	18	10	15	11	17	23
8	(Germany) Sebastian Freymuth	14	17	Ret	21	14	10	17	28†	17
9	(France) Louis Rousset	15	Ret	14	14	19	11	20	14	16
10	(Italy) Francesco Braschi	16	16	11	26		16	Ret	10	15
11	(Italy) Aldo Festante	10	19	13	22	Ret	21	16	Ret	13
12	(France) Victor Bernier	11	14	24†	17	15	19		26	11
Pos.	Driver	IMO (Italy)	MON (Monaco)	AUT (Austria)	GBR (United Kingdom)	HUN (Hungary)	SPA (Belgium)	ZND (Netherlands)	MNZ (Italy)	Points

=== Teams' Championship ===
Pos.	Team	Points
1	(France) Schumacher CLRT	272
2	(Austria) BWT Lechner Racing	221
3	(Netherlands) Uniserver by Team GP Elite	147
4	(Italy) Ombra Racing	125
5	(Italy) Dinamic Motorsport	82
6	(France) Martinet by Alméras	49
7	(France) Martinet / Forestier Racing	29
8	(Germany) Proton Huber Competition	29
9	(Netherlands) GP Elite	8
Pos.	Team	Points
