= Andrea Bristot =

Italian racing driver (born 2001)

- Bristot competing in the 2026 Porsche Supercup round at Circuit Zandvoort
- Nationality: (Italy) Italian
- Born: 23 May 2001 (age 25) Belluno, Italy

Porsche Supercup career
- Debut season: 2026
- Current team: Dinamic Motorsport
- Categorisation: FIA Silver
- Car number: 7
- Starts: 8
- Wins: 1
- Podiums: 2
- Poles: 1
- Fastest laps: 0
- Best finish: 8th in 2026

Previous series
- 2025 2024: Mitjet Italian Series; MINI Challenge Italy – Evo

Championship titles
- 2026 2026 2025 2024: Porsche Carrera Cup Italy; Porsche Carrera Cup Italy – Rookie; Mitjet Italian Series; MINI Challenge Italy – Evo

Andrea Bristot (born 23 May 2001) is an Italian racing driver and sim racer who last competed for Dinamic Motorsport in Porsche Supercup and Porsche Carrera Cup Italy.

== Racing career ==
Bristot began karting in 2012, competing until 2018. Alongside a brief spell in the Karting Academy Trophy in 2014, Bristot primarily raced in the Championkart Trophy between 2014 and 2015, securing the Academy and Super Academy titles respectively. In 2017, Bristot moved up to senior karts, and most notably finished second in the X30 Senior class of the Andrea Margutti Trophy. In 2018, Bristot won the Autumn Trophy, as well as IAME Series Italy's X30 Senior title, earning him an invitation to the IAME International Final. At the end of the year, Bristot left motorsport to focus on his studies.

Following a six-year break from motorsport, Bristot joined Della Pia Engineering to enter MINI Challenge Italy in 2024, winning six races and scoring two other podiums to clinch the Evo title. Stepping up to the Mitjet Italian Series for 2025, Bristot clinched his second consecutive title in car racing with six wins to his name. In 2026, Bristot joined Dinamic Motorsport on a two-year contract for a dual campaign in Porsche Supercup and Porsche Carrera Cup Italy. In the former, Bristot finished second to Theo Oeverhaus on debut at Monaco, before securing his only win of the season in a red-flagged finale at Monza from pole to take eighth in the overall standings. In the latter, Bristot took third in both Imola races, before elevating himself to the lead of the standings by dominating the Misano and Monza rounds. Following a double pole at Vallelunga, before winning three of the last four races en route to the overall and rookie titles. Towards the end of the year, Bristot partook in the European Le Mans Series rookie tests, sampling LMGT3 machinery with Ferrari-affiliated Kessel Racing.

== Esports career ==
During his sabbatical from real-life racing, Bristot took on professional sim racing. Mainly competing on iRacing, Bristot most notably won the ACI eSport GT championship in 2024, before clinching the F4, GT3 and GT4 titles in ACI-sanctioned series.

== Karting record ==
=== Karting career summary ===
Season	Series	Team	Position
2014	Karting Academy Trophy	Stefano Bristot	13th
2015	Italian Karting Championship — KF-J		8th
2016	Italian Karting Championship — OK-J		14th
2017	Andrea Margutti Trophy — X30 Senior	Stefano Bristot	2nd
2018	Andrea Margutti Trophy — X30 Senior	Stefano Bristot	11th
2018	IAME International Final — X30 Senior	Team Driver ASD	NC

== Racing record ==
=== Racing career summary ===
Season	Series	Team	Races	Wins	Poles	F/Laps	Podiums	Points	Position
2024	MINI Challenge Italy – Evo	Della Pia Engineering	10	6	7	10	8	195	**1st**
2025	Mitjet Italian Series	Costa Ovest	10	6	3	10	8		**1st**
2025	ATCC Cup								
2026	Porsche Carrera Cup Italy	Dinamic Motorsport	12	3	9	6	9	256	**1st**
2026	Porsche Supercup	Dinamic Motorsport	8	1	1	0	2	64.5	8th

=== Complete Porsche Carrera Cup Italy results ===
(key) (Races in bold indicate pole position; races in italics indicate fastest lap)

Year	Team	1	2	3	4	5	6	7	8	9	10	11	12	Pos.	Points
2026	Dinamic Motorsport	IMO; 1; 3	IMO; 2; 3	**MIS1**; **1**; 1	**MIS1**; **2**; 1	**MNZ**; **1**; 1	**MNZ**; **2**; 1	**VAL**; **1**; 24	**VAL**; **2**; 5	**MIS2**; **1**; 1	**MIS2**; **2**; 4	MUG; 1; 1	**MUG**; **2**; 1	1st	256

=== Complete Porsche Supercup results ===
(key) (Races in bold indicate pole position; races in italics indicate fastest lap)

Year	Team	1	2	3	4	5	6	7	8	Pos.	Points
2026	Dinamic Motorsport	MON; 2	CAT; 10	RBR; 5	SPA; 13	HUN; 13	ZAN; 15	ZAN; 16	**MNZ**; 1	8th	64.5
