= Robert de Haan =

Dutch racing driver (born 2006)

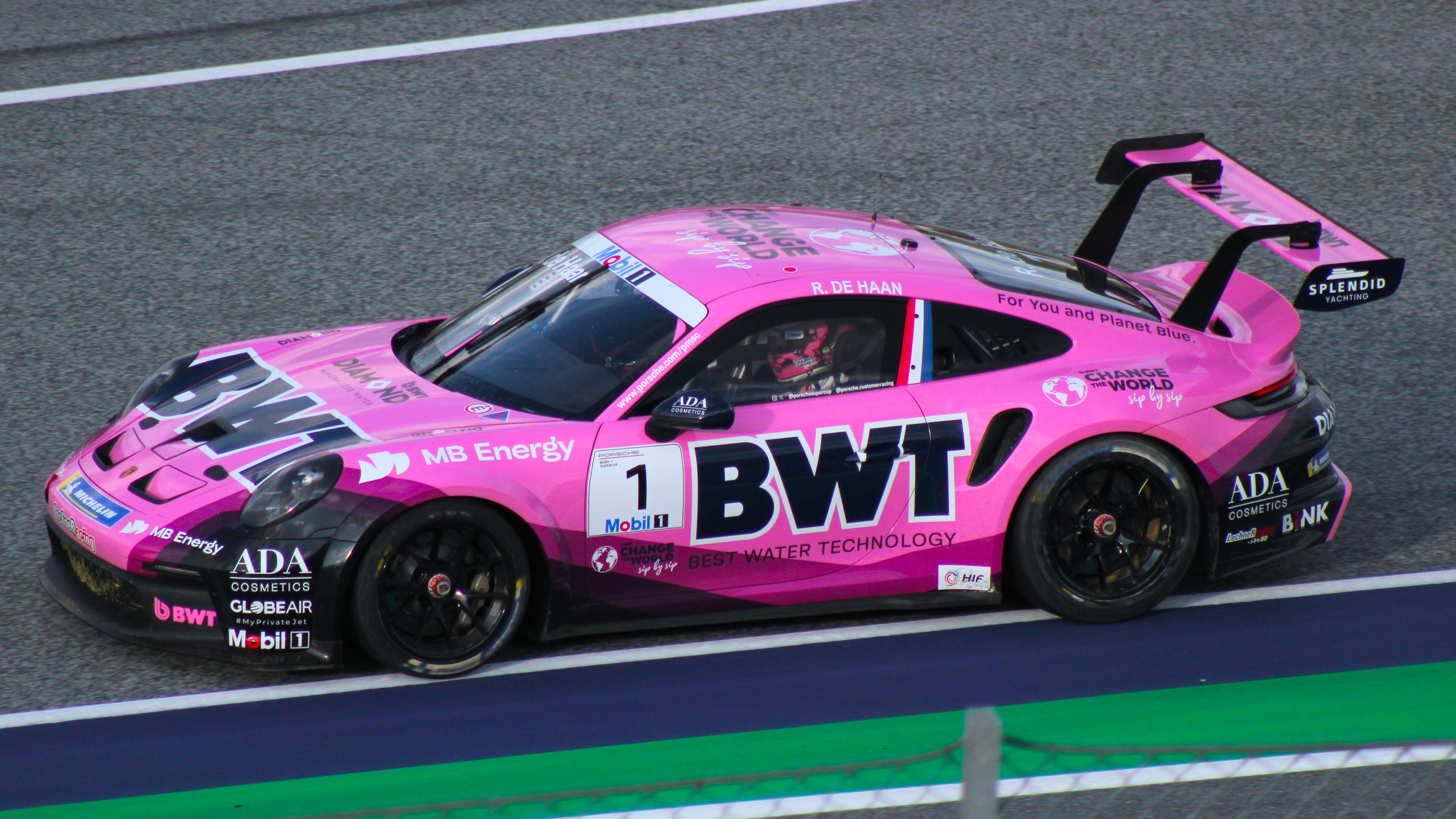
- De Haan at the Red Bull Ring in 2025
- Nationality: (Netherlands) Dutch
- Born: 22 June 2006 (age 20) Eerbeek, Gelderland, The Netherlands

Porsche Supercup career
- Debut season: 2024
- Current team: Lechner Racing
- Categorisation: FIA Silver (until 2025); FIA Gold (2026–)
- Car number: 1
- Starts: 11
- Wins: 1
- Podiums: 6
- Poles: 3
- Fastest laps: 3
- Best finish: 2nd in 2025

Previous series
- 2022 2021 2021 2021: Formula 4 UAE Championship; ADAC Formula 4 Italian F4 Championship; Ginetta Junior Championship

Championship titles
- 2023 2023: Porsche Carrera Cup Benelux; Porsche Sprint Challenge Southern Europe

Awards
- 2021 2021: FEED Racing France Shootout Winner; Ginetta Junior Scholarship Winner

Robert de Haan (born 22 June 2006) is a Dutch racing driver currently competing in the Porsche Carrera Cup Deutschland and Porsche Mobil 1 Supercup with Lechner Racing and Team 75 Bernhard. He made his racing debut in the 2021 Ginetta Junior Championship after winning the Ginetta Junior Scholarship, and he also won the 2021 FEED Racing France Shootout.

== Career ==
=== Karting ===
In 2018, de Haan became Junior champion at the Rotax Max Challenge Grand Finals. In 2019, he won the German Junior Kart Championship.

=== Ginetta Junior Championship ===
In December 2020, de Haan won the Ginetta Junior Scholarship, following a test in the Ginetta G40 at Blyton Park, to compete in the full 2021 Ginetta Junior Championship. He contested the season with Richardson Racing, taking three overall wins throughout the season. He finished the season fourth in the drivers' championship and as the highest place rookie.

=== Formula 4 ===
In 2021, de Haan also won the FEED Racing shootout, which utilizes the Mygale M14-F4 car and is organised by Jacques Villeneuve and Patrick Lemarié. At the end of the year, de Haan joined Van Amersfoort Racing to contest the season finales of the Italian F4 Championship and ADAC Formula 4 Championship. In the latter, he even took a rookie win in the second race at the Nürburgring.

In 2022, de Haan joined Pinnacle Motorsport in the Formula 4 UAE Championship from the third round onwards. He then joined Monlau Motorsport to compete in the F4 Spanish Championship. He finished the season in tenth and took a single podium at Circuit de Spa-Francorchamps.

=== Porsche competition ===
In 2023, de Haan rejoined Richardson Racing to compete in the Porsche Carrera Cup Great Britain and Porsche Carrera Cup Benelux. Ahead of the main season, he already won the Porsche Sprint Challenge Southern Europe with the team. In the Porsche Carrera Cup GB, he took three wins, becoming the youngest overall race winner in the history of the Porsche Carrera Cup GB and finished sixth in the championship. In the Porsche Carrera Cup, Benelux he became the overall and rookie champion. He also joined Richardson Racing as guest driver in the Silverstone race of the Porsche Supercup, in which he claimed second place. De Haan also joined HRT Performance to compete in the Zandvoort round of the Porsche Carrera Cup Germany, in which he took a podium.

In 2024, de Haan made the step up to a full time seat with BWT Lechner Racing in the Porsche Supercup alongside duties in Carrera Cup Deutschland with Team 75 Bernhard. Many victories, poles and podiums were seen over the year. De Haan provided some one on one duels throughout the year and got to many of the more experienced drivers in both series. Some of these moments were his battle with Ghiretti in Monaco for the second round of the Supercup. His heat battle with Larry ten Voorde in the Nurburgring in the closing stages of the race post FCY intervention was one for the books.

== Karting record ==
=== Karting career summary ===
Season	Series	Team	Position
2016	Rotax Max Challenge Grand Finals - Micro Max		2nd
2016	BNL International Karting Series - Micro		6th
2017	Rotax Max Challenge Grand Finals - Mini Max	GCW de Haan	5th
2018	CIK-FIA Karting Academy Trophy		12th
2018	Rotax Max Challenge Euro Trophy - Junior		6th
2018	Rotax Max Challenge Grand Finals - Junior	Cees de Haan	1st
2019	WSK Final Cup — OKJ	Energy Corse	6th
2019	WSK Open Cup — OKJ	Energy Corse	7th
2019	Italian Karting Championship — OKJ		9th
2019	IAME International Final - X30 Junior		2nd
2019	SKUSA SuperNationals XXIII - X30 Junior		4th
2019	German Junior Kart Championship	Energy Corse	1st
2019	FIA Karting European Championship - OKJ	Energy Corse	15th
2019	FIA Karting World Championship - OKJ	Energy Corse	7th
2019	WSK Euro Series — OKJ	Energy Corse	8th
2019	WSK Champions Cup — OKJ	Energy Corse	20th
2019	FIA Karting Academy Trophy		3rd
2019	WSK Super Master Series - OKJ	Energy Corse	13th
2019	24° South Garda Winter Cup — OKJ	Energy Corse	11th
2020	WSK Euro Series — OK		41st
2020	FIA European Championship — OK	Energy Corse	22nd
2020	25° South Garda Winter Cup — OK	Energy Corse	4th
2020	WSK Super Master Series — OK	Energy Corse	19th
2020	WSK Champions Cup — OKJ	Energy Corse	31st

== Racing record ==
=== Racing career summary ===
Season	Series	Team	Races	Wins	Poles	F/Laps	Podiums	Points	Position
2021	Ginetta Junior Championship	Richardson Racing	25	3	0	5	9	507	4th
2021	ADAC Formula 4 Championship	Van Amersfoort Racing	3	0	0	0	0	24	14th
2021	Italian F4 Championship	Van Amersfoort Racing	3	0	0	0	0	0	39th
2022	Formula 4 UAE Championship	Pinnacle Motorsport	12	0	0	0	0	0	30th
2022	F4 Spanish Championship	Monlau Motorsport	21	0	0	0	1	61	10th
2023	Porsche Sprint Challenge Southern Europe - Sport Division - Pro	Richardson Racing	6	4	5	4	5	130	**1st**
2023	Porsche Carrera Cup Benelux	Richardson Racing	12	6	4	4	11	256	**1st**
2023	Porsche Supercup	Richardson Racing	1	0	0	0	1	0	NC†
2023	Porsche Carrera Cup Great Britain - Pro	Richardson Racing	12	3	3	3	5	38	7th
2023	Porsche Carrera Cup Germany	HRT Performance	2	0	0	0	1	29	18th
2023–24	Porsche Carrera Cup Middle East	Central Europe Racing	6	2	2	3	6	127	4th
2024	Porsche Supercup	BWT Lechner Racing	8	0	1	0	1	76	7th
2024	Porsche Carrera Cup Germany	TEAM 75 Bernhard	16	1	2	3	8	160	5th
2024	Porsche Carrera Cup Italy	Target Competition	2	1	1	1	1	28	16th
2024–25	Porsche Carrera Cup Middle East	BWT Junior Racing	2	2	2	2	2	50	14th
2025	Porsche Carrera Cup Germany	Proton Huber Competition	16	6	4	5	11	269	**1st**
2025	Porsche Supercup	BWT Lechner Racing	8	1	2	2	5	115.5	**2nd**
2025	Porsche Carrera Cup Italy	Target Competition	2	0	0	1	1	21	21st
2025	Porsche Carrera Cup Australia - Pro	EMA Motorsport	1	0	1	0	0	0	NC†
2025	Nürburgring Langstrecken-Serie - AT3	Four Motors Bionconcept-Car							
2025–26	24H Series Middle East - 992	Tierra Outdoor Racing by Fach Auto Tech							
2025–26	Porsche Carrera Cup Middle East	Seven x Seven Racing	2	2	2	2	2	50	8th
2026	Porsche Carrera Cup Japan	Seven x Seven Racing	7	7	7	7	7	162.5	4th
2026	GT World Challenge Europe Endurance Cup	Paradine Competition	3	0	0	0	0	0	NC
2026	24H Series - GT3	Proton Competition	1	0	0	0	0	28	31st
2026	Porsche Carrera Cup Germany	Proton Competition	6	1	1	2	2	60	14th
2026	Porsche Supercup	BWT Lechner Racing	8	1	0	1	4	107	**2nd**
2026–27	Asian Le Mans Series - GT3	Proton Competition							

^{*} Season still in progress.

=== Complete Ginetta Junior Championship results ===
(key) (Races in bold indicate pole position) (Races in italics indicate fastest lap)

Year	Team	1	2	3	4	5	6	7	8	9	10	11	12	13	14	15	16	17	18	19	20	21	22	23	24	25	26	DC	Points
2021	Richardson Racing	THR1; 1; 9	THR1; 2; 4	SNE; 1; 10	SNE; 2; 8	SNE; 3 Ret	BHI; 1; 8	BHI; 2; 7	BHI; 3; 5	OUL; 1 Ret	OUL; 2 C	KNO; 1; 4	KNO; 2; 4	KNO; 3; 8	KNO; 4; 3	THR2; 1; 1	THR2; 2; 6	THR2; 3; 1	SIL; 1; 1	SIL; 2; 3	SIL; 3; 2	DON; 1; 4	DON; 2; 3	DON; 3; 5	BHGP; 1; 2	BHGP; 2; 10	BHGP; 3; 2	4th	507

=== Complete Formula 4 UAE Championship results ===
(key) (Races in bold indicate pole position) (Races in italics indicate fastest lap)

Year	Team	1	2	3	4	5	6	7	8	9	10	11	12	13	14	15	16	17	18	19	20	DC	Points
2022	Pinnacle Motorsport	YAS1; 1	YAS1; 2	YAS1; 3	YAS1; 4	DUB1; 1	DUB1; 2	DUB1; 3	DUB1; 4	DUB2; 1; 15	DUB2; 2; 16	DUB2; 3; 22	DUB2; 4; 21	DUB3; 1; 19	DUB3; 2; 16	DUB3; 3; 23	DUB3; 4; 20	YAS2; 1; 13	YAS2; 2 Ret	YAS2; 3; 12	YAS2; 4; 26	30th	0

=== Complete F4 Spanish Championship results ===
(key) (Races in bold indicate pole position) (Races in italics indicate fastest lap)

Year	Team	1	2	3	4	5	6	7	8	9	10	11	12	13	14	15	16	17	18	19	20	21	DC	Points
2022	Monlau Motorsport	ALG; 1; 11	ALG; 2; 6	ALG; 3 Ret	JER; 1; 7	JER; 2; 10	JER; 3; 10	CRT; 1; 9	CRT; 2; 10	CRT; 3; 14	SPA; 1; 6	SPA; 2; 6	SPA; 3; 3	ARA; 1; 4	ARA; 2 Ret	ARA; 3; 8	NAV; 1; 9	NAV; 2; 11	NAV; 3 Ret	CAT; 1; 12	CAT; 2; 9	CAT; 3; 29	10th	61

=== Complete Porsche Carrera Cup Germany results ===
(key) (Races in bold indicate pole position) (Races in italics indicate fastest lap)

Year	Team	1	2	3	4	5	6	7	8	9	10	11	12	13	14	15	16	DC	Points
2023	HRT Performance	SPA; 1	SPA; 2	HOC1; 1	HOC1; 2	ZAN; 1; 4	ZAN; 2; 3	NÜR; 1	NÜR; 2	LAU; 1	LAU; 2	SAC; 1	SAC; 2	RBR; 1	RBR; 2	HOC2; 1	HOC2; 2	18th	29
2024	TEAM 75 Bernhard	IMO; 1; 3	IMO; 2; 14	**OSC**; **1**; 1	**OSC**; **2** Ret	ZAN; 1 Ret	ZAN; 2; 2	HUN; 1; 3	HUN; 2; 3	NÜR; 1; 3	NÜR; 2; 3	SAC; 1; 15	SAC; 2; 8	RBR; 1; 16	RBR; 2; 8	HOC; 1; 3	HOC; 2; 18	5th	160
2025	Proton Huber Competition	**IMO**; **1**; 1	**IMO**; **2**; 1	SPA; 1; 9	SPA; 2; 3	ZAN; 1; 2	ZAN; 2; 12	NOR; 1; 3	NOR; 2; 1	NÜR; 1; 3	NÜR; 2; 11	SAC; 1; 5	**SAC**; **2**; 23	**RBR**; **1**; 1	RBR; 2; 2	HOC; 1; 1	HOC; 2; 1	1st	269

^{*}Season still in progress.

=== Complete Porsche Supercup results ===
(key) (Races in bold indicate pole position) (Races in italics indicate fastest lap)

Year	Team	1	2	3	4	5	6	7	8	Pos.	Points
2023	Richardson Racing	MON	RBR	SIL; 2	HUN	SPA	ZND	ZND	MNZ	NC†	0
2024	BWT Lechner Racing	IMO; 4	MON; 9	RBR; 10	SIL; 3	HUN; 18	SPA; 7	ZND; 4	**MNZ**; 7	7th	76
2025	BWT Lechner Racing	IMO; Ret	**MON**; 1‡	CAT; 2	**RBR**; 2	SPA; 3	HUN; 5	ZND; 2	MNZ; 4	2nd	115.5
2026	BWT Lechner Racing	MON; 4	CAT; Ret	RBR; 1	SPA; 3	HUN; 5	ZND; 5	ZND; 3	MNZ; 2‡	2nd	107

^{†}As de Haan was a guest driver, he was ineligible for points.
^{‡} Half points awarded as less than 75% of race distance was completed.
^{*} Season still in progress.

=== Complete GT World Challenge Europe results ===
==== GT World Challenge Europe Endurance Cup ====
(key) (Races in bold indicate pole position) (Races in italics indicate fastest lap)

Year	Team	Car	Class	1	2	3	4	5	6	7	Pos.	Points
2026	Paradine Competition	BMW M4 GT3 Evo	Gold	LEC; 24							19th	12
2026	Paradine Competition	BMW M4 GT3 Evo	Bronze		MNZ; 26	SPA; 6H	SPA; 12H	SPA; 24H	NÜR	**ALG**; 31	17th	23
