= Keagan Masters =

South African racing driver (born 2000)

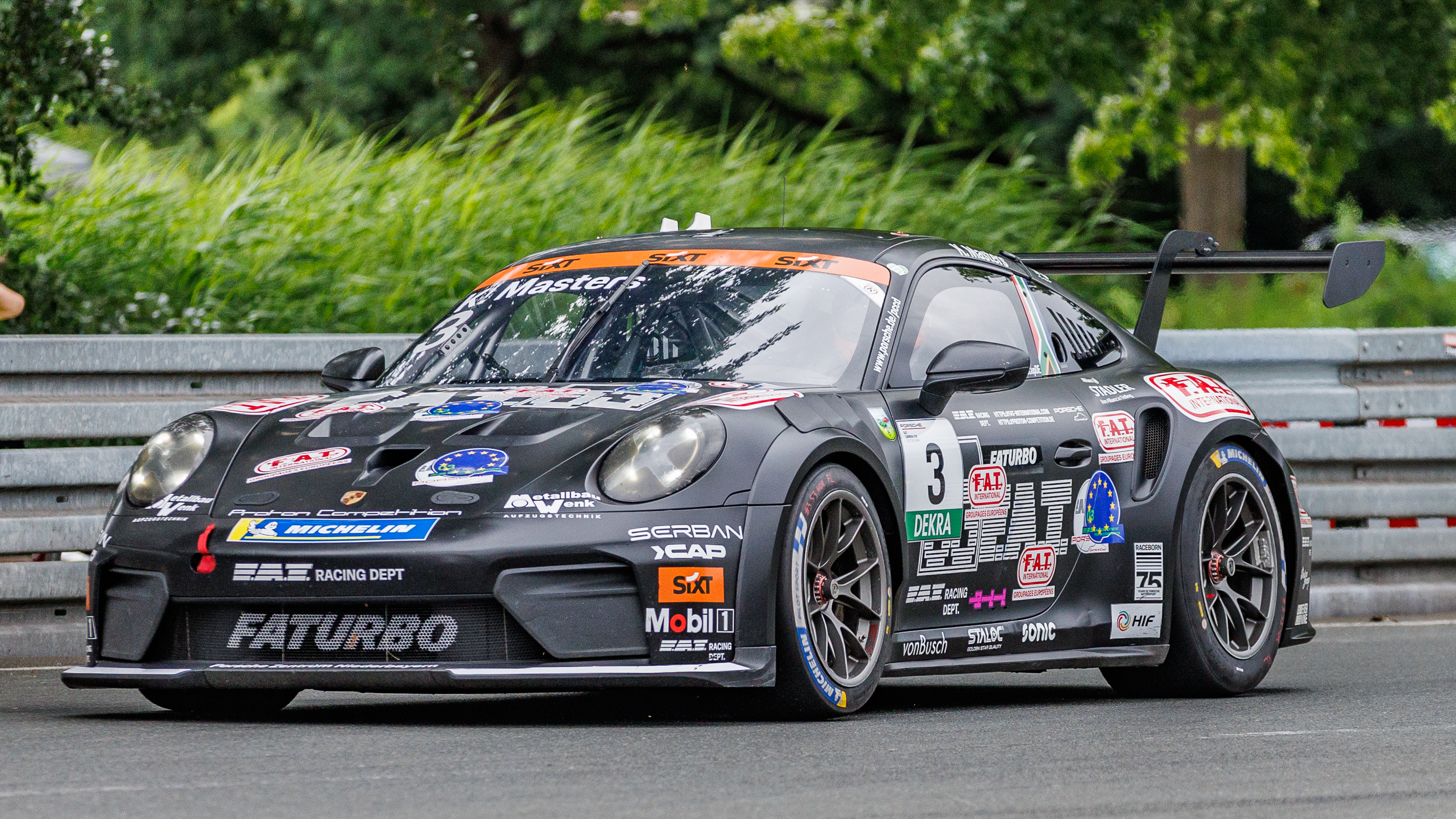
- Masters at Norisring in 2026
- Nationality: South African
- Born: 2 March 2000 (age 26) Hartbeespoort, South Africa

Global Touring Car Championship - GTC career
- Debut season: 2019
- Current team: Volkswagen Motorsport
- Categorisation: FIA Silver (until 2024); FIA Gold (2025–)
- Car number: 18
- Starts: 16
- Wins: 2
- Poles: 1
- Fastest laps: 0
- Best finish: 1st in 2019

Championship titles
- 2019 2017, 2018: Sasol GTC Championship (GTC); Sasol GTC Championship (GTC2)

Keagan Masters (born 2 March 2000) is a South African racing driver who currently competes in the Porsche Supercup. He has taken three championship titles in the series, two in the GTC2 Class (2017, 2018) and one in the GTC Class (2019).

== Racing record ==
=== Career summary ===
Season	Series	Team	Races	Wins	Poles	F/Laps	Podiums	Points	Position
2017	Audi Sport TT Cup	Audi Sport	11	2	1	1	4	148	7th
2018	Global Touring Car Championship - GTC2	Volkswagen Motorsport	18	11	?	?	15	386	**1st**
2019	Global Touring Car Championship - GTC	Volkswagen Motorsport	12	2	?	?	11	308	**1st**
2022	Global Touring Car Championship - GTC Supacup	Perfect Circle Racing	10	2	1	1	4	98	5th
2022	Porsche Carrera Cup Italy	AB Racing	12	2	1	4	3	170	**2nd**
2023	Global Touring Car Championship - GTC Supacup	Nathan Hammond Racing	2	0	0	0	0	16	11th
2023	Porsche Carrera Cup Benelux	Ombra Racing	2	0	1	0	1	0	NC†
2023	Porsche Supercup	Ombra Racing	8	0	0	0	0	45	10th
2023	Porsche Carrera Cup Italy	Ombra Racing	4	1	1	0	3	67	11th
2024	Porsche Supercup	Ombra Racing	8	0	0	0	1	88	4th
2024	Porsche Carrera Cup Italy	Team Q8 Hi-Perform	12	1	1	2	8	206	**1st**
2025	Porsche Carrera Cup France	TFT Racing	8	0	0	1	1	99	8th
2025	Porsche Carrera Cup Italy	Team Q8 Hi-Perform	12	3	7	7	8	212	**1st**
2025	Porsche Supercup	Ombra Racing	8	0	0	0	0	38	12th
2025	Porsche Carrera Cup Germany	Proton Huber Competition	2	0	0	1	1	27	18th
2026	Porsche Carrera Cup Germany	Proton Competition	16	2	0	1	8	230	**1st**
2026	Porsche Supercup	Proton Competition	8	0	1	1	1	52	12th

=== Complete Porsche Carrera Cup Italy result ===
(key) (Races in bold indicate pole position) (Races in italics indicate fastest lap)

Year	Team	1	2	3	4	5	6	7	8	9	10	11	12	DC	Points
2022	AB Racing	IMO; 1; 7	IMO; 2; 8	MIS; 1; 6	MIS; 2; 14	MUG1; 1; 10	MUG1; 2; 5	VLL; 1; 5	VLL; 2; 3	MNZ; 1; 4	MNZ; 2; 1	**MUG2**; **1**; 1	**MUG2**; **2**; 10	2nd	170
2023	Ombra Racing	MIS1; 1	MIS1; 2	VLL; 1	VLL; 2	MUG; 1	MUG; 2	**MNZ**; **1** Ret	MNZ; 2; 2	MIS2; 1; 1	MIS2; 2; 2	IMO; 1	IMO; 2	11th	67
2024	Team Q8 Hi-Perform	MIS; 1; 2	MIS; 2; 1	IMO1; 1; 2	IMO1; 2; 2	MUG; 1; 5	MUG; 2; 7	IMO2; 1; 2	IMO2; 2; 3	VLL; 1; 5	VLL; 2; 6	MNZ; 1; 2	**MNZ**; **2**; 3	1st	206

^{*}Season still in progress.

=== Complete Porsche Supercup results ===
(key) (Races in bold indicate pole position) (Races in italics indicate fastest lap)

Year	Team	1	2	3	4	5	6	7	8	Pos.	Points
2023	Ombra Racing	MON; Ret	RBR; 18	SIL; 4	HUN; 12	SPA; 22	ZND; 9	ZND; 9	MNZ; 9	10th	45
2024	Ombra S.R.L.	IMO; 8	MON; 3	RBR; 4	SIL; 6	HUN; 5	SPA; 6	ZND; 13	MNZ; 4	4th	90
2025	Ombra S.R.L.	IMO; 4	MON; Ret	CAT; 15	RBR; 8	SPA; 16	HUN; 19†	ZAN; 14	MNZ; 9	12th	38

^{*} Season still in progress.

=== Complete Porsche Carrera Cup France results ===
(key) (Races in bold indicate pole position) (Races in italics indicate fastest lap)

Year	Team	1	2	3	4	5	6	7	8	9	10	11	12	Pos	Points
2025	TFT Racing	CAT; 1; 4	CAT; 2; 8	DIJ; 1; 6	DIJ; 2; 7	SPA; 1	SPA; 2	MIS; 1	MIS; 2	VAL; 1	VAL; 2	LEC; 1	LEC; 2	7th*	41*

^{*}Season still in progress.
