= Eugenio Pisani =

Italian auto racing driver from Ravenna (born 1991)

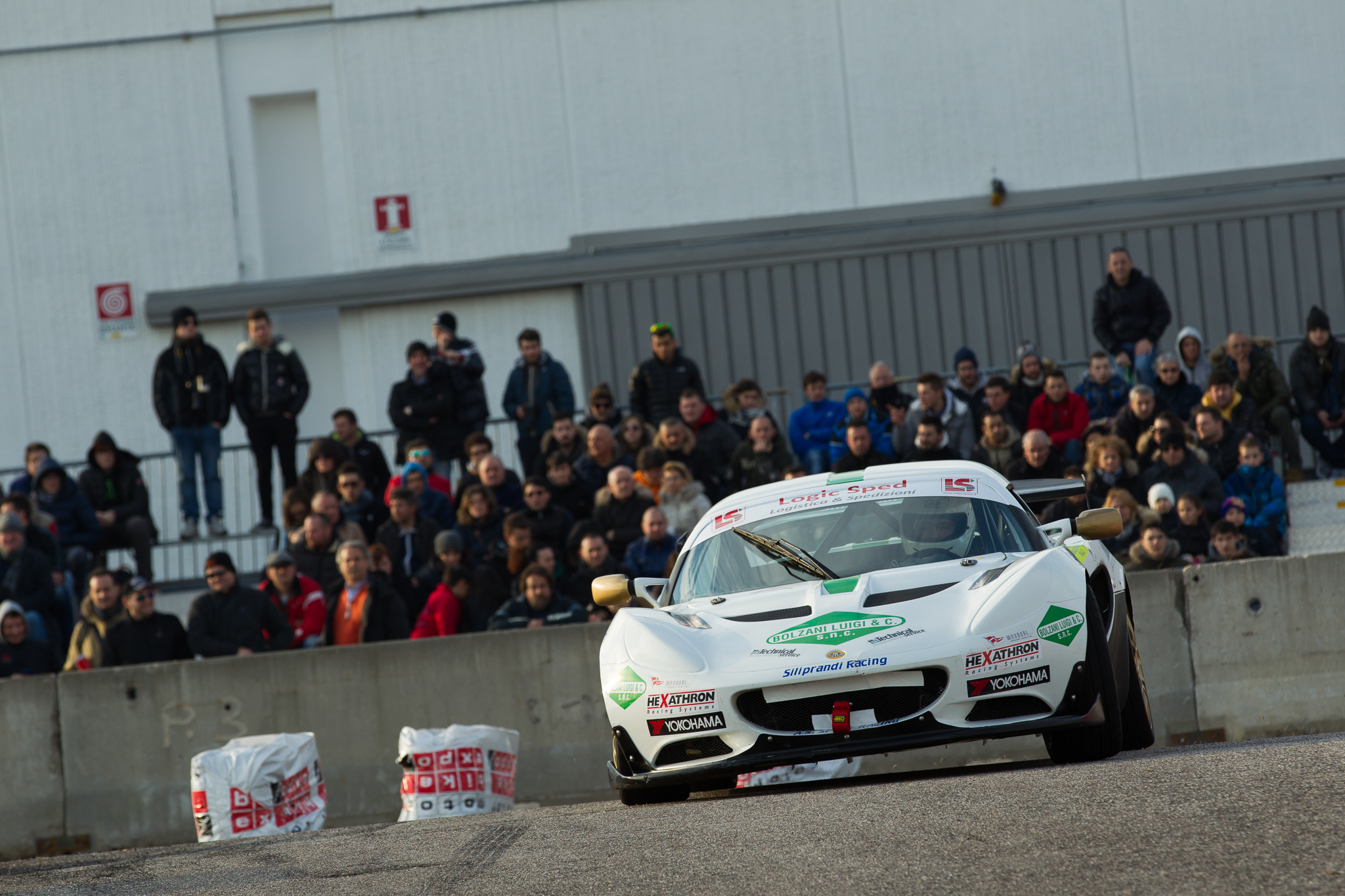
Pisani racing in the 2015 Lotus Cup Italia

Eugenio Pisani (born 7 December 1991, in Santa Margherita Ligure) is an Italian auto racing driver from Ravenna.

From 2006, Pisani competed in the Italian Karting Championship. In his first year, he finished the championship third and in the following year in fifth place. Pisani began racing cars (Italian Championship) in 2014 with his teammate Fabio Fabiani (who won the 2011 WTCC Jay-Ten Trophy) in a Seat Leon Supercopa Long-Run. In his first season, he ended third in the Italian Seat Leon Supercopa Trophy and fifth in the "Coppa Italia".

In 2015, Pisani raced in the Lotus Cup Italy, ending fourth overall with two podiums (second-third) and two fourth places over six races.

In 2016, Pisani competed in the TCR Italian Series with a Seat Leon TCR by BF Motorsport and in the Italian Prototype Championship with a Norma M20F - Honda 2000 (CN2 Class) for Siliprandi Racing. winning the Under 25 Italian Prototype Championship and ending fifth overall.

In 2017, Pisani won the Italian GT Cup Championship on board his Porsche 997 GT3 Cup.

In 2018, Pisani still competed in the Italian GT Cup Championship with Vincenzo Sauto, sharing the Porsche 997 GT3 Cup of Siliprandi Racing Team.

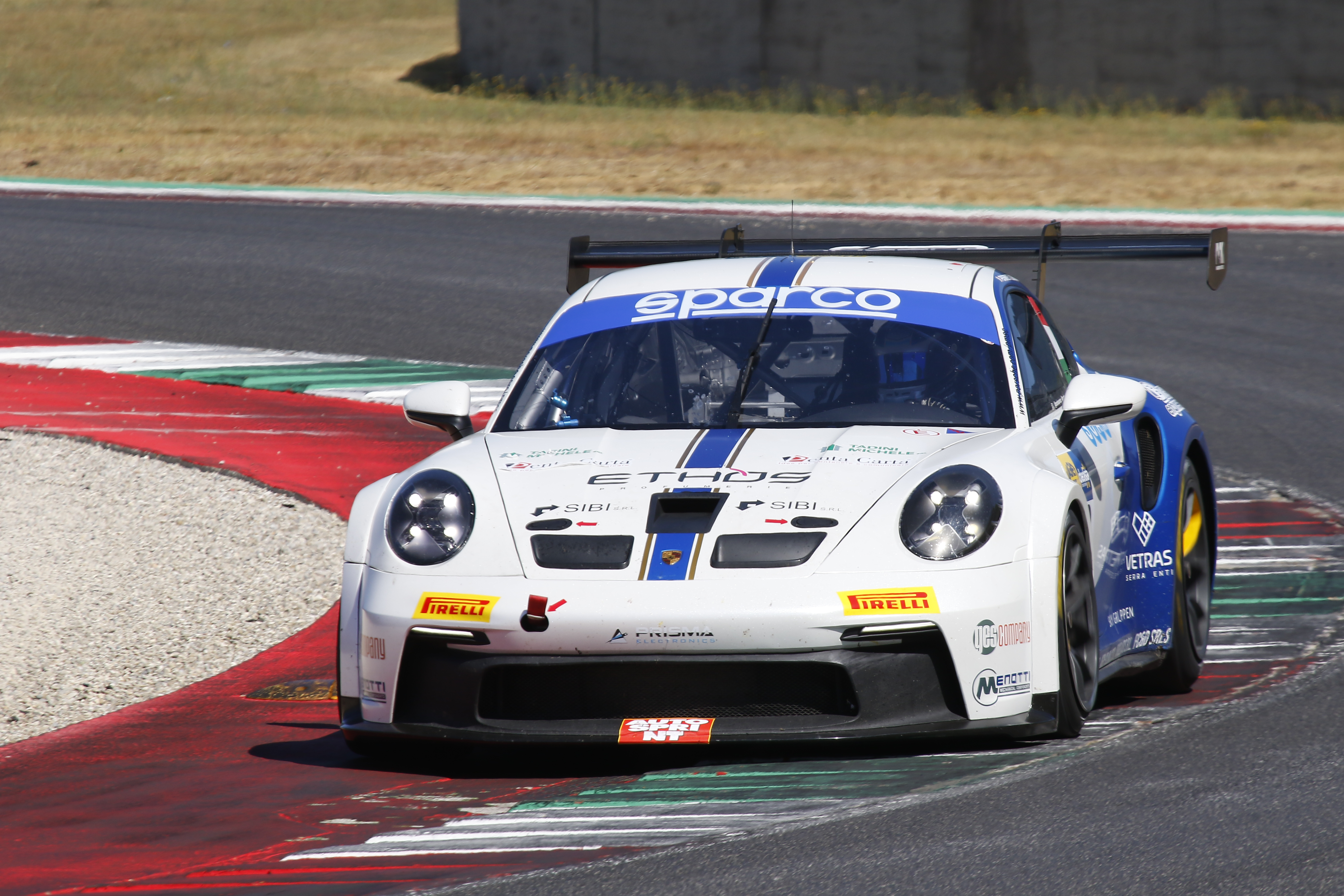
Pisani at the Mugello Circuit

In 2019, Pisani competed in the GT Cup Open Europe driving the Porsche 991 GT3 Cup of Duell Racing Team based in Limena (Padua). He shared the car with Michele Merendino, Mark Speakerwas and Stefano Bozzoni. With Stefano Bozzoni, he would participate in the 2021 GT Cup Open Europe, driving the Porsche 991 GT3 Cup of Came Racing Team, followed by Sport Racing ASD.

In 2021, with Bozzoni, Pisani attended GT Cup Open Europe with Came Racing Team (SP Racing), ending eighth overall and sixth in Pro-Am Class with a Porsche 991 GT3 Cup.

In 2022, Pisani remained with Porsche in GT Cup Open Europe with Stefano Zanini.

In 2023, Pisani raced with a Porsche 991 on the Italian Trophy and GT Cup Open Europe.

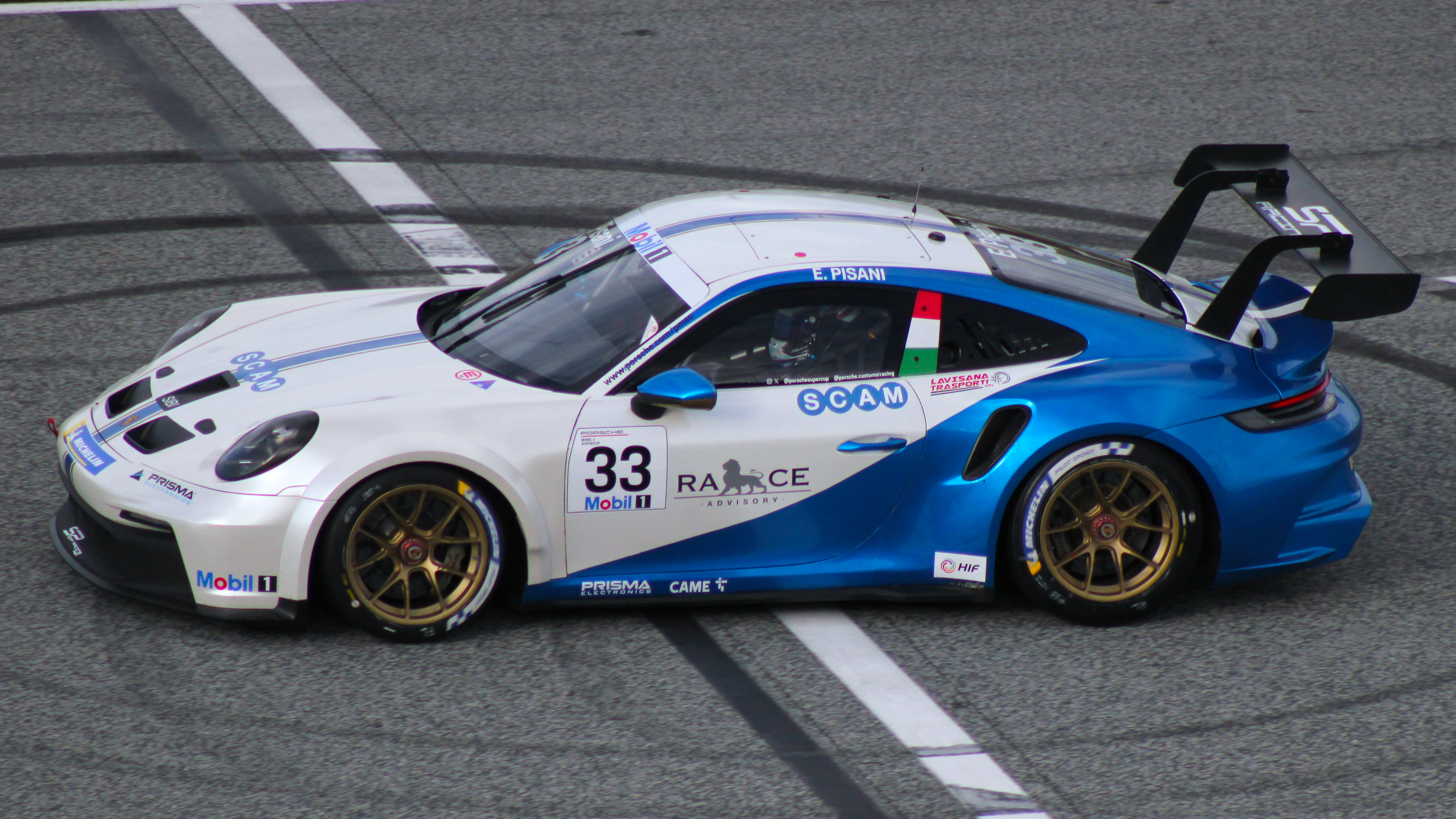
Pisani at the Red Bull Ring in 2025

In 2024, Pisani raced full-time on the Italian GT3 cup trophy organized by ACI Racing with the newly acquired Porsche 992 GT3 Cup, with the same car made his debut in the Porsche Mobil 1 Supercup series during the third round in Spielberg, Austria.

For 2026 season, Pisani raced almost full time in the Porsche Mobil 1 Supercup with Dinamic Motorsport as a teammate of Andrea Bristot with the Porsche 992.2 Cup #9.

Pisani then made guest appearances in GT2 European Series with his own team SP Racing and in GT Cup Open Europe, finishing third in Pro-Am during Monza Circuit event.
