= Dinamic Motorsport =

Auto racing team

(Italy) Dinamic Motorsport
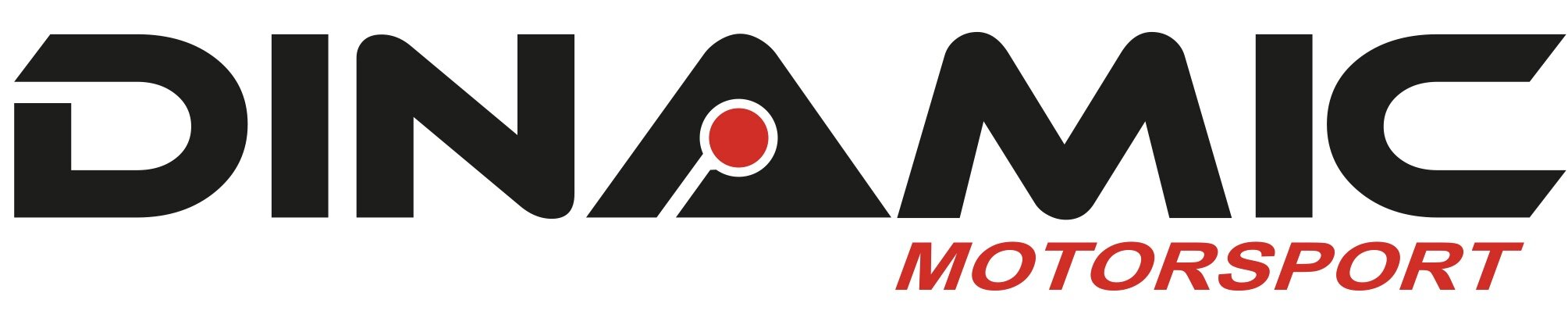
- Current series: Porsche Supercup; Porsche Carrera Cup Italia; GT World Challenge Europe Endurance Cup; GT World Challenge Europe Sprint Cup; 24H Series; ADAC GT Masters; International GT Open
- Current drivers: (Austria) Klaus Bachler (Italy) Matteo Cairoli (France) Côme Ledogar (Switzerland) Mauro Calamia (Norway) Marius Nakken (Italy) Giorgio Roda (Belgium) Adrien de Leener (Germany) Christian Engelhart (Italy) Daniele Cazzaniga (Austria) Philipp Sager (Italy) Simone Iaquinta (Netherlands) Dirk Schouten
- Website: http://www.dinamicmotorsport.com/

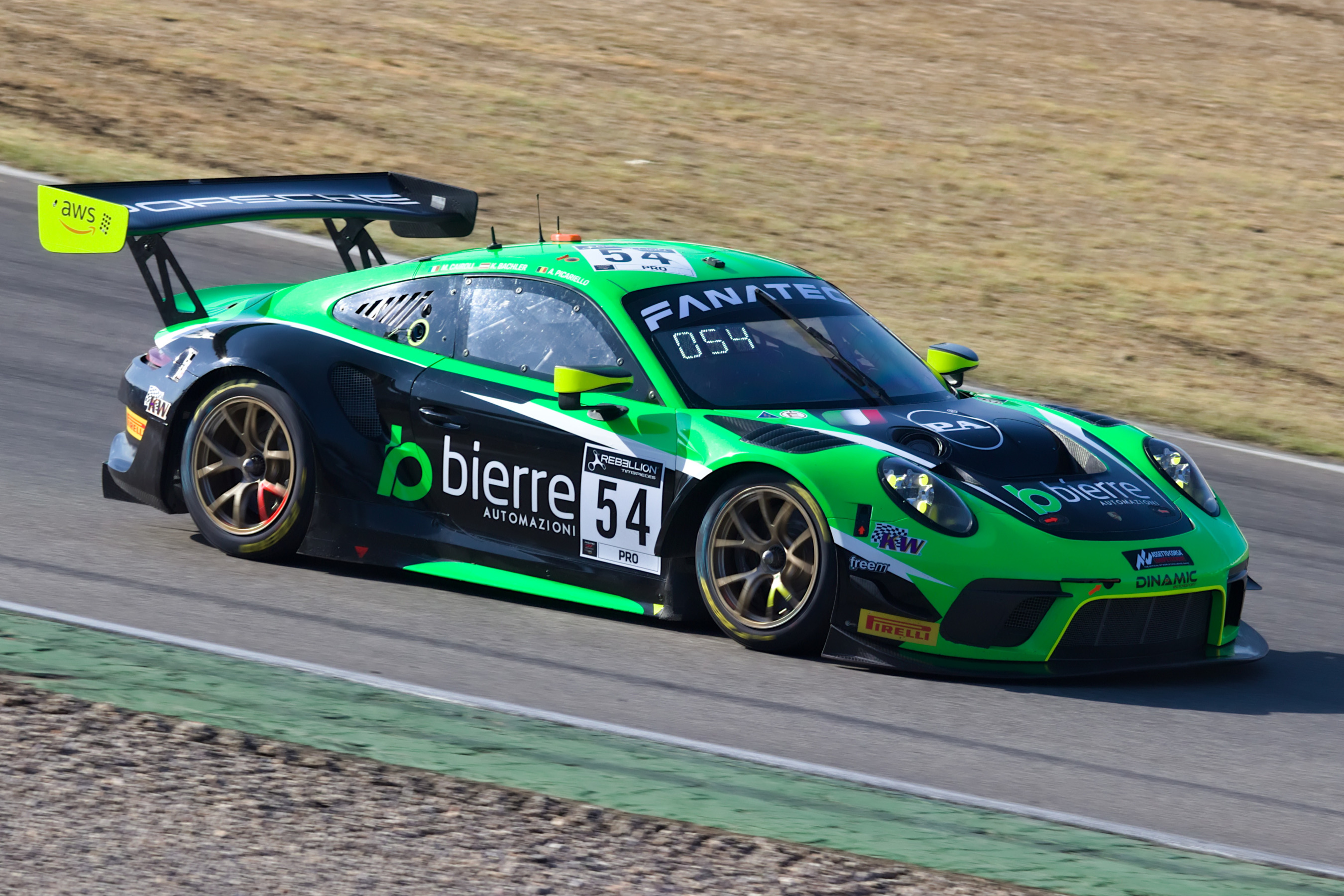
Dinamic Motorsport Porsche 911 GT3 R at the Hockenheimring.

Dinamic Motorsport is an Italian auto racing team based in Reggio Emilia, Italy. It is a Porsche reference team which participates in several sports car series globally. In 2026, the team made a debut entry with a Maserati MC20 GT2 entry in the Creventic 24H Series.

== History ==
Dinamic Motorsport was created from a joint venture between Maurizio Lusuardi and Giuliano Bottazzi, following success in Italy via Porsche Carrera Cup Italia and Porsche Supercup.

In 2019, the team made its debut in GT World Challenge Europe as a Porsche reference team and won the 3 Hours of Monza while fielding a Porsche 911 GT3 R. In 2020, Dinamic Motorsport won the 6 Hours of Nürburgring and took third place at the 24 Hours of Spa.

== Racing results ==
=== Porsche Supercup ===
Year	Entrant	No.	Drivers	1	2	3	4	5	6	7	8	9	10	Pts	Pos.
2019				CAT (Spain)	MON (Monaco)	RBR (Austria)	SIL (United Kingdom)	HOC‡ (Germany)	HUN (Hungary)	SPA (Belgium)	MNZ (Italy)	MEX (Mexico)			
2019	(Italy) Dinamic Motorsport	10	(Denmark) Mikkel O. Pedersen	6	2	6	7	Ret	16	10	4	Ret	6	80	8
2019	(Italy) Dinamic Motorsport	11	(Italy) Gianmarco Quaresmini	9	19	14	17	15	7	16	16	9	15	33	13
2019	(Italy) Dinamic Motorsport	12	(Austria) Philipp Sager	21	16	24	25	22	22	26	23	16	21	1	24
2019	(Italy) Dinamic Motorsport	44	(Italy) Alberto Cerqui								Ret			0	-
2020				RBR (Austria)		HUN (Hungary)	SIL (United Kingdom)		CAT (Spain)	SPA (Belgium)	MNZ (Italy)				
2020	(Italy) Dinamic Motorsport	10	(Norway) Marius Nakken	6	2	6	7	Ret	16	10	4			80	12
2020	(Italy) Dinamic Motorsport	11	(Austria) Moritz Sager	16	19	14	20	Ret						4	17
2020	(Italy) Dinamic Motorsport	11	(United States) Jaden Conwright						18	11	Ret			0	-
2020	(Italy) Dinamic Motorsport	12	(Austria) Philipp Sager	18	21	Ret	22	20	21	21	Ret			0	21
2020	(Italy) Dinamic Motorsport	40	(Italy) Gianmarco Quaresmini								11			0	-
2021				MON (Monaco)	RBR (Austria)		HUN (Hungary)	SPA (Belgium)	ZND (Netherlands)	MNZ (Italy)					
2021	(Italy) Dinamic Motorsport	14	(Italy) Lodovico Laurini	13	15	Ret	19							5	19
2021	(Italy) Dinamic Motorsport	14	(Netherlands) Jaap van Lagen						8					0	-
2021	(Italy) Dinamic Motorsport	14	(Italy) Alessandro Giardelli				10			22	20			0	-
2021	(Italy) Dinamic Motorsport	14	(Austria) Moritz Sager					16						0	-
2021	(Italy) Dinamic Motorsport	34	(Austria) Moritz Sager		16	16	17							0	-
2021	(Italy) Dinamic Motorsport	15	(Austria) Philipp Sager	19	18	22	25	26	29	29	25			0	24
2021	(Italy) Dinamic Motorsport	16	(Italy) Simone Iaquinta	7	11	Ret		20	3	8	10			46	12
2021	(Italy) Dinamic Motorsport	16	(Italy) Alessandro Giardelli				10			22	20			0	-
2021	(Italy) Dinamic Motorsport	37	(Italy) Gianmarco Quaresmini							16	15			0	-
2022				IMO (Italy)	MON (Monaco)	GBR (United Kingdom)	AUT (Austria)	LEC (France)	SPA (Belgium)	ZND (Netherlands)	MNZ (Italy)				
2022	(Italy) Dinamic Motorsport	14	(Italy) Daniele Cazzaniga	26	23	28	19	24	28	21	17			0	22
2022	(Italy) Dinamic Motorsport	15	(Austria) Philipp Sager	29	24	27	22	29	26	29	26			0	27
2022	(Italy) Dinamic Motorsport	16	(Italy) Simone Iaquinta	24	8	21	5	9	8	12	20			39	10
2023				MON (Monaco)	AUT (Austria)	GBR (United Kingdom)	HUN (Hungary)	SPA (Belgium)	ZND (Netherlands)		MNZ (Italy)				
2023	(Italy) Dinamic GT	14	(Netherlands) Jaap van Lagen	10	9	5	21	14	13	13	12			44	11
2023	(Italy) Dinamic GT	15	(Italy) Giorgio Amati	8	14	14	Ret	18	15	23	7			26	14
2023	(Italy) Dinamic GT	16	(Italy) Gianmarco Quaresmini	11	25		Ret	11	21	19	22			11	19
2023	(Italy) Dinamic GT	16	(United Kingdom) Angus Whiteside			Ret								-	-
2023	(Italy) Dinamic GT	36	(Italy) Aldo Festante		20									-	-
2024				IMO (Italy)	MON (Monaco)	AUT (Austria)	GBR (United Kingdom)	HUN (Hungary)	SPA (Belgium)	ZND (Netherlands)	MNZ (Italy)				
2024	(Italy) Dinamic Motorsport SRL	7	(Italy) Aldo Festante	10	19	13	22	Ret	21	16	Ret			13	17
2024	(Italy) Dinamic Motorsport SRL	8	(Italy) Francesco Braschi	16	16	11	26		16	Ret	10			16	15
2024	(Italy) Dinamic Motorsport SRL	8	(Netherlands) Loek Hartog					9						-	-
2024	(Italy) Dinamic Motorsport SRL	9	(Netherlands) Jaap van Lagen	12	6	9	9	12	9	2	25			60	9
2025				IMO (Italy)	MON (Monaco)	CAT (Spain)	RBR (Austria)	SPA (Belgium)	HUN (Hungary)	ZND (Netherlands)	MNZ (Italy)				
2025	(Italy) Dinamic Motorsport SRL	7	(Italy) Aldo Festante	Ret			14	19	11	19	14			12	19
2025	(Italy) Dinamic Motorsport SRL	7	(Italy) Gianmarco Quaresmini		Ret	18								-	-
2025	(Italy) Dinamic Motorsport SRL	8	(Netherlands) Dirk Schouten	11	6	13	13	17	12	Ret	13			25	15
2025	(Italy) Dinamic Motorsport SRL	9	(Italy) Pietro Delli Guanti	10	12	Ret	19	18	13					11	20
2025	(Italy) Dinamic Motorsport SRL	9	(Italy) Filippo Fant								Ret			-	-
2025	(Italy) Dinamic Motorsport SRL	33	(Italy) Eugenio Pisani								Ret			-	-

‡ No points were awarded at the Hockenheimring round as less than 50% of the scheduled race distance was completed.

=== Complete GT World Challenge Europe results ===
==== GT World Challenge Europe Endurance Cup ====
===== Drivers' Championship =====
Year	Pos.	Driver	No.	1	2	3	4	5	6	7	Points
2019				MNZ (Italy)	SIL (United Kingdom)	LEC (France)	SPA (Belgium)			CAT (Spain)	
2019				MNZ (Italy)	SIL (United Kingdom)	LEC (France)	6hrs	12hrs	24hrs	CAT (Spain)	
2019	8	(Kuwait) Zaid Ashkanani (Italy) Andrea Rizzoli	54	1	18	37	18	4	27	Ret	31
2019	8	(Austria) Klaus Bachler	54	1	18	37	18	4	27		31
2019	-	(Germany) Marco Seefried	54							Ret	-
