= 2021 Italian F4 Championship =

The 2021 Italian F4 Championship Powered by Abarth was the eighth season of the Italian F4 Championship.

== Teams and drivers ==
Team	No.	Driver	Class	Rounds
(Italy) Prema Powerteam	2	(Austria) Charlie Wurz	R	3, 5
(Italy) Prema Powerteam	5	(France) Macéo Capietto	R	4, 7
(Italy) Prema Powerteam	6	(Colombia) Sebastián Montoya		All
(Italy) Prema Powerteam	7	(Russia) Kirill Smal		All
(Italy) Prema Powerteam	20	(Denmark) Conrad Laursen	R	All
(Italy) Prema Powerteam	88	(United Arab Emirates) Hamda Al Qubaisi	W	All
(Italy) Prema Powerteam	99	(Italy) Andrea Kimi Antonelli	R	5–7
(Germany) US Racing	8	(United Kingdom) Luke Browning		1
(Germany) US Racing	69	(Russia) Vladislav Lomko		1, 3, 7
(Germany) US Racing	70	(Germany) Tim Tramnitz		1, 3, 5–7
(Germany) US Racing	77	(Portugal) Pedro Perino	R	5–7
(Germany) BWT Mücke Motorsport	10	(Paraguay) Joshua Dürksen		All
(Germany) BWT Mücke Motorsport	23	(Mexico) Erick Zúñiga		All
(Germany) BWT Mücke Motorsport	41	(Germany) Jonas Ried	R	All
(San Marino) AKM Motorsport	11	(Hungary) Levente Révész	R	All
(San Marino) AKM Motorsport	12	(Italy) Lorenzo Patrese	R	All
(Netherlands) Van Amersfoort Racing	13	(Austria) Joshua Dufek (Note: Dufek is an Austrian-Swiss driver who entered under the Austrian flag.)		All
(Netherlands) Van Amersfoort Racing	15	(Russia) Nikita Bedrin	R	All
(Netherlands) Van Amersfoort Racing	18	(China) Cenyu Han		1–5
(Netherlands) Van Amersfoort Racing	46	(Netherlands) Robert de Haan		7
(Netherlands) Van Amersfoort Racing	86	(Hungary) Bence Válint		All
(Netherlands) Van Amersfoort Racing	87	(United Kingdom) Oliver Bearman		All
(Italy) BVM Racing	17	(Italy) Leonardo Bizzotto	R	All
(Italy) BVM Racing	19	(United Kingdom) Oliver Gray	R	6–7
(Italy) BVM Racing	52	(Switzerland) Eron Rexhepi	R	1–5
(Italy) BVM Racing	84	(Italy) Francesco Simonazzi		1, 5–7
(Italy) Cram Motorsport	22	(Italy) Vittorio Catino	R	1, 3–4
(Italy) Cram Motorsport	33	(Italy) Rocco Mazzola	R	7
(Italy) Cram Motorsport	34	(Australia) Marcos Flack	R	7
(Italy) Cram Motorsport	35	(Colombia) Nicolás Baptiste	R	All
(Italy) Cram Motorsport	36	(Morocco) Suleiman Zanfari		1
(Italy) Cram Motorsport	79	(Greece) Georgis Markogiannis	R	1, 3–5, 7
(Switzerland) Jenzer Motorsport	24	(Poland) Piotr Wiśnicki		All
(Switzerland) Jenzer Motorsport	25	(Switzerland) Samir Ben	R	All
(Switzerland) Jenzer Motorsport	27	(Mexico) Jorge Garcíarce		All
(Switzerland) Jenzer Motorsport	28	(Italy) Francesco Braschi	R	All
(Switzerland) Jenzer Motorsport	68	(Mexico) Santiago Ramos		1–2, 4–7
(Slovenia) AS Motorsport	37	(Poland) Kacper Sztuka	R	1–5, 7
(Italy) Iron Lynx	37	(Poland) Kacper Sztuka	R	6
(Italy) Iron Lynx	72	(Italy) Leonardo Fornaroli		All
(Italy) Iron Lynx	73	(Italy) Pietro Armanni	R	All
(Italy) Iron Lynx	83	(Spain) Maya Weug (Note: Weug is a Dutch-Belgian-Spanish driver who competed under a Spanish licence.)	R W	All
(France) R-ace GP	54	(France) Marcus Amand	R	1–2
(France) R-ace GP	55	(France) Victor Bernier		1–2
(France) R-ace GP	56	(France) Sami Meguetounif		1–2
(Portugal) DR Formula RP Motorsport	77	(Portugal) Pedro Perino	R	1–4

Icon	Legend
R	Rookie
W	Woman Trophy

== Race calendar and results ==
The calendar was revealed on 10 December 2020. Later on, the third round was postponed by one week.

Round		Circuit	Date	Pole position	Fastest lap	Winning driver	Winning team	Secondary class winner	Supporting
1	R1	(France) Circuit Paul Ricard	15 May	(Russia) Kirill Smal	(Russia) Kirill Smal	(Russia) Kirill Smal	(Italy) Prema Powerteam	R: (Denmark) Conrad Laursen; W: (Spain) Maya Weug	International GT Open; Euroformula Open; GT Cup Open Europe; Porsche Carrera Cup France
1	R2	(France) Circuit Paul Ricard	16 May	(United Kingdom) Oliver Bearman	(Russia) Kirill Smal	(Germany) Tim Tramnitz	(Germany) US Racing	R: (Italy) Lorenzo Patrese; W: (Spain) Maya Weug	International GT Open; Euroformula Open; GT Cup Open Europe; Porsche Carrera Cup France
1	R3	(France) Circuit Paul Ricard	16 May	(Germany) Tim Tramnitz	(United Kingdom) Luke Browning	(Germany) Tim Tramnitz	(Germany) US Racing	R: (Germany) Jonas Ried; W: (Spain) Maya Weug	International GT Open; Euroformula Open; GT Cup Open Europe; Porsche Carrera Cup France
2	R1	(Italy) Misano World Circuit	5 June	(Italy) Leonardo Fornaroli (Note: Kirill Smal set the fastest lap in Q1 but was penalized with a drop of two positions. Leonardo Fornaroli was promoted to the pole position.)	(Germany) Jonas Ried	(Italy) Leonardo Fornaroli	(Italy) Iron Lynx	R: (Germany) Jonas Ried; W: (United Arab Emirates) Hamda Al Qubaisi	Italian GT Championship; TCR Italy Touring Car Championship; Porsche Carrera Cup Italia; Clio Cup Europe; Italian Prototype Championship; Mini Challenge Italy
2	R2	(Italy) Misano World Circuit	5 June	(United Kingdom) Oliver Bearman	(Colombia) Sebastián Montoya	(United Kingdom) Oliver Bearman	(Netherlands) Van Amersfoort Racing	R: (Italy) Leonardo Bizzotto; W: (United Arab Emirates) Hamda Al Qubaisi	Italian GT Championship; TCR Italy Touring Car Championship; Porsche Carrera Cup Italia; Clio Cup Europe; Italian Prototype Championship; Mini Challenge Italy
2	R3	(Italy) Misano World Circuit	6 June	(United Kingdom) Oliver Bearman	(Austria) Joshua Dufek	(United Kingdom) Oliver Bearman	(Netherlands) Van Amersfoort Racing	R: (Italy) Lorenzo Patrese; W: (United Arab Emirates) Hamda Al Qubaisi	Italian GT Championship; TCR Italy Touring Car Championship; Porsche Carrera Cup Italia; Clio Cup Europe; Italian Prototype Championship; Mini Challenge Italy
3	R1	(Italy) Vallelunga Circuit	27 June	(United Kingdom) Oliver Bearman	(United Kingdom) Oliver Bearman	(United Kingdom) Oliver Bearman	(Netherlands) Van Amersfoort Racing	R: (Denmark) Conrad Laursen; W: (United Arab Emirates) Hamda Al Qubaisi	TCR Italy Touring Car Championship
3	R2	(Italy) Vallelunga Circuit	27 June	(Colombia) Sebastián Montoya	(United Kingdom) Oliver Bearman	(United Kingdom) Oliver Bearman	(Netherlands) Van Amersfoort Racing	R: (Denmark) Conrad Laursen; W: (Spain) Maya Weug	TCR Italy Touring Car Championship
3	R3	(Italy) Vallelunga Circuit	27 June	(United Kingdom) Oliver Bearman	(Germany) Tim Tramnitz	(United Kingdom) Oliver Bearman	(Netherlands) Van Amersfoort Racing	R: (Austria) Charlie Wurz; W: (United Arab Emirates) Hamda Al Qubaisi	TCR Italy Touring Car Championship
4	R1	(Italy) Imola Circuit	24 July	(United Kingdom) Oliver Bearman	(Italy) Francesco Braschi	(United Kingdom) Oliver Bearman	(Netherlands) Van Amersfoort Racing	R: (Russia) Nikita Bedrin; W: (United Arab Emirates) Hamda Al Qubaisi	International GT Open; Euroformula Open; TCR Italy Touring Car Championship; Porsche Carrera Cup Italia; Clio Cup Europe
4	R2	(Italy) Imola Circuit	25 July	(United Kingdom) Oliver Bearman	(Italy) Leonardo Fornaroli	(United Kingdom) Oliver Bearman	(Netherlands) Van Amersfoort Racing	R: (Russia) Nikita Bedrin; W: (Spain) Maya Weug	International GT Open; Euroformula Open; TCR Italy Touring Car Championship; Porsche Carrera Cup Italia; Clio Cup Europe
4	R3	(Italy) Imola Circuit	25 July	(United Kingdom) Oliver Bearman	(Colombia) Sebastián Montoya	(Russia) Nikita Bedrin	(Netherlands) Van Amersfoort Racing	R: (Russia) Nikita Bedrin; W: (United Arab Emirates) Hamda Al Qubaisi	International GT Open; Euroformula Open; TCR Italy Touring Car Championship; Porsche Carrera Cup Italia; Clio Cup Europe
5	R1	(Austria) Red Bull Ring	11 September	(Colombia) Sebastián Montoya	(Colombia) Sebastián Montoya	(United Kingdom) Oliver Bearman	(Netherlands) Van Amersfoort Racing	R: (Italy) Andrea Kimi Antonelli; W: (Spain) Maya Weug	International GT Open; Euroformula Open; Formula Regional European Championship
5	R2	(Austria) Red Bull Ring	12 September	(Italy) Leonardo Fornaroli	(Italy) Leonardo Fornaroli	(Germany) Tim Tramnitz	(Germany) US Racing	R: (Italy) Francesco Braschi; W: (Spain) Maya Weug	International GT Open; Euroformula Open; Formula Regional European Championship
5	R3	(Austria) Red Bull Ring	12 September	(Germany) Tim Tramnitz	(Germany) Tim Tramnitz	(Germany) Tim Tramnitz	(Germany) US Racing	R: (Colombia) Nicolás Baptiste; W: (Spain) Maya Weug	International GT Open; Euroformula Open; Formula Regional European Championship
6	R1	(Italy) Mugello Circuit	9 October	(Austria) Joshua Dufek	(Paraguay) Joshua Dürksen	(Paraguay) Joshua Dürksen	(Germany) BWT Mücke Motorsport	R: (Russia) Nikita Bedrin; W: (Spain) Maya Weug	Formula Regional European Championship; Italian GT Championship; TCR Italy Touring Car Championship; Mini Challenge Italy
6	R2	(Italy) Mugello Circuit	10 October	(Austria) Joshua Dufek	(Austria) Joshua Dufek	(Austria) Joshua Dufek	(Netherlands) Van Amersfoort Racing	R: (Russia) Nikita Bedrin; W: (United Arab Emirates) Hamda Al Qubaisi	Formula Regional European Championship; Italian GT Championship; TCR Italy Touring Car Championship; Mini Challenge Italy
6	R3	(Italy) Mugello Circuit	10 October	(Austria) Joshua Dufek	(Italy) Leonardo Fornaroli	(Paraguay) Joshua Dürksen	(Germany) BWT Mücke Motorsport	R: (Russia) Nikita Bedrin; W: (United Arab Emirates) Hamda Al Qubaisi	Formula Regional European Championship; Italian GT Championship; TCR Italy Touring Car Championship; Mini Challenge Italy
7	R1	(Italy) Autodromo Nazionale di Monza	30 October	(Italy) Lorenzo Patrese	(Colombia) Sebastián Montoya	(United Kingdom) Oliver Bearman	(Netherlands) Van Amersfoort Racing	R: (Italy) Andrea Kimi Antonelli; W: (United Arab Emirates) Hamda Al Qubaisi	Formula Regional European Championship; Italian GT Championship; Porsche Carrera Cup Italia; Clio Cup Europe
7	R2	(Italy) Autodromo Nazionale di Monza	30 October	(Italy) Lorenzo Patrese	(Paraguay) Joshua Dürksen	(United Kingdom) Oliver Bearman	(Netherlands) Van Amersfoort Racing	R: (Italy) Andrea Kimi Antonelli; W: (Spain) Maya Weug	Formula Regional European Championship; Italian GT Championship; Porsche Carrera Cup Italia; Clio Cup Europe
7	R3	(Italy) Autodromo Nazionale di Monza	31 October	(Italy) Lorenzo Patrese	(Denmark) Conrad Laursen	(United Kingdom) Oliver Bearman	(Netherlands) Van Amersfoort Racing	R: (Italy) Andrea Kimi Antonelli; W: (Spain) Maya Weug	Formula Regional European Championship; Italian GT Championship; Porsche Carrera Cup Italia; Clio Cup Europe

== Championship standings ==
Points were awarded to the top 10 classified finishers in each race. No points were awarded for pole position or fastest lap. The final classifications for the individual standings were obtained by summing up the scores on the 16 best results obtained during the races held.

Position	**1st**	**2nd**	**3rd**	**4th**	**5th**	**6th**	**7th**	**8th**	**9th**	**10th**
Points	25	18	15	12	10	8	6	4	2	1

=== Drivers' championship ===
Pos	Driver	LEC (France)			MIS (Italy)			VLL (Italy)			IMO (Italy)			RBR (Austria)			MUG (Italy)			MNZ (Italy)			Pen.	Pts
Pos	Driver	R1	R2	R3	R1	R2	R3	R1	R2	R3	R1	R2	R3	R1	R2	R3	R1	R2	R3	R1	R2	R3	Pen.	Pts
1	(United Kingdom) Oliver Bearman	3	**7**	2	2	**1**	**1**	**1**	1	**1**	**1**	**1**	**DSQ**	1	3	20	4	7	10	1	1	1	10	343
2	(Germany) Tim Tramnitz	2	1	**1**				3	2	3				2	1	**1**	7	5	9	4	6	5		232
3	(Russia) Kirill Smal	**1**	3	Ret	9	4	4	7	6	5	Ret	25	14	4	4	3	6	3	4	6	5	2		198
4	(Colombia) Sebastián Montoya	35†	4	5	6	2	3	2	**Ret**	2	Ret	8	3	**3**	Ret	Ret	3	2	28	5	2	Ret		194
5	(Italy) Leonardo Fornaroli	7	8	4	**1**	3	2	10	8	8	Ret	2	2	6	**2**	7	Ret	8	2	9	Ret	DNS		180
6	(Paraguay) Joshua Dürksen	8	5	7	15	15	15	4	4	Ret	25†	4	6	Ret	5	22	1	4	1	3	4	6		171
7	(Austria) Joshua Dufek	9	22	8	28†	9	6	5	3	10	3	6	4	5	Ret	2	**2**	**1**	**Ret**	22	9	8		154
8	(Russia) Nikita Bedrin	13	21	Ret	5	10	Ret	16	Ret	15	2	3	1	Ret	Ret	17	5	6	3	16	10	20		103
9	(Denmark) Conrad Laursen	5	Ret	WD	18	Ret	Ret	8	5	6	5	7	Ret	13	13	11	9	13	11	7	8	25		60
10	(Italy) Andrea Kimi Antonelli													9	12	9	10	10	13	2	3	3		54
11	(Russia) Vladislav Lomko	4	6	3				9	Ret	WD										Ret	13	7		43
12	(Italy) Lorenzo Patrese	Ret	10	27	11	14	10	11	Ret	22	11	16	7	11	10	6	13	9	26†	**27**†	**7**	**4**		37
13	(France) Victor Bernier	6	Ret	13	7	5	7																	30
14	(Italy) Francesco Simonazzi	14	9	9										7	7	4	16	18	15	26†	11	27		28
15	(United Kingdom) Luke Browning	10	2	6																				27
16	(Italy) Francesco Braschi	20	Ret	16	17	17	13	24	Ret	Ret	24†	Ret	5	10	6	Ret	11	Ret	6	25	31†	WD		27
17	(United Arab Emirates) Hamda Al Qubaisi	30	27	29†	3	20	9	12	16	7	18	21	12	19	Ret	18	Ret	15	17	10	Ret	29†		24
18	(Mexico) Erick Zúñiga	17	16	31	16	12	14	20	19	Ret	4	13	9	8	11	15	14	11	8	18	20	Ret		22
19	(France) Sami Meguetounif	11	Ret	14	8	6	5																	22
20	(Austria) Charlie Wurz							19	12	4				21	8	8								20
21	(Hungary) Bence Válint	21	Ret	11	29†	11	Ret	13	7	9	Ret	5	26	15	9	27	15	26†	12	Ret	17	26		20
22	(Mexico) Santiago Ramos	12	12	12	WD	WD	WD				12	22	15	16	15	Ret	8	Ret	5	14	12	10		15
23	(Poland) Piotr Wiśnicki	27	11	21	22	18	16	17	10	17	8	20	11	12	16	23	12	14	7	8	30†	22		15
24	(Colombia) Nicolás Baptiste	29	18	26	19	8	22	18	15	19	13	24	24	Ret	17	5	24	19	25	Ret	32†	17		14
25	(Germany) Jonas Ried	18	26	10	4	16	24	22	24	23	19	Ret	23	26	Ret	Ret	22	27	20	Ret	23	16		13
26	(China) Cenyu Han	15	31†	18	14	Ret	8	6	23	Ret	16	10	21	20	22	13								13
27	(Switzerland) Samir Ben	33	Ret	32	12	26	17	15	20	Ret	6	Ret	8	14	24†	25	Ret	25	27	19	33†	23		12
28	(Italy) Pietro Armanni	34	15	30	26	22	21	Ret	Ret	14	7	9	18	25	23†	21	23	24	19	11	18	11		8
29	(Italy) Leonardo Bizzotto	16	24	17	10	7	Ret	14	14	11	Ret	17	10	Ret	21	26	19	20	16	20	21	31		8
30	(Italy) Vittorio Catino	31	30†	Ret				28	22	Ret	9	11	17											2
31	(Hungary) Levente Révész	28	20	Ret	20	Ret	19	21	9	13	15	19	20	23	20	14	Ret	12	14	29†	22	28†		2
32	(France) Macéo Capietto										17	Ret	13							30†	14	9		2
33	(Portugal) Pedro Perino	36†	23	25	27	24	25	27	13	Ret	23	18	27†	Ret	19	10	21	16	24	15	15	15		1
34	(Mexico) Jorge Garcíarce	32	29†	28	25	23	23	25	Ret	18	10	15	22	27	Ret	24	25	23	23	13	25	21		1
35	(Spain) Maya Weug	19	17	15	13	25	12	Ret	11	12	22	14	25	17	14	16	20	17	22	21	29	14		0
36	(Poland) Kacper Sztuka	23	13	19	23	13	11	23	17	20	14	12	Ret	18	18	19	17	22	18	17	16	30		0
37	(United Kingdom) Oliver Gray																18	21	21	12	26	12		0
38	(Greece) Georgis Markogiannis	24	19	22				26	21	21	21	23	19	24	Ret	12				23	19	18		0
39	(Netherlands) Robert de Haan																			Ret	27	13		0
40	(France) Marcus Amand	22	14	23	21	19	20																	0
41	(Switzerland) Eron Rexhepi	25	25	20	24	21	18	Ret	18	16	20	Ret	16	22	Ret	WD								0
42	(Australia) Marcos Flack																			28†	24	19		0
43	(Italy) Rocco Mazzola																			24	28	24		0
44	(Morocco) Suleiman Zanfari	26	28†	24																				0
Pos	Driver	R1	R2	R3	R1	R2	R3	R1	R2	R3	R1	R2	R3	R1	R2	R3	R1	R2	R3	R1	R2	R3	Pen.	Pts
Pos	Driver	LEC (France)			MIS (Italy)			VLL (Italy)			IMO (Italy)			RBR (Austria)			MUG (Italy)			MNZ (Italy)			Pen.	Pts

Colour	Result
Gold	Winner
Silver	Second place
Bronze	Third place
Green	Points classification
Blue	Non-points classification
Blue	Non-classified finish (NC)
Purple	Retired, not classified (Ret)
Red	Did not qualify (DNQ)
Red	Did not pre-qualify (DNPQ)
Black	Disqualified (DSQ)
White	Did not start (DNS)
White	Withdrew (WD)
White	Race cancelled (C)
Blank	Did not practice (DNP)
Blank	Did not arrive (DNA)
Blank	Excluded (EX)

**Bold** – Pole
Italics – Fastest Lap
† — Did not finish, but classified

=== Secondary classes standings ===
Pos	Driver	LEC (France)			MIS (Italy)			VLL (Italy)			IMO (Italy)			RBR (Austria)			MUG (Italy)			MNZ (Italy)			Pts
Pos	Driver	R1	R2	R3	R1	R2	R3	R1	R2	R3	R1	R2	R3	R1	R2	R3	R1	R2	R3	R1	R2	R3	Pts
Rookies' championship
1	(Russia) Nikita Bedrin	2	9	Ret	2	3	Ret	5	Ret	7	1	1	1	Ret	Ret	10	1	1	1	6	4	13	240
2	(Denmark) Conrad Laursen	1	Ret	WD	8	Ret	Ret	1	1	2	2	2	Ret	4	5	6	2	5	3	2	3	16	239
3	(Italy) Lorenzo Patrese	Ret	1	11	4	5	1	2	Ret	12	6	7	3	3	3	2	5	2	14†	14†	2	2	231
4	(Italy) Andrea Kimi Antonelli													1	4	4	3	3	4	1	1	1	166
5	(Italy) Francesco Braschi	6	Ret	3	7	7	4	11	Ret	Ret	16†	Ret	2	2	1	Ret	4	Ret	2	11	18†	WD	138
6	(Italy) Leonardo Bizzotto	3	11	4	3	1	Ret	3	6	3	Ret	8	5	Ret	11	14	8	9	6	9	10	19	136
7	(Spain) Maya Weug	5	5	2	6	12	3	Ret	3	4	14	6	14	6	6	9	9	7	11	10	17	7	129
8	(Poland) Kacper Sztuka	8	2	5	12	4	2	10	8	10	8	5	Ret	7	8	11	6	11	7	7	7	18	118
9	(Colombia) Nicolás Baptiste	12	6	10	9	2	10	6	7	9	7	12	13	Ret	7	1	13	8	13	Ret	19†	10	88
10	(Italy) Pietro Armanni	15	4	12	14	10	9	Ret	Ret	6	4	3	9	12	12†	12	12	12	8	3	8	4	87
11	(Austria) Charlie Wurz							7	4	1				8	2	3							80
12	(Germany) Jonas Ried	4	13	1	1	6	11	9	13	13	11	Ret	12	13	Ret	Ret	11	14	9	Ret	12	9	76
13	(Hungary) Levente Révész	11	8	Ret	10	Ret	7	8	2	5	9	10	11	10	10	8	Ret	4	5	16†	11	17†	74
14	(Switzerland) Samir Ben	14	Ret	13	5	13	5	4	10	Ret	3	Ret	4	5	13†	13	Ret	13	15	8	20†	14	74
15	(Portugal) Pedro Perino	16†	10	9	15	11	12	13	5	Ret	15	9	15†	Ret	9	5	10	6	12	5	6	8	58
16	(France) Macéo Capietto										10	Ret	6							17†	5	3	34
17	(France) Marcus Amand	7	3	8	11	8	8																33
18	(Switzerland) Eron Rexhepi	10	12	6	13	9	6	Ret	9	8	12	Ret	7	9	Ret	WD							33
19	(United Kingdom) Oliver Gray																7	10	10	4	14	5	30
20	(Italy) Vittorio Catino	13	14†	Ret				14	12	Ret	5	4	8										26
21	(Greece) Georgis Markogiannis	9	7	7				12	11	11	13	11	10	11	Ret	7				12	9	11	23
22	(Netherlands) Robert de Haan																			Ret	15	6	8
23	(Australia) Marcos Flack																			15†	13	12	0
24	(Italy) Rocco Mazzola																			13	16	15	0
Women's championship
1	(Spain) Maya Weug	1	1	1	2	2	2	Ret	1	2	2	1	2	1	1	1	1	2	2	2	1	1	365
2	(United Arab Emirates) Hamda Al Qubaisi	2	2	2	1	1	1	1	2	1	1	2	1	2	Ret	2	Ret	1	1	1	Ret	2†	358
Pos	Driver	R1	R2	R3	R1	R2	R3	R1	R2	R3	R1	R2	R3	R1	R2	R3	R1	R2	R3	R1	R2	R3	Pts
Pos	Driver	LEC (France)			MIS (Italy)			VLL (Italy)			IMO (Italy)			RBR (Austria)			MUG (Italy)			MNZ (Italy)			Pts

Colour	Result
Gold	Winner
Silver	Second place
Bronze	Third place
Green	Points classification
Blue	Non-points classification
Blue	Non-classified finish (NC)
Purple	Retired, not classified (Ret)
Red	Did not qualify (DNQ)
Red	Did not pre-qualify (DNPQ)
Black	Disqualified (DSQ)
White	Did not start (DNS)
White	Withdrew (WD)
White	Race cancelled (C)
Blank	Did not practice (DNP)
Blank	Did not arrive (DNA)
Blank	Excluded (EX)

† — Did not finish, but classified

=== Teams' championship ===
Each team acquires the points earned by their two best drivers in each race.

Pos	Driver	LEC (France)			MIS (Italy)			VLL (Italy)			IMO (Italy)			RBR (Austria)			MUG (Italy)			MNZ (Italy)			Pts
Pos	Driver	R1	R2	R3	R1	R2	R3	R1	R2	R3	R1	R2	R3	R1	R2	R3	R1	R2	R3	R1	R2	R3	Pts
1	(Netherlands) Van Amersfoort Racing	3	7	2	2	1	1	1	1	1	1	1	1	1	3	2	2	1	3	1	1	1	585
1	(Netherlands) Van Amersfoort Racing	9	21	8	5	9	6	5	3	9	2	3	4	5	9	13	4	6	10	16	9	8	585
2	(Italy) Prema Powerteam	1	3	5	3	2	3	2	5	2	5	7	3	3	4	3	3	2	4	2	2	2	483
2	(Italy) Prema Powerteam	5	4	29†	6	4	4	7	6	4	17	8	12	4	8	8	6	3	11	5	3	3	483
3	(Germany) US Racing	2	1	1				3	2	3				2	1	1	7	5	9	4	6	5	286
3	(Germany) US Racing	4	2	3				9	Ret	WD				Ret	19	10	21	16	24	15	13	7	286
4	(Germany) BWT Mücke Motorsport	8	5	7	4	12	14	4	4	23	4	4	6	8	5	15	1	4	1	3	4	6	206
4	(Germany) BWT Mücke Motorsport	17	16	10	15	15	15	20	19	Ret	19	13	9	26	11	22	14	11	8	18	20	16	206
5	(Italy) Iron Lynx	7	8	4	1	3	2	10	8	8	7	2	2	6	2	7	17	8	2	9	18	11	189
5	(Italy) Iron Lynx	19	15	15	13	22	12	Ret	11	12	22	9	18	17	14	16	20	17	18	11	29	14	189
6	(Switzerland) Jenzer Motorsport	12	11	12	12	17	13	15	10	17	6	15	5	10	6	23	8	14	5	8	12	10	63
6	(Switzerland) Jenzer Motorsport	20	12	16	17	18	16	17	20	18	8	20	8	12	15	24	11	23	6	13	25	21	63
7	(France) R-ace GP	6	14	13	7	5	5																52
7	(France) R-ace GP	11	Ret	14	8	6	7																52
8	(San Marino) AKM Motorsport	28	10	27	11	14	10	11	9	13	11	16	7	11	10	6	13	9	14	27†	7	4	39
8	(San Marino) AKM Motorsport	Ret	20	Ret	20	Ret	19	21	Ret	22	15	19	20	23	20	14	Ret	12	26†	29†	22	28†	39
9	(Italy) BVM Racing	14	9	9	10	7	18	14	14	11	20	17	10	7	7	4	16	18	15	12	11	12	36
9	(Italy) BVM Racing	16	24	17	24	21	Ret	Ret	18	16	Ret	Ret	16	22	21	26	18	20	16	20	21	27	36
10	(Italy) Cram Motorsport	24	18	22	19	8	22	18	15	19	9	11	17	24	17	5	24	19	25	23	19	17	16
10	(Italy) Cram Motorsport	26	19	24				26	21	21	13	23	19	Ret	Ret	12				24	24	18	16
11	(Slovenia) AS Motorsport	23	13	19	23	13	11	23	17	20	14	12	Ret	18	18	19				17	16	30	0
12	(Portugal) DR Formula RP Motorsport	36†	23	25	27	24	25	27	13	Ret	23	18	27†										0
Pos	Driver	R1	R2	R3	R1	R2	R3	R1	R2	R3	R1	R2	R3	R1	R2	R3	R1	R2	R3	R1	R2	R3	Pts
Pos	Driver	LEC (France)			MIS (Italy)			VLL (Italy)			IMO (Italy)			RBR (Austria)			MUG (Italy)			MNZ (Italy)			Pts

Colour	Result
Gold	Winner
Silver	Second place
Bronze	Third place
Green	Points classification
Blue	Non-points classification
Blue	Non-classified finish (NC)
Purple	Retired, not classified (Ret)
Red	Did not qualify (DNQ)
Red	Did not pre-qualify (DNPQ)
Black	Disqualified (DSQ)
White	Did not start (DNS)
White	Withdrew (WD)
White	Race cancelled (C)
Blank	Did not practice (DNP)
Blank	Did not arrive (DNA)
Blank	Excluded (EX)

**Bold** – Pole
Italics – Fastest Lap
† — Did not finish, but classified
