= Alexander Fach =

Swiss racing driver (born 2002)

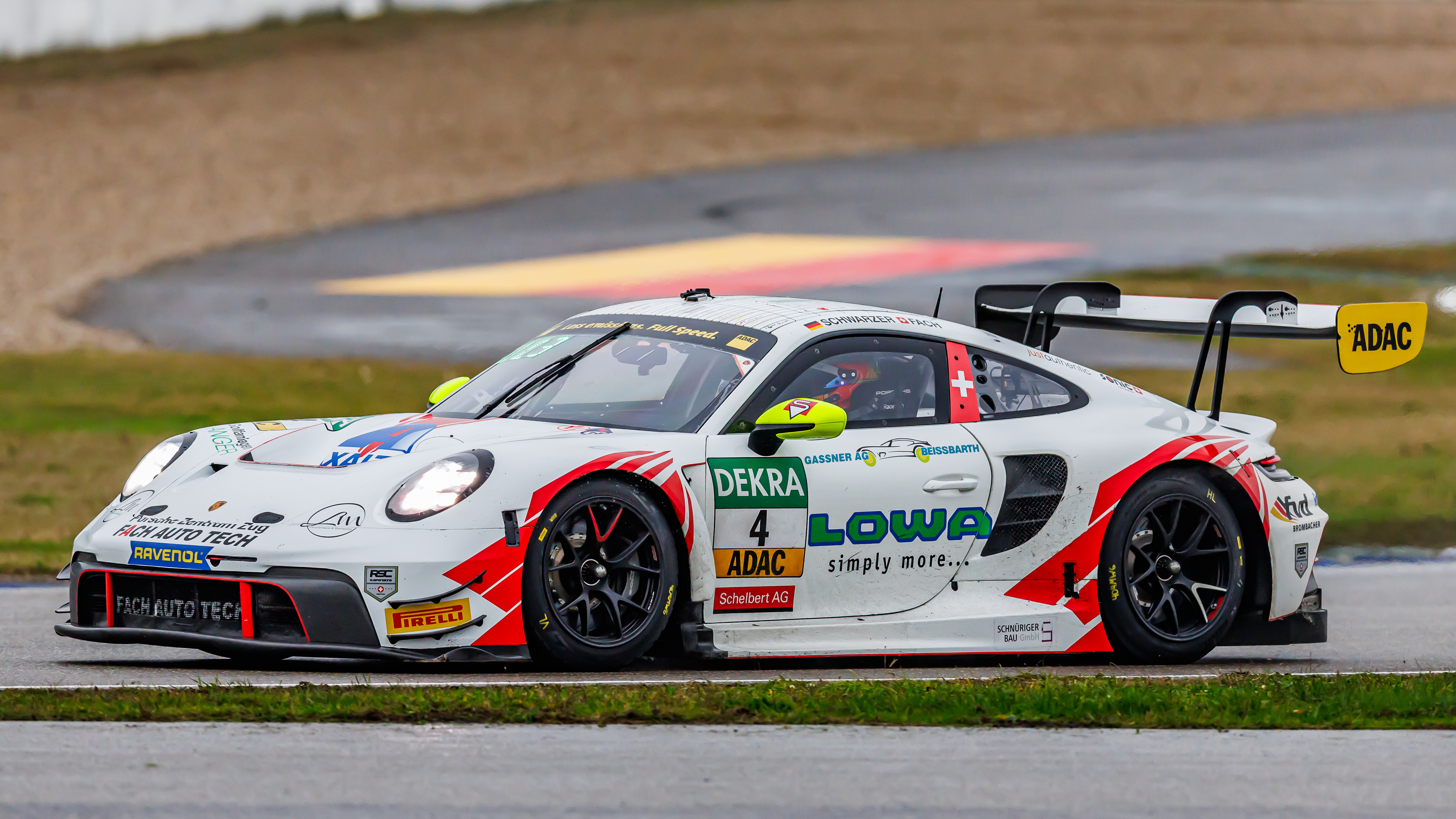
- Fach in 2024
- Nationality: (Switzerland) Swiss
- Born: Alexander Fach-Stolz Jr. 7 June 2002 (age 24) Sattel, Switzerland
- Categorisation: FIA Silver

Championship titles
- 2024, 2025 2020, 2021: ADAC GT Masters – Pro-Am; Porsche Sports Cup Suisse

Alexander Fach-Stolz Jr. (born 7 June 2002) is a Swiss racing driver who last competed for Fach Auto Tech in International GT Open.

== Personal life ==
Fach is the son of Fach Auto Tech director Alexander Fach Sr.

== Career ==
Fach made his car racing debut for his family's team in 2019, racing in the Porsche GT3 Cup Challenge Suisse, which he won in 2020 and 2021. During this time span, Fach also competed in the last two rounds of the 2020 Porsche Carrera Cup Germany season for Overdrive Racing by Huber.

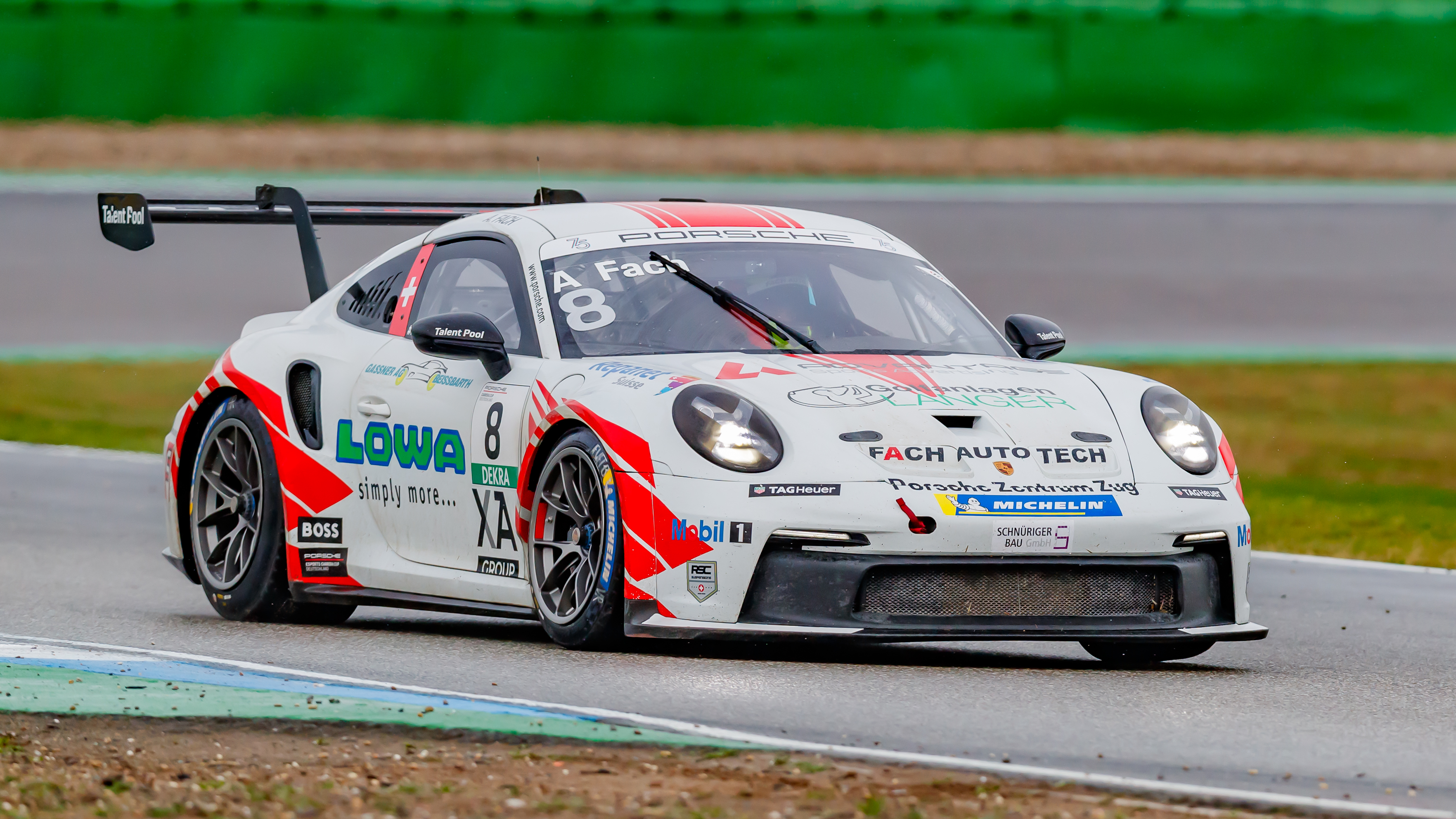
Fach racing for Fach Auto Tech in PCCD at the Hockenheimring in 2023.

At the beginning of 2022, Fach made his debut in endurance racing at the Dubai 24 Hour for his family team in the 992 Am class. For the rest of the year, Fach continued with the team for a dual campaign in Porsche Carrera Cup Germany and Porsche Supercup. In his first full season in the German series, Fach scored a best result of eighth twice to take 15th in the overall standings and third in the rookie points, with three class wins to his name. In the latter meanwhile, Fach took a best result of ninth at the season-ending race at Monza en route to a 20th-place points finish. After finishing on the 992 podium at the Dubai 24 Hour, Fach returned to Europe for the rest of the year, partaking in another dual campaign in Porsche Carrera Cup Germany and Porsche Supercup. In the former, Fach finished tenth in points with a best result of sixth at Zandvoort, whereas in the latter, he took a surprise win at Silverstone to secure an eighth-place points finish.

In 2024, Fach and his Porsche-affiliated team joined ADAC GT Masters alongside Alexander Schwarzer in the Pro-Am class for his debut in GT3 machinery. In his rookie year in the series, Fach took a best result of second at both Zandvoort and Spa, to finish seventh in the overall standings, as he clinched the Pro-Am title as the only full-time car in the class. During 2024, Fach also raced for fellow Porsche-fielding teams Lionspeed x Herberth and Rutronik Racing at the 24 Hours of Spa and the 3 Hours of Monza respectively. Remaining in ADAC GT Masters the following year, Fach took his only overall win of the season in race one at the Nürburgring, as well as third-place finishes at the same venue and at the Hockenheimring to finish sixth overall, as well as securing his second Pro-Am title.

In 2026, Fach and Schwarzer switched to International GT Open, where they also entered the Pro-Am class. The pair started off the season with class wins at Algarve and Spa, before winning both races at Misano with stand-in Lucas Wolf. Fach then qualified on overall pole at the Hungaroring, before taking two further podiums and a class win at Barcelona to secure runner-up honours in Pro-Am.

== Racing record ==
=== Racing career summary ===
| Season | Series | Team | Races | Wins | Poles | F/Laps | Podiums | Points | Position |
|---|---|---|---|---|---|---|---|---|---|
| 2019 | Porsche GT3 Cup Challenge Suisse | Fach Auto Tech | | | | | | | |
| 2020 | Porsche Sports Cup Suisse | Fach Auto Tech | | | | | | | **1st** |
| 2020 | Porsche Carrera Cup Germany | Overdrive Racing by Huber | 4 | 0 | 0 | 0 | 0 | 6 | 21st |
| 2021 | Porsche Sports Cup Suisse | Fach Auto Tech | | | | | | | **1st** |
| 2022 | 24H GT Series – 992 Am | Fach Auto Tech | 1 | 0 | 0 | 0 | 0 | 4 | NC |
| 2022 | Porsche Supercup | Fach Auto Tech | 8 | 0 | 0 | 0 | 0 | 12 | 20th |
| 2022 | Porsche Carrera Cup Germany | Fach Auto Tech | 16 | 0 | 0 | 0 | 0 | 47 | 15th |
| 2022–23 | Middle East Trophy – 992 | Fach Auto Tech | 1 | 0 | 0 | 0 | 1 | 36 | NC |
| 2023 | Porsche Carrera Cup Germany | Fach Auto Tech | 16 | 0 | 0 | 0 | 0 | 84 | 10th |
| 2023 | Porsche Supercup | Fach Auto Tech | 8 | 1 | 0 | 0 | 1 | 63 | 8th |
| 2024 | ADAC GT Masters | Fach Auto Tech | 12 | 0 | 0 | 0 | 3 | 120 | 7th |
| 2024 | GT World Challenge Europe Endurance Cup | Lionspeed x Herberth | 1 | 0 | 0 | 0 | 0 | 0 | NC |
| 2024 | GT World Challenge Europe Endurance Cup | Rutronik Racing | 1 | 0 | 0 | 0 | 0 | 0 | NC |
| 2024 | GT World Challenge Europe Endurance Cup – Bronze | Lionspeed x Herberth | 1 | 0 | 0 | 0 | 0 | 20 | 21st |
| 2024 | GT World Challenge Europe Endurance Cup – Bronze | Rutronik Racing | 1 | 0 | 0 | 0 | 0 | 20 | 21st |
| 2024 | Intercontinental GT Challenge | Lionspeed x Herberth | 1 | 0 | 0 | 0 | 0 | 4 | 22nd |
| 2025 | ADAC GT Masters | Fach Auto Tech | 12 | 1 | 1 | 2 | 3 | 140 | 6th |
| 2026 | International GT Open | Fach Auto Tech | 14 | 0 | 1 | 0 | 0 | 38 | 11th |
| 2026 | International GT Open – Pro-Am | Fach Auto Tech | 14 | 5 | 1 | 1 | 7 | 96 | **2nd** |
| 2026 | Nürburgring Langstrecken-Serie – SP10 Pro-Am | Car Collection Motorsport | 1 | 0 | 0 | 0 | 0 | 4 | NC |

=== Complete Porsche Supercup results ===
(key) (Races in bold indicate pole position) (Races in italics indicate fastest lap)

| Year | Team | 1 | 2 | 3 | 4 | 5 | 6 | 7 | 8 | DC | Points |
|---|---|---|---|---|---|---|---|---|---|---|---|
| 2022 | Fach Auto Tech | IMO; 16 | MON; 17 | SIL; Ret | RBR; 15 | LEC; 16 | SPA; 14 | ZND; 27 | MNZ; 9 | 20th | 12 |
| 2023 | Fach Auto Tech | MON; 14 | RBR; Ret | SIL; 1 | HUN; 9 | SPA; 17 | ZND; 7 | ZND; 8 | MNZ; 6 | 8th | 63 |

=== Complete ADAC GT Masters results ===
(key) (Races in bold indicate pole position) (Races in italics indicate fastest lap)

| Year | Team | Car | 1 | 2 | 3 | 4 | 5 | 6 | 7 | 8 | 9 | 10 | 11 | 12 | DC | Points |
|---|---|---|---|---|---|---|---|---|---|---|---|---|---|---|---|---|
| 2024 | Fach Auto Tech | Porsche 911 GT3 R (992) | OSC; 1; 8 | OSC; 2; 8 | ZAN; 1; 9 | ZAN; 2; 2 | NÜR; 1; 8 | NÜR; 2; 7 | SPA; 1; 15† | SPA; 2; 2 | RBR; 1; 11 | RBR; 2; 12 | HOC; 1; 4 | HOC; 2; 5 | 7th | 120 |
| 2025 | Fach Auto Tech | Porsche 911 GT3 R (992) | LAU; 1; 4 | LAU; 2; 10 | ZAN; 1; 13 | ZAN; 2; 6^{2} | NÜR; 1; 1 | NÜR; 2; 3 | SAL; 1; 11^{3} | SAL; 2; 6 | RBR; 1; 10 | RBR; 2; 9 | HOC; 1; 3 | **HOC**; **2**; 4^{1} | 6th | 140 |

=== Complete GT World Challenge Europe results ===
==== GT World Challenge Europe Endurance Cup ====
(Races in bold indicate pole position) (Races in italics indicate fastest lap)

| Year | Team | Car | Class | 1 | 2 | 3 | 4 | 5 | 6 | 7 | Pos. | Points |
|---|---|---|---|---|---|---|---|---|---|---|---|---|
| 2024 | Lionspeed x Herberth | Porsche 911 GT3 R (992) | Bronze | LEC | SPA; 6H; 41 | SPA; 12H; 28 | SPA; 24H; 22 | NÜR | | | 21st | 20 |
| 2024 | Rutronik Racing | Porsche 911 GT3 R (992) | Bronze | | | | | | MNZ; 17 | JED | 21st | 20 |

=== Complete International GT Open results ===
(key) (Races in bold indicate pole position) (Races in italics indicate fastest lap)

| Year | Team | Car | Class | 1 | 2 | 3 | 4 | 5 | 6 | 7 | 8 | 9 | 10 | 11 | 12 | 13 | 14 | Pos. | Points |
|---|---|---|---|---|---|---|---|---|---|---|---|---|---|---|---|---|---|---|---|
| 2026 | Fach Auto Tech | Porsche 911 GT3 R (992.2) | Pro-Am | ALG; 1; 1 | ALG; 2; 8 | SPA; 1 | MIS; 1; 1 | MIS; 2; 1 | **HUN**; **1**; 9 | HUN; 2; 4 | LEC; 1; 4 | LEC; 2; 6 | HOC; 1 Ret | HOC; 2; 2 | MNZ; 5 | CAT; 1; 1 | CAT; 2; 3 | 2nd | 96 |
