= 2026 International GT Open =

Motorsport season

The 2026 International GT Open was the twenty-first season of the International GT Open, the grand tourer-style sports car racing series founded in 2006 by the Spanish GT Sport Organización. It began on 17 April at the Algarve International Circuit and finished at the Circuit de Barcelona-Catalunya on 25 October after eight rounds.

== Calendar ==
The calendar was announced on 25 August 2025.

Round		Circuit	Date	Map of circuit locations
1	R1	(Portugal) Algarve International Circuit, Portimão	17–19 April	2026 International GT Open is located in Europe
1	R2	(Portugal) Algarve International Circuit, Portimão	17–19 April	2026 International GT Open is located in Europe
2		(Belgium) Circuit de Spa-Francorchamps, Stavelot	15–17 May	2026 International GT Open is located in Europe
3	R1	(Italy) Misano World Circuit Marco Simoncelli, Misano Adriatico	5–7 June	2026 International GT Open is located in Europe
3	R2	(Italy) Misano World Circuit Marco Simoncelli, Misano Adriatico	5–7 June	2026 International GT Open is located in Europe
4	R1	(Hungary) Hungaroring, Mogyoród	3–5 July	2026 International GT Open is located in Europe
4	R2	(Hungary) Hungaroring, Mogyoród	3–5 July	2026 International GT Open is located in Europe
5	R1	(France) Circuit Paul Ricard, Le Castellet	17–19 July	2026 International GT Open is located in Europe
5	R2	(France) Circuit Paul Ricard, Le Castellet	17–19 July	2026 International GT Open is located in Europe
6	R1	(Germany) Hockenheimring, Hockenheim	11–13 September	2026 International GT Open is located in Europe
6	R2	(Germany) Hockenheimring, Hockenheim	11–13 September	2026 International GT Open is located in Europe
7		(Italy) Autodromo Nazionale di Monza, Monza	25–27 September	2026 International GT Open is located in Europe
8	R1	(Spain) Circuit de Barcelona-Catalunya, Montmeló	23–25 October	2026 International GT Open is located in Europe
8	R2	(Spain) Circuit de Barcelona-Catalunya, Montmeló	23–25 October	2026 International GT Open is located in Europe

== Entry list ==
Team	Car	Engine	No.	Drivers	Class	Rounds
(Poland) Olimp Racing	Ferrari 296 GT3 1 Ferrari 296 GT3 Evo 2–8	Ferrari F163CE 3.0 L Turbo V6	5	(Poland) Krystian Korzeniowski	Am	All
(Poland) Olimp Racing	Ferrari 296 GT3 1 Ferrari 296 GT3 Evo 2–8	Ferrari F163CE 3.0 L Turbo V6	5	(Poland) Stanisław Jedliński	Am	1–7
(Poland) Olimp Racing	Ferrari 296 GT3 Evo 1–7; Audi R8 LMS Evo II 8	Ferrari F163CE 3.0 L Turbo V6	777	(Poland) Karol Basz	PA	All
(Poland) Olimp Racing	Ferrari 296 GT3 Evo 1–7; Audi R8 LMS Evo II 8	Ferrari F163CE 3.0 L Turbo V6	777	(Poland) Marcin Jedliński	PA	All
(Austria) Baron Motorsport Team	Ferrari 296 GT3	Ferrari F163CE 3.0 L Turbo V6	6	(Poland) Adrian Lewandowski	Am	All
(Austria) Baron Motorsport Team	Ferrari 296 GT3	Ferrari F163CE 3.0 L Turbo V6	6	(Poland) Andrzej Lewandowski	Am	1–3, 5, 7
(Poland) PTT Racing	BMW M4 GT3 Evo	BMW P58 3.0 L Turbo I6	7	(Poland) Hubert Darmetko	PA	2–5
(Poland) PTT Racing	BMW M4 GT3 Evo	BMW P58 3.0 L Turbo I6	7	(Poland) Fabian Dybionka	PA	2–5
(Germany) Schubert Motorsport	BMW M4 GT3 Evo	BMW P58 3.0 L Turbo I6	7	(Poland) Hubert Darmetko	PA	8
(Germany) Schubert Motorsport	BMW M4 GT3 Evo	BMW P58 3.0 L Turbo I6	7	(Poland) Fabian Dybionka	PA	8
(Germany) GetSpeed	Mercedes-AMG GT3 Evo	Mercedes-AMG M159 6.2 L V8	9	(United States) Anthony Bartone	P	3
(Germany) GetSpeed	Mercedes-AMG GT3 Evo	Mercedes-AMG M159 6.2 L V8	9	(Germany) Fabian Schiller	P	3
(Bahrain) 2 Seas Motorsport	Mercedes-AMG GT3 Evo	Mercedes-AMG M159 6.2 L V8	10	(United States) Jason Hart	Am	2
(Bahrain) 2 Seas Motorsport	Mercedes-AMG GT3 Evo	Mercedes-AMG M159 6.2 L V8	10	(United States) Scott Noble	Am	2
(Switzerland) Fach Auto Tech	Porsche 911 GT3 R (992.2)	Porsche M97/80 4.2 L Flat-6	11	(Switzerland) Alexander Fach Jr.	PA	All
(Switzerland) Fach Auto Tech	Porsche 911 GT3 R (992.2)	Porsche M97/80 4.2 L Flat-6	11	(Germany) Alexander Schwarzer	PA	1–2, 4–8
(Switzerland) Fach Auto Tech	Porsche 911 GT3 R (992.2)	Porsche M97/80 4.2 L Flat-6	11	(Germany) Lucas Wolf	PA	3
(Switzerland) Fach Auto Tech	Porsche 911 GT3 R (992.2)	Porsche M97/80 4.2 L Flat-6	12	(Germany) Lucas Wolf	Am	2, 6
(Switzerland) Fach Auto Tech	Porsche 911 GT3 R (992.2)	Porsche M97/80 4.2 L Flat-6	12	(Dominican Republic) Joel Monegro Reyes	Am	All
(Switzerland) Fach Auto Tech	Porsche 911 GT3 R (992.2)	Porsche M97/80 4.2 L Flat-6	12	(Germany) Constantin Dressler	Am	7
(Switzerland) Fach Auto Tech	Porsche 911 GT3 R (992.2)	Porsche M97/80 4.2 L Flat-6	12	(Germany) Thomas Kiefer	Am	8
(Poland) Good Speed Racing Team	Aston Martin Vantage AMR GT3 Evo	Aston Martin M177 4.0 L Turbo V8	14	(Poland) Piotr Wira	Am	1–5, 7–8
(Poland) Good Speed Racing Team	Aston Martin Vantage AMR GT3 Evo	Aston Martin M177 4.0 L Turbo V8	14	(Poland) Tomasz Magdziarz	Am	2–4
(Poland) Good Speed Racing Team	Aston Martin Vantage AMR GT3 Evo	Aston Martin M177 4.0 L Turbo V8	14	(Czech Republic) Denis Waszek	Am	7–8
(Germany) Rinaldi Racing	Ferrari 296 GT3 Evo	Ferrari F163CE 3.0 L Turbo V6	15	(Italy) Alessandro Balzan	P	5
(Germany) Rinaldi Racing	Ferrari 296 GT3 Evo	Ferrari F163CE 3.0 L Turbo V6	15	(United States) Dylan Medler	P	5
(Italy) AF Corse	Ferrari 296 GT3 1–3; Ferrari 296 GT3 Evo 4–8	Ferrari F163CE 3.0 L Turbo V6	16	(Brazil) Marcelo Hahn	Am	All
(Italy) AF Corse	Ferrari 296 GT3 1–3; Ferrari 296 GT3 Evo 4–8	Ferrari F163CE 3.0 L Turbo V6	16	(Brazil) Galid Osman	Am	All
(Italy) AF Corse	Ferrari 296 GT3 Evo	Ferrari F163CE 3.0 L Turbo V6	51	(Spain) Rafael Durán	P	All
(Italy) AF Corse	Ferrari 296 GT3 Evo	Ferrari F163CE 3.0 L Turbo V6	51	(Italy) Tommaso Mosca	P	1–4, 6–8
(Italy) AF Corse	Ferrari 296 GT3 Evo	Ferrari F163CE 3.0 L Turbo V6	51	(South Africa) David Perel	P	5
(Italy) AF Corse	Ferrari 296 GT3 Evo	Ferrari F163CE 3.0 L Turbo V6	55	(Monaco) Vincent Abril	PA	1–5, 7
(Italy) AF Corse	Ferrari 296 GT3 Evo	Ferrari F163CE 3.0 L Turbo V6	55	(Belgium) Laurent de Meeus	PA	1–5, 7
(Italy) AF Corse	Ferrari 296 GT3 Evo	Ferrari F163CE 3.0 L Turbo V6	96	(Ukraine) Yaroslav Veselaho	P	All
(Italy) AF Corse	Ferrari 296 GT3 Evo	Ferrari F163CE 3.0 L Turbo V6	96	(France) Thomas Neubauer	P	1, 4, 8
(Italy) AF Corse	Ferrari 296 GT3 Evo	Ferrari F163CE 3.0 L Turbo V6	96	(Italy) Lorenzo Ferrari	P	3, 5–7
(Italy) AF Corse	Ferrari 296 GT3 Evo	Ferrari F163CE 3.0 L Turbo V6	96	(China) Ye Yifei	P	2
(Italy) AF Corse	Ferrari 296 GT3 Evo	Ferrari F163CE 3.0 L Turbo V6	107	(United States) Rey Acosta	Am	4, 7
(Italy) AF Corse	Ferrari 296 GT3 Evo	Ferrari F163CE 3.0 L Turbo V6	107	(Italy) Marco Bonanomi	Am	4, 7
(Italy) Double TT Racing	Ferrari 296 GT3 Evo	Ferrari F163CE 3.0 L Turbo V6	62	(Italy) Leonardo Colavita	P	6, 8
(Italy) Double TT Racing	Ferrari 296 GT3 Evo	Ferrari F163CE 3.0 L Turbo V6	62	(Belgium) Gilles Renmans	P	6, 8
(Japan) Norik Racing	Ferrari 296 GT3 1, 3 Ferrari 296 GT3 Evo 5, 7–8	Ferrari F163CE 3.0 L Turbo V6	81	(United Kingdom) Charlie Fagg	PA	1, 3, 5, 7–8
(Japan) Norik Racing	Ferrari 296 GT3 1, 3 Ferrari 296 GT3 Evo 5, 7–8	Ferrari F163CE 3.0 L Turbo V6	81	(Japan) Norikazu Shibata	PA	1, 3, 5, 7–8
(United Kingdom) Elite Motorsport with Entire Race Engineering	Ferrari 296 GT3 Evo	Ferrari F163CE 3.0 L Turbo V6	17	(United Kingdom) Tom Emson	P	All
(United Kingdom) Elite Motorsport with Entire Race Engineering	Ferrari 296 GT3 Evo	Ferrari F163CE 3.0 L Turbo V6	17	(United Kingdom) Tom Lebbon	P	All
(Italy) Dinamic GT	Porsche 911 GT3 R (992.2)	Porsche M97/80 4.2 L Flat-6	18	(Germany) Christian Engelhart	PA	1
(Italy) Dinamic GT	Porsche 911 GT3 R (992.2)	Porsche M97/80 4.2 L Flat-6	18	(Austria) Philipp Sager	PA	1
(United Kingdom) Optimum Motorsport	McLaren 720S GT3 Evo	McLaren M840T 4.0 L Turbo V8	23	(United States) Ford Koch	P	8
(United Kingdom) Optimum Motorsport	McLaren 720S GT3 Evo	McLaren M840T 4.0 L Turbo V8	23	(United Kingdom) Joe Osborne	P	8
(United Kingdom) Optimum Motorsport	McLaren 720S GT3 Evo	McLaren M840T 4.0 L Turbo V8	27	(United Kingdom) Ben Barnicoat	PA	2
(United Kingdom) Optimum Motorsport	McLaren 720S GT3 Evo	McLaren M840T 4.0 L Turbo V8	27	(United Kingdom) Morgan Tillbrook	PA	2
(United Kingdom) Greystone GT	McLaren 720S GT3 Evo	McLaren M840T 4.0 L Turbo V8	24	Andrey Borodin	PA	1–2, 4–8
(United Kingdom) Greystone GT	McLaren 720S GT3 Evo	McLaren M840T 4.0 L Turbo V8	24	(United Kingdom) Oliver Webb	PA	1–2, 4–8
(United Kingdom) Greystone GT	McLaren 720S GT3 Evo	McLaren M840T 4.0 L Turbo V8	33	(United Kingdom) Zac Meakin	P	All
(United Kingdom) Greystone GT	McLaren 720S GT3 Evo	McLaren M840T 4.0 L Turbo V8	33	(United Kingdom) Dean MacDonald	P	1–4, 6–8
(United Kingdom) Greystone GT	McLaren 720S GT3 Evo	McLaren M840T 4.0 L Turbo V8	33	(United Kingdom) Joseph Loake	P	5
(United Kingdom) Greystone GT	McLaren 720S GT3 Evo	McLaren M840T 4.0 L Turbo V8	44	(United Kingdom) McKenzy Cresswell	P	2, 6, 8
(United Kingdom) Greystone GT	McLaren 720S GT3 Evo	McLaren M840T 4.0 L Turbo V8	44	(Australia) Jayden Kelly	P	2
(United Kingdom) Greystone GT	McLaren 720S GT3 Evo	McLaren M840T 4.0 L Turbo V8	44	(Spain) Alejandro Geppert	P	6
(United Kingdom) Greystone GT	McLaren 720S GT3 Evo	McLaren M840T 4.0 L Turbo V8	44	(United Kingdom) Callum Davies	P	8
(United Arab Emirates) Into Africa Racing by Dragon Racing	Ferrari 296 GT3 1–3, 5 Ferrari 296 GT3 Evo 7	Ferrari F163CE 3.0 L Turbo V6	25	(South Africa) Xolile Letlaka	PA	1–3, 5, 7
(United Arab Emirates) Into Africa Racing by Dragon Racing	Ferrari 296 GT3 1–3, 5 Ferrari 296 GT3 Evo 7	Ferrari F163CE 3.0 L Turbo V6	25	(Zimbabwe) Axcil Jefferies	PA	1, 3, 5
(United Arab Emirates) Into Africa Racing by Dragon Racing	Ferrari 296 GT3 1–3, 5 Ferrari 296 GT3 Evo 7	Ferrari F163CE 3.0 L Turbo V6	25	(South Africa) Stuart White	PA	2, 7
(Oman) Al Manar by Dragon Racing	Ferrari 296 GT3 Evo	Ferrari F163CE 3.0 L Turbo V6	707	(Oman) Al Faisal Al Zubair	P	3, 5, 7
(Oman) Al Manar by Dragon Racing	Ferrari 296 GT3 Evo	Ferrari F163CE 3.0 L Turbo V6	707	(Italy) David Fumanelli	P	3
(Oman) Al Manar by Dragon Racing	Ferrari 296 GT3 Evo	Ferrari F163CE 3.0 L Turbo V6	707	(United Kingdom) Ben Tuck	P	5
(Oman) Al Manar by Dragon Racing	Ferrari 296 GT3 Evo	Ferrari F163CE 3.0 L Turbo V6	707	(Germany) Dennis Marschall	P	7
(France) Saintéloc Racing	Audi R8 LMS Evo II	Audi DAR 5.2 L V10	26	(France) Michael Blanchemain	PA	All
(France) Saintéloc Racing	Audi R8 LMS Evo II	Audi DAR 5.2 L V10	26	(France) Jim Pla	PA	All
(Germany) Team Motopark	Mercedes-AMG GT3 Evo	Mercedes-AMG M159 6.2 L V8	28	(Austria) Dominik Baumann	P	All
(Germany) Team Motopark	Mercedes-AMG GT3 Evo	Mercedes-AMG M159 6.2 L V8	28	(Mexico) Marcelo Ramírez	P	All
(Germany) Team Motopark	Mercedes-AMG GT3 Evo	Mercedes-AMG M159 6.2 L V8	71	(Germany) Maximilian Götz	P	All
(Germany) Team Motopark	Mercedes-AMG GT3 Evo	Mercedes-AMG M159 6.2 L V8	71	(Australia) Christian Mansell	P	All
(Germany) Team Motopark	Mercedes-AMG GT3 Evo	Mercedes-AMG M159 6.2 L V8	89	(Netherlands) Yelmer Buurman	PA	8
(Germany) Team Motopark	Mercedes-AMG GT3 Evo	Mercedes-AMG M159 6.2 L V8	89	(Netherlands) Nigel Schoonderwoerd	PA	8
(Germany) Team Motopark	Mercedes-AMG GT3 Evo	Mercedes-AMG M159 6.2 L V8	99	(Russia) Nikita Mazepin	P	6–8
(Germany) Team Motopark	Mercedes-AMG GT3 Evo	Mercedes-AMG M159 6.2 L V8	99	(France) César Gazeau	P	7–8
(Germany) Team Motopark	Mercedes-AMG GT3 Evo	Mercedes-AMG M159 6.2 L V8	99	(Netherlands) Lin Hodenius	P	6
(Italy) Target Racing	Ferrari 296 GT3	Ferrari F163CE 3.0 L Turbo V6	39	(China) Han Huilin	Am	3
(Germany) CBRX by SPS	Mercedes-AMG GT3 Evo	Mercedes-AMG M159 6.2 L V8	54	(Switzerland) Yannick Mettler	PA	All
(Germany) CBRX by SPS	Mercedes-AMG GT3 Evo	Mercedes-AMG M159 6.2 L V8	54	(Switzerland) Dexter Müller	PA	All
(Italy) Scuderia Villorba Corse	Lamborghini Huracán GT3 Evo 2	Lamborghini DGF 5.2 L V10	63	(Italy) Leonardo Moncini	P	2–8
(Italy) Scuderia Villorba Corse	Lamborghini Huracán GT3 Evo 2	Lamborghini DGF 5.2 L V10	63	(Portugal) Rodrigo Testa	P	2–8
(Italy) FAEMS Team - Nova Race by Ebimotors	BMW M4 GT3 Evo	BMW P58 3.0 L Turbo I6	66	(Italy) Giuseppe Forenzi	P	7
(Italy) FAEMS Team - Nova Race by Ebimotors	BMW M4 GT3 Evo	BMW P58 3.0 L Turbo I6	66	(Guatemala) Ian Rodríguez	P	7
(Poland) Förch Racing by Atlas Ward	Porsche 911 GT3 R (992.2)	Porsche M97/80 4.2 L Flat-6	67	(Poland) Jakub Dwernicki	Am	6–8
(Poland) Förch Racing by Atlas Ward	Porsche 911 GT3 R (992.2)	Porsche M97/80 4.2 L Flat-6	67	(Poland) Tomasz Magdziarz	Am	6–8
(Germany) Leipert Motorsport	Lamborghini Huracán GT3 Evo 2	Lamborghini DGF 5.2 L V10	70	(New Zealand) Brendon Leitch	P	7
(Germany) Leipert Motorsport	Lamborghini Huracán GT3 Evo 2	Lamborghini DGF 5.2 L V10	70	(Australia) Nicolas Stati	P	7
(Czech Republic) Team ISR	Audi R8 LMS Evo II	Audi DAR 5.2 L V10	75	(Czech Republic) Libor Milota	PA	All
(Czech Republic) Team ISR	Audi R8 LMS Evo II	Audi DAR 5.2 L V10	75	(Czech Republic) Filip Salaquarda	PA	All
(Germany) Grupo Prom Racing Team	Mercedes-AMG GT3 Evo	Mercedes-AMG M159 6.2 L V8	77	(Mexico) Alfredo Hernández Ortega	Am	All
(Germany) Grupo Prom Racing Team	Mercedes-AMG GT3 Evo	Mercedes-AMG M159 6.2 L V8	77	(France) Stéphane Tribaudini	Am	2, 7
(Poland) Sendom Racing Team	Lamborghini Huracán GT3 Evo 2	Lamborghini DGF 5.2 L V10	79	(Poland) Seweryn Mazur	Am	1, 3–6, 8
(Portugal) AF Motorsport	Porsche 911 GT3 R (991.2)	Porsche M97/80 4.0 L Flat-6	80	(Portugal) André Fernandes	Am	1–2
(Portugal) AF Motorsport	Porsche 911 GT3 R (991.2)	Porsche M97/80 4.0 L Flat-6	80	(Venezuela) Angelo Fontana	Am	1–2
(United Kingdom) Track Focused	McLaren 720S GT3 Evo	McLaren M840T 4.0 L Turbo V8	88	(United Kingdom) James Kell	PA	1–4, 6–8
(United Kingdom) Track Focused	McLaren 720S GT3 Evo	McLaren M840T 4.0 L Turbo V8	88	(United Kingdom) Darren Kell	PA	1–4, 6–8
(United Kingdom) Track Focused	McLaren 720S GT3 Evo	McLaren M840T 4.0 L Turbo V8	88	(United Kingdom) Darren Kell	Am	5
(United Kingdom) Blackthorn	Aston Martin Vantage AMR GT3 Evo	Aston Martin M177 4.0 L Turbo V8	97	(United Kingdom) Charles Bateman	PA	1–2, 4–8
(United Kingdom) Blackthorn	Aston Martin Vantage AMR GT3 Evo	Aston Martin M177 4.0 L Turbo V8	97	(Portugal) Henrique Chaves	PA	1, 7–8
(United Kingdom) Blackthorn	Aston Martin Vantage AMR GT3 Evo	Aston Martin M177 4.0 L Turbo V8	97	(United Kingdom) Jonny Adam	PA	2, 5–6
(United Kingdom) Blackthorn	Aston Martin Vantage AMR GT3 Evo	Aston Martin M177 4.0 L Turbo V8	97	(Belgium) Kobe Pauwels	PA	4
(Italy) Iron Lynx	Mercedes-AMG GT3 Evo	Mercedes-AMG M159 6.2 L V8	108	(Denmark) Theodor Jensen	PA	2
(Italy) Iron Lynx	Mercedes-AMG GT3 Evo	Mercedes-AMG M159 6.2 L V8	108	(Zimbabwe) Ameerh Naran	PA	2
(Denmark) Mikkel O. Pedersen Racing	Porsche 911 GT3 R (992.2)	Porsche M97/80 4.2 L Flat-6	117	(Denmark) Lars Pedersen	PA	2, 5, 7–8
(Denmark) Mikkel O. Pedersen Racing	Porsche 911 GT3 R (992.2)	Porsche M97/80 4.2 L Flat-6	117	(Denmark) Mikkel O. Pedersen	PA	2, 5, 7–8
(Italy) Auto Sport Racing	Lamborghini Huracán GT3 Evo 2	Lamborghini DGF 5.2 L V10	180	(Germany) Michael Fischbaum	PA	7
(Italy) Auto Sport Racing	Lamborghini Huracán GT3 Evo 2	Lamborghini DGF 5.2 L V10	180	(Serbia) Miloš Pavlović	PA	7
(Slovakia) Gamota Racing	BMW M4 GT3 Evo	BMW P58 3.0 L Turbo I6	500	(Hungary) Csaba Walter	Am	4
(Slovakia) Gamota Racing	BMW M4 GT3 Evo	BMW P58 3.0 L Turbo I6	500	(Slovakia) Antal Zsigo	Am	4
(Spain) SMC Motorsport	McLaren 720S GT3 Evo	McLaren M840T 4.0 L Turbo V8	770	(Spain) Alejandro Geppert	P	8
(Spain) SMC Motorsport	McLaren 720S GT3 Evo	McLaren M840T 4.0 L Turbo V8	770	(Germany) Ben Dörr	P	8
(Italy) ZRS Motorsport	Porsche 911 GT3 R (992.2)	Porsche M97/80 4.2 L Flat-6	911	(Italy) Pietro Armanni	P	All
(Italy) ZRS Motorsport	Porsche 911 GT3 R (992.2)	Porsche M97/80 4.2 L Flat-6	911	(Switzerland) Alex Fontana	P	1, 3–8
(Italy) ZRS Motorsport	Porsche 911 GT3 R (992.2)	Porsche M97/80 4.2 L Flat-6	911	(Austria) Norbert Siedler	P	2

Icon	Class
P	Pro Cup
PA	Pro-Am Cup
Am	Am Cup

- Reigning champion Levente Révész was scheduled to compete for Team Motopark at Spa, but withdrew before the weekend.

== Race results ==
Bold indicates overall winner. In the Pole Position column, bold indicates the driver who set the qualifying lap.

Round		Circuit	Pole position	Pro Winner	Pro-Am Winner	Am Winner
1	R1	(Portugal) Algarve International Circuit	(Italy) No. 911 ZRS Motorsport	**(Italy) No. 911 ZRS Motorsport**	(Switzerland) No. 11 Fach Auto Tech	(Austria) No. 6 Baron Motorsport Team
1	R1	(Portugal) Algarve International Circuit	(Italy) Pietro Armanni **(Switzerland) Alex Fontana**	**(Italy) Pietro Armanni** **(Switzerland) Alex Fontana**	(Switzerland) Alexander Fach Jr. (Mexico) Alexander Schwarzer	(Poland) Adrian Lewandowski (Poland) Andrzej Lewandowski
1	R2	(Portugal) Algarve International Circuit	(United Kingdom) No. 33 Greystone GT	**(United Kingdom) No. 33 Greystone GT**	(United Kingdom) No. 97 Blackthorn	(Italy) No. 16 AF Corse
1	R2	(Portugal) Algarve International Circuit	**(United Kingdom) Dean MacDonald** (United Kingdom) Zac Meakin	**(United Kingdom) Dean MacDonald** **(United Kingdom) Zac Meakin**	(United Kingdom) Charles Bateman (Portugal) Henrique Chaves	(Brazil) Marcelo Hahn (Brazil) Galid Osman
2		(Belgium) Circuit de Spa-Francorchamps	(Germany) No. 71 Team Motopark	**(Germany) No. 71 Team Motopark**	(Switzerland) No. 11 Fach Auto Tech	(Switzerland) No. 12 Fach Auto Tech
2		(Belgium) Circuit de Spa-Francorchamps	(Germany) Maximilian Götz (Australia) Christian Mansell	**(Germany) Maximilian Götz** **(Australia) Christian Mansell**	(Switzerland) Alexander Fach Jr. (Mexico) Alexander Schwarzer	(Dominican Republic) Joel Monegro Reyes (Germany) Lucas Wolf
3	R1	(Italy) Misano World Circuit	(United Kingdom) No. 33 Greystone GT	**(United Kingdom) No. 17 Elite Motorsport with Entire Race Engineering**	(Switzerland) No. 11 Fach Auto Tech	(Switzerland) No. 12 Fach Auto Tech
3	R1	(Italy) Misano World Circuit	**(United Kingdom) Dean MacDonald** (United Kingdom) Zac Meakin	**(United Kingdom) Tom Emson** **(United Kingdom) Tom Lebbon**	(Switzerland) Alexander Fach Jr. (Germany) Lucas Wolf	(Dominican Republic) Joel Monegro Reyes
3	R2	(Italy) Misano World Circuit	(United Kingdom) No. 17 Elite Motorsport with Entire Race Engineering	**(United Kingdom) No. 17 Elite Motorsport with Entire Race Engineering**	(Switzerland) No. 11 Fach Auto Tech	(Poland) No. 14 Good Speed Racing Team
3	R2	(Italy) Misano World Circuit	(United Kingdom) Tom Emson **(United Kingdom) Tom Lebbon**	**(United Kingdom) Tom Emson** **(United Kingdom) Tom Lebbon**	(Switzerland) Alexander Fach Jr. (Germany) Lucas Wolf	(Poland) Tomasz Magdziarz (Poland) Piotr Wira
4	R1	(Hungary) Hungaroring	(Switzerland) No. 11 Fach Auto Tech	**(Italy) No. 911 ZRS Motorsport**	(Italy) No. 55 AF Corse	(Italy) No. 16 AF Corse
4	R1	(Hungary) Hungaroring	**(Switzerland) Alexander Fach Jr.** (Germany) Alexander Schwarzer	**(Italy) Pietro Armanni** **(Switzerland) Alex Fontana**	(Monaco) Vincent Abril (Belgium) Laurent de Meeus	(Brazil) Marcelo Hahn (Brazil) Galid Osman
4	R2	(Hungary) Hungaroring	(United Kingdom) No. 17 Elite Motorsport with Entire Race Engineering	**(United Kingdom) No. 17 Elite Motorsport with Entire Race Engineering**	(Czech Republic) No. 75 Team ISR	(Poland) No. 5 Olimp Racing
4	R2	(Hungary) Hungaroring	**(United Kingdom) Tom Emson** (United Kingdom) Tom Lebbon	**(United Kingdom) Tom Emson** **(United Kingdom) Tom Lebbon**	(Czech Republic) Libor Milota (Czech Republic) Filip Salaquarda	(Poland) Krystian Korzeniowski
5	R1	(France) Circuit Paul Ricard	(United Kingdom) No. 97 Blackthorn	**(Italy) No. 911 ZRS Motorsport**	(United Kingdom) No. 97 Blackthorn	(Austria) No. 6 Baron Motorsport Team
5	R1	(France) Circuit Paul Ricard	**(United Kingdom) Jonny Adam** (United Kingdom) Charles Bateman	**(Italy) Pietro Armanni** **(Switzerland) Alex Fontana**	(United Kingdom) Jonny Adam (United Kingdom) Charles Bateman	(Poland) Adrian Lewandowski (Poland) Andrzej Lewandowski
5	R2	(France) Circuit Paul Ricard	(United Kingdom) No. 17 Elite Motorsport with Entire Race Engineering	**(United Kingdom) No. 17 Elite Motorsport with Entire Race Engineering**	(United Kingdom) No. 97 Blackthorn	(Italy) No. 16 AF Corse
5	R2	(France) Circuit Paul Ricard	(United Kingdom) Tom Emson **(United Kingdom) Tom Lebbon**	**(United Kingdom) Tom Emson** **(United Kingdom) Tom Lebbon**	(United Kingdom) Jonny Adam (United Kingdom) Charles Bateman	(Brazil) Marcelo Hahn (Brazil) Galid Osman
6	R1	(Germany) Hockenheimring	(Italy) No. 63 Scuderia Villorba Corse	**(Italy) No. 63 Scuderia Villorba Corse**	(Germany) No. 54 CBRX by SPS	(Switzerland) No. 12 Fach Auto Tech
6	R1	(Germany) Hockenheimring	**(Italy) Leonardo Moncini** (Portugal) Rodrigo Testa	**(Italy) Leonardo Moncini** **(Portugal) Rodrigo Testa**	(Switzerland) Yannick Mettler (Switzerland) Dexter Müller	(Dominican Republic) Joel Monegro Reyes (Germany) Lucas Wolf
6	R2	(Germany) Hockenheimring	(Italy) No. 911 ZRS Motorsport	**(United Kingdom) No. 17 Elite Motorsport with Entire Race Engineering**	(France) No. 26 Saintéloc Racing	(Poland) No. 67 Förch Racing by Atlas Ward
6	R2	(Germany) Hockenheimring	(Italy) Pietro Armanni **(Switzerland) Alex Fontana**	**(United Kingdom) Tom Emson** **(United Kingdom) Tom Lebbon**	(France) Michael Blanchemain (France) Jim Pla	(Poland) Jakub Dwernicki (Poland) Tomasz Magdziarz
7		(Italy) Autodromo Nazionale di Monza	(Germany) No. 71 Team Motopark	**(Italy) No. 63 Scuderia Villorba Corse**	(United Kingdom) No. 97 Blackthorn	(Switzerland) No. 12 Fach Auto Tech
7		(Italy) Autodromo Nazionale di Monza	(Germany) Maximilian Götz (Australia) Christian Mansell	**(Italy) Leonardo Moncini** **(Portugal) Rodrigo Testa**	(United Kingdom) Charles Bateman (Portugal) Henrique Chaves	(Germany) Constantin Dressler (Dominican Republic) Joel Monegro Reyes
8	R1	(Spain) Circuit de Barcelona-Catalunya	(Germany) No. 71 Team Motopark	**(Germany) No. 71 Team Motopark**	(Switzerland) No. 11 Fach Auto Tech	(Poland) No. 5 Olimp Racing
8	R1	(Spain) Circuit de Barcelona-Catalunya	(Germany) Maximilian Götz **(Australia) Christian Mansell**	**(Germany) Maximilian Götz** **(Australia) Christian Mansell**	(Switzerland) Alexander Fach Jr. (Mexico) Alexander Schwarzer	(Poland) Krystian Korzeniowski
8	R2	(Spain) Circuit de Barcelona-Catalunya	(United Kingdom) No. 33 Greystone GT	**(United Kingdom) No. 33 Greystone GT**	(Poland) No. 777 Olimp Racing	(Poland) No. 5 Olimp Racing
8	R2	(Spain) Circuit de Barcelona-Catalunya	**(United Kingdom) Dean MacDonald** (United Kingdom) Zac Meakin	**(United Kingdom) Dean MacDonald** **(United Kingdom) Zac Meakin**	(Poland) Karol Basz (Poland) Marcin Jedliński	(Poland) Krystian Korzeniowski

== Championship standings ==
=== Points systems ===
Points were awarded to the top 10 (Overall), top 8 (Pro-Am) or top 6 (Am, Teams) classified finishers. If less than 6 participants started the race or if less than 75% of the original race distance was completed, half points were awarded. For the Endurance Race (Spa, Monza) points were multiplied by 2. At the end of the season, the 2 lowest race scores were dropped; if the points dropped were those obtained in endurance races, that counted as 2 races; however, the dropped races could not be the result of disqualification or race bans.

==== Overall ====
Position	1st	2nd	3rd	4th	5th	6th	7th	8th	9th	10th
Points	15	12	10	8	6	5	4	3	2	1

==== Pro-Am ====
Position	1st	2nd	3rd	4th	5th	6th	7th	8th
Points	10	8	6	5	4	3	2	1

==== Am and Teams ====
Position	1st	2nd	3rd	4th	5th	6th
Points	10	8	6	4	3	2

=== Drivers' championship ===
==== Overall ====
Pos.	Driver	Team	(Portugal) ALG		(Belgium) SPA	(Italy) MIS		(Hungary) HUN		(France) LEC		(Germany) HOC		(Italy) MNZ	(Spain) CAT		Pts	Net Points
1	(United Kingdom) Tom Emson (United Kingdom) Tom Lebbon	(United Kingdom) Elite Motorsport with Entire Race Engineering	4	3	2	1	1	25†	1	Ret	1	6	1	4	14	3	148	148
2	(United Kingdom) Zac Meakin	(United Kingdom) Greystone GT	3	1	13	2	2	3	2	Ret	6	2	3	2	3	1	147	147
3	(United Kingdom) Dean MacDonald	(United Kingdom) Greystone GT	3	1	13	2	2	3	2			2	3	2	3	1	142	142
4	(Italy) Pietro Armanni	(Italy) ZRS Motorsport	1	4	Ret	5	3	1	10	1	3	3	9	3	2	2	136	136
4	(Switzerland) Alex Fontana	(Italy) ZRS Motorsport	1	4		5	3	1	10	1	3	3	9	3	2	2	136	136
5	(Germany) Maximilian Götz (Australia) Christian Mansell	(Germany) Team Motopark	2	2	1	9	Ret	2	5	3	2	8	18	28	1	8	117	117
6	(Italy) Leonardo Moncini (Portugal) Rodrigo Testa	(Italy) Scuderia Villorba Corse			3	16	5	8	7	4	4	1	17	1	16	DNS	94	94
7	(Spain) Rafael Durán	(Italy) AF Corse	17	5	25	11	4	9	3	6	9	4	14	6	9	5	59	59
8	(Italy) Tommaso Mosca	(Italy) AF Corse	17	5	25	11	4	9	3			4	14	6	9	5	52	52
9	(Ukraine) Yaroslav Veselaho	(Italy) AF Corse	7	7	Ret	Ret	9	5	6	5	7	7	6	Ret	4	10	49	49
10	(United Kingdom) McKenzy Cresswell	(United Kingdom) Greystone GT			5							5	2		5	4	44	44
11	(Switzerland) Alexander Fach Jr.	(Switzerland) Fach Auto Tech	6	14	4	4	8	19	12	12	16	Ret	5	14	6	16	38	38
12	(Austria) Dominik Baumann (Mexico) Marcelo Ramírez	(Germany) Team Motopark	5	17	11	21	6	6	17	9	10	9	7	9	28	6	34	34
13	(Mexico) Alexander Schwarzer	(Switzerland) Fach Auto Tech	6	14	4			19	12	12	16	Ret	5		6	16	32	32
14	(Oman) Al Faisal Al Zubair	(Oman) Al Manar by Dragon Racing				6	7			2	5			10			29	29
15	(United Kingdom) Charles Bateman	(United Kingdom) Blackthorn	10	6	6			12	13	7	11	14	12	8	8	19	29	29
16	(France) Thomas Neubauer	(Italy) AF Corse	7	7				5	6						4	10	28	28
17	(Italy) Lorenzo Ferrari	(Italy) AF Corse				Ret	9			5	7	7	6	Ret			21	21
18	(Spain) Alejandro Geppert	(United Kingdom) Greystone GT										5	2				19	19
18	(Spain) Alejandro Geppert	(Spain) SMC Motorsport													10	11	19	19
19	(United Kingdom) Ben Tuck	(Oman) Al Manar by Dragon Racing								2	5						18	18
20	(France) Michael Blanchemain (France) Jim Pla	(France) Saintéloc Racing	9	8	9	Ret	Ret	14	14	Ret	WD	16	4	15	Ret	22	17	17
21	(Czech Republic) Libor Milota (Czech Republic) Filip Salaquarda	(Czech Republic) Team ISR	11	15	16	7	11	7	4	14	15	11	15	12	11	14	16	16
22	(Portugal) Henrique Chaves	(United Kingdom) Blackthorn	10	6										8	8	19	15	15
23	(United Kingdom) Callum Davies	(United Kingdom) Greystone GT													5	4	14	14
24	(Russia) Nikita Mazepin	(Germany) Team Motopark										WD	WD	5	Ret	9	14	14
24	(France) César Gazeau	(Germany) Team Motopark												5	Ret	9	14	14
25	(United Kingdom) Jonny Adam	(United Kingdom) Blackthorn			6					7	11	14	12				14	14
26	(Australia) Jayden Kelly	(United Kingdom) Greystone GT			5												12	12
27	(Germany) Lucas Wolf	(Switzerland) Fach Auto Tech			14	4	8					17	19				11	11
28	(Italy) Leonardo Colavita (Belgium) Gilles Renmans	(Italy) Double TT Racing										12	8		7	7	11	11
29	(Poland) Karol Basz (Poland) Marcin Jedliński	(Poland) Olimp Racing	13	10	8	10	10	11	9	Ret	12	15	11	13	13	12	11	11
30	(United States) Anthony Bartone	(Germany) GetSpeed				3	Ret										10	10
30	(Germany) Fabian Schiller	(Germany) GetSpeed				3	WD										10	10
31	(Switzerland) Yannick Mettler (Switzerland) Dexter Müller	(Germany) CBRX by SPS	8	9	Ret	Ret	Ret	10	8	Ret	13	10	Ret	11	30	18	10	10
32	(Italy) David Fumanelli	(Oman) Al Manar by Dragon Racing				6	7										9	9
33	(Monaco) Vincent Abril (Belgium) Laurent de Meeus	(Italy) AF Corse	Ret	11	Ret	13	Ret	4	16	13	14			Ret			8	8
34	(United Kingdom) Ben Barnicoat (United Kingdom) Morgan Tillbrook	(United Kingdom) Optimum Motorsport			7												8	8
35	(Italy) Giuseppe Forenzi (Guatemala) Ian Rodríguez	(Italy) FAEMS Team - Nova Race by Ebimotors												7			8	8
36	(South Africa) David Perel	(Italy) AF Corse								6	9						7	7
37	(Italy) Alessandro Balzan (United States) Dylan Medler	(Germany) Rinaldi Racing								8	8						6	6
38	(United Kingdom) Joseph Loake	(United Kingdom) Greystone GT								Ret	6						5	5
39	(Poland) Hubert Darmetko (Poland) Fabian Dybionka	(Poland) PTT Racing			10	8	Ret	18	21	11	18						5	5
39	(Poland) Hubert Darmetko (Poland) Fabian Dybionka	(Germany) Schubert Motorsport													20	23	5	5
40	(Germany) Dennis Marschall	(Oman) Al Manar by Dragon Racing												10			2	2
41	(Germany) Ben Dörr	(Spain) SMC Motorsport													10	11	1	1
42	(United Kingdom) Darren Kell	(United Kingdom) Track Focused	12	16	12	DNS	WD	19	Ret	21	25	13	10	16	29	30	1	1
43	(United Kingdom) James Kell	(United Kingdom) Track Focused	12	16	12	DNS	WD	19	Ret			13	10	16	29	30	1	1
44	(South Africa) Xolile Letlaka	(South Africa) Into Africa Racing by Dragon Racing	14	13	17	14	19			10	17			29			1	1
45	(Zimbabwe) Axcil Jefferies	(South Africa) Into Africa Racing by Dragon Racing	14	13		14	19			10	17						1	1
46	(Poland) Krystian Korzeniowski	(Poland) Olimp Racing	21	24	24	19	20	24	11	22	27	20	22	24	17	15	0	0
47	(Poland) Tomasz Magdziarz	(Poland) Good Speed Racing Team			22	17	12	21	22								0	0
47	(Poland) Tomasz Magdziarz	(Poland) Förch Racing by Atlas Ward										21	13	27	26	31	0	0
48	(Belgium) Kobe Pauwels	(United Kingdom) Blackthorn						12	13								0	0
49	(Dominican Republic) Joel Monegro Reyes	(Switzerland) Fach Auto Tech	18	21	14	12	17	15	24	Ret	24	17	19	18	23	29	0	0
50	(Germany) Christian Engelhart (Austria) Philipp Sager	(Italy) Dinamic GT	15	12													0	0
51	(Denmark) Lars Pedersen (Denmark) Mikkel O. Pedersen	(Denmark) Mikkel O. Pedersen Racing			18					16	22			17	12	21	0	0
52	(Poland) Piotr Wira	(Poland) Good Speed Racing Team	20	20	22	17	12	21	22	Ret	Ret			21	18	27	0	0
53	(Brazil) Marcelo Hahn (Brazil) Galid Osman	(Italy) AF Corse	19	18	19	Ret	15	13	20	Ret	19	Ret	Ret	22	25	28	0	0
54	(China) Han Huilin	(Italy) Target Racing				20	13										0	0
55	(Poland) Jakub Dwernicki	(Poland) Förch Racing by Atlas Ward										21	13	27	26	31	0	0
56	(Poland) Adrian Lewandowski	(Austria) Baron Motorsport Team	16	19	20	15	14	17	19	18	20	18	23	Ret	22	25	0	0
57	(Poland) Andrzej Lewandowski	(Austria) Baron Motorsport Team	16	19	20	15	14			18	20			Ret			0	0
58	(United Kingdom) Charlie Fagg (Japan) Norikazu Shibata	(Japan) Norik Racing	WD	WD		18	18			15	21			26	19	17	0	0
59	(Poland) Seweryn Mazur	(Poland) Sendom Racing Team	Ret	DNS		Ret	21	20	15	19	23	Ret	21		21	24	0	0
60	(Denmark) Theodor Jensen (Zimbabwe) Ameerh Naran	(Italy) Iron Lynx			15												0	0
61	(Mexico) Alfredo Hernández Ortega	(Germany) Grupo Prom Racing Team	Ret	25	21	Ret	16	23	25	20	26	19	16	20	27	32	0	0
62	Andrey Borodin (United Kingdom) Oliver Webb	(United Kingdom) Greystone GT	WD	23	26			WD	WD	17	28	Ret	20	25	24	26	0	0
63	(Czech Republic) Denis Waszek	(Poland) Good Speed Racing Team												21	18	27	0	0
64	(South Africa) Stuart White	(South Africa) Into Africa Racing by Dragon Racing			17									29			0	0
65	(Slovakia) Antal Zsigo (Hungary) Csaba Walter	(Slovakia) Gamota Racing						22	18								0	0
66	(Germany) Constantin Dressler	(Switzerland) Fach Auto Tech												18			0	0
67	(Poland) Stanisław Jedliński	(Poland) Olimp Racing	21	24	24	19	20	24	WD	22	27	20	22	24			0	0
68	(Germany) Michael Fischbaum (Serbia) Miloš Pavlović	(Italy) Auto Sport Racing												19			0	0
69	(France) Stéphane Tribaudini	(Germany) Grupo Prom Racing Team			21												0	0
70	(Portugal) André Fernandes (Venezuela) Angelo Fontana	(Portugal) AF Motorsport	22	22	23												0	0
71	(Germany) Thomas Kiefer	(Switzerland) Fach Auto Tech													23	29	0	0
72	(United States) Rey Acosta (Italy) Marco Bonanomi	(Italy) AF Corse						Ret	23					23			0	0
73	(United States) Jason Hart (United States) Scott Noble	(Bahrain) 2 Seas Motorsport			Ret												0	0
74	(New Zealand) Brendon Leitch (Australia) Nicolas Stati	(Germany) Leipert Motorsport												Ret			0	0
75	(China) Ye Yifei	(Italy) AF Corse			Ret												0	0
76	(Austria) Norbert Siedler	(Italy) ZRS Motorsport			Ret												0	0
–	(Netherlands) Lin Hodenius	(Germany) Team Motopark										WD	WD				0	0
Guest drivers ineligible to score points
–	(United States) Ford Koch (United Kingdom) Joe Osborne	(United Kingdom) Optimum Motorsport													Ret	12	–	–
–	(Netherlands) Yelmer Buurman (Netherlands) Nigel Schoonderwoerd	(Germany) Team Motopark													15	20	–	–

==== Pro-Am ====
Pos.	Driver	Team	(Portugal) ALG		(Belgium) SPA	(Italy) MIS		(Hungary) HUN		(France) LEC		(Germany) HOC		(Italy) MNZ	(Spain) CAT		Pts	Net Points
1	(United Kingdom) Charles Bateman	(United Kingdom) Blackthorn	4	1	2			5	5	1	1	4	5	1	2	6	99	99
2	(Switzerland) Alexander Fach Jr.	(Switzerland) Fach Auto Tech	1	8	1	1	1	9	4	4	6	Ret	2	5	1	3	96	96
3	(Czech Republic) Libor Milota (Czech Republic) Filip Salaquarda	(Czech Republic) Team ISR	5	9	9	2	3	2	1	6	5	2	6	3	3	2	80	80
4	(Poland) Karol Basz (Poland) Marcin Jedliński	(Poland) Olimp Racing	7	4	4	4	2	4	3	Ret	2	5	4	4	5	1	82	80
5	(Germany) Alexander Schwarzer	(Switzerland) Fach Auto Tech	1	8	1			9	4	4	6	Ret	2	5	1	3	76	76
6	(Switzerland) Yannick Mettler (Switzerland) Dexter Müller	(Germany) CBRX by SPS	2	3	Ret	Ret	Ret	3	2	Ret	3	1	Ret	2	11	5	64	64
7	(France) Michael Blanchemain (France) Jim Pla	(France) Saintéloc Racing	3	2	5	Ret	Ret	6	6	Ret	WD	6	1	6	Ret	9	48	48
8	(Portugal) Henrique Chaves	(United Kingdom) Blackthorn	4	1										1	2	6	46	46
9	(United Kingdom) Jonny Adam	(United Kingdom) Blackthorn			2					1	1	4	5				45	45
10	(Monaco) Vincent Abril (Belgium) Laurent de Meeus	(Italy) AF Corse	Ret	5	Ret	5	Ret	1	7	5	4			Ret			29	29
11	(United Kingdom) Darren Kell (United Kingdom) James Kell	(United Kingdom) Track Focused	6	10	7	DNS	WD	7	Ret			3	3	7	10	12	25	25
12	(Poland) Hubert Darmetko (Poland) Fabian Dybionka	(Poland) PTT Racing			6	3	Ret	8	8	3	8						23	23
12	(Poland) Hubert Darmetko (Poland) Fabian Dybionka	(Germany) Schubert Motorsport													8	10	23	23
13	(Germany) Lucas Wolf	(Switzerland) Fach Auto Tech				1	1										20	20
14	(South Africa) Xolile Letlaka	(South Africa) Into Africa Racing by Dragon Racing	8	7	10	6	5			2	7			12			20	20
15	(Zimbabwe) Axcil Jefferies	(South Africa) Into Africa Racing by Dragon Racing	8	7		6	5			2	7						20	20
16	(United Kingdom) Charlie Fagg (Japan) Norikazu Shibata	(Japan) Norik Racing	WD	WD		7	4			7	9			11	7	4	17	17
17	(United Kingdom) Ben Barnicoat (United Kingdom) Morgan Tillbrook	(United Kingdom) Optimum Motorsport			3												12	12
18	(Denmark) Lars Pedersen (Denmark) Mikkel O. Pedersen	(Denmark) Mikkel O. Pedersen Racing			11					8	10			8	4	8	10	10
19	(Belgium) Kobe Pauwels	(United Kingdom) Blackthorn						5	5								8	8
20	(Germany) Christian Engelhart (Austria) Philipp Sager	(Italy) Dinamic GT	9	6													3	3
21	Andrey Borodin (United Kingdom) Oliver Webb	(United Kingdom) Greystone GT	WD	11	12			WD	WD	9	11	Ret	7	10	9	11	3	3
22	(Denmark) Theodor Jensen (Zimbabwe) Ameerh Naran	(Italy) Iron Lynx			8												2	2
23	(Germany) Michael Fischbaum (Serbia) Miloš Pavlović	(Italy) Auto Sport Racing												9			0	0
24	(South Africa) Stuart White	(South Africa) Into Africa Racing by Dragon Racing			10									12			0	0
Guest drivers ineligible to score points
–	(Netherlands) Yelmer Buurman (Netherlands) Nigel Schoonderwoerd	(Germany) Team Motopark													6	7	–	–

==== Am ====
Pos.	Driver	Team	(Portugal) ALG		(Belgium) SPA	(Italy) MIS		(Hungary) HUN		(France) LEC		(Germany) HOC		(Italy) MNZ	(Spain) CAT		Pts	Net Points
1	(Dominican Republic) Joel Monegro Reyes	(Switzerland) Fach Auto Tech	2	4	1	1	6	2	8	Ret	4	1	3	1	5	6	97	97
2	(Poland) Adrian Lewandowski	(Austria) Baron Motorsport Team	1	2	3	2	3	3	4	1	2	2	6	Ret	4	3	92	92
3	(Brazil) Marcelo Hahn (Brazil) Galid Osman	(Italy) AF Corse	3	1	2	Ret	4	1	5	Ret	1	Ret	Ret	4	6	5	72	72
4	(Poland) Andrzej Lewandowski	(Austria) Baron Motorsport Team	1	2	3	2	3			1	2			Ret			62	62
5	(Poland) Piotr Wira	(Poland) Good Speed Racing Team	4	3	5	3	1	5	6	Ret	Ret			3	2	4	61	61
6	(Poland) Krystian Korzeniowski	(Poland) Olimp Racing	5	6	7	4	7	8	1	5	7	4	5	6	1	1	53	53
7	(Mexico) Alfredo Hernández Ortega	(Germany) Grupo Prom Racing Team	Ret	7	4	Ret	5	7	9	3	6	3	2	2	8	8	49	49
8	(Poland) Seweryn Mazur	(Poland) Sendom Racing Team	Ret	DNS		Ret	8	4	2	2	3	Ret	4		3	2	44	44
9	(Poland) Tomasz Magdziarz	(Poland) Good Speed Racing Team			5	3	1	5	6								40	40
9	(Poland) Tomasz Magdziarz	(Poland) Förch Racing by Atlas Ward										5	1	7	7	7	40	40
10	(Germany) Lucas Wolf	(Switzerland) Fach Auto Tech			1							1	3				36	36
11	(France) Stéphane Tribaudini	(Germany) Grupo Prom Racing Team			4									2			24	24
12	(Czech Republic) Denis Waszek	(Poland) Good Speed Racing Team												3	2	4	24	24
13	(Poland) Stanisław Jedliński	(Poland) Olimp Racing	5	6	7	4	7	8	WD	5	7	4	5	6			23	23
14	(Germany) Constantin Dressler	(Switzerland) Fach Auto Tech												1			20	20
15	(Poland) Jakub Dwernicki	(Poland) Förch Racing by Atlas Ward										5	1	7	7	7	13	13
16	(China) Han Huilin	(Italy) Target Racing				5	2										11	11
17	(Portugal) André Fernandes (Venezuela) Angelo Fontana	(Portugal) AF Motorsport	6	5	6												9	9
18	(Hungary) Csaba Walter (Slovakia) Antal Zsigo	(Slovakia) Gamota Racing						6	3								8	8
19	(United Kingdom) Darren Kell	(United Kingdom) Track Focused								4	5						7	7
20	(United States) Rey Acosta (Italy) Marco Bonanomi	(Italy) AF Corse						Ret	7					5			6	6
21	(Germany) Thomas Kiefer	(Switzerland) Fach Auto Tech													5	6	5	5
22	(United States) Jason Hart (United States) Scott Noble	(Bahrain) 2 Seas Motorsport			Ret												0	0
