= Pietro Armanni =

Italian racing driver (born 2005)

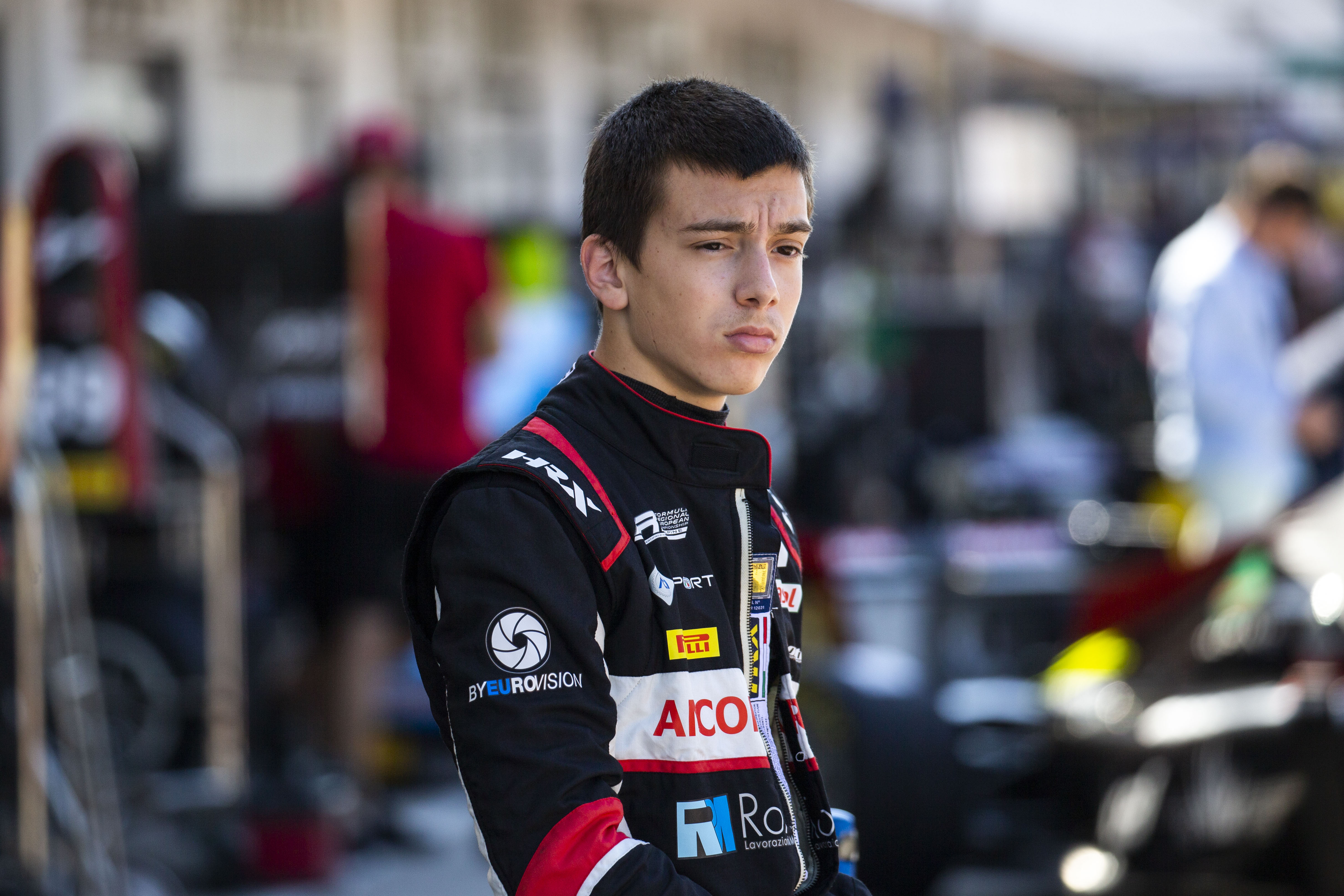
- Armanni in 2022
- Nationality: (Italy) Italian
- Born: 6 October 2005 (age 21) Iseo, Lombardy, Italy

International GT Open career
- Debut season: 2026
- Current team: ZRS Motorsport
- Categorisation: FIA Silver
- Car number: 911
- Starts: 2 (2 entries)
- Wins: 1
- Podiums: 1
- Poles: 0
- Fastest laps: 0
- Best finish: TBD in 2026

Previous series
- 2025 2023–2024 2022 2020–2021: GT Cup Open Europe; Porsche Carrera Cup Italy; FR European Championship; Italian F4 Championship

Pietro Armanni (born 6 October 2005) is an Italian racing driver who races in the International GT Open series. He previously raced for Monolite Racing in the Formula Regional European Championship.

== Early career ==
=== Karting ===
Armanni started karting in 2016. He took part in some Italian and Regional karting championships.

=== Formula 4 ===
==== 2020 ====
In 2020, Armanni made his single-seater debut by competing in the Italian F4 Championship with BVM Racing in the last two rounds of the championship at Imola Circuit and Vallelunga Circuit.

==== 2021 ====
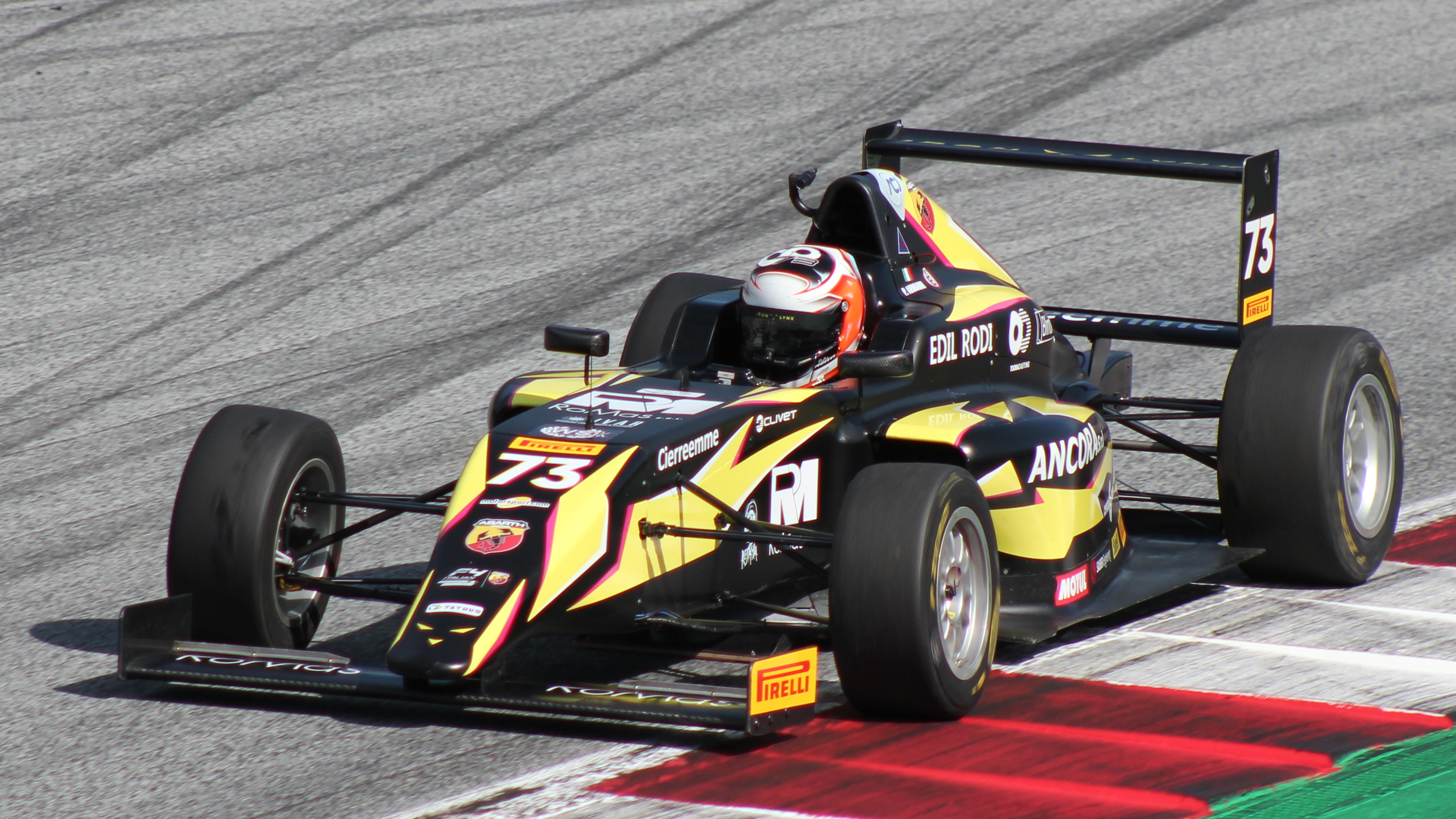
Armanni racing in the 2021 Italian F4 Championship at the Red Bull Ring.

In 2021, Armanni took part in the Italian F4 Championship with Iron Lynx. He competed in the full season, which started at Circuit Paul Ricard and finished at Autodromo Nazionale di Monza. Armanni finished the championship in 28th. The best result he obtained was a seventh place in first race at Imola. He also scored two rookie podiums during the season. He also competed in the opening round of the ADAC Formula 4 Championship at the Red Bull Ring as a guest driver.

=== Formula Regional ===
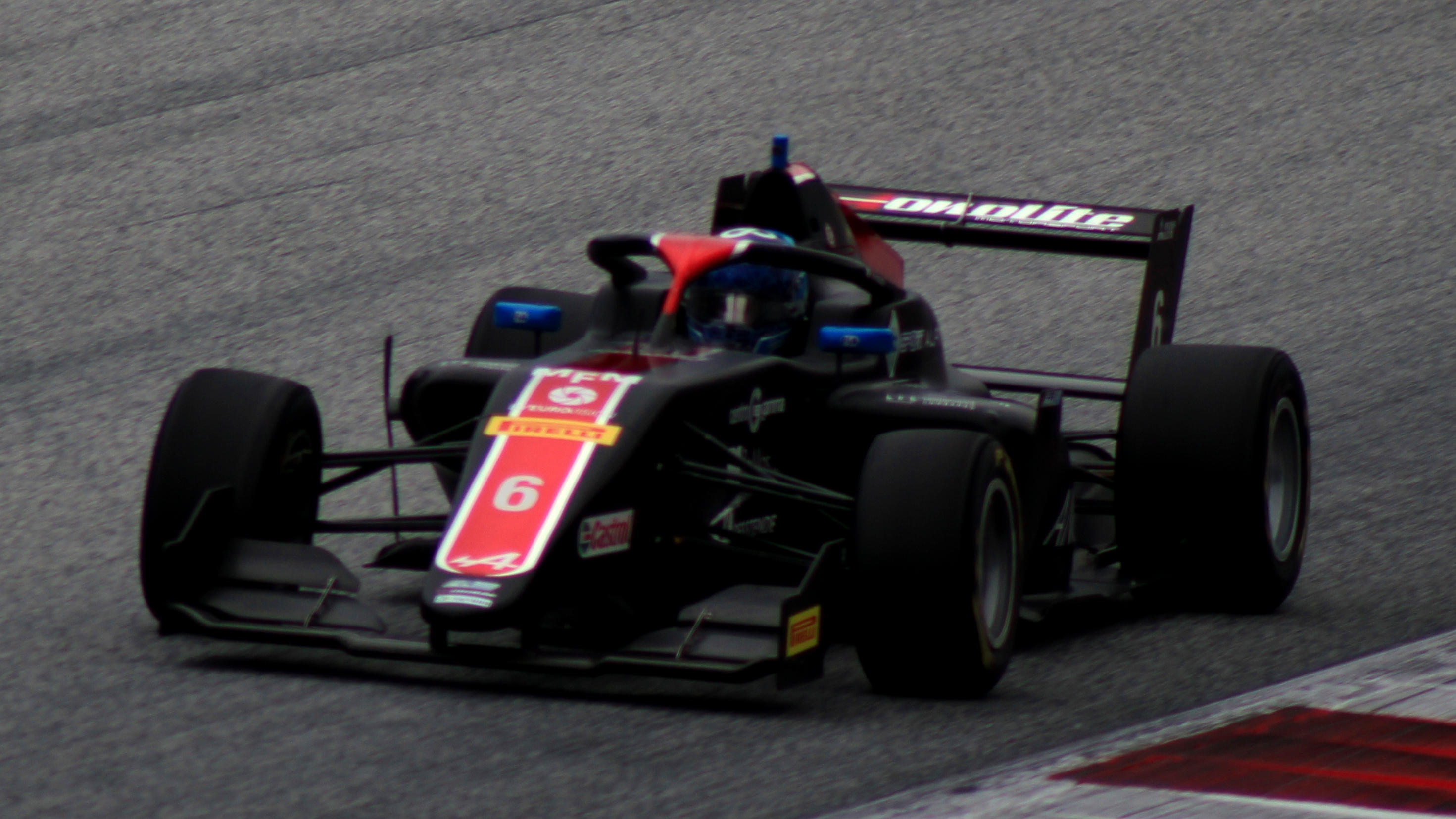
Armanni racing in the 2022 Formula Regional European Championship at the Red Bull Ring.

In 2021, Armanni took part in post-season of the Formula Regional European Championship with DR Formula RP Motorsport.

In 2022, Armanni joined Monolite Racing to compete in the Formula Regional European Championship. He didn't manage to score any points and finished the season in 33rd.

== Sportscar career ==
=== Porsche Cup racing ===
In 2023, Armanni joined Ombra Racing to compete in the Porsche Carrera Cup Italy. He finished 23rd in the standings with a best finish of 11th, achieved at both Imola races. Additionally, Armanni made an appearance in the Porsche Sprint Challenge Suisse, where he finished second during the sprint race and won the endurance race. At the end of the year, Armanni was nominated to be part of the Porsche Carrera Cup Asia shootout.

Armanni entered the Porsche Sprint Challenge Southern Europe at the beginning of 2024. He achieved a best result of fourth in Valencia and ended up 14th overall. During his Porsche Carrera Cup Italy campaign, where he drove for Prima Ghinzani Motorsport, Armanni improved to 18th in the standings. With the same team, Armanni also entered two rounds of the Porsche Supercup.

Heading into 2025, Armanni joined ZRS Motorsport to compete in the Porsche Cup-based GT Cup Open Europe alongside Ludovico Longoni. The pair finished second in the championship.

=== GT3 racing ===
Armanni stepped up to GT3 machinery in 2026, driving for ZRS in the International GT Open series alongside Alex Fontana. After Fontana had taken pole and ended the opening stint of the Algarve season opener in first, Armanni consolidated the gap and drove home to victory in race 1. They finished fourth in race 2.

== Racing record ==
=== Racing career summary ===
Season	Series	Team	Races	Wins	Poles	F/Laps	Podiums	Points	Position
2020	Italian F4 Championship	BVM Racing	6	0	0	0	0	0	40th
2021	Italian F4 Championship	Iron Lynx	21	0	0	0	0	8	28th
2021	ADAC Formula 4 Championship	Iron Lynx	3	0	0	0	0	0	NC†
2022	Formula Regional European Championship	Monolite Racing	19	0	0	0	0	0	33rd
2023	Porsche Carrera Cup Italy	Ombra Racing	12	0	0	0	0	10	23rd
2023	Porsche Carrera Cup Benelux	Ombra Racing	2	0	0	0	0	0	NC†
2023	Porsche Sprint Challenge Suisse	Ombra Racing	2	1	1	1	2	0	NC†
2024	Porsche Sprint Challenge Southern Europe	Ghinzani Arco Motorsport	8	0	0	0	0	39	14th
2024	Porsche Carrera Cup Italy	Prima Ghinzani Motorsport	12	0	0	0	0	20	18th
2024	Porsche Supercup	Prima Ghinzani Motorsport	2	0	0	0	0	0	NC†
2025	GT Cup Open Europe	ZRS Motorsport	12	2	1	2	7	104	**2nd**
2026	International GT Open	ZRS Motorsport	14	3	2	1	9	136	4th
2026	GT World Challenge Europe Endurance Cup	Car Collection Motorsport	1	0	0	0	0	0	NC

=== Complete Italian F4 Championship results ===
(key) (Races in bold indicate pole position) (Races in italics indicate fastest lap)

Year	Team	1	2	3	4	5	6	7	8	9	10	11	12	13	14	15	16	17	18	19	20	21	Pos	Points
2020	BVM Racing	MIS; 1	MIS; 2	MIS; 3	IMO1; 1	IMO1; 2	IMO1; 3	RBR; 1	RBR; 2	RBR; 3	MUG; 1	MUG; 2	MUG; 3	MNZ; 1	MNZ; 2	MNZ; 3	IMO2; 1; 25	IMO2; 2; 17	IMO2; 3; 29	VLL; 1; 27	VLL; 2 C	VLL; 3; 30	40th	0
2021	Iron Lynx	LEC; 1; 34	LEC; 2; 15	LEC; 3; 30	MIS; 1; 26	MIS; 2; 22	MIS; 3; 21	VLL; 1 Ret	VLL; 2 Ret	VLL; 3; 14	IMO; 1; 7	IMO; 2; 9	IMO; 3; 18	RBR; 1; 25	RBR; 2; 23†	RBR; 3; 21	MUG; 1; 23	MUG; 2; 24	MUG; 3; 19	MNZ; 1; 11	MNZ; 2; 18	MNZ; 3; 11	28th	8

=== Complete ADAC Formula 4 Championship results ===
(key) (Races in bold indicate pole position) (Races in italics indicate fastest lap)

Year	Team	1	2	3	4	5	6	7	8	9	10	11	12	13	14	15	16	17	18	Pos	Points
2021	Iron Lynx	RBR; 1 Ret	RBR; 2; 20	RBR; 3 Ret	ZAN; 1	ZAN; 2	ZAN; 3	HOC1; 1	HOC1; 2	HOC1; 3	SAC; 1	SAC; 2	SAC; 3	HOC2; 1	HOC2; 2	HOC2; 3	NÜR; 1	NÜR; 2	NÜR; 3	NC	–

† As Armanni was a guest driver, he was ineligible for points

=== Complete Formula Regional European Championship results ===
(key) (Races in bold indicate pole position) (Races in italics indicate fastest lap)

Year	Team	1	2	3	4	5	6	7	8	9	10	11	12	13	14	15	16	17	18	19	20	DC	Points
2022	Monolite Racing	MNZ; 1; 32†	MNZ; 2 Ret	IMO; 1; 30	IMO; 2; 27	MCO; 1; 21	MCO; 2 DNQ	LEC; 1; 31	LEC; 2; 21	ZAN; 1; 28	ZAN; 2; 31	HUN; 1; 24	HUN; 2; 25	SPA; 1; 31	SPA; 2 Ret	RBR; 1; 30	RBR; 2; 19	CAT; 1; 32†	CAT; 2; 23	MUG; 1; 28	MUG; 2; 24	33rd	0

=== Complete Porsche Carrera Cup Italy results ===
(key) (Races in bold indicate pole position) (Races in italics indicate fastest lap)

Year	Team	1	2	3	4	5	6	7	8	9	10	11	12	DC	Points
2023	Ombra Racing	MIS1; 1; 17	MIS1; 2 Ret	VLL; 1; 16	VLL; 2; 14	MUG; 1	MUG; 2	MNZ; 1; 17	MNZ; 2 Ret	MIS2; 1; 20	MIS2; 2 Ret	IMO; 1; 11	IMO; 2; 11	23rd	10
2024	Prima Ghinzani Motorsport	MIS; 1; 16	MIS; 2; 12	IMO; 1; 13	IMO; 2; 10	MUG; 1; 32	MUG; 2; 16	IMO; 1; 11	IMO; 2; 26	VLL; 1 Ret	VLL; 2; 23	MNZ; 1; 14	MNZ; 2; 16	18th	20

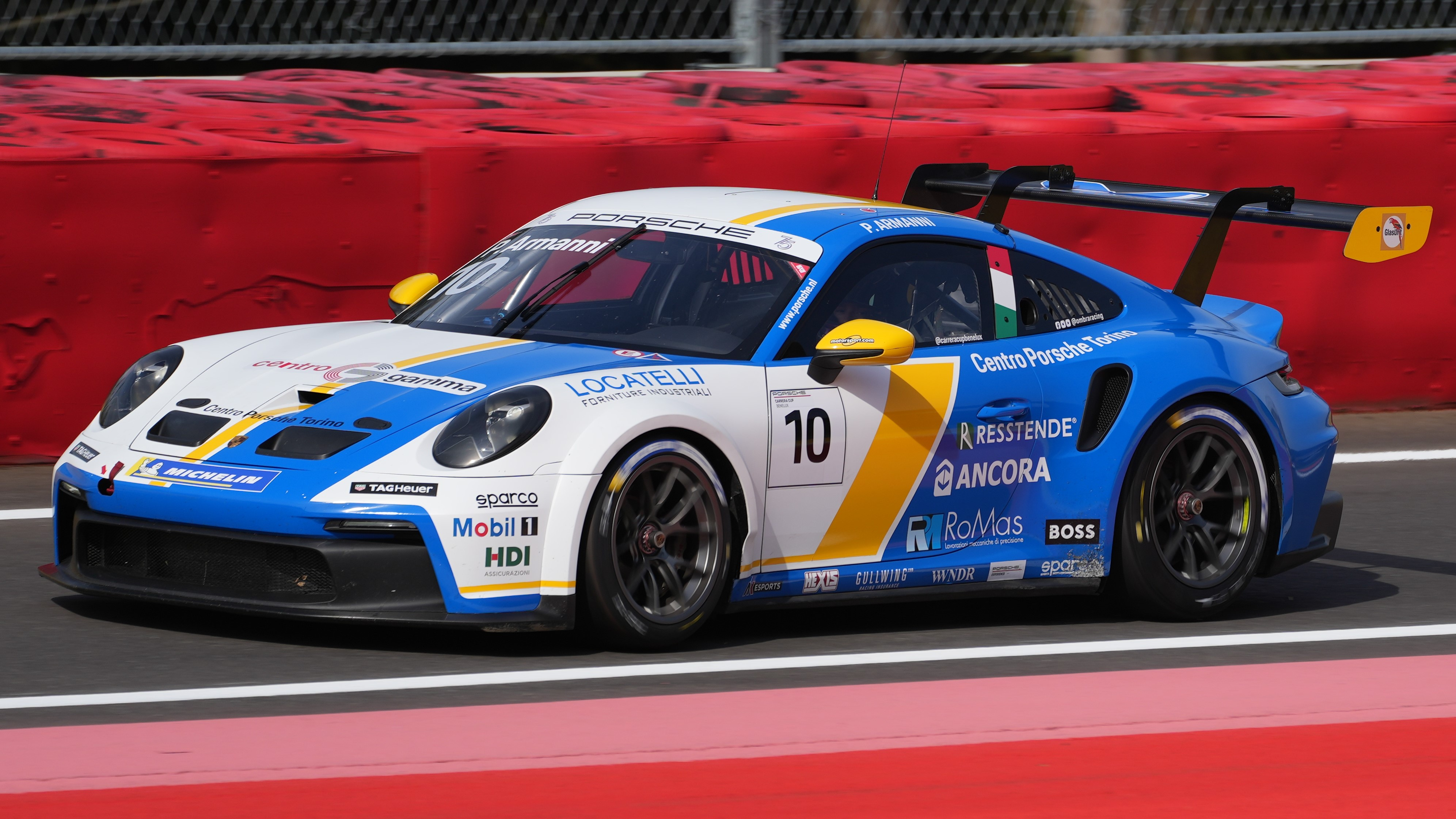
Armanni racing in the 2023 Porsche Carrera Cup Benelux at Circuit de Spa-Francorchamps.
