= Chester Kieffer =

Luxembourger racing driver

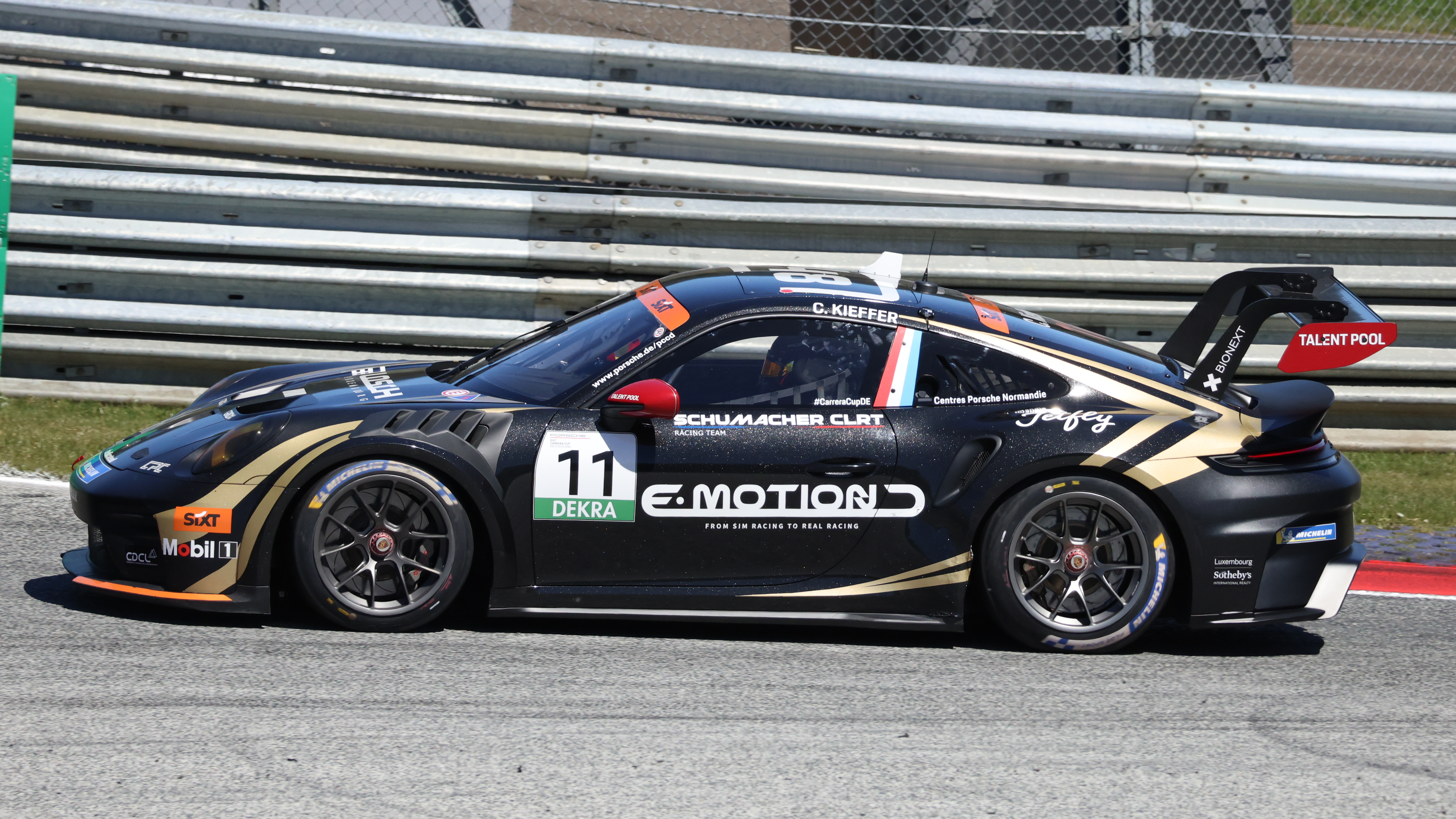
- Kieffer at the Red Bull Ring in 2026
- Nationality: (Luxembourg) Luxembourger
- Born: 23 July 2006 (age 20) Luxembourg City, Luxembourg

Porsche Carrera Cup Germany career
- Debut season: 2026
- Current team: Schumacher CLRT
- Categorisation: FIA Silver
- Car number: 11
- Starts: 14
- Wins: 1
- Podiums: 2
- Poles: 0
- Fastest laps: 2
- Best finish: TBD in 2026

Previous series
- 2025 2025 2024 2024 2024 2024: Porsche Carrera Cup France; Porsche Sprint Challenge Southern Europe; FIA Motorsport Games Formula 4 Cup; F4 British Championship; French F4 Championship; Formula 4 UAE Championship

Chester Kieffer (born 23 July 2006) is a Luxembourgish racing driver who competes in Porsche Supercup and Porsche Carrera Cup Germany for Schumacher CLRT.

== Career ==
Kieffer began karting at age 15 and made his single-seater debut in the 2023 Ultimate Cup Series Challenge Monoplace season finale at Paul Ricard, where he won all three races in the F4 class. Kieffer then contested round three of the 2024 Formula 4 UAE Championship for X GP at the Dubai Autodrome, where his highest result was fifteenth in race one.

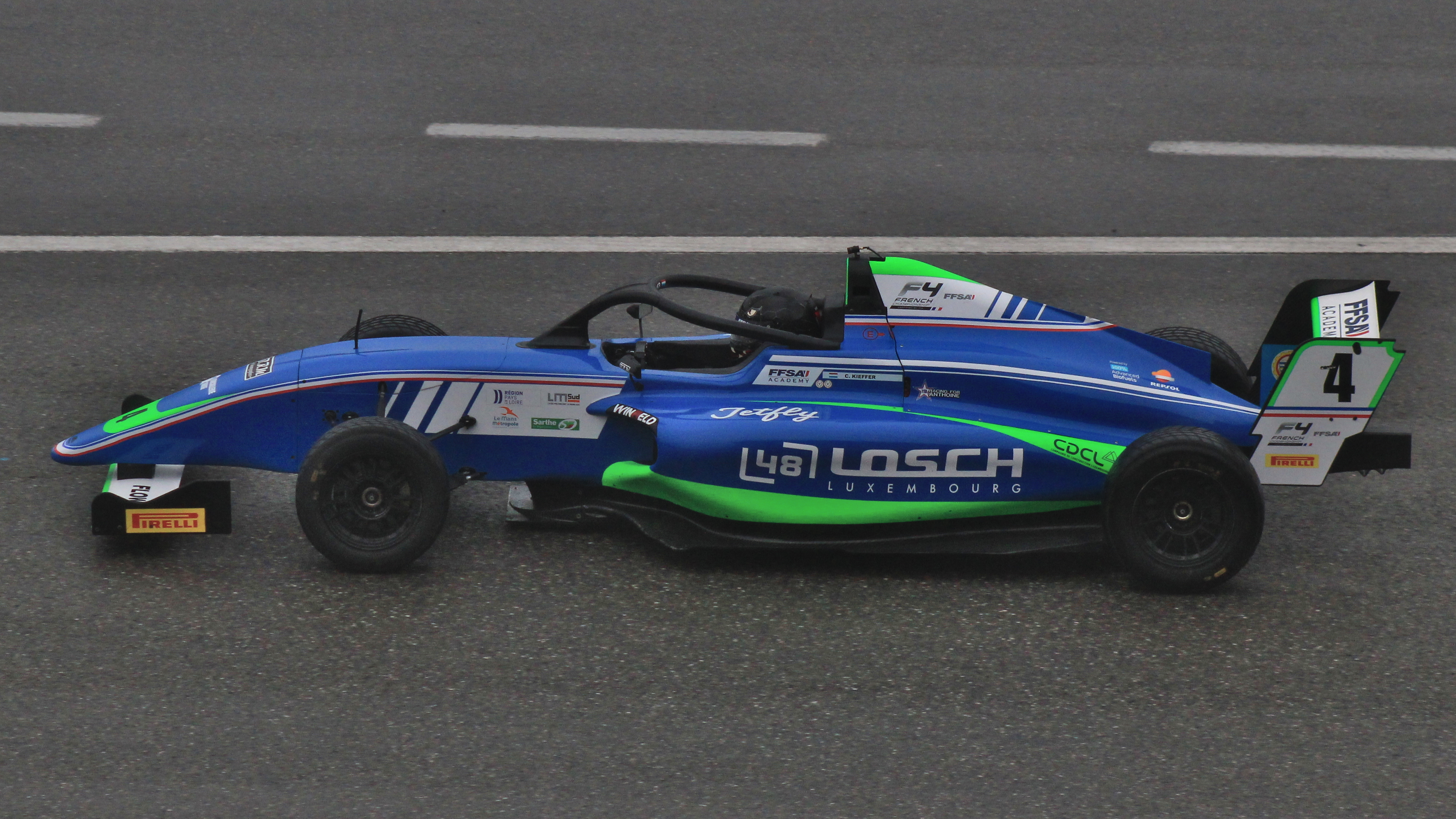
Kieffer driving at the Nürburgring in French F4 in 2024.

Kieffer's main campaign of 2024 was the French F4 Championship, where he received backing from the Winfield Racing School and enjoyed success in the first half of the season. He got his maiden pole position, podium and win in round two at Lédenon and became the first Luxembourger to win an FIA-sanctioned single seater race. He picked up another podium in race three that weekend, before winning again in the next round at the Circuit de Spa-Francorchamps. After that, Kieffer only mustered three points finishes from the last 12 races – a highest of sixth at the Nürburgring. Despite this, Kieffer managed to hang onto fourth in the drivers' championship with 116 points.

Kieffer also made a cameo in round six of the 2024 F4 British Championship with Xcel Motorsport at Zandvoort, the only international round in the season, and scored four bonus points for overtaking four cars on his way to 19th in race two. In late 2024, Kieffer represented Team Luxembourg in the FIA Motorsport Games Formula 4 Cup at Circuit Ricardo Tormo and finished sixth in the main race.

=== Porsche Cup racing ===
In 2025, Kieffer switched from Formula 4 to one-make Porsche racing and kicked off his season in the Porsche Sprint Challenge Southern Europe with CLRT Schumacher, where he claimed two pole positions at Portimão, a podium at Estoril, won the rookie title and finished third in the main championship. Kieffer then competed full-time in the Porsche Carrera Cup France for CLRT Schumacher, scoring his only podium in round three at Circuit de Spa-Francorchamps. Kieffer consistently finished in the top 10 throughout the season, beating Enzo Joulié to the rookie title and ending the overall championship in sixth.

In 2026, Kieffer stayed with Schumacher CLRT to compete in Porsche Carrera Cup Germany and make his Porsche Supercup debut. After a podium at Zandvoort, Kieffer achieved his first PCCD win in the penultimate round at the Nürburgring. In Supercup, Kieffer secured back-to-back second-place finishes at Spa and the Hungaroring, and never finished lower than 10th. He ended the season fourth in the standings, as the rookies' champion.

== Karting record ==
=== Karting career summary ===
Season	Series	Team	Position
2023	IAME Euro Series – X30 Senior	RSD Karting	185th
2023	IAME Warriors Final – X30 Senior	RSD Karting	NC
2023	WSK Champions Cup – X30 Senior	RSD Karting	NC
2023	IAME Euro Series – X30 Senior		115th

== Racing record ==
=== Racing career summary ===
Season	Series	Team	Races	Wins	Poles	F/Laps	Podiums	Points	Position
2023	Ultimate Cup Series Challenge Monoplace - F4	Formula Motorsport	3	3	1	3	3	84	**2nd**
2024	Formula 4 UAE Championship	X GP	3	0	0	0	0	0	29th
2024	French F4 Championship	FFSA Academy	20	2	1	1	3	116	4th
2024	F4 British Championship	Xcel Motorsport	3	0	0	0	0	4	30th
2024	FIA Motorsport Games Formula 4 Cup	Team Luxembourg	2	0	0	0	0	0	6th
2025	Porsche Sprint Challenge Southern Europe	CLRT Schumacher	8	0	2	0	1	78	3rd
2025	Porsche Carrera Cup France	CLRT Schumacher	12	0	0	0	1	127	6th
2025	Nürburgring Langstrecken-Serie – Cup3	AV Racing by Black Falcon	1	0	0	0	0	0	NC†
2026	Porsche Carrera Cup Germany	Schumacher CLRT	16	2	2	2	3	123	8th
2026	Porsche Supercup	Schumacher CLRT	8	0	0	0	2	82	4th

* Season still in progress.

=== Complete Formula 4 UAE Championship results ===
(key) (Races in bold indicate pole position; races in italics indicate fastest lap)

Year	Team	1	2	3	4	5	6	7	8	9	10	11	12	13	14	15	DC	Points
2024	X GP	YMC1; 1	YMC1; 2	YMC1; 3	YMC2; 1	YMC2; 2	YMC2; 3	DUB1; 1; 15	DUB1; 2; 28	DUB1; 3 Ret	YMC3; 1	YMC3; 2	YMC3; 3	DUB2; 1	DUB2; 2	DUB2; 3	29th	0

=== Complete French F4 Championship results ===
(key) (Races in bold indicate pole position; races in italics indicate fastest lap)

Year	1	2	3	4	5	6	7	8	9	10	11	12	13	14	15	16	17	18	19	20	21	DC	Points
2024	NOG; 1; 10	NOG; 2 C	NOG; 3; 5	**LÉD**; **1**; 1	LÉD; 2; 7	LÉD; 3; 2	SPA; 1; 1	SPA; 2; 5	SPA; 3; 4	NÜR; 1 Ret	NÜR; 2; 20	NÜR; 3; 6	MAG; 1; 11	MAG; 2; 10	MAG; 3 Ret	DIJ; 1; 10	DIJ; 2; 12	DIJ; 3; 7	LEC; 1; 15	LEC; 2 Ret	LEC; 3; 14	4th	116

=== Complete F4 British Championship results ===
(key) (Races in bold indicate pole position; races in italics indicate fastest lap)

Year	Team	1	2	3	4	5	6	7	8	9	10	11	12	13	14	15	16	17	18	19	20	21	22	23	24	25	26	27	28	29	30	31	32	DC	Points
2024	Xcel Motorsport	DPN; 1	DPN; 2	DPN; 3	BHI; 1	BHI; 2	BHI; 3	SNE; 1	SNE; 2	SNE; 3	THR; 1	THR; 2	THR; 3	SILGP; 1	SILGP; 2	SILGP; 3	ZAN; 1; 20	ZAN; 2; 19^{4}	ZAN; 3 Ret	KNO; 1	KNO; 2	KNO; 3	DPGP; 1	DPGP; 2	DPGP; 3	DPGP; 4	SILN; 1	SILN; 2	SILN; 3	BHGP; 1	BHGP; 2	BHGP; 3	BHGP; 4	30th	4

=== Complete Porsche Sprint Challenge Southern Europe results ===
(key) (Races in bold indicate pole position) (Races in italics indicate fastest lap)

Year	Team	1	2	3	4	5	6	7	8	Pos	Points	Ref
2025	CLRT Schumacher	**ALG**; **1**; 4	**ALG**; **2**; 5	EST; 1; 7	EST; 2; 3	VAL; 1; 5	VAL; 2; 7	CAT; 1 Ret	CAT; 2; 7	3rd	78	

=== Complete Porsche Carrera Cup France results ===
(key) (Races in bold indicate pole position) (Races in italics indicate fastest lap)

Year	Team	1	2	3	4	5	6	7	8	9	10	11	12	Pos	Points
2025	CLRT Schumacher	BAR; 1; 5	BAR; 2; 7	DIJ; 1; 9	DIJ; 2; 8	SPA; 1; 8	SPA; 2; 3	MIS; 1; 5	MIS; 2; 7	VAL; 1; 5	VAL; 2; 5	LEC; 1; 12	LEC; 2; 4	6th	127

=== Complete Porsche Carrera Cup Germany results ===
(key) (Races in bold indicate pole position) (Races in italics indicate fastest lap)

Year	Team	1	2	3	4	5	6	7	8	9	10	11	12	13	14	15	16	DC	Points
2026	Schumacher CLRT	IMO; 1; 7	IMO; 2 Ret	RBR; 1 Ret	RBR; 2; 16	SPA; 1; 8	SPA; 2; 5	ZAN; 1; 3	ZAN; 2; 12	LAU; 1; 25	LAU; 2 Ret	NOR; 1; 11	NOR; 2; 8	NÜR; 1; 5	NÜR; 2; 1	**HOC**; **1**; 1	**HOC**; **2**; 16	8th	123

=== Complete Porsche Supercup results ===
(key) (Races in bold indicate pole position) (Races in italics indicate fastest lap)

Year	Team	1	2	3	4	5	6	7	8	Pos.	Points
2026	Schumacher CLRT	MON; 10	CAT; 8	RBR; 7	SPA; 2	HUN; 2	ZAN; 1; 4	ZAN; 2 Ret	MNZ; 6	4th	82

^{*} Season still in progress.
