= 2024 GT4 European Series =

Sports car racing series

The 2024 GT4 European Series is the 17th season of the GT4 European Series organised by the SRO Motorsports Group. The season started on 5 April at Circuit Paul Ricard and will end on 30 November at the Jeddah Corniche Circuit.

== Calendar ==
The Calendar for the 2024 season was unveiled on 2 July 2023 during the 2023 24 Hours of Spa. It includes 6 race weekends in support of the 2024 GT World Challenge Europe and a single, non-championship points scoring 6 hour race in October.

Round	Circuit	Date	Supporting
1	Circuit Paul Ricard, Le Castellet, France	5–7 April	GT World Challenge Europe Endurance Cup
2	Misano World Circuit, Misano, Italy	17–19 May	GT World Challenge Europe Sprint Cup
3	Circuit de Spa-Francorchamps, Stavelot, Belgium	27–29 June	GT World Challenge Europe Endurance Cup; Intercontinental GT Challenge
4	Hockenheimring, Hockenheim, Germany	19–21 July	GT World Challenge Europe Sprint Cup
5	Monza Circuit, Monza, Italy	20–22 September	GT World Challenge Europe Endurance Cup
6	Jeddah Corniche Circuit, Jeddah, Saudi Arabia	29–30 November	GT World Challenge Europe Endurance Cup

== Entry list ==
Team	Car	No.	Drivers	Class	Rounds
(Belgium) TeamFloral-Vanspringel	Ford Mustang GT4 (2024)	1	(Belgium) Nathan Vanspringel	S	3–5
(Belgium) TeamFloral-Vanspringel	Ford Mustang GT4 (2024)	1	(Belgium) Frédéric Caprasse	S	3
(Belgium) TeamFloral-Vanspringel	Ford Mustang GT4 (2024)	1	(Belgium) Nico Verdonck	S	4–5
(France) Team Speedcar	Audi R8 LMS GT4 Evo	3	(France) Robert Consani	S	All
(France) Team Speedcar	Audi R8 LMS GT4 Evo	3	(France) Benjamin Lariche	S	All
(France) Team Speedcar	Audi R8 LMS GT4 Evo	300	(France) Nicolas Markiewicz	Am	1, 4–5
(France) Team Speedcar	Audi R8 LMS GT4 Evo	300	(France) Adrien Paviot	Am	1, 4–5
(France) Team Speedcar	Audi R8 LMS GT4 Evo	300	(Belgium) Quentin Denis	PA	3
(France) Team Speedcar	Audi R8 LMS GT4 Evo	300	(Belgium) Florian van Dooren	PA	3
(France) Team Speedcar	Audi R8 LMS GT4 Evo	444	(France) Julien Ripert	Am	All
(France) Team Speedcar	Audi R8 LMS GT4 Evo	444	(France) Philippe Thalamy	Am	All
(France) AV Racing	Porsche 718 Cayman GT4 RS Clubsport	4	(France) Sacha Bottemanne	S 1–3; PA 4–5	All
(France) AV Racing	Porsche 718 Cayman GT4 RS Clubsport	4	(France) Lonni Martins	S 1–3; PA 4–5	All
(France) AV Racing	Porsche 718 Cayman GT4 RS Clubsport	75	(France) Noam Abramczyk	PA	All
(France) AV Racing	Porsche 718 Cayman GT4 RS Clubsport	75	(France) Paul Petit	PA	All
(France) Mirage Racing	Aston Martin Vantage AMR GT4	5	(United Kingdom) Josh Miller	S	1–2
(France) Mirage Racing	Aston Martin Vantage AMR GT4	5	(Netherlands) Ruben del Sarte	S	1–2
(France) Mirage Racing	Aston Martin Vantage AMR GT4 Evo	5	(United Kingdom) Josh Miller	S	3–6
(France) Mirage Racing	Aston Martin Vantage AMR GT4 Evo	5	(Netherlands) Ruben del Sarte	S	3–6
(France) Mirage Racing	Aston Martin Vantage AMR GT4 Evo	7	Stanislav Safronov (Note: Safronov, Vaintrub, Solukovtsev are Russian, but are competing as a neutral competitor as Russian national emblems were banned by the FIA due to the Russian invasion of Ukraine. For the same reason Bulatov races under German license and Ekelchik starts under Armenian license.)	PA	All
(France) Mirage Racing	Aston Martin Vantage AMR GT4 Evo	7	Aleksandr Vaintrub	PA	All
(Italy) Team Promodrive	BMW M4 GT4 Gen II	8	(Finland) Benjamin Sylvestersson	S	2
(Italy) Team Promodrive	BMW M4 GT4 Gen II	8	(Italy) Jody Simone Vullo	S	2
(France) TGR Team Matmut Évolution	Toyota GR Supra GT4 Evo	9	(France) Etienne Cheli	S	All
(France) TGR Team Matmut Évolution	Toyota GR Supra GT4 Evo	9	(Andorra) Enzo Joulié	S	All
(France) TGR Team Matmut Évolution	Toyota GR Supra GT4 Evo	66	(France) Cindy Gudet	PA	All
(France) TGR Team Matmut Évolution	Toyota GR Supra GT4 Evo	66	(Czech Republic) Gabriela Jílková	PA	All
(France) Team CMR	Ginetta G56 GT4 Evo	10	(France) Ethan Gialdini	PA	3
(France) Team CMR	Ginetta G56 GT4 Evo	10	(Belgium) Stéphane Lémeret	PA	3
(France) Team CMR	Ginetta G56 GT4 Evo	56	(France) Loris Cabirou	S	3
(France) Team CMR	Ginetta G56 GT4 Evo	56	(United Kingdom) Freddie Tomlinson	S	3
(France) Team CMR	Ginetta G56 GT4 Evo	229	(France) Hugo Bac	S	3
(France) Team CMR	Ginetta G56 GT4 Evo	229	(France) Hugo Mogica	S	3
(France) AVR-Avvatar	Porsche 718 Cayman GT4 RS Clubsport	110	(France) Julien Piguet	PA	6
(France) AVR-Avvatar	Porsche 718 Cayman GT4 RS Clubsport	110	(France) Alban Varutti	PA	6
(Turkey) Borusan Otomotiv Motorsport	BMW M4 GT4 Gen II	11	(Brazil) Pedro Ebrahim	S	All
(Turkey) Borusan Otomotiv Motorsport	BMW M4 GT4 Gen II	11	(Turkey) Yagiz Gedik	S	All
(Turkey) Borusan Otomotiv Motorsport	BMW M4 GT4 Gen II	12	(Turkey) Berkay Besler	S	All
(Turkey) Borusan Otomotiv Motorsport	BMW M4 GT4 Gen II	12	(Italy) Gabriele Piana	S	All
(United Arab Emirates) Teichmann Continental Racing	Toyota GR Supra GT4 Evo	13	Andrey Solukovtsev	PA	All
(United Arab Emirates) Teichmann Continental Racing	Toyota GR Supra GT4 Evo	13	(Cyprus) Vasily Vladykin	PA	All
(Spain) NM Racing Team	Mercedes AMG GT4	15	(Spain) Lluc Ibáñez	S	All
(Spain) NM Racing Team	Mercedes AMG GT4	15	(United States) Alexandre Papadopulos	S	All
(Spain) NM Racing Team	Mercedes AMG GT4	16	(United States) Andy Cantu	Am	All
(Spain) NM Racing Team	Mercedes AMG GT4	16	(Sri Lanka) Dilantha Malagamuwa	Am	1–2
(Spain) NM Racing Team	Mercedes AMG GT4	16	(Spain) Guillermo Aso	Am	3
(Spain) NM Racing Team	Mercedes AMG GT4	16	(United Kingdom) Charles Dawson	Am	4–6
BMW Team France L'Espace Bienvenue	BMW M4 GT4 Gen II	17	(Netherlands) Ricardo van der Ende	S	All
BMW Team France L'Espace Bienvenue	BMW M4 GT4 Gen II	17	(Belgium) Benjamin Lessennes	S	All
(United Kingdom) Forsetti Motorsport	Aston Martin Vantage AMR GT4 Evo	19	(United Kingdom) Aston Millar	S	3
(United Kingdom) Forsetti Motorsport	Aston Martin Vantage AMR GT4 Evo	19	(United Kingdom) Mikey Porter	S	3
(Germany) EastSide Motorsport	Mercedes AMG GT4	20	(Germany) Denis Bulatov	PA	1–2
(Germany) EastSide Motorsport	Mercedes AMG GT4	20	(Germany) Lukas Mayer	PA	1–2
(United Kingdom) Simpson Teleios Motorsport	BMW M4 GT4 Gen II	21	(United Arab Emirates) Mathieu Detry	PA	3
(United Kingdom) Simpson Teleios Motorsport	BMW M4 GT4 Gen II	21	(United Arab Emirates) Fabian Duffieux	PA	3
(Germany) Allied-Racing	Porsche 718 Cayman GT4 RS Clubsport	22	(Austria) Leo Pichler	S	1–5
(Germany) Allied-Racing	Porsche 718 Cayman GT4 RS Clubsport	22	(Germany) Herolind Nuredini	S	1–4
(Germany) Allied-Racing	Porsche 718 Cayman GT4 RS Clubsport	22	(Morocco) Suleiman Zanfari	S	5
(Germany) Allied-Racing	Porsche 718 Cayman GT4 RS Clubsport	44	(Poland) Maksymilian Angelard	S	1–5
(Germany) Allied-Racing	Porsche 718 Cayman GT4 RS Clubsport	44	(Denmark) Oskar Lind Kristensen	S	1–5
(France) JSB Compétition	Porsche 718 Cayman GT4 RS Clubsport	24	(France) Viny Beltramelli	S	All
(France) JSB Compétition	Porsche 718 Cayman GT4 RS Clubsport	24	(France) Florian Briché	S	All
(France) JSB Compétition	Porsche 718 Cayman GT4 RS Clubsport	46	(France) Julien Briché	PA	1–5
(France) JSB Compétition	Porsche 718 Cayman GT4 RS Clubsport	46	(France) Jean-Laurent Navarro	PA	1–5
(France) JSB Compétition	Porsche 718 Cayman GT4 RS Clubsport	131	(France) Mathieu Casalonga	Am	1–3
(Saudi Arabia) Saudi Racing with Comtoyou	Aston Martin Vantage AMR GT4	26	(Saudi Arabia) Bandar Alesayi	PA	6
(Saudi Arabia) Saudi Racing with Comtoyou	Aston Martin Vantage AMR GT4	26	(Saudi Arabia) Fahad Algosaibi	PA	6
(Saudi Arabia) Saudi Racing with Comtoyou	Aston Martin Vantage AMR GT4	28	(Saudi Arabia) Ahmed Bin-Khanen	Am	6
(Saudi Arabia) Saudi Racing with Comtoyou	Aston Martin Vantage AMR GT4	28	(Saudi Arabia) Reema Juffali	Am	6
(Sweden) Nova Racing	Porsche 718 Cayman GT4 RS Clubsport	27	(Sweden) Edvin Hellsten	PA	3–5
(Sweden) Nova Racing	Porsche 718 Cayman GT4 RS Clubsport	27	(Sweden) Daniel Nilsson	PA	3–5
(Germany) W&S Motorsport	Porsche 718 Cayman GT4 RS Clubsport	30	(Germany) Max Kronberg	PA	All
(Germany) W&S Motorsport	Porsche 718 Cayman GT4 RS Clubsport	30	(Germany) Finn Zulauf	PA	All
(Germany) W&S Motorsport	Porsche 718 Cayman GT4 RS Clubsport	31	(Israel) Alon Gabbay	PA	4
(Germany) W&S Motorsport	Porsche 718 Cayman GT4 RS Clubsport	31	(Bulgaria) Tano Neumann	PA	4
(Germany) W&S Motorsport	Porsche 718 Cayman GT4 RS Clubsport	31	(Israel) Alon Gabbay	S	5
(Germany) W&S Motorsport	Porsche 718 Cayman GT4 RS Clubsport	31	(Germany) Fabio Rauer	S	5
(France) Chazel Technologie Course	Alpine A110 GT4	33	(France) Jean-Mathieu Leandri	PA 1–2; Am 3–6	1–5
(France) Chazel Technologie Course	Alpine A110 GT4	33	(Belgium) Lorens Lecertua	PA 1–2; Am 3–6	1
(France) Chazel Technologie Course	Alpine A110 GT4	33	(France) Matéo Herrero	PA 1–2; Am 3–6	2
(France) Chazel Technologie Course	Alpine A110 GT4	33	(France) Jean-Paul Dominici	PA 1–2; Am 3–6	3, 6
(France) Chazel Technologie Course	Alpine A110 GT4	33	(France) Frédéric Roy	PA 1–2; Am 3–6	4
(France) Chazel Technologie Course	Alpine A110 GT4	33	(France) Xavier Follenfant	PA 1–2; Am 3–6	6
(France) Chazel Technologie Course	BMW M4 GT4 Gen II	317	(France) Antoni de Barn	PA	All
(France) Chazel Technologie Course	BMW M4 GT4 Gen II	317	(France) Grégory Guilvert	PA	1–5
(France) Chazel Technologie Course	BMW M4 GT4 Gen II	317	(France) Jean-Mathieu Leandri	PA	1–6
(France) Code Racing Development	Alpine A110 GT4	36	(France) Antoine Leclerc	S	All
(France) Code Racing Development	Alpine A110 GT4	36	(France) Nelson Panciatici	S	All
(San Marino) W&D Racing Team	BMW M4 GT4 Gen II	37	(San Marino) Davide Meloni	PA	All
(San Marino) W&D Racing Team	BMW M4 GT4 Gen II	37	(San Marino) Paolo Meloni	PA	All
(Canada) ST Racing	BMW M4 GT4 Gen II	38	(United States) Jon Miller	PA	3
(Canada) ST Racing	BMW M4 GT4 Gen II	38	(Canada) Samantha Tan	PA	3
(France) GPA Racing	Aston Martin Vantage AMR GT4	39	(France) Baudouin Detout	S	1–2, 5
(France) GPA Racing	Aston Martin Vantage AMR GT4	39	(Brazil) Roberto Faria	S	1–2, 5
(France) GPA Racing	Aston Martin Vantage AMR GT4	72	(France) Florent Grizaud	Am	All
(France) GPA Racing	Aston Martin Vantage AMR GT4	72	(France) Kévin Jimenez	Am	All
(Switzerland) Racing Spirit of Léman	Aston Martin Vantage AMR GT4 Evo	39	(France) Baudouin Detout	S	3–4, 6
(Switzerland) Racing Spirit of Léman	Aston Martin Vantage AMR GT4 Evo	39	(Brazil) Roberto Faria	S	3–4, 6
(Switzerland) Racing Spirit of Léman	Aston Martin Vantage AMR GT4 Evo	74	(Switzerland) David Kullmann	S	1–5
(Switzerland) Racing Spirit of Léman	Aston Martin Vantage AMR GT4 Evo	74	(Brazil) Alexandre Machado	S	1–5
(Switzerland) Racing Spirit of Léman	Aston Martin Vantage AMR GT4 Evo	82	(United Kingdom) Jamie Day	S	1, 3–5
(Switzerland) Racing Spirit of Léman	Aston Martin Vantage AMR GT4 Evo	82	(Ecuador) Mateo Villagómez	S	1, 3–5
(United States) NOLASport	Porsche 718 Cayman GT4 RS Clubsport	47	(United States) Jason Hart	PA	3
(United States) NOLASport	Porsche 718 Cayman GT4 RS Clubsport	47	(United States) Matt Travis	PA	3
(Austria) SVC Sport Management	Toyota GR Supra GT4 Evo	50	(Poland) Antoni Chodzen	PA	4–5
(Austria) SVC Sport Management	Toyota GR Supra GT4 Evo	50	(Italy) Piotr Chodzen	PA	4–5
(France) Schumacher CLRT	Alpine A110 GT4	55	(France) Laurent Hurgon	Am	All
(France) Schumacher CLRT	Alpine A110 GT4	55	(France) Pascal Huteau	Am	All
(Austria) Razoon-more than racing (Note: Car no. 60 was entered as Razoon-more than racing, and car no. 70 was entered as Razoon xAutomotive racing)	Porsche 718 Cayman GT4 RS Clubsport	40	(Denmark) Simon Birch	S	6
(Austria) Razoon-more than racing	Porsche 718 Cayman GT4 RS Clubsport	40	(Armenia) Ivan Ekelchik	S	6
(Austria) Razoon-more than racing	Porsche 718 Cayman GT4 RS Clubsport	60	(Austria) Richard Wolf	PA	All
(Austria) Razoon-more than racing	Porsche 718 Cayman GT4 RS Clubsport	60	(Switzerland) Gustavo Xavier	PA	All
(Austria) Razoon-more than racing	BMW M4 GT4 Gen II	70	(Netherlands) Rick Bouthoorn	PA	1–5
(Austria) Razoon-more than racing	BMW M4 GT4 Gen II	70	(Turkey) Önder Erdem	PA	All
(Austria) Razoon-more than racing	BMW M4 GT4 Gen II	70	(Austria) M. Tarillion	PA	6
(United Kingdom) Academy Motorsport	Ford Mustang GT4 (2024)	61	(United States) Erik Evans	S	All
(United Kingdom) Academy Motorsport	Ford Mustang GT4 (2024)	61	(Canada) Marco Signoretti	S	All
(United Kingdom) Academy Motorsport	Ford Mustang GT4 (2024)	62	(United Kingdom) Will Moore	S	All
(United Kingdom) Academy Motorsport	Ford Mustang GT4 (2024)	62	(United Kingdom) Matt Nicoll-Jones	S	All
(France) Vic'Team	Mercedes AMG GT4	64	(France) Olivier Jouffret	PA	TBA
(France) Vic'Team	Mercedes AMG GT4	64	(France) Eric Tremoulet	PA	TBA
(United Kingdom) Mahiki Racing	Lotus Emira GT4	69	(United Kingdom) Steven Lake	Am 1–3, 5 PA 4	1–5
(United Kingdom) Mahiki Racing	Lotus Emira GT4	69	(United Kingdom) Jordan Kerridge	Am 1–3, 5 PA 4	1–5
(United Kingdom) Mahiki Racing	Lotus Emira GT4	96	(United Kingdom) Max Bird	S	1–5
(United Kingdom) Mahiki Racing	Lotus Emira GT4	96	(United Kingdom) Dexter Patterson	S	1–5
(Austria) Wimmer Werk Motorsport	Porsche 718 Cayman GT4 RS Clubsport	71	(Italy) Eric Scalvini	PA	5
(Austria) Wimmer Werk Motorsport	Porsche 718 Cayman GT4 RS Clubsport	71	(Austria) Max Wimmer	PA	5
(Austria) Wimmer Werk Motorsport	Porsche 718 Cayman GT4 RS Clubsport	91	(Armenia) Ivan Ekelchik	S	1–5
(Austria) Wimmer Werk Motorsport	Porsche 718 Cayman GT4 RS Clubsport	91	(Denmark) Nicolaj Møller Madsen	S	1–5
(Austria) Wimmer Werk Motorsport	Porsche 718 Cayman GT4 RS Clubsport	92	(Norway) Emil Heyerdahl	S	1–5
(Austria) Wimmer Werk Motorsport	Porsche 718 Cayman GT4 RS Clubsport	92	(United States) Nicholas Maloy	S	1–4
(Austria) Wimmer Werk Motorsport	Porsche 718 Cayman GT4 RS Clubsport	92	(Austria) Raphael Rennhofer	S	5
(United Kingdom) Elite Motorsport with Entire Race Engineering	McLaren Artura GT4	77	(Republic of Ireland) Alex Denning	S	All
(United Kingdom) Elite Motorsport with Entire Race Engineering	McLaren Artura GT4	77	(United Kingdom) Tom Emson	S	All
(United Kingdom) Elite Motorsport with Entire Race Engineering	McLaren Artura GT4	78	(United Kingdom) Tom Lebbon	S	All
(United Kingdom) Elite Motorsport with Entire Race Engineering	McLaren Artura GT4	78	(United Kingdom) Josh Rattican	S	All
(United States) RAFA Racing Club	McLaren Artura GT4	81	(United Kingdom) Jem Hepworth	S	1–5
(United States) RAFA Racing Club	McLaren Artura GT4	81	(United States) Cameron Lawrence	S	1–5
(United States) RAFA Racing Club	McLaren Artura GT4	812	(United Kingdom) Jon Lancaster	PA	1–5
(United States) RAFA Racing Club	McLaren Artura GT4	812	(Mexico) Rafael Martínez	PA	1–5
Toyota Gazoo Racing Sweden	Toyota GR Supra GT4 Evo	90	(Sweden) Hans Holmlund	PA	1–5
Toyota Gazoo Racing Sweden	Toyota GR Supra GT4 Evo	90	(Sweden) Emil Skärås	PA	1–5
Toyota Gazoo Racing Sweden	Toyota GR Supra GT4 Evo	155	(Sweden) Christoffer Brunnhagen	Am	1–5
Toyota Gazoo Racing Sweden	Toyota GR Supra GT4 Evo	155	(Sweden) Mikael Brunnhagen	Am	1–5
(Sweden) Lestrup Racing Team	BMW M4 GT4 Gen II	97	(Sweden) Stefan Nilsson	Am	1–5
(Sweden) Lestrup Racing Team	BMW M4 GT4 Gen II	97	(Sweden) Mats Olsson	Am	1–5
(Sweden) Lestrup Racing Team	BMW M4 GT4 Gen II	98	(Sweden) Victor Bouveng	PA	1–5
(Sweden) Lestrup Racing Team	BMW M4 GT4 Gen II	98	(Sweden) Joakim Walde	PA	1–5
(Germany) PROsport Racing	Aston Martin Vantage AMR GT4	99	(Austria) Raphael Rennhofer	S	1–4
(Germany) PROsport Racing	Aston Martin Vantage AMR GT4	99	(Germany) Hugo Sasse	S	1–4
(Germany) PROsport Racing	Aston Martin Vantage AMR GT4	100	(Germany) Fabio Rauer	S	1–4
(Germany) PROsport Racing	Aston Martin Vantage AMR GT4	100	(Germany) Hendrik Still	S	1–4
(Slovenia) Lema Racing	Mercedes AMG GT4	119	(Slovenia) Mark Kastelic	PA	5
(Slovenia) Lema Racing	Mercedes AMG GT4	119	(Finland) Elias Niskanen	PA	5
Entrylists:

Icon	Class
S	Silver Cup
PA	Pro-Am Cup
Am	Am Cup

== Race results ==
Bold indicates overall winner.

Round		Circuit	Pole position	Silver Winners	Pro-Am Winners	Am Winners
1	R1	(France) Paul Ricard	(France) No. 9 TGR Team Matmut Évolution	**(France) No. 9 TGR Team Matmut Évolution**	(France) No. 7 Mirage Racing	(France) No. 55 Schumacher CLRT
1	R1	(France) Paul Ricard	(France) Etienne Cheli (Andorra) Enzo Joulié	**(France) Etienne Cheli** **(Andorra) Enzo Joulié**	Stanislav Safronov; Aleksandr Vaintrub	(France) Laurent Hurgon (France) Pascal Huteau
1	R2	(France) Paul Ricard	(Germany) No. 100 PROsport Racing	**(Germany) No. 99 PROsport Racing**	(Germany) No. 30 W&S Motorsport	(France) No. 55 Schumacher CLRT
1	R2	(France) Paul Ricard	(Germany) Fabio Rauer (Germany) Hendrik Still	**(Austria) Raphael Rennhofer** **(Germany) Hugo Sasse**	(Germany) Max Kronberg (Germany) Finn Zulauf	(France) Laurent Hurgon (France) Pascal Huteau
2	R1	(Italy) Misano	(Spain) No. 15 NM Racing Team	**(Spain) No. 15 NM Racing Team**	(France) No. 46 JSB Compétition	(France) No. 72 GPA Racing
2	R1	(Italy) Misano	(Spain) Lluc Ibáñez (United States) Alexandre Papadopulos	**(Spain) Lluc Ibáñez** **(United States) Alexandre Papadopulos**	(France) Julien Briché (France) Jean-Laurent Navarro	(France) Florent Grizaud (France) Kévin Jimenez
2	R2	(Italy) Misano	(France) No. 3 Team Speedcar	**No. 17 BMW Team France L'Espace Bienvenue**	(France) No. 75 AV Racing	(France) No. 55 Schumacher CLRT
2	R2	(Italy) Misano	(France) Robert Consani (France) Benjamin Lariche	**(Netherlands) Ricardo van der Ende** **(Belgium) Benjamin Lessennes**	(France) Noam Abramczyk (France) Paul Petit	(France) Laurent Hurgon (France) Pascal Huteau
3	R1	(Belgium) Spa	(United Kingdom) No. 78 Elite Motorsport with Entire Race Engineering	**(United Kingdom) No. 78 Elite Motorsport with Entire Race Engineering**	(Germany) No. 30 W&S Motorsport	(France) No. 55 Schumacher CLRT
3	R1	(Belgium) Spa	(United Kingdom) Tom Lebbon (United Kingdom) Josh Rattican	**(United Kingdom) Tom Lebbon** **(United Kingdom) Josh Rattican**	(Germany) Max Kronberg (Germany) Finn Zulauf	(France) Laurent Hurgon (France) Pascal Huteau
3	R2	(Belgium) Spa	(United Kingdom) No. 78 Elite Motorsport with Entire Race Engineering	**(United Kingdom) No. 78 Elite Motorsport with Entire Race Engineering**	(France) No. 317 Chazel Technologie Course	(France) No. 55 Schumacher CLRT
3	R2	(Belgium) Spa	(United Kingdom) Tom Lebbon (United Kingdom) Josh Rattican	**(United Kingdom) Tom Lebbon** **(United Kingdom) Josh Rattican**	(France) Antoni de Barn (France) Grégory Guilvert	(France) Laurent Hurgon (France) Pascal Huteau
4	R1	(Germany) Hockenheimring	(Spain) No. 15 NM Racing Team	**(Turkey) No. 12 Borusan Otomotiv Motorsport**	(Germany) No. 31 W&S Motorsport	(France) No. 55 Schumacher CLRT
4	R1	(Germany) Hockenheimring	(Spain) Lluc Ibáñez (United States) Alexandre Papadopulos	**(Turkey) Berkay Besler** **(Italy) Gabriele Piana**	(Israel) Alon Gabbay (Bulgaria) Tano Neumann	(France) Laurent Hurgon (France) Pascal Huteau
4	R2	(Germany) Hockenheimring	(United Kingdom) No. 78 Elite Motorsport with Entire Race Engineering	**(France) No. 36 Code Racing Development**	(France) No. 7 Mirage Racing	(Spain) No. 16 NM Racing Team
4	R2	(Germany) Hockenheimring	(United Kingdom) Tom Lebbon (United Kingdom) Josh Rattican	**(France) Antoine Leclerc** **(France) Nelson Panciatici**	Stanislav Safronov; Aleksandr Vaintrub	(United States) Andy Cantu (United Kingdom) Charles Dawson
5	R1	(Italy) Monza	(France) No. 3 Team Speedcar	**(France) No. 3 Team Speedcar**	(France) No. 7 Mirage Racing	(France) No. 33 Chazel Technologie Course
5	R1	(Italy) Monza	(France) Benjamin Lariche (France) Robert Consani	**(France) Benjamin Lariche** **(France) Robert Consani**	Stanislav Safronov; Aleksandr Vaintrub	(France) Jean-Mathieu Leandri
5	R2	(Italy) Monza	(France) No. 3 Team Speedcar	**(France) No. 3 Team Speedcar**	(Germany) No. 30 W&S Motorsport	(Spain) No. 16 NM Racing Team
5	R2	(Italy) Monza	(France) Benjamin Lariche (France) Robert Consani	**(France) Benjamin Lariche** **(France) Robert Consani**	(Germany) Max Kronberg (Germany) Finn Zulauf	(United States) Andy Cantu (United Kingdom) Charles Dawson
6	R1	(Saudi Arabia) Jeddah	(United Kingdom) No. 78 Elite Motorsport with Entire Race Engineering	**(France) No. 3 Team Speedcar**	**(France)** No. 110 AVR-Avvatar	(France) No. 55 Schumacher CLRT
6	R1	(Saudi Arabia) Jeddah	(United Kingdom) Tom Lebbon (United Kingdom) Josh Rattican	**(France) Benjamin Lariche** **(France) Robert Consani**	(France) Julien Piguet (France) Alban Varutti	(France) Laurent Hurgon (France) Pascal Huteau
6	R2	(Saudi Arabia) Jeddah	(France) No. 3 Team Speedcar	**(France) No. 3 Team Speedcar**	(Spain) No. 16 NM Racing Team	(France) No. 72 GPA Racing
6	R2	(Saudi Arabia) Jeddah	(France) Benjamin Lariche (France) Robert Consani	**(France) Benjamin Lariche** **(France) Robert Consani**	(United States) Andy Cantu (United Kingdom) Charles Dawson	(France) Florent Grizaud (France) Kévin Jimenez

== Championship standings ==
=== Drivers' championship ===
Pos.	Driversf	Team	LEC (France)		MIS (Italy)		SPA (Belgium)		HOC (Germany)		MNZ (Italy)		JED (Saudi Arabia)		Points
Silver Cup
1	(United Kingdom) Tom Lebbon	(United Kingdom) Elite Motorsport with Entire Race Engineering	2	3	3	4	**1**	**1**	5	**4**	6	2	**3**	5	186
1	(United Kingdom) Josh Rattican	(United Kingdom) Elite Motorsport with Entire Race Engineering	2	3	3	4	**1**	**1**	5	**4**	6	2	**3**	5	186
2	(France) Benjamin Lariche	(France) Team Speedcar	5	42†	2	**2**	2	16	4	39†	**1**	**1**	1	**1**	180
2	(France) Robert Consani	(France) Team Speedcar	5	42†	2	**2**	2	16	4	39†	**1**	**1**	1	**1**	180
3	(Netherlands) Ricardo van der Ende	BMW Team France L'Espace Bienvenue	Ret	5	36†	1	5	2	7	5	11	7	5	2	113
3	(Belgium) Benjamin Lessennes	BMW Team France L'Espace Bienvenue	Ret	5	36†	1	5	2	7	5	11	7	5	2	113
4	(United States) Alexandre Papadopulos	(Spain) NM Racing Team	3	9	**1**	Ret	10	39	**3**	7	2	12	6	7	99
4	(Spain) Lluc Ibáñez	(Spain) NM Racing Team	3	9	**1**	Ret	10	39	**3**	7	2	12	6	7	99
5	(United Kingdom) Jamie Day	(Switzerland) Racing Spirit of Léman	7	14	8	24	4	Ret	8	6	3	3	4	3	91
5	(Ecuador) Mateo Villagómez	(Switzerland) Racing Spirit of Léman	7	14	8	24	4	Ret	8	6	3	3	4	3	91
6	(Turkey) Berkay Besler	(Turkey) Borusan Otomotiv Motorsport	6	6	38†	23	Ret	3	1	3	7	4	Ret	Ret	89
6	(Italy) Gabriele Piana	(Turkey) Borusan Otomotiv Motorsport	6	6	38†	23	Ret	3	1	3	7	4	Ret	Ret	89
7	(France) Etienne Cheli	(France) TGR Team Matmut Évolution	**1**	2	6	37†	Ret	12	Ret	25	5	6	11	9	74
7	(Andorra) Enzo Joulié	(France) TGR Team Matmut Évolution	**1**	2	6	37†	Ret	12	Ret	25	5	6	11	9	74
8	(United States) Erik Evans	(United Kingdom) Academy Motorsport	14	35	15	6	9	5	2	2	9	17	8	6	74
8	(Canada) Marco Signoretti	(United Kingdom) Academy Motorsport	14	35	15	6	9	5	2	2	9	17	8	6	74
9	(France) Antoine Leclerc	(France) Code Racing Development	4	8	Ret	27	6	15	11	1	Ret	WD	10	8	56
9	(France) Nelson Panciatici	(France) Code Racing Development	4	8	Ret	27	6	15	11	1	Ret	WD			50
10	(Austria) Raphael Rennhofer	(Germany) PROsport Racing	41†	1	Ret	35†	3	7	17	12					50
10	(Austria) Raphael Rennhofer	(Austria) Wimmer Werk Motorsport									42†	8			50
11	(Germany) Hugo Sasse	(Germany) PROsport Racing	41†	1	Ret	35†	3	7	17	12					46
12	(Republic of Ireland) Alex Denning	(United Kingdom) Elite Motorsport with Entire Race Engineering	22	16	Ret	36	28	34	Ret	40†	4	5	2	10	41
12	(United Kingdom) Tom Emson	(United Kingdom) Elite Motorsport with Entire Race Engineering	22	16	Ret	36	28	34	Ret	40†	4	5	2	10	41
13	(Brazil) Pedro Ebrahim	(Turkey) Borusan Otomotiv Motorsport	10	12	37†	3	8	6	Ret	8	Ret	14	9	30†	38
13	(Turkey) Yagiz Gedik	(Turkey) Borusan Otomotiv Motorsport	10	12	37†	3	8	6	Ret	8	Ret	14	9	30†	38
14	(Armenia) Ivan Ekelchik	(Austria) Wimmer Werk Motorsport	12	18	4	5	32	9	6	Ret	8	21			36
14	(Armenia) Ivan Ekelchik	(Austria) Razoon-more than racing											Ret	12	36
15	(Denmark) Nicolaj Møller Madsen	(Austria) Wimmer Werk Motorsport	12	18	4	5	32	9	6	Ret	8	21			36
16	(Germany) Fabio Rauer	(Germany) PROsport Racing	8	**4**	9	11	DNS	21	Ret	42†					21
16	(Germany) Hendrik Still	(Germany) PROsport Racing	8	**4**	9	11	DNS	21	Ret	42†					21
17	(United Kingdom) Jem Hepworth	(United States) RAFA Racing Club	31†	15	17	Ret	11	4	39†	20	10	23			14
17	(United States) Cameron Lawrence	(United States) RAFA Racing Club	31†	15	17	Ret	11	4	39†	20	10	23			14
18	(Norway) Emil Heyerdahl	(Austria) Wimmer Werk Motorsport	17	20	7	18	46†	27	9	Ret	42†	8			13
19	(Austria) Leo Pichler	(Germany) Allied-Racing	27	Ret	5	Ret	Ret	29	27	11	29	Ret			11
19	(Germany) Herolind Nuredini	(Germany) Allied-Racing	27	Ret	5	Ret	Ret	29	27	11					11
20	(United States) Nicholas Maloy	(Austria) Wimmer Werk Motorsport	17	20	7	18	46†	27	9	Ret					9
21	(United Kingdom) Will Moore	(United Kingdom) Academy Motorsport	38	22	12	7	22	Ret	12	16	14	13	21		7
21	(United Kingdom) Matt Nicoll-Jones	(United Kingdom) Academy Motorsport	38	22	12	7	22	Ret	12	16	14	13	21		7
22	(France) Baudouin Detout	(France) GPA Racing	32†	7	26	22									6
22	(France) Baudouin Detout	(Switzerland) Racing Spirit of Léman					27	30	Ret	41†	DNS	WD	12	11	6
22	(Brazil) Roberto Faria	(France) GPA Racing	32†	7	26	22									6
22	(Brazil) Roberto Faria	(Switzerland) Racing Spirit of Léman					27	30	Ret	41†	DNS	WD			6
23	(United Kingdom) Aston Millar	(United Kingdom) Forsetti Motorsport					23	8							4
23	(United Kingdom) Mikey Porter	(United Kingdom) Forsetti Motorsport					23	8							4
24	(France) Sacha Bottemanne	(France) AV Racing	21	Ret	33	10									4
24	(France) Lonni Martins	(France) AV Racing	21	Ret	33	10									4
25	(United Kingdom) Josh Miller	(France) Mirage Racing	9	10	14	38†	35	44	13	Ret	12	16	Ret	WD	3
25	(Netherlands) Ruben del Sarte	(France) Mirage Racing	9	10	14	38†	35	44	13	Ret	12	16	Ret	WD	3
26	(Poland) Maksymilian Angelard	(Germany) Allied-Racing	15	26	Ret	19	45†	Ret	26	18	Ret	9			2
26	(Denmark) Oskar Lind Kristensen	(Germany) Allied-Racing	15	26	Ret	19	45†	Ret	26	18	Ret	9			2
27	(France) Viny Beltramelli	(France) JSB Compétition	Ret	DNS	Ret	WD	44	31	22	10	18	15	14	18	2
27	(France) Florian Briché	(France) JSB Compétition	Ret	DNS	Ret	WD	44	31	22	10	18	15	14	18	2
28	(Belgium) Nathan Vanspringel	(Belgium) TeamFloral-Vanspringel					25	22	Ret	21	15	10			1
28	(Belgium) Nico Verdonck	(Belgium) TeamFloral-Vanspringel							Ret	21	15	10			1
-	(Switzerland) David Kullmann	(Switzerland) Racing Spirit of Léman	25	Ret	Ret	29			Ret	22	21	33†	12	11	0
-	(Denmark) Simon Birch	(Austria) Razoon-more than racing											Ret	12	0
-	(France) Loris Cabirou	(France) Team CMR					16	Ret							0
-	(United Kingdom) Freddie Tomlinson	(France) Team CMR					16	Ret							0
-	(Israel) Alon Gabbay	(Germany) W&S Motorsport									16	35			0
-	(Germany) Fabio Rauer	(Germany) W&S Motorsport									16	35			0
-	(Finland) Benjamin Sylvestersson	(Italy) Team Promodrive			20	26									0
-	(Italy) Jody Simone Vullo	(Italy) Team Promodrive			20	26									0
-	(Brazil) Alexandre Machado	(Switzerland) Racing Spirit of Léman	25	Ret	Ret	29			Ret	22	21	33†			0
-	(Belgium) Frédéric Caprasse	(Belgium) TeamFloral-Vanspringel					25	22							0
-	(United Kingdom) Max Bird	(United Kingdom) Mahiki Racing	42†	36	24	Ret	Ret	Ret	Ret	Ret	28	Ret			0
-	(United Kingdom) Dexter Patterson	(United Kingdom) Mahiki Racing	42†	36	24	Ret	Ret	Ret	Ret	Ret	28	Ret			0
-	(Morocco) Suleiman Zanfari	(Germany) Allied-Racing									29	Ret			0
-	(France) Hugo Bac	(France) Team CMR					Ret	DNS							-
-	(France) Hugo Mogica	(France) Team CMR					Ret	DNS							-
Pro-Am Cup
1	(Germany) Max Kronberg	(Germany) W&S Motorsport	13	**11**	30	**40†**	7	**18**	19	**9**	17	11	Ret	15	178
1	(Germany) Finn Zulauf	(Germany) W&S Motorsport	13	**11**	30	**40†**	7	**18**	19	**9**	17	11	Ret	15	178
2	Stanislav Safronov	(France) Mirage Racing	**11**	13	11	9	17	24	15	19	13	34	15	Ret	164
2	Aleksandr Vaintrub	(France) Mirage Racing	**11**	13	11	9	17	24	15	19	13	34	15	Ret	164
3	(France) Noam Abramczyk	(France) AV Racing	19	19	16	8	14	47†	18	Ret	24	**18**	28†	**17**	132
3	(France) Paul Petit	(France) AV Racing	19	19	16	8	14	47†	18	Ret	24	**18**	28†	**17**	132
4	(France) Antoni de Barn	(France) Chazel Technologie Course	DNS	21	13	Ret	21	10	16	26	25	28			91
4	(France) Grégory Guilvert	(France) Chazel Technologie Course	DNS	21	13	Ret	21	10	16	26	25	28			91
5	(France) Julien Briché	(France) JSB Compétition	33†	Ret	**10**	12	13	23	33	29	39†	Ret	18	16	89
5	(France) Jean-Laurent Navarro	(France) JSB Compétition	33†	Ret	**10**	12	13	23	33	29	39†	Ret	18	16	89
6	(France) Cindy Gudet	(France) TGR Team Matmut Évolution	16	25	19	Ret	18	25	Ret	Ret	31	24	17	19	74
6	(Czech Republic) Gabriela Jílková	(France) TGR Team Matmut Évolution	16	25	19	Ret	18	25	Ret	Ret	31	24	17	19	74
7	(Sweden) Victor Bouveng	(Sweden) Lestrup Racing Team	24	28	22	16	26	13	Ret	Ret	22	22			59
7	(Sweden) Joakim Walde	(Sweden) Lestrup Racing Team	24	28	22	16	26	13	Ret	Ret	22	22			59
8	(San Marino) Davide Meloni	(San Marino) W&D Racing Team	23	23	Ret	32	30	11	32	23	WD	WD	24	27	56
8	(San Marino) Paolo Meloni	(San Marino) W&D Racing Team	23	23	Ret	32	30	11	32	23	WD	WD	24	27	56
9	(Switzerland) Gustavo Xavier	(Austria) Razoon-more than racing	30	27	28	21	41	36	20	30	Ret	41†	13	22	52
9	(Austria) Richard Wolf	(Austria) Razoon-more than racing	30	27	28	21	41	36	20	30	Ret	41†	13	22	52
10	(Sweden) Hans Holmlund	Toyota Gazoo Racing Sweden	Ret	24	21	Ret	20	19	30	27	26	38			40
10	(Sweden) Emil Skärås	Toyota Gazoo Racing Sweden	Ret	24	21	Ret	20	19	30	27	26	38			40
11	(Sweden) Edvin Hellsten	(Sweden) Nova Racing					47†	26	25	14	20	36			38
11	(Sweden) Daniel Nilsson	(Sweden) Nova Racing					47†	26	25	14	20	36			38
12	(United States) Andy Cantu	(Spain) NM Racing Team											22	13	33
12	(United Kingdom) Charles Dawson	(Spain) NM Racing Team											22	13	33
13	(Turkey) Önder Erdem	(Austria) Razoon-more than racing	26	39	Ret	25	24	40	24	17	35	30	Ret	28	33
14	Andrey Solukovtsev	(United Arab Emirates) Teichmann Continental Racing	28	29	Ret	15					Ret	31	19	23	31
14	(Cyprus) Vasily Vladykin	(United Arab Emirates) Teichmann Continental Racing	28	29	Ret	15					Ret	31	19	23	31
15	(Netherlands) Rick Bouthoorn	(Austria) Razoon-more than racing	26	39	Ret	25	24	40	24	17	35	30			31
16	(United Kingdom) Jon Lancaster	(United States) RAFA Racing Club	34	31	27	14	39	45	36	15	**38†**	WD			29
16	(Mexico) Rafael Martínez	(United States) RAFA Racing Club	34	31	27	14	39	45	36	15	**38†**	WD			29
17	(Israel) Alon Gabbay	(Germany) W&S Motorsport							**10**	31					26
17	(Bulgaria) Tano Neumann	(Germany) W&S Motorsport							**10**	31					26
18	(Italy) Eric Scalvini	(Austria) Wimmer Werk Motorsport									27	19			19
18	(Austria) Max Wimmer	(Austria) Wimmer Werk Motorsport									27	19			19
19	(France) Ethan Gialdini	(Belgium) Team CMR					12	32							18
19	(Belgium) Stéphane Lémeret	(Belgium) Team CMR					12	32							18
20	(France) Jean-Mathieu Leandri	(France) Chazel Technologie Course	Ret	43†	25	13									16
21	(France) Matéo Herrero	(France) Chazel Technologie Course			25	13									16
22	(United States) Jon Miller	(Canada) ST Racing					36	17							12
22	(Canada) Samantha Tan	(Canada) ST Racing					36	17							12
23	(Germany) Denis Bulatov	(Germany) EastSide Motorsport	18	30	Ret	WD									12
23	(Germany) Lukas Mayer	(Germany) EastSide Motorsport	18	30	Ret	WD									12
24	(France) Sacha Bottemanne	(France) AV Racing					15	28	Ret	32	Ret	Ret			10
24	(France) Lonni Martins	(France) AV Racing					15	28	Ret	32	Ret	Ret			10
25	(United States) Jason Hart	(United States) NOLASport					38	20							6
25	(United States) Matt Travis	(United States) NOLASport					38	20							6
26	(Slovenia) Mark Kastelic	(Slovenia) Lema Racing									30	40†			2
26	(Finland) Elias Niskanen	(Slovenia) Lema Racing									30	40†			2
-	(France) Julien Piguet	**(France)** AVR-Avvatar											**7**	14	0
-	(France) Alban Varutti	**(France)** AVR-Avvatar											**7**	14	0
-	(Austria) Maximilian Tarillion	(Austria) Razoon-more than racing											Ret	28	0
-	(United Arab Emirates) Mathieu Detry	(United Kingdom) Simpson Teleios Motorsport					34	33							0
-	(United Arab Emirates) Fabian Duffieux	(United Kingdom) Simpson Teleios Motorsport					34	33							0
-	(Poland) Antoni Chodzen	(Austria) SVC Sport Management							35	36					0
-	(Italy) Piotr Chodzen	(Austria) SVC Sport Management							35	36					0
-	(Belgium) Quentin Denis	(France) Team Speedcar					Ret	38							0
-	(Belgium) Florian van Dooren	(France) Team Speedcar					Ret	38							0
-	(Belgium) Lorens Lecertua	(France) Chazel Technologie Course	Ret	43†											0
-	(Saudi Arabia) Bandar Alesayi	(Saudi Arabia) Saudi Racing with Comtoyou											Ret	WD	-
-	(Saudi Arabia) Fahad Algosaibi	(Saudi Arabia) Saudi Racing with Comtoyou											Ret	WD	-
Am Cup
1	(France) Laurent Hurgon	(France) Schumacher CLRT	**20**	**17**	Ret	**17**	19	**14**	**14**	**24**	23	**Ret**	16	26	230
1	(France) Pascal Huteau	(France) Schumacher CLRT	**20**	**17**	Ret	**17**	19	**14**	**14**	**24**	23	**Ret**	16	26	230
2	(France) Florent Grizaud	(France) GPA Racing	29	DNS	18	20	29	Ret	23	33	33	26	27	20	168
2	(France) Kévin Jimenez	(France) GPA Racing	29	DNS	18	20	29	Ret	23	33	33	26	27	20	168
3	(United States) Andy Cantu	(Spain) NM Racing Team	37	34	**23**	39	**31**	46	31	13	40	20			131
4	(France) Julien Ripert	(France) Team Speedcar	39	40	31	31	43	41	29	35	41†	25	26	25	122
5	(France) Jean-Mathieu Leandri	(France) Chazel Technologie Course					33	37	28	Ret	19	39†	**20**	**21**	109
6	(Sweden) Christoffer Brunnhagen	Toyota Gazoo Racing Sweden	36	33	29	28	42	42	37	37	37	27			105
6	(Sweden) Mikael Brunnhagen	Toyota Gazoo Racing Sweden	36	33	29	28	42	42	37	37	37	27			105
7	(France) Philippe Thalamy	(France) Team Speedcar	39	40	31	31	43	41	29	35	41†	25			95
8	(Sweden) Stefan Nilsson	(Sweden) Lestrup Racing Team	40	37	32	30	40	43	38	34	34	29			90
8	(Sweden) Mats Olsson	(Sweden) Lestrup Racing Team	40	37	32	30	40	43	38	34	34	29			90
9	(France) Nicolas Markiewicz	(France) Team Speedcar	35	32					21	28	**32**	42†			84
9	(France) Adrien Paviot	(France) Team Speedcar	35	32					21	28	**32**	42†			84
10	(United Kingdom) Charles Dawson	(Spain) NM Racing Team							31	13	40	20			62
11	(France) Jean-Paul Dominici	(France) Chazel Technologie Course					33	37					25	29†	55
12	(Sri Lanka) Dilantha Malagamuwa	(Spain) NM Racing Team	37	34	**23**	39									45
13	(United Kingdom) Steven Lake	(United Kingdom) Mahiki Racing	Ret	38	34	33			34	38	Ret	37			40
13	(United Kingdom) Jordan Kerridge	(United Kingdom) Mahiki Racing	Ret	38	34	33			34	38	Ret	37			40
14	(France) Antoni de Barn	(France) Chazel Technologie Course											**20**	**21**	38
15	(Spain) Guillermo Aso	(Spain) NM Racing Team					**31**	46							24
16	(Poland) Antoni Chodzen	(Austria) SVC Sport Management									36	32			16
16	(Italy) Piotr Chodzen	(Austria) SVC Sport Management									36	32			16
17	(France) Mathieu Casalonga	(France) JSB Compétition	DNS	41†	35	34									16
18	(France) Frédéric Roy	(France) Chazel Technologie Course							28	Ret					12
-	(France) Romain Vozniak	(France) AV Racing											23	WD	0
-	(Saudi Arabia) Reema Juffali	(Saudi Arabia) Saudi Racing with Comtoyou											Ret	24	0
-	(Saudi Arabia) Ahmed Bin-Khanen	(Saudi Arabia) Saudi Racing with Comtoyou											Ret	24	0
-	(France) Xavier Follenfant	(France) Chazel Technologie Course											25	29†	0

Colour	Result
Gold	Winner
Silver	Second place
Bronze	Third place
Green	Points classification
Blue	Non-points classification
Blue	Non-classified finish (NC)
Purple	Retired, not classified (Ret)
Red	Did not qualify (DNQ)
Red	Did not pre-qualify (DNPQ)
Black	Disqualified (DSQ)
White	Did not start (DNS)
White	Withdrew (WD)
White	Race cancelled (C)
Blank	Did not practice (DNP)
Blank	Did not arrive (DNA)
Blank	Excluded (EX)

**Bold** indicates pole position

== See also ==
- 2024 British GT Championship
- 2024 French GT4 Cup
- 2024 GT4 America Series
- 2024 GT4 Australia Series
- 2024 GT World Challenge Asia
