= Sölvesborgs GoIF =

Swedish football club

- Full name: Sölvesborgs Gymnastik-och Idrottsförening
- Nickname: SGIF
- Founded: 1915
- Ground: Svarta Led; Sölvesborg; Sweden
- Capacity: 2,500
- Chairman: Tomas Bonli
- Head coach: Daniel Nilsson
- League: Division 3 Sydöstra Götaland
- 2018: Division 2 Östra Götaland, 13th
Home colours

Sölvesborgs GoIF is a Swedish football club located in Sölvesborg in Blekinge.

== Background ==
Sölvesborgs Gymnastik-och Idrottsförening were founded on 13 October 1915.

Since their foundation Sölvesborgs GoIF has participated mainly in the middle divisions of the Swedish football league system. For 3 seasons over the period 1967–69 SGIF played in Division 2 Södra Götaland which at that time was the second tier of Swedish football. The club currently plays in Division 2 Södra Götaland which is now the fourth tier of Swedish football. They play their home matches at the Svarta Led in Sölvesborg.

Sölvesborgs GoIF are affiliated to the Blekinge Fotbollförbund. SGIF have two men's teams, the first team and FC Giffarna. The club also runs an active youth section serving 400 young people.

Kalmar FF player Abiola Dauda played previously for SGIF making 35 appearances for the club in the period 2006–08.

== Season to season ==
Season	Level	Division	Section	Position	Movements
1993	Tier 5	Division 4	Blekinge	2nd	
1994	Tier 5	Division 4	Blekinge	1st	Promoted
1995	Tier 4	Division 3	Sydöstra Götaland	8th	
1996	Tier 4	Division 3	Sydöstra Götaland	10th	Relegated
1997	Tier 5	Division 4	Blekinge	4th	
1998	Tier 5	Division 4	Blekinge	3rd	
1999	Tier 5	Division 4	Blekinge	7th	
2000	Tier 5	Division 4	Blekinge	3rd	Promotion Playoffs – Promoted
2001	Tier 4	Division 3	Sydöstra Götaland	8th	
2002	Tier 4	Division 3	Sydöstra Götaland	3rd	
2003	Tier 4	Division 3	Sydöstra Götaland	11th	Relegated
2004	Tier 5	Division 4	Blekinge	2nd	Promotion Playoffs – Promoted
2005	Tier 4	Division 3	Sydvästra Götaland	2nd	Promoted
2006*	Tier 4	Division 2	Södra Götaland	6th	
2007	Tier 4	Division 2	Södra Götaland	8th	
2008	Tier 4	Division 2	Södra Götaland	12th	Relegated
2009	Tier 5	Division 3	Sydöstra Götaland	7th	
2010	Tier 5	Division 3	Sydöstra Götaland	1st	Promoted
2011	Tier 4	Division 2	Södra Götaland	9th	
2012	Tier 4	Division 2	Södra Götaland	10th	Relegation Playoffs
2013	Tier 4	Division 2	Södra Götaland	12th	Relegated
2014	Tier 5	Division 3	Sydöstra Götaland	8th	
2015	Tier 5	Division 3	Sydöstra Götaland	3rd	
2016	Tier 5	Division 3	Sydöstra Götaland	7th	
2017	Tier 5	Division 3	Sydöstra Götaland	2nd	Promotion Playoffs
2018	Tier 4	Division 2	Östra Götaland	13th	Relegated
2019	Tier 5	Division 3	Sydöstra Götaland	4th	
2020	Tier 5	Division 3	Sydöstra Götaland	1st	Promoted
2021	Tier 4	Division 2	Södra Götaland	14th	Relegated
2022	Tier 5	Division 3	Sydöstra Götaland	4th	
2023	Tier 5	Division 3	Södra Götaland	6th	
2024	Tier 5	Division 3	Sydöstra Götaland	2nd	Promotion Playoffs
2025	Tier 4	Division 2	Södra Götaland		

* League restructuring in 2006 resulted in a new division being created at Tier 3 and subsequent divisions dropping a level.

== Attendances ==
In recent seasons Sölvesborgs GoIF have had the following average attendances:

Season	Average attendance	Division / Section	Level
2005	578	Div 3 Sydvästra Götaland	Tier 4
2006	566	Div 2 Södra Götaland	Tier 4
2007	420	Div 2 Södra Götaland	Tier 4
2008	475	Div 2 Södra Götaland	Tier 4
2009	355	Div 3 Sydöstra Götaland	Tier 5
2010	295	Div 3 Sydöstra Götaland	Tier 5

* Attendances are provided in the Publikliga sections of the Svenska Fotbollförbundet website.
