= 2025 Porsche Carrera Cup France =

Motor racing championship

The 2025 Porsche Carrera Cup France was the 39th season of Porsche Carrera Cup France. The season began at Circuit de Barcelona-Catalunya on 4 April and finished at Circuit Paul Ricard on 5 October.

Marcus Amand became the Drivers' champion, after winning three races in the latter half of the campaign.

== Calendar ==
Round	Circuit	Date	Supporting	Map of circuit locations
1	Circuit de Barcelona-Catalunya, Montmeló, Spain	4–6 April	European Le Mans Series; Le Mans Cup; Ligier European Series	2025 Porsche Carrera Cup France is located in Europe
2	Dijon-Prenois, Prenois, France	9–11 May	French GT4 Cup; TC France Series	2025 Porsche Carrera Cup France is located in Europe
3	Circuit de Spa-Francorchamps, Stavelot, Belgium	20–22 June	French GT4 Cup; TC France Series	2025 Porsche Carrera Cup France is located in Europe
4	Misano World Circuit, Misano Adriatico, Italy	18–20 July	GT World Challenge Europe Sprint Cup; GT2 European Series; GT4 European Series; Clio Cup Series	2025 Porsche Carrera Cup France is located in Europe
5	Circuit Ricardo Tormo, Cheste, Spain	19–21 September	GT World Challenge Europe Sprint Cup; GT2 European Series; Clio Cup Series	2025 Porsche Carrera Cup France is located in Europe
6	Circuit Paul Ricard, Le Castellet, France	3–5 October	French GT4 Cup; TC France Series	2025 Porsche Carrera Cup France is located in Europe

== Entry list ==
Team	No.	Driver	Class	Rounds
(France) Debard Automobiles by Racetivity	2	(France) Hugo Chevalier	P	All
(France) Debard Automobiles by Racetivity	81	(France) Éric Debard	Am	All
(France) ABM	3	(France) Jean-Philippe Gambaro	Am	All
(France) ABM	21	(France) Marc Guillot	PA	All
(France) ABM	33	(France) Paul Cauhaupé	P	All
(France) ABM	51	(France) Mathys Cappuccio	P R	All
(France) ABM	74	(France) Marvin Klein	P	All
(France) Racing Technology	7	(France) Jérôme Boullery	PA	All
(France) Racing Technology	11	(France) Joran Leneutre	P R	All
(France) Racing Technology	44	(France) Cyril Caillo	PA	All
(France) TFT Racing	12	(Belgium) Benjamin Paque	P	All
(France) TFT Racing	18	(South Africa) Keagan Masters	P	1–4
(France) TFT Racing	18	(Bulgaria) Georgi Dimitrov	P R	6
(France) TFT Racing	23	(France) Jordan Boisson	Am	All
(France) Martinet by Alméras	16	(Germany) Theo Oeverhaus	P	1
(France) Martinet by Alméras	16	(France) Mathys Jaubert	P	2–6
(France) Martinet by Alméras	17	(Andorra) Enzo Joulié	P R	All
(Estonia) EST1 Racing	37	(Estonia) Ragnar Sepp	PA	5
(Estonia) EST1 Racing	47	(Estonia) Alexander Reimann	P	1, 3–6
(France) / CLRT Schumacher (Note: Cars No. 77 and No. 85 competed as Schumacher CLRT, while cars No. 88 and No. 99 competed as CLRT Schumacher.); (France) / Schumacher CLRT	77	(France) Louis Perrot	P	All
(France) / CLRT Schumacher; (France) / Schumacher CLRT	85	(Switzerland) Karen Gaillard	P R	All
(France) / CLRT Schumacher; (France) / Schumacher CLRT	88	(Luxembourg) Chester Kieffer	P R	All
(France) / CLRT Schumacher; (France) / Schumacher CLRT	99	(Finland) Marcus Amand	P	All
(France) GP Racing Team	89	(France) Loïc Teire	Am	4
(Belgium) W.D.P Racing Powered by NGT	98	(United Kingdom) Graham King	Am	3

Icon	Class
P	Pro Cup
PA	Pro-Am Cup
Am	Am Cup
R	Rookie
	Guest Starter

== Results ==
Round		Circuit	Pole position	Fastest lap	Overall winner	Winning team	Pro-Am winner	Am winner	Rookie winner
1	R1	(Spain) Circuit de Barcelona-Catalunya	(Germany) Theo Oeverhaus	(France) Marvin Klein	(Germany) Theo Oeverhaus	(France) Martinet by Alméras	(France) Marc Guillot	(France) Éric Debard	(Luxembourg) Chester Kieffer
1	R2	(Spain) Circuit de Barcelona-Catalunya	(Germany) Theo Oeverhaus	(Germany) Theo Oeverhaus	(Germany) Theo Oeverhaus	(France) Martinet by Alméras	(France) Marc Guillot	(France) Éric Debard	(Luxembourg) Chester Kieffer
2	R1	(France) Dijon-Prenois	(Finland) Marcus Amand	(Finland) Marcus Amand	(France) Mathys Jaubert (Note: Marcus Amand was the first driver to cross the finish line, but received a 5 second time penalty for being out of position on the starting grid. Mathys Jaubert, who was the second driver to cross the finish line, thus inherited the win.)	(France) Martinet by Alméras	(France) Jérôme Boullery	(France) Jordan Boisson	(Luxembourg) Chester Kieffer
2	R2	(France) Dijon-Prenois	(France) Mathys Jaubert	(France) Mathys Jaubert	(France) Mathys Jaubert	(France) Martinet by Alméras	(France) Marc Guillot	(France) Jordan Boisson	(Luxembourg) Chester Kieffer
3	R1	(Belgium) Circuit de Spa-Francorchamps	(France) Mathys Jaubert	(South Africa) Keagan Masters	(France) Louis Perrot	(France) Schumacher CLRT	(France) Jérôme Boullery	(United Kingdom) Graham King	(Andorra) Enzo Joulié
3	R2	(Belgium) Circuit de Spa-Francorchamps	(France) Mathys Jaubert	(France) Mathys Jaubert	(France) Mathys Jaubert	(France) Martinet by Alméras	(France) Marc Guillot	(France) Jordan Boisson	(Luxembourg) Chester Kieffer
4	R1	(Italy) Misano World Circuit	(France) Paul Cauhaupé	(France) Paul Cauhaupé	(France) Marvin Klein	(France) ABM	(France) Marc Guillot	(France) Jean-Philippe Gambaro	(Luxembourg) Chester Kieffer
4	R2	(Italy) Misano World Circuit	(France) Paul Cauhaupé	(Finland) Marcus Amand	(Finland) Marcus Amand (Note: Paul Cauhaupé originally won the race, but later received a 5 second time penalty for a false start. Marcus Amand, initially classified second, thus inherited the win.)	(France) CLRT Schumacher	(France) Marc Guillot	(France) Éric Debard	(Luxembourg) Chester Kieffer
5	R1	(Spain) Circuit Ricardo Tormo	(France) Mathys Jaubert	(France) Marvin Klein	(France) Mathys Jaubert	(France) Martinet by Alméras	(France) Jérôme Boullery	(France) Éric Debard	(Luxembourg) Chester Kieffer
5	R2	(Spain) Circuit Ricardo Tormo	(France) Mathys Jaubert	(France) Mathys Jaubert	(Finland) Marcus Amand	(France) CLRT Schumacher	(France) Marc Guillot	(France) Éric Debard	(Luxembourg) Chester Kieffer
6	R1	(France) Circuit Paul Ricard	(Finland) Marcus Amand	(France) Mathys Jaubert	(France) Marvin Klein	(France) ABM	(France) Jérôme Boullery	(France) Jordan Boisson	(Bulgaria) Georgi Dimitrov
6	R2	(France) Circuit Paul Ricard	(Finland) Marcus Amand	(France) Marvin Klein	(Finland) Marcus Amand	(France) CLRT Schumacher	(France) Jérôme Boullery	(France) Éric Debard	(Luxembourg) Chester Kieffer

== Championship standings ==
=== Scoring system ===
Position	**1st**	**2nd**	**3rd**	**4th**	**5th**	**6th**	**7th**	**8th**	**9th**	**10th**	**11th**	**12th**	**13th**	**14th**	**15th**	Pole	FL
Points	25	20	17	14	12	10	9	8	7	6	5	4	3	2	1	1	1

=== Overall ===
Pos	Driver	Team	(Spain) BAR		(France) DIJ		(Belgium) SPA		(Italy) MIS		(Spain) VAL		(France) LEC		Pts
1	(Finland) Marcus Amand	(France) CLRT Schumacher	6	6	**2**	2	4	4	2	1	2	1	**18**	**1**	208
2	(France) Marvin Klein	(France) ABM	2	3	7	4	DNS	7	1	2	7	3	1	2	187
3	(France) Paul Cauhaupé	(France) ABM	3	2	3	5	5	6	**3**	**3**	8	5	2	3	182
4	(France) Mathys Jaubert	(France) Martinet by Alméras			1	**1**	**2**	**1**	9	5	**1**	**2**	14	Ret	173
5	(France) Louis Perrot	(France) Schumacher CLRT	7	4	4	3	1	2	10	6	9	12	4	Ret	140
6	(Luxembourg) Chester Kieffer	(France) CLRT Schumacher	5	7	9	8	8	3	5	7	5	5	12	4	127
7	(Belgium) Benjamin Paque	(France) TFT Racing	13	5	8	6	11	9	6	10	3	10	3	5	114
8	(South Africa) Keagan Masters	(France) TFT Racing	4	8	6	7	3	5	4	4					99
9	(Andorra) Enzo Joulié	(France) Martinet by Alméras	9	10	13	10	7	8	8	9	6	11	11	6	85
10	(France) Hugo Chevalier	(France) Debard Automobiles by Racetivity	8	9	5	9	15	DNS	7	8	Ret	6	5	10	63
11	(Germany) Theo Oeverhaus	(France) Martinet by Alméras	**1**	**1**											53
12	(France) Jérôme Boullery	(France) Racing Technology	DSQ	13	11	14	9	13	12	19	10	9	9	9	53
13	(France) Marc Guillot	(France) ABM	11	12	15	12	18	11	11	14	8	13	13	11	47
14	(Estonia) Alexander Reimann	(Estonia) EST1 Racing	19†	DNS			6	Ret	13	Ret	4	17	6	7	46
15	(France) Mathys Cappuccio	(France) ABM	10	11	14	16	10	12	14	13	13	11	8	DNS	45
16	(France) Joran Leneutre	(France) Racing Technology	12	14	10	11	17	10	Ret	11	17	14	10	14	40
17	(Switzerland) Karen Gaillard	(France) Schumacher CLRT	14	17	12	13	12	14	15	12	14	7	16	12	37
18	(France) Cyril Caillo	(France) Racing Technology	15	15	16	15	13	15	16	15	12	19	15	13	18
19	(France) Éric Debard	(France) Debard Automobiles by Racetivity	16	16	19	18	Ret	19	18	16	15	15	20	15	4
20	(France) Jean-Philippe Gambaro	(France) ABM	18	18	18	19	16	17	17	Ret	16	18	19	16	2
21	(France) Jordan Boisson	(France) TFT Racing	17	19	17	17	19	16	19	17	18	16	17	17	0
Guest drivers ineligible to score points
—	(Bulgaria) Georgi Dimitrov	(France) TFT Racing											7	8	–
—	(United Kingdom) Graham King	(Belgium) W.D.P Racing Powered by NGT					14	18							–
—	(France) Loïc Teire	(France) GP Racing Team							20	18					–
—	(Estonia) Ragnar Sepp	(Estonia) EST1 Racing									19	20			–
Pos	Driver	Team	(Spain) BAR		(France) DIJ		(Belgium) SPA		(Italy) MIS		(Spain) VAL		(France) LEC		Pts

Colour	Result
Gold	Winner
Silver	Second place
Bronze	Third place
Green	Points classification
Blue	Non-points classification
Blue	Non-classified finish (NC)
Purple	Retired, not classified (Ret)
Red	Did not qualify (DNQ)
Red	Did not pre-qualify (DNPQ)
Black	Disqualified (DSQ)
White	Did not start (DNS)
White	Withdrew (WD)
White	Race cancelled (C)
Blank	Did not practice (DNP)
Blank	Did not arrive (DNA)
Blank	Excluded (EX)

**Bold** – Pole

Italics – Fastest Lap

† — Did not finish, but classified

=== Pro-Am ===
Pos	Driver	Team	(Spain) BAR		(France) DIJ		(Belgium) SPA		(Italy) MIS		(Spain) VAL		(France) LEC	Pts
1	(France) Marc Guillot	(France) ABM	1	1	**2**	**1**	**3**	**1**	**1**	**1**	1	1		241
2	(France) Jérôme Boullery	(France) Racing Technology	**DSQ**	**2**	1	2	1	2	2	3	**1**	**3**		200
3	(France) Cyril Caillo	(France) Racing Technology	2	3	3	3	2	3	3	2	2	3		182
Guest drivers ineligible to score points
—	(Estonia) Ragnar Sepp	(Estonia) EST1 Racing									4	4		–
Pos	Driver	Team	(Spain) BAR		(France) DIJ		(Belgium) SPA		(Italy) MIS		(Spain) VAL		(France) LEC	Pts

=== Am ===
Pos	Driver	Team	(Spain) BAR		(France) DIJ		(Belgium) SPA		(Italy) MIS		(Spain) VAL		(France) LEC	Pts
1	(France) Jordan Boisson	(France) TFT Racing	2	3	1	1	**3**	**1**	**3**	**2**	**3**	**2**		216
2	(France) Éric Debard	(France) Debard Automobiles by Racetivity	1	1	3	2	Ret	2	2	1	1	1		204
3	(France) Jean-Philippe Gambaro	(France) ABM	**3**	**2**	**2**	**3**	2	3	1	Ret	2	3		186
Guest drivers ineligible to score points
—	(United Kingdom) Graham King	(Belgium) W.D.P Racing Powered by NGT					1 (Note: King got the fastest lap in Am class during Race 1 in Spa, but he wasn't eligible to score points, so the fastest lap point was awarded to Gambaro.)	4 (Note: King got the fastest lap in Am class during Race 2 in Spa, but he wasn't eligible to score points, so the fastest lap point was awarded to Boisson.)						–
—	(France) Loïc Teire	(France) GP Racing Team							4	3				–
Pos	Driver	Team	(Spain) BAR		(France) DIJ		(Belgium) SPA		(Italy) MIS		(Spain) VAL		(France) LEC	Pts

=== Rookie ===
Pos	Driver	Team	(Spain) BAR		(France) DIJ		(Belgium) SPA		(Italy) MIS		(Spain) VAL	(France) LEC	Pts
1	(Luxembourg) Chester Kieffer	(France) CLRT Schumacher	5	**7**	9	**8**	**8**	**3**	**5**	**7**			95
2	(Andorra) Enzo Joulié	(France) Martinet by Alméras	9	10	13	10	7	8	8	9			54
3	(France) Joran Leneutre	(France) Racing Technology	**12**	14	**10**	11	17	10	Ret	11			31
4	(France) Mathys Cappuccio	(France) ABM	10	11	14	16	10	12	14	13			28
5	(Switzerland) Karen Gaillard	(France) Schumacher CLRT	14	17	12	13	12	14	15	12			20
Pos	Driver	Team	(Spain) BAR		(France) DIJ		(Belgium) SPA		(Italy) MIS		(Spain) VAL	(France) LEC	Pts

=== Teams ===
Pos	Team	Pts
1	(France) Martinet by Alméras	192
2	(France) ABM	158
3	(France) CLRT Schumacher	151
4	(France) TFT Racing	116
5	(France) Schumacher CLRT	114
6	(France) Debard Automobiles by Racetivity	36
7	(Estonia) EST1 Racing	10
Pos	Team	Pts
