= Schumacher CLRT =

French auto racing team

(France) Schumacher CLRT
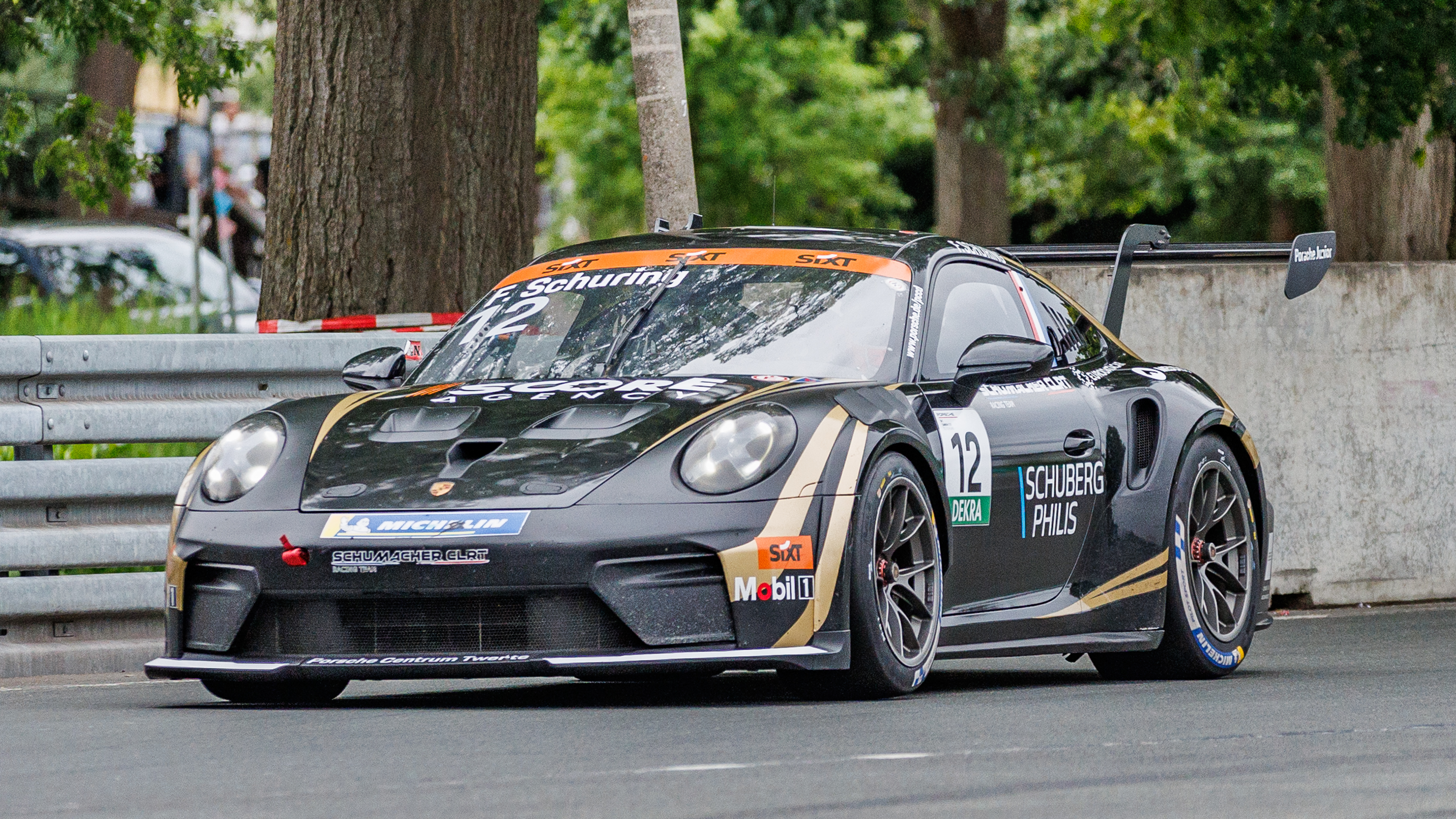
- Founded: 2020
- Founder(s): Côme Ledogar; Tugdual Rabreau
- Former names: CLRT
- Base: Lyon, France
- Team principal(s): Côme Ledogar
- Current series: GT World Challenge Europe; Intercontinental GT Challenge; Porsche Supercup; Porsche Carrera Cup Germany
- Former series: FFSA GT Championship; GT4 European Series; Lamborghini Super Trofeo Europe; Porsche Carrera Cup France; Porsche Sprint Challenge Southern Europe
- Website: https://www.clrt.fr/

Schumacher CLRT is a French auto racing team competing in multiple sports car racing series.

The team was founded in 2020 by French racing drivers Côme Ledogar and Tugdual Rabreau as CLRT. In 2024, French entrepreneur Édouard Schumacher invested into the team, and the team became known as Schumacher CLRT. They have quickly established themselves as one of the most successful teams in Porsche Carrera Cup, amassing eight driver's titles and seven team's titles in just eight years.

== History ==
The team was founded as CLRT in 2020 by French racing drivers Côme Ledogar and Tugdual Rabreau. They entered into the Porsche Carrera Cup France (PCCF) and the Porsche Supercup for the 2020 season. The team signed four drivers full-time, and brought six cars to the first race of the season. Florian Latorre took the team's first ever pole position in its first race in PCCF at Magny-Cours. The team took their first win in the series and in their history courtesy of Latorre at Magny-Cours. Two more wins came during the season from Latorre and Adam Eteki. In Porsche Supercup, Latorre was signed for a full-season program, where he finished fifth in the championship. CLRT had a successful first season in motorsport, rounding off the season third in PCCF and fifth in the supercup.

In 2021, CLRT expanded their program fielding five full-time drivers the in PCCF and resigning Florian Latorre in Porsche Supercup. The season was monumental for the team, as they secured the PCCF driver's title with Marvin Klein and the PCCF team's title.

Klein returned with the team to compete in the 2022 PCCF and Porsche Supercup. In PCCF, Klein became a double champion of the series, and in Supercup, he secured CLRT's first win in the series.

In 2023, the team expanded to the GT World Challenge Europe for a partial schedule. In PCCF, Dorian Boccolacci won four races in a row to secure the driver's title with the team. The team also secured their second team's title in just four seasons.

In early 2024, French entrepreneur Édouard Schumacher, president of Groupe Schumacher, purchased an investment stake into CLRT, and the team rebranded into Schumacher CLRT. Three new programs in the GT4 European Series, French GT4 Cup, and Lamborghini Super Trofeo Europe were added for the season. Despite the added programs, it was another successful year for the team. In PCCF, CLRT won the driver's title with Alessandro Ghiretti alongside a second consecutive team's title. In Supercup, they won their first driver's title with Larry ten Voorde and their first team's title. In their first year of the GT4 European Series, CLRT won the driver's title and team's title in the Am category.

CLRT restructured their operations in 2025, adding a program in the Porsche Carrera Cup Germany (PCCG) with drivers Alessandro Ghiretti and Flynt Schuring at the helm and a partial schedule in the Intercontinental GT Challenge. However, they exited the GT4 European Series, French GT4 Cup, and Lamborghini Super Trofeo Europe after one season. In PCCF, the team took Marcus Amand to the driver's title. Ghiretti also contested the 2025 Porsche Supercup with the team, where he won the driver's championship. CLRT also took home the PCCG and Supercup team's titles that season. 2025 was the team's final season in Porsche Carrera Cup France.

In 2026, the team scaled back their program to two full-time entries in both Porsche Carrera Cup Germany and Porsche Supercup alongside their partial entries in the GT World Challenge Europe and the Intercontinental GT Challenge. CLRT signed Chester Kieffer and Flynt Schuring to dual programs in PCCG and Supercup.

== Current series results ==
=== Porsche Supercup ===
Year	Chassis	Engine	Drivers	Races	Wins	Poles	F. Laps	Podiums	D.C.	Pts	T.C.	Pts
2020	Porsche 991 GT3 Cup	Porsche 4.0 L Flat-6	(France) Adam Eteki	3	0	0	0	0	NC	0	5th	57
2020	Porsche 991 GT3 Cup	Porsche 4.0 L Flat-6	(France) Philippe Haezebrouck	4	0	0	0	0	23rd	0	5th	57
2020	Porsche 991 GT3 Cup	Porsche 4.0 L Flat-6	(France) Florian Latorre	8	0	0	1	2	5th	105	5th	57
2020	Porsche 991 GT3 Cup	Porsche 4.0 L Flat-6	(France) Côme Ledogar	1	0	0	0	0	NC	0	5th	57
2021	Porsche 992 GT3 Cup	Porsche 4.0 L Flat-6	(France) Marvin Klein	4	0	1	0	0	NC	0	5th	91
2021	Porsche 992 GT3 Cup	Porsche 4.0 L Flat-6	(France) Florian Latorre	8	0	0	1	1	8th	61	5th	91
2021	Porsche 992 GT3 Cup	Porsche 4.0 L Flat-6	(France) Steven Palette	5	0	0	0	0	16th	17	5th	91
2022	Porsche 992 GT3 Cup	Porsche 4.0 L Flat-6	(United States) Howard Blank	1	0	0	0	0	NC	0	4th	95
2022	Porsche 992 GT3 Cup	Porsche 4.0 L Flat-6	(New Zealand) Jaxon Evans	1	0	0	0	0	NC	0	4th	95
2022	Porsche 992 GT3 Cup	Porsche 4.0 L Flat-6	(France) Ugo Gazil	1	0	0	0	0	NC	0	4th	95
2022	Porsche 992 GT3 Cup	Porsche 4.0 L Flat-6	(France) Marvin Klein	8	1	2	2	1	6th	78	4th	95
2022	Porsche 992 GT3 Cup	Porsche 4.0 L Flat-6	(France) Clément Mateu	8	0	0	0	0	26th	0	4th	95
2022	Porsche 992 GT3 Cup	Porsche 4.0 L Flat-6	(Belgium) Benjamin Paque	1	0	0	0	0	NC	0	4th	95
2022	Porsche 992 GT3 Cup	Porsche 4.0 L Flat-6	(United Kingdom) Adam Smalley	1	0	0	0	0	NC	0	4th	95
2022	Porsche 992 GT3 Cup	Porsche 4.0 L Flat-6	(France) Evan Spenle	1	0	0	0	0	NC	0	4th	95
2022	Porsche 992 GT3 Cup	Porsche 4.0 L Flat-6	(Netherlands) Michael Verhagen	1	0	0	0	0	NC	0	4th	95
2023	Porsche 992 GT3 Cup	Porsche 4.0 L Flat-6	(France) Dorian Boccolacci	8	0	1	0	1	5th	79	4th	112
2023	Porsche 992 GT3 Cup	Porsche 4.0 L Flat-6	(Belgium) Benjamin Paque	8	0	0	0	0	15th	37	4th	112
2023	Porsche 992 GT3 Cup	Porsche 4.0 L Flat-6	(Netherlands) Michael Verhagen	8	0	0	0	0	23rd	3	4th	112
2024	Porsche 992 GT3 Cup	Porsche 4.0 L Flat-6	(France) Alessandro Ghiretti	8	1	0	0	1	5th	85	1st	272
2024	Porsche 992 GT3 Cup	Porsche 4.0 L Flat-6	(France) Marvin Klein	8	1	2	3	5	3rd	121	1st	272
2024	Porsche 992 GT3 Cup	Porsche 4.0 L Flat-6	(Netherlands) Larry ten Voorde	8	5	4	4	6	1st	168	1st	272
2025	Porsche 992 GT3 Cup	Porsche 4.0 L Flat-6	(France) Alessandro Ghiretti	8	3	1	4	6	1st	130.5	1st	233
2025	Porsche 992 GT3 Cup	Porsche 4.0 L Flat-6	(Netherlands) Flynt Schuring	8	0	2	1	3	3rd	103.5	1st	233
2026	Porsche 992.2 GT3 Cup	Porsche 4.0 L Flat-6	(Luxembourg) Chester Kieffer	8	0	0	0	2	4th	82	1st	214.5
2026	Porsche 992.2 GT3 Cup	Porsche 4.0 L Flat-6	(Netherlands) Flynt Schuring	8	3	2	3	6	1st	132.5	1st	214.5

=== Porsche Carrera Cup Germany ===
Year	Chassis	Engine	Drivers	Races	Wins	Poles	F. Laps	Podiums	D.C.	Pts	T.C.	Pts
2025	Porsche 992 GT3 Cup	Porsche 4.0 L Flat-6	(France) Alessandro Ghiretti	16	4	5	4	9	2nd	262	1st	436
2025	Porsche 992 GT3 Cup	Porsche 4.0 L Flat-6	(Netherlands) Flynt Schuring	16	3	4	1	5	4th	167	1st	436
2026	Porsche 992.2 GT3 Cup	Porsche 4.0 L Flat-6	(Luxembourg) Chester Kieffer	16	2	3	2	3	8th	113	2nd	346
2026	Porsche 992.2 GT3 Cup	Porsche 4.0 L Flat-6	(Netherlands) Flynt Schuring	16	5	6	9	8	2nd	217	2nd	346

== Former series results ==
=== Porsche Carrera Cup France ===
Year	Chassis	Engine	Drivers	Races	Wins	Poles	F. Laps	Podiums	D.C.	Pts	T.C.	Pts
2020	Porsche 991 GT3 Cup	Porsche 4.0 L Flat-6	(France) Philippe Haezebrouck	8	0	0	0	0	23rd	1	3rd	287
2020	Porsche 991 GT3 Cup	Porsche 4.0 L Flat-6	(France) Emil Caumes	10	0	0	0	0	18th	14	3rd	287
2020	Porsche 991 GT3 Cup	Porsche 4.0 L Flat-6	(France) Hugo Chevalier	2	0	0	0	0	NC	0	3rd	287
2020	Porsche 991 GT3 Cup	Porsche 4.0 L Flat-6	(France) Adam Eteki	10	1	0	2	2	6th	134	3rd	287
2020	Porsche 991 GT3 Cup	Porsche 4.0 L Flat-6	(France) François Lansard	10	0	0	0	0	17th	15	3rd	287
2020	Porsche 991 GT3 Cup	Porsche 4.0 L Flat-6	(France) Florian Latorre	10	2	7	2	4	3rd	153	3rd	287
2020	Porsche 991 GT3 Cup	Porsche 4.0 L Flat-6	(France) Tugdual Rabreau	6	0	0	0	0	25th	0	3rd	287
2021	Porsche 992 GT3 Cup	Porsche 4.0 L Flat-6	(France) Henry Hassid	8	0	0	0	0	23rd	6	1st	449
2021	Porsche 992 GT3 Cup	Porsche 4.0 L Flat-6	(France) Marvin Klein	12	6	2	4	9	1st	232	1st	449
2021	Porsche 992 GT3 Cup	Porsche 4.0 L Flat-6	(France) François Lansard	4	0	0	0	0	25th	2	1st	449
2021	Porsche 992 GT3 Cup	Porsche 4.0 L Flat-6	(France) Florian Latorre	12	1	5	4	9	3rd	217	1st	449
2021	Porsche 992 GT3 Cup	Porsche 4.0 L Flat-6	(France) Franck Leherpeur	12	0	0	0	0	26th	2	1st	449
2021	Porsche 992 GT3 Cup	Porsche 4.0 L Flat-6	(France) Steven Palette	2	0	0	0	0	NC	0	1st	449
2021	Porsche 992 GT3 Cup	Porsche 4.0 L Flat-6	(France) Milan Petelet	12	0	0	0	0	11th	52	1st	449
2021	Porsche 992 GT3 Cup	Porsche 4.0 L Flat-6	(France) Tugdual Rabreau	12	0	0	0	0	19th	10	1st	449
2021	Porsche 992 GT3 Cup	Porsche 4.0 L Flat-6	(France) Evan Spenle	12	0	0	0	1	6th	118	1st	449
2022	Porsche 992 GT3 Cup	Porsche 4.0 L Flat-6	(France) Ugo Gazil	5	0	0	0	0	19th	13	2nd	347
2022	Porsche 992 GT3 Cup	Porsche 4.0 L Flat-6	(France) Marvin Klein	12	7	7	7	11	1st	271	2nd	347
2022	Porsche 992 GT3 Cup	Porsche 4.0 L Flat-6	(France) Clément Mateu	12	0	0	0	0	15th	38	2nd	347
2022	Porsche 992 GT3 Cup	Porsche 4.0 L Flat-6	(Belgium) Benjamin Paque	4	0	0	0	0	NC	0	2nd	347
2022	Porsche 992 GT3 Cup	Porsche 4.0 L Flat-6	(France) Evan Spenle	6	0	0	0	1	11th	76	2nd	347
2023	Porsche 992 GT3 Cup	Porsche 4.0 L Flat-6	(France) Dorian Boccolacci	12	5	7	5	9	1st	239	1st	352
2023	Porsche 992 GT3 Cup	Porsche 4.0 L Flat-6	(Belgium) Benjamin Paque	12	0	0	1	5	5th	127	1st	352
2023	Porsche 992 GT3 Cup	Porsche 4.0 L Flat-6	(France) Louis Rousset	12	0	0	0	0	8th	85	1st	352
2024	Porsche 992 GT3 Cup	Porsche 4.0 L Flat-6	(France) Marcus Amand	12	0	0	0	4	4th	151	1st	454
2024	Porsche 992 GT3 Cup	Porsche 4.0 L Flat-6	(France) Paul Cauhaupé	12	0	0	0	1	5th	126	1st	454
2024	Porsche 992 GT3 Cup	Porsche 4.0 L Flat-6	(France) Jean-Phillippe Gambaro	12	0	0	0	0	17th	18	1st	454
2024	Porsche 992 GT3 Cup	Porsche 4.0 L Flat-6	(France) Alessandro Ghiretti	12	9	10	11	12	1st	303	1st	454
2024	Porsche 992 GT3 Cup	Porsche 4.0 L Flat-6	(France) Louis Perrot	12	0	0	1	6	3rd	154	1st	454
2025	Porsche 992 GT3 Cup	Porsche 4.0 L Flat-6	(Finland) Marcus Amand	12	3	3	2	7	1st	208	3rd	154
2025	Porsche 992 GT3 Cup	Porsche 4.0 L Flat-6	(Switzerland) Karen Gaillard	12	0	0	0	0	17th	37	3rd	154
2025	Porsche 992 GT3 Cup	Porsche 4.0 L Flat-6	(Luxembourg) Chester Kieffer	12	0	0	0	1	6th	127	3rd	154
2025	Porsche 992 GT3 Cup	Porsche 4.0 L Flat-6	(France) Louis Perrot	12	1	0	0	3	5th	140	3rd	154

=== GT4 European Series ===
Year	Chassis	Engine	Class	Drivers	Races	Wins	Poles	F. Laps	Podiums	D.C.	Pts	T.C.	Pts
2024	Alpine A110 GT4	Renault M5Pt 1.8 L turbo I4	Am	(France) Laurent Hurgon	12	7	7	5	9	1st	230	1st	230
2024	Alpine A110 GT4	Renault M5Pt 1.8 L turbo I4	Am	(France) Pascal Huteau	12	7	7	5	9	1st	230	1st	230

=== French GT4 Cup ===
Year	Chassis	Engine	Class	Drivers	Races	Wins	Poles	F. Laps	Podiums	D.C.	Pts	T.C.	Pts
2024	Alpine A110 GT4	Renault M5Pt 1.8 L turbo I4	Pro-Am	(France) Grégory Guilvert	12	3	4	0	6	4th	144	1st	211
2024	Alpine A110 GT4	Renault M5Pt 1.8 L turbo I4	Pro-Am	(France) Laurent Hurgon	12	3	4	0	6	4th	144	1st	211
2024	Alpine A110 GT4	Renault M5Pt 1.8 L turbo I4	Pro-Am	(France) Gaspard Simon	12	0	1	0	6	5th	129	1st	211
2024	Alpine A110 GT4	Renault M5Pt 1.8 L turbo I4	Pro-Am	(France) Pascal Huteau	12	0	1	0	6	5th	129	1st	211
