= 2024 French GT4 Cup =

2024 Auto racing championship in France

The 2024 Championnat de France FFSA GT - GT4 France season was the twenty-seventh season of the French FFSA GT Championship and the seventh as the French GT4 Cup, a Sports car championship created and organised by the Stephane Ratel Organisation (SRO). The season began on 28 March in Nogaro and ended on 6 October at Paul Ricard.

== Calendar ==
Round	Circuit	Date
1	Circuit Paul Armagnac, Nogaro, France	28 March—1 April
2	Circuit de Lédenon, Lédenon, France	10–12 May
3	Circuit de Spa-Francorchamps, Stavelot, Belgium	21–23 June
4	Circuit de Nevers Magny-Cours, Magny-Cours, France	23–25 August
5	Circuit de Dijon-Prenois, Prenois, France	13–15 September
6	Circuit Paul Ricard, Le Castellet, France	4–6 October

== Entry list ==
Team	Car	No.	Drivers	Class	Rounds
(Belgium) Street Art Racing	Aston Martin Vantage AMR GT4	1	(Switzerland) Pascal Bachmann	Am	3
(Belgium) Street Art Racing	Aston Martin Vantage AMR GT4	1	(France) Jahid Fazal-Karim	Am	3
(France) Code Racing Development	Alpine A110 GT4	3	(France) Paul Paranthoen	Am	1–2
(France) Code Racing Development	Alpine A110 GT4	3	(France) Aurélien Robineau	Am	1–2
(France) Code Racing Development	Alpine A110 GT4	38	(France) Yves Lemaitre	PA	1–3
(France) Code Racing Development	Alpine A110 GT4	38	(France) Nelson Panciatici	PA	1
(France) Code Racing Development	Alpine A110 GT4	38	(France) Vincent Beltoise	PA	2–3
(France) Mirage Racing	Aston Martin Vantage AMR GT4	5	(Netherlands) Ruben del Sarte	S 1 PA 3	1, 3
(France) Mirage Racing	Aston Martin Vantage AMR GT4	5	(United Kingdom) Josh Milles	S 1 PA 3	1
(France) Mirage Racing	Aston Martin Vantage AMR GT4	5	(Netherlands) Nicolas Siebenschuh	S 1 PA 3	3
(France) Mirage Racing	Aston Martin Vantage AMR GT4 Evo	7	Stanislav Safronov (Note: Safronov and Vaintrub are Russian, but are competing as a neutral competitor as Russian national emblems were banned by the FIA due to the Russian invasion of Ukraine.)	PA	1–3
(France) Mirage Racing	Aston Martin Vantage AMR GT4 Evo	7	Aleksandr Vaintrub	PA	1–3
(Spain) NM Racing Team	Mercedes-AMG GT4	15	(United States) Alexandre Papadopulos	S	3
(Spain) NM Racing Team	Mercedes-AMG GT4	15	(Spain) Lluc Ibáñez	S	3
(France) VSF Sports - Amplitude Automobiles	BMW M4 GT4 Gen II	18	(France) Natan Bihel	PA	1–3
(France) VSF Sports - Amplitude Automobiles	BMW M4 GT4 Gen II	18	(France) Paul Lanchère	PA	1–3
(France) VSF Sports - Amplitude Automobiles	BMW M4 GT4 Gen II	41	(France) Gregory Curson Faessel	Am	1–3
(France) VSF Sports - Amplitude Automobiles	BMW M4 GT4 Gen II	41	(France) Florian Teillais	Am	1–3
(France) Debard Automobiles by Racetivity	BMW M4 GT4 Gen II	21	(France) Simon Gachet	PA	1–3
(France) Debard Automobiles by Racetivity	BMW M4 GT4 Gen II	21	(France) Carla Debard	PA	1–3
(France) L'Espace Bienvenue	BMW M4 GT4 Gen II	87	(France) Jim Pla	PA	1–2
(France) L'Espace Bienvenue	BMW M4 GT4 Gen II	87	(France) Jean-Luc Beaubelique	PA	1–2
(France) JSB Compétition	Porsche 718 Cayman GT4 RS Clubsport	24	(France) Florian Briché	S	1–3
(France) JSB Compétition	Porsche 718 Cayman GT4 RS Clubsport	24	(France) Viny Beltramelli	S	1–3
(France) JSB Compétition	Porsche 718 Cayman GT4 RS Clubsport	43	(France) Jean-Laurent Navarro	Am	1
(France) JSB Compétition	Porsche 718 Cayman GT4 RS Clubsport	46	(France) Wilfried Cazalbon	Am	2
(France) JSB Compétition	Porsche 718 Cayman GT4 RS Clubsport	46	(France) Jean-Laurent Navarro	Am	2–3
(France) Team CMR	Ginetta G56 GT4	29	(France) Hugo Bac	S	1–3
(France) Team CMR	Ginetta G56 GT4	29	(France) Hugo Mogica	S	1–3
(France) Team CMR	Ginetta G56 GT4	30	(France) Jordan Roupnel	S	1–2
(France) Team CMR	Ginetta G56 GT4	30	(France) Loris Cabirou	S	1
(France) Team CMR	Ginetta G56 GT4	30	(Switzerland) Shannon Lugassy	S	2
(France) Team CMR	Ginetta G56 GT4	30	(Belgium) Frédéric Bouvy	PA	3
(France) Team CMR	Ginetta G56 GT4	30	(Belgium) Ulysse de Pauw	PA	3
(France) Team CMR	Alpine A110 GT4	63	(Belgium) Stéphane Lémeret	Am	1–3
(France) Team CMR	Alpine A110 GT4	63	(France) Stéphane Auriacombe	Am	1–3
(France) Chazel Technologie Course	Alpine A110 GT4	33	(France) Mateo Herrero	S	1–3
(France) Chazel Technologie Course	Alpine A110 GT4	33	(Belgium) Lorens Lecertua	S	1
(France) Chazel Technologie Course	Alpine A110 GT4	33	(France) Tom Verdier	S	2–3
(France) Saintéloc Junior Team	Audi R8 LMS GT4 Evo	42	(France) Sébastien Rambaud	Am	1–3
(France) Saintéloc Junior Team	Audi R8 LMS GT4 Evo	42	(France) Marc Rostan	Am	1
(France) Schumacher CLRT	Alpine A110 GT4	55	(France) Grégory Guilvert	PA	1–3
(France) Schumacher CLRT	Alpine A110 GT4	55	(France) Laurent Hurgon	PA	1–3
(France) Schumacher CLRT	Alpine A110 GT4	110	(France) Gaspard Simon	PA	1–3
(France) Schumacher CLRT	Alpine A110 GT4	110	(France) Pascal Huteau	PA	1–3
(France) Vic'Team	Mercedes-AMG GT4	64	(France) Eric Trémoulet	PA	1–3
(France) Vic'Team	Mercedes-AMG GT4	64	(France) Olivier Jouffret	PA	1–3
(Switzerland) Racing Spirit of Léman	Aston Martin Vantage AMR GT4 Evo	74	(France) Victor Weyrich	S	1–3
(Switzerland) Racing Spirit of Léman	Aston Martin Vantage AMR GT4 Evo	74	(Ecuador) Mateo Villagomez	S	1–3
(Switzerland) Racing Spirit of Léman	Aston Martin Vantage AMR GT4 Evo	92	(France) Ronald Basso	Am	1–3
(Switzerland) Racing Spirit of Léman	Aston Martin Vantage AMR GT4 Evo	92	(France) Clément Dub	Am	1–3
(France) AV Racing	Porsche 718 Cayman GT4 RS Clubsport	75	(France) Thomas Laurent	PA	1–3
(France) AV Racing	Porsche 718 Cayman GT4 RS Clubsport	75	(France) Noam Abramczyk	PA	1–3
(France) AV Racing	Porsche 718 Cayman GT4 RS Clubsport	99	(France) Mateo Salomone	Am	1–3
(France) AV Racing	Porsche 718 Cayman GT4 RS Clubsport	99	(France) Rudy Servol	Am	1–3
(United Kingdom) Elite Motorsport with Entire Race Engineering	McLaren Artura GT4	77	(United Kingdom) Tom Lebbon	S	3
(United Kingdom) Elite Motorsport with Entire Race Engineering	McLaren Artura GT4	77	(Republic of Ireland) Alex Denning	S	3
(France) CSA Racing	Audi R8 LMS GT4 Evo	111	(France) Gael Castelli	PA	1–3
(France) CSA Racing	Audi R8 LMS GT4 Evo	111	(France) Rodolphe Wallgren	PA	1–3

Icon	Class
S	Silver Cup
PA	Pro-Am Cup
Am	Am Cup

== Results ==
Bold indicates the overall winner.

Round		Circuit	Date	Pole position	Silver Winners	Pro-Am Winners	Am Winners
1	R1	(France) Circuit Paul Armagnac	31 March	(France) No. 64 Vic'Team	(France) No. 33 Chazel Technologie Course	(France) No. 111 CSA Racing	**(France) No. 99 AV Racing**
1	R1	(France) Circuit Paul Armagnac	31 March	(France) Eric Trémoulet (France) Olivier Jouffret	(Belgium) Lorens Lecertua (France) Mateo Herrero	(France) Gael Castelli (France) Rodolphe Wallgren	**(France) Mateo Salomone** **(France) Rudy Servol**
1	R2	(France) Circuit Paul Armagnac	1 April	(France) No. 30 Team CMR	(France) No. 30 Team CMR	**(France) No. 111 CSA Racing**	(France) No. 43 JSB Compétition
1	R2	(France) Circuit Paul Armagnac	1 April	(France) Loris Cabirou (France) Jordan Roupnel	(France) Loris Cabirou (France) Jordan Roupnel	**(France) Gael Castelli** **(France) Rodolphe Wallgren**	(France) Jean-Laurent Navarro
2	R1	(France) Circuit de Lédenon	11 May	(France) No. 111 CSA Racing	(Switzerland) No. 74 Racing Spirit of Léman	**(France) No. 64 Vic'Team**	(France) No. 99 AV Racing
2	R1	(France) Circuit de Lédenon	11 May	(France) Gael Castelli (France) Rodolphe Wallgren	(France) Victor Weyrich (Ecuador) Mateo Villagomez	**(France) Olivier Jouffret** **(France) Eric Trémoulet**	(France) Mateo Salomone (France) Rudy Servol
2	R2	(France) Circuit de Lédenon	12 May	(France) No. 33 Chazel Technologie Course	(Switzerland) No. 74 Racing Spirit of Léman	**(France) No. 75 AV Racing**	(Switzerland) No. 92 Racing Spirit of Léman
2	R2	(France) Circuit de Lédenon	12 May	(France) Tom Verdier (France) Mateo Herrero	(France) Victor Weyrich (Ecuador) Mateo Villagomez	**(France) Noam Abramczyk** **(France) Thomas Laurent**	(France) Ronald Basso (France) Clément Dub
3	R1	(Belgium) Circuit de Spa-Francorchamps	22 June	(France) No. 111 CSA Racing	(Switzerland) No. 74 Racing Spirit of Léman	**(France) No. 55 Schumacher CLRT**	(France) No. 99 AV Racing
3	R1	(Belgium) Circuit de Spa-Francorchamps	22 June	(France) Gael Castelli (France) Rodolphe Wallgren	(France) Victor Weyrich (Ecuador) Mateo Villagomez	**(France) Grégory Guilvert** **(France) Laurent Hurgon**	(France) Mateo Salomone (France) Rudy Servol
3	R2	(Belgium) Circuit de Spa-Francorchamps	23 June	(France) No. 55 Schumacher CLRT	(Spain) No. 15 NM Racing Team	**(France) No. 30 Team CMR**	(France) No. 63 Team CMR
3	R2	(Belgium) Circuit de Spa-Francorchamps	23 June	(France) Grégory Guilvert (France) Laurent Hurgon	(United States) Alexandre Papadopulos (Spain) Lluc Ibáñez	**(Belgium) Frédéric Bouvy** **(Belgium) Ulysse de Pauw**	(France) Stéphane Auriacombe (Belgium) Stéphane Lémeret
4	R1	(France) Circuit de Nevers Magny-Cours	24 August	(France) No. 110 Schumacher CLRT	(France) No. 29 Team CMR	**(France) No. 64 Vic'Team**	(France) No. 63 Team CMR
4	R1	(France) Circuit de Nevers Magny-Cours	24 August	(France) Pascal Huteau (France) Gaspard Simon	(France) Hugo Bac (France) Hugo Mogica	**(France) Olivier Jouffret** **(France) Eric Trémoulet**	(France) Stéphane Auriacombe (Belgium) Stéphane Lémeret
4	R2	(France) Circuit de Nevers Magny-Cours	25 August	(France) No. 64 Vic'Team	(Switzerland) No. 74 Racing Spirit of Léman	**(France) No. 75 AV Racing**	(France) No. 63 Team CMR
4	R2	(France) Circuit de Nevers Magny-Cours	25 August	(France) Eric Trémoulet (France) Olivier Jouffret	(France) Victor Weyrich (Ecuador) Mateo Villagomez	**(France) Noam Abramczyk** **(France) Thomas Laurent**	(France) Stéphane Auriacombe (Belgium) Stéphane Lémeret
5	R1	(France) Circuit de Dijon-Prenois	14 September	(France) No. 55 Schumacher CLRT	**(France) No. 29 Team CMR**	(France) No. 64 Vic'Team	(France) No. 41 VSF Sports - Amplitude Automobiles
5	R1	(France) Circuit de Dijon-Prenois	14 September	(France) Grégory Guilvert (France) Laurent Hurgon	**(France) Hugo Bac** **(France) Hugo Mogica**	(France) Olivier Jouffret (France) Eric Trémoulet	(France) Gregory Curson Faessel (France) Florian Teillais
5	R2	(France) Circuit de Dijon-Prenois	15 September	(France) No. 55 Schumacher CLRT	**(France) No. 29 Team CMR**	(France) No. 64 Vic'Team	(France) No. 99 AV Racing
5	R2	(France) Circuit de Dijon-Prenois	15 September	(France) Grégory Guilvert (France) Laurent Hurgon	**(France) Hugo Bac** **(France) Hugo Mogica**	(France) Olivier Jouffret (France) Eric Trémoulet	(France) Mateo Salomone (France) Rudy Servol
6	R1	(France) Circuit Paul Ricard	5 October	(France) No. 64 Vic'Team	(Switzerland) No. 74 Racing Spirit of Léman	**(France) No. 55 Schumacher CLRT**	(France) No. 99 AV Racing
6	R1	(France) Circuit Paul Ricard	5 October	(France) Eric Trémoulet (France) Olivier Jouffret	(France) Victor Weyrich (Ecuador) Mateo Villagomez	**(France) Grégory Guilvert** **(France) Laurent Hurgon**	(France) Mateo Salomone (France) Rudy Servol
6	R2	(France) Circuit Paul Ricard	6 October	(France) No. 29 Team CMR	(Switzerland) **No. 74 Racing Spirit of Léman**	(France) No. 55 Schumacher CLRT	(France) No. 42 Saintéloc Racing
6	R2	(France) Circuit Paul Ricard	6 October	(France) Hugo Bac (France) Loris Cabirou	**(France) Victor Weyrich** **(Ecuador) Mateo Villagomez**	(France) Grégory Guilvert (France) Laurent Hurgon	(France) Sébastien Rambaud

== Championship standings ==
=== Drivers' Championship ===
==== Silver Cup ====
Pos.	Drivers	Team	NOG (France)		LED (France)		SPA (Belgium)		MAG (France)		DIJ (France)		LEC (France)		Points
1	(France) Victor Weyrich	(Switzerland) Racing Spirit of Léman	15	5	**5**	5	5	8	7	**6**	3	7	4	1	246
1	(Ecuador) Mateo Villagomez	(Switzerland) Racing Spirit of Léman	15	5	**5**	5	5	8	7	**6**	3	7	4	1	246
2	(France) Mateo Herrero	(France) Chazel Technologie Course	2	7	6	**14†**	18	9	**10**	Ret	5	6	6	6	173
3	(France) Florian Briché	(France) JSB Compétition	3	8	14†	9	10	15	13	9	6	5	8	9	164
3	(France) Viny Beltramelli	(France) JSB Compétition	3	8	14†	9	10	15	13	9	6	5	8	9	164
4	(France) Hugo Bac	(France) Team CMR	**5**	13	7	Ret	6	Ret	6	Ret	**1**	**1**	**Ret**	**2**	154
5	(France) Hugo Mogica	(France) Team CMR	**5**	13	7	Ret	6	Ret	6	Ret	**1**	**1**			134
6	(France) Tom Verdier	(France) Chazel Technologie Course			6	**14†**	18	9	**10**	Ret	5	6	6	6	133
7	(France) Loris Cabirou	(France) Team CMR	6	**2**									**Ret**	**2**	58
8	(Belgium) Lorens Lecertua	(France) Chazel Technologie Course	2	7											40
9	(France) Jordan Roupnel	(France) Team CMR	6	**2**	Ret	Ret									38
10	(United States) Alexandre Papadopulos	(Spain) NM Racing Team					**13**	7							36
10	(Spain) Lluc Ibáñez	(Spain) NM Racing Team					**13**	7							36
11	(France) Baudouin Detout	(Switzerland) Racing Spirit of Léman											5	7	30
11	(Denmark) Oskar Kristensen	(Switzerland) Racing Spirit of Léman											5	7	30
12	(United Kingdom) Tom Lebbon	(United Kingdom) Elite Motorsport with Entire Race Engineering					7	**12**							28
12	(Republic of Ireland) Alex Denning	(United Kingdom) Elite Motorsport with Entire Race Engineering					7	**12**							28
13	(France) Alexandre Bochez	(France) CSA Racing									16	17			20
13	(France) Mikaël Bochez	(France) CSA Racing									16	17			20
14	(Belgium) Nathan Vanspringel	(Belgium) TeamFloral-Vanspringel											9	21	16
14	(Belgium) Nico Verdonck	(Belgium) TeamFloral-Vanspringel											9	21	16
15	(France) Matteo Nomblot	(France) Team CMR											23	12	16
15	(France) Emmanuel Reviriault	(France) Team CMR											23	12	16
16	(Netherlands) Ruben del Sarte	(France) Mirage Racing	Ret	12											10
16	(United Kingdom) Josh Milles	(France) Mirage Racing	Ret	12											10
–	(Switzerland) Shannon Lugassy	(France) Team CMR			Ret	Ret									–
Pos.	Drivers	Team	NOG (France)		LED (France)		SPA (Belgium)		MAG (France)		DIJ (France)		LEC (France)		Points

==== Pro-Am Cup ====
Pos.	Drivers	Team	NOG (France)		LED (France)		SPA (Belgium)		MAG (France)		DIJ (France)		LEC (France)		Points
1	(France) Gael Castelli	(France) CSA Racing	4	1	**3**	2	**2**	2	4	3	14	4	7	8	203
1	(France) Rodolphe Wallgren	(France) CSA Racing	4	1	**3**	2	**2**	2	4	3	14	4	7	8	203
2	(France) Olivier Jouffret	(France) Vic'Team	**16**	**Ret**	1	**8**	Ret	4	1	**4**	2	2	**2**	14	167
2	(France) Eric Trémoulet	(France) Vic'Team	**16**	**Ret**	1	**8**	Ret	4	1	**4**	2	2	**2**	14	167
3	(France) Noam Abramczyk	(France) AV Racing	19†	11	Ret	1	3	5	14	1	4	8	3	4	153
3	(France) Thomas Laurent	(France) AV Racing	19†	11	Ret	1	3	5	14	1	4	8	3	4	153
4	(France) Grégory Guilvert	(France) Schumacher CLRT	7	Ret	DNS	17†	1	**3**	16	5	**17**	**3**	1	**3**	144
4	(France) Laurent Hurgon	(France) Schumacher CLRT	7	Ret	DNS	17†	1	**3**	16	5	**17**	**3**	1	**3**	144
5	(France) Pascal Huteau	(France) Schumacher CLRT	8	19	2	3	4	17	**3**	2	13	16	21†	5	129
5	(France) Gaspard Simon	(France) Schumacher CLRT	8	19	2	3	4	17	**3**	2	13	16	21†	5	129
6	Stanislav Safronov	(France) Mirage Racing	10	Ret	8	6	8	11	8	8	10	12	15	13	94
6	Aleksandr Vaintrub	(France) Mirage Racing	10	Ret	8	6	8	11	8	8	10	12	15	13	94
7	(France) Carla Debard	(France) Debard Automobiles by Racetivity	9	3	4	15	12	Ret	12	10	8	Ret	14	23	86
7	(France) Simon Gachet	(France) Debard Automobiles by Racetivity	9	3	4	15	12	Ret	12	10	8	Ret	14	23	86
8	(France) Jean-Luc Beaubelique	(France) L'Espace Bienvenue	17	4	13	16†			2	7	11	10	10	24†	85
8	(France) Jim Pla	(France) L'Espace Bienvenue	17	4	13	16†			2	7	11	10	10	24†	85
9	(France) Natan Bihel	(France) VSF Sports - Amplitude Automobiles	14	6	12	4	16	20†	5	16	Ret	11	17	22	67
9	(France) Paul Lanchère	(France) VSF Sports - Amplitude Automobiles	14	6	12	4	16	20†	5	16	Ret	11	17	22	67
10	(France) Yves Lemaitre	(France) Code Racing Development	18†	14	Ret	7	Ret	10			15	15	16	15	44
11	(France) Vincent Beltoise	(France) Code Racing Development			Ret	7	Ret	10			15	15	16	15	34
12	(Belgium) Frédéric Bouvy	(France) Team CMR					9	1							33
12	(Belgium) Ulysse de Pauw	(France) Team CMR					9	1							33
13	(France) Nelson Panciatici	(France) Code Racing Development	18†	14											10
14	(Netherlands) Ruben del Sarte	(France) Mirage Racing					17	Ret					18	17	7
15	(Canada) Fred Roberts	(France) Mirage Racing											18	17	5
16	(France) Thomas Compain	(France) Team CMR							15	15†					4
16	(France) Emmanuel Reviriault	(France) Team CMR							15	15†					4
17	(Netherlands) Nicolas Siebenschuh	(France) Mirage Racing					17	Ret							2
Pos.	Drivers	Team	NOG (France)		LED (France)		SPA (Belgium)		MAG (France)		DIJ (France)		LEC (France)		Points

==== Am Cup ====
Pos.	Drivers	Team	NOG (France)		LED (France)		SPA (Belgium)		MAG (France)		DIJ (France)		LEC (France)		Points
1	(France) Mateo Salomone	(France) AV Racing	1	10	9	**Ret**	11	**16**	**17**	12	12	**9**	11	16	222
1	(France) Rudy Servol	(France) AV Racing	1	10	9	**Ret**	11	**16**	**17**	12	12	**9**	11	16	222
2	(France) Stéphane Auriacombe	(France) Team CMR	11	15	Ret	18†	**Ret**	6	9	**11**	**9**	13	12	**11**	193
2	(Belgium) Stéphane Lémeret	(France) Team CMR	11	15	Ret	18†	**Ret**	6	9	**11**	**9**	13	12	**11**	193
3	(France) Gregory Curson Faessel	(France) VSF Sports - Amplitude Automobiles	13	16	11	11	Ret	13	11	13	7	14	13	20	171
3	(France) Florian Teillais	(France) VSF Sports - Amplitude Automobiles	13	16	11	11	Ret	13	11	13	7	14	13	20	171
4	(France) Sébastien Rambaud	(France) Saintéloc Junior Team	Ret	18	Ret	13	15	21†					**19**	10	78
5	(France) Jean-Laurent Navarro	(France) JSB Compétition	Ret	**9**	10	12	Ret	18							69
6	(France) Jahid Fazal-Karim	(Belgium) Street Art Racing					19	22†	18	14			20	18	62
7	(France) Ronald Basso	(Switzerland) Racing Spirit of Léman	**12**	17	**Ret**	10	Ret	19							60
7	(France) Clément Dub	(Switzerland) Racing Spirit of Léman	**12**	17	**Ret**	10	Ret	19							60
8	(Switzerland) Pascal Bachmann	(Belgium) Street Art Racing							18	14			20	18	46
9	(France) Wilfried Cazalbon	(France) JSB Compétition			10	12	Ret	18							43
10	(Mexico) Andy Cantu	(Spain) NM Racing Team					14	14							33
10	(Spain) Alberto de Martin	(Spain) NM Racing Team					14	14							33
11	(France) Julien Goujat	(France) Saintéloc Junior Team					15	21†							21
12	(France) Mathieu Casalonga	(France) JSB Compétition											22	19	18
13	(France) Marc Rostan	(France) Saintéloc Junior Team	Ret	18											8
14	(France) Paul Paranthoen	(France) Code Racing Development	Ret	20†											6
14	(France) Aurélien Robineau	(France) Code Racing Development	Ret	20†											6
Pos.	Drivers	Team	NOG (France)		LED (France)		SPA (Belgium)		MAG (France)		DIJ (France)		LEC (France)		Points

Colour	Result
Gold	Winner
Silver	Second place
Bronze	Third place
Green	Points classification
Blue	Non-points classification
Blue	Non-classified finish (NC)
Purple	Retired, not classified (Ret)
Red	Did not qualify (DNQ)
Red	Did not pre-qualify (DNPQ)
Black	Disqualified (DSQ)
White	Did not start (DNS)
White	Withdrew (WD)
White	Race cancelled (C)
Blank	Did not practice (DNP)
Blank	Did not arrive (DNA)
Blank	Excluded (EX)

**Bold** indicates pole position

=== Teams' Championship ===
==== Silver Cup ====
Pos.	Team	NOG (France)	LED (France)	SPA (Belgium)	MAG (France)	DIJ (France)	LEC (France)	Points
Pos.	Team	NOG (France)	LED (France)	SPA (Belgium)	MAG (France)	DIJ (France)	LEC (France)	Points

==== Pro-Am Cup ====
Pos.	Team	NOG (France)	LED (France)	SPA (Belgium)	MAG (France)	DIJ (France)	LEC (France)	Points
Pos.	Team	NOG (France)	LED (France)	SPA (Belgium)	MAG (France)	DIJ (France)	LEC (France)	Points

==== Am Cup ====
Pos.	Team	NOG (France)	LED (France)	SPA (Belgium)	MAG (France)	DIJ (France)	LEC (France)	Points
Pos.	Team	NOG (France)	LED (France)	SPA (Belgium)	MAG (France)	DIJ (France)	LEC (France)	Points

Colour	Result
Gold	Winner
Silver	Second place
Bronze	Third place
Green	Points classification
Blue	Non-points classification
Blue	Non-classified finish (NC)
Purple	Retired, not classified (Ret)
Red	Did not qualify (DNQ)
Red	Did not pre-qualify (DNPQ)
Black	Disqualified (DSQ)
White	Did not start (DNS)
White	Withdrew (WD)
White	Race cancelled (C)
Blank	Did not practice (DNP)
Blank	Did not arrive (DNA)
Blank	Excluded (EX)

**Bold** indicates pole position

== See also ==
- 2024 British GT Championship
- 2024 GT4 European Series
- 2024 GT4 America Series
- 2024 GT4 Australia Series
- 2024 GT World Challenge Asia
