= Enzo Joulié =

French racing driver (born 2004)

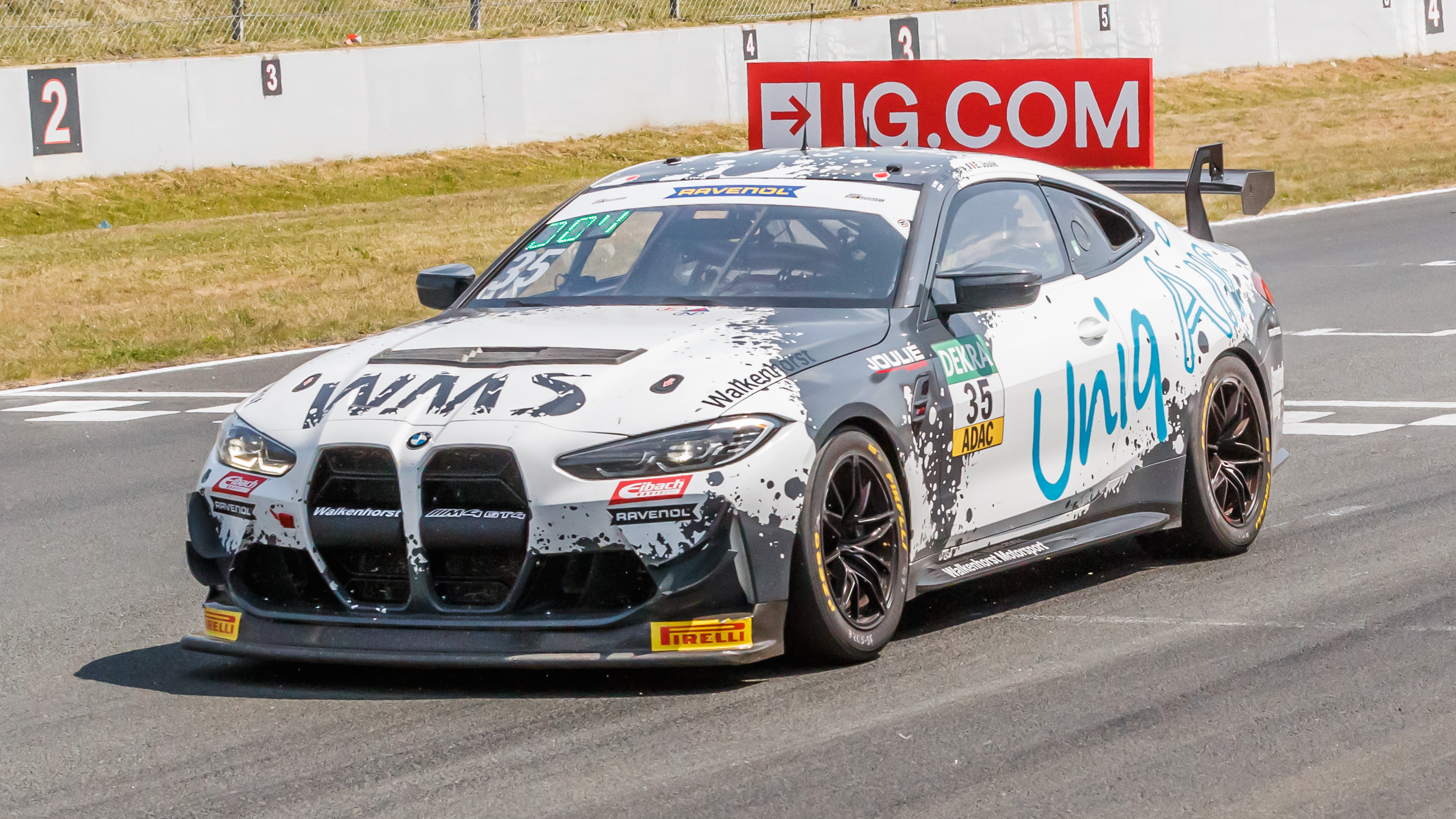
- Joulié competing in ADAC GT4 Germany in 2023
- Nationality: (France) French (Andorra) Andorran (Note: Joulié is a French citizen living in Andorra. Since 2024, he has represented Andorra internationally.)
- Born: 17 May 2004 (age 22) Cournonsec, France

GT4 European Series career
- Debut season: 2021
- Current team: Borusan Otomotiv Motorsport
- Categorisation: FIA Silver
- Car number: 11
- Former teams: CD Sport, NM Racing Team
- Starts: 33 (34 entries)
- Wins: 2
- Podiums: 5
- Poles: 1
- Fastest laps: 1
- Best finish: 2nd in 2022

Previous series
- 2020: F4 Spanish Championship

Enzo Joulié (born 17 May 2004) is an Andorran-based French racing driver currently competing in Porsche Carrera Cup France for Martinet by Alméras. He was previously GT4 European Series runner-up in 2022 and FFSA GT champion in 2023.

== Personal life ==
Joulié is a resident of La Massana, Andorra.

== Racing record ==
=== Racing career summary ===
Season	Series	Team	Races	Wins	Poles	F/Laps	Podiums	Points	Position
2019	French F4 Championship	FFSA Academy	3	0	0	0	0	0	NC†
2020	F4 Spanish Championship	MP Motorsport	21	0	1	0	0	37	13th
2021	GT4 European Series - Silver	CD Sport	12	0	0	0	0	34	13th
2021	French GT4 Cup - Silver	AKKA ASP Team	12	1	?	?	4	138	5th
2022	GT4 European Series - Silver	NM Racing Team	12	3	1	1	6	156	**2nd**
2022	French GT4 Cup - Silver	AKKODIS ASP Team	10	2	1	1	4	92	5th
2023	GT4 European Series - Silver	Borusan Otomotiv Motorsport	11	0	0	0	0	48	12th
2023	French GT4 Cup - Silver	Matmut Évolution	12	3	3	?	10	204	**1st**
2023	ADAC GT4 Germany	Walkenhorst Motorsport	12	0	0	1	1	66	12th
2024	GT4 European Series - Silver	TGR Team Matmut Évolution	12	1	1	0	2	74	7th
2024	ADAC GT4 Germany	BWT Mücke Motorsport	12	1	0	0	4	112	5th
2025	Porsche Carrera Cup France	Martinet by Alméras	12	0	0	0	0	85	9th
2025	Porsche Supercup	Martinet by Alméras	1	0	0	0	0	0	NC†
2025	Ultimate Cup European Series - GT Endurance Cup - Porsche Cup	Martinet by Alméras							
2025	Ultimate Cup European Series - GT Endurance Cup - Porsche Cup	Seb Lajoux Racing							
2025–26	24H Series Middle East - 992	Seb Lajoux Racing	1	0	0	0	1	0	NC†
2026	Porsche Carrera Cup France	Martinet by Alméras	12	1	0	0	3	144	4th
2026	24H Series - 992	Seb Lajoux Racing							
2026	GT Cup Open Europe	Stéphane Perrin							

^{†} As Joulié was a guest driver, he was ineligible to score points.
* Season still in progress.

=== Complete F4 Spanish Championship results ===
(key) (Races in bold indicate pole position) (Races in italics indicate fastest lap)

Year	Team	1	2	3	4	5	6	7	8	9	10	11	12	13	14	15	16	17	18	19	20	21	DC	Points
2020	MP Motorsport	NAV; 1; 10	NAV; 2; 14	NAV; 3; 16	LEC; 1 Ret	LEC; 2; 12	LEC; 3; 14	**JER**; **1**; 7	JER; 2; 6	JER; 3; 16	CRT; 1; 12	CRT; 2 Ret	CRT; 3; 8	ARA; 1; 9	ARA; 2; 11	ARA; 3; 8	JAR; 1; 9	JAR; 2; 8	JAR; 3; 6	CAT; 1; 13	CAT; 2; 14	CAT; 3; 15	13th	37

=== Complete GT4 European Series results ===
(key) (Races in bold indicate pole position) (Races in italics indicate fastest lap)

Year	Team	Car	Class	1	2	3	4	5	6	7	8	9	10	11	12	Pos	Points
2021	CD Sport	Mercedes-AMG GT4	Silver	MNZ; 1; 22	MNZ; 2; 6	LEC; 1; 36	LEC; 2; 10	ZAN; 1; 7	ZAN; 2; 10	SPA; 1 Ret	SPA; 2; 30	NÜR; 1; 19	NÜR; 2; 24	CAT; 1; 22	CAT; 2; 33†	13th	34
2022	NM Racing Team	Mercedes-AMG GT4	Silver	IMO; 1; 38	IMO; 2; 24	LEC; 1; 3	**LEC**; **2**; 3	**MIS**; **1**; 10	**MIS**; **2**; 1	SPA; 1; 5	SPA; 2; 3	HOC; 1; 1	HOC; 2; 28	CAT; 1; 8	CAT; 2; 13	2nd	156
2023	Borusan Otomotiv Motorsport	BMW M4 GT4 Gen II	Silver	MNZ; 1; 5	MNZ; 2; 5	LEC; 1; 22	LEC; 2; 34	SPA; 1; 10	SPA; 2; 19	MIS; 1; 7	MIS; 2; 4	HOC; 1; 27	HOC; 2 DNS	CAT; 1; 7	CAT; 2 Ret	12th	48
2024	TGR Team Matmut Évolution	Toyota GR Supra GT4 Evo	Silver	**LEC**; **1**; 1	LEC; 2; 2	MIS; 1; 6	MIS; 2; 37†	SPA; 1 Ret	SPA; 2; 12	HOC; 1 Ret	HOC; 2; 25	MNZ; 1; 5	MNZ; 2; 6	JED; 1; 11	JED; 2; 9	7th	74

=== Complete Porsche Carrera Cup France results ===
(key) (Races in bold indicate pole position) (Races in italics indicate fastest lap)

Year	Team	1	2	3	4	5	6	7	8	9	10	11	12	Pos	Points
2025	Martinet by Alméras	CAT; 1; 9	CAT; 2; 10	DIJ; 1; 13	DIJ; 2; 10	SPA; 1	SPA; 2	MIS; 1	MIS; 2	VAL; 1	VAL; 2	LEC; 1	LEC; 2	11th*	22*

^{*}Season still in progress.
