= Daniel Nilsson =

Swedish footballer

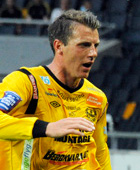

Personal information
- Full name: Daniel Nilsson
- Date of birth: 21 September 1982 (age 44)
- Place of birth: Sölvesborg, Sweden
- Height: 1.83 m (6 ft 0 in)
- Position: Midfielder

Team information
- Current team: Sölvesborgs GoIF
- Number: 8

Youth career
- –1997: Sölvesborgs GoIF
- 1998–2001: Helsingborgs IF

Senior career*
Years	Team	Apps	(Gls)
2002–2016	Mjällby AIF	326	(12)
2016–	Sölvesborgs GoIF	0	(0)

International career
1999–2000	Sweden U18	13	(3)
- * Club domestic league appearances and goals as of 10 January 2012

Daniel Nilsson (born 21 September 1982) is a Swedish footballer who plays for Sölvesborgs GoIF as a midfielder.
