= Caio Collet =

Brazilian racing driver (born 2002)

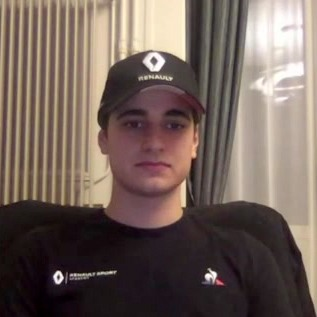
- Collet in 2020
- Nationality: (Brazil) Brazilian
- Born: 3 April 2002 (age 24); São Paulo, Brazil

IndyCar Series career
- 18 races run over 1 year
- Team: No. 4 (A. J. Foyt Enterprises)
- Best finish: 24th (2026)
- First race: 2026 Firestone Grand Prix of St. Petersburg
- Last race: 2026 Mission Grand Prix of Monterey (Laguna Seca)
Wins	Podiums	Poles
0	0	0

Caio Jotta Collet (born 3 April 2002) is a Brazilian racing driver who competes in the IndyCar Series for A. J. Foyt Racing.

Born and raised in São Paulo, Collet began his single-seater career in 2018, winning the French F4 title that year. He then moved up to Formula Renault Eurocup for two years and finished runner-up in 2020, before racing in FIA Formula 3 from 2021 to 2023, taking three wins. He then switched to Indy NXT with HMD Motorsports for 2024 and finished third, and placed runner-up the year after.

Collet served as the reserve and simulator driver for the Nissan Formula E Team, making his Formula E debut with Nissan at the 2024 Portland ePrix. He is a former member of the Alpine Academy and the Winfield Racing School.

== Junior racing career ==
=== Karting ===
Collet began his career in karting at the age of seven, claiming multiple titles in his native Brazil, before moving to Europe where his performances led him to being signed to the Birel ART team in 2016 and eventually Nicolas Todt's All Road Management scheme.

=== Lower formulas ===
At the start of 2018, Collet made his single-seater debut for Silberpfeil Energy Dubai in the 2017–18 Formula 4 UAE Championship. Collet impressed as he finished his first race in third position behind Leon Köhler and David Schumacher, Collet only competed in the third and fourth rounds of the season however in those seven races he finished on the podium in every race bar one. It included winning the third race at the Yas Marina Circuit. This amounted in 124 points and 6th position in the championship standings.

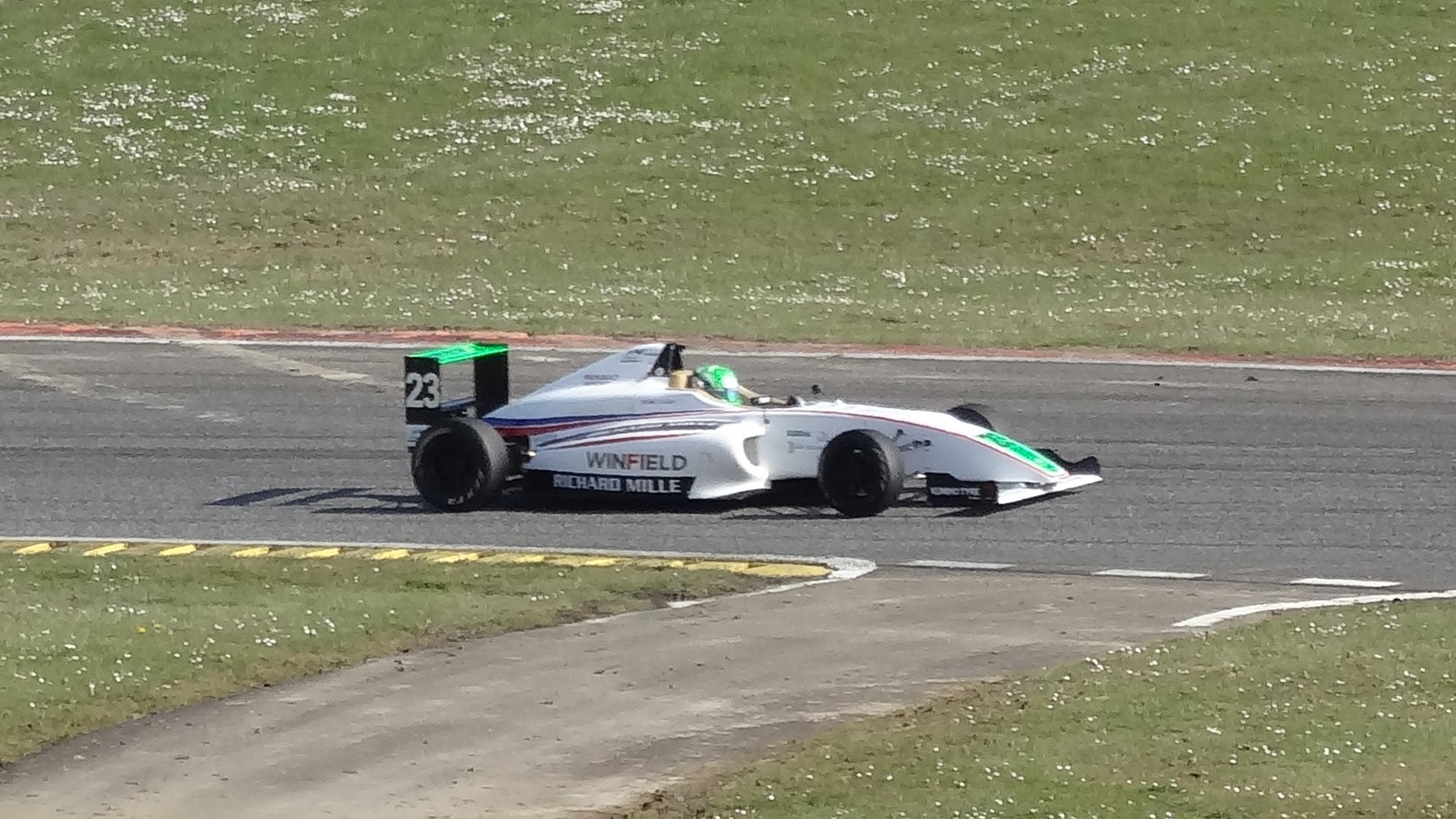
Collet racing in the 2018 French F4 Championship.

Racing under the number 23, Collet was the only Brazilian on the French F4 grid in 2018. Collet finished the first four races on the podium including taking his first of seven wins that season at the Pau Grand Prix. Multiple wins followed, and Collet sat 54.5 points in the lead of the standings following Magny Cours. Collet had the opportunity to win the championship a round early at Jerez, In the first race, Collet took pole and slowly built is advantage over Adam Eteki who qualified second. The race ended with Collet first, title rival Arthur Leclerc second and guest driver Alessandro Ghiretti finished third. In the reverse grid race, Collet started tenth due to his win the round previously where he climbed through the field to finish fifth between Ulysse de Pauw and Leclerc. A dominant final race which he won confirmed his place as champion regardless of where his rivals finished that race. Collet collected 303.5 points that season along with eleven podiums and three pole positions, he finished with 66.5 more than closest championship rival Ugo de Wilde.

=== Formula Renault Eurocup ===
==== 2019 ====
Due to his success in the 2018 French F4 Championship, Collet was given a drive in the 2019 Formula Renault Eurocup championship with R-ace GP alongside Oscar Piastri, Aleksandr Smolyar and Grégoire Saucy. Collet finished on the podium for the first time in round three at Monaco where he finished third. Collet would go on to finish the season with five podiums, the best of which was second place at Spa-Francorchamps. Collet finished fifth in the standings with 207 points which was 113 points behind champion and teammate Oscar Piastri.

==== 2020 ====
Collet would remain with R-ace GP for the 2020 season. His season started out in strong fashion, with three podiums in the first three races, which included his first Eurocup victory at the Imola Circuit. Though at the third round at the Nürburgring the Brazilian missed out on the podium altogether, as his former Renault stablemate Victor Martins took both wins. The next few rounds would see first and second-place finishes from Collet and Martins at Magny-Cours and Zandvoort respectively, however, at the Circuit de Barcelona-Catalunya, Martins was able to regain control of the championship with two victories. The seventh event of the season at Spa-Francorchamps was even worse for Collet's title hopes, as, for the first time in four rounds he didn't end up on the rostrum, whilst his rival did. In round eight at Imola Collet bounced back and won race one, but was taken out from second place on the first lap by David Vidales, losing more ground to the French ART driver. And although Collet won race one at Hockenheim, he wasn't able to get any closer to Martins in the standings, due to a mechanical issue in the second race. At the penultimate race of the season Martins clinched the title, with 44 points splitting Martins and Collet at the end of the year.

=== Toyota Racing Series ===
Collet competed in the 2020 Toyota Racing Series for MTEC Motorsport. At the first race he almost had the perfect race with pole, fastest lap and the race win however he performed a practice start on the formation lap meaning his win was inherited to Kiwi Liam Lawson as Collet got a five-second penalty meaning he finished seventh. Collet eventually won a race at the next round at Teretonga Park, which was his first and only victory and podium that campaign. Collet finished seventh with 219 points.

=== FIA Formula 3 ===
In October 2020, Collet joined the post-season test at Catalunya partaking with MP Motorsport on the second day and placed tenth in the afternoon session. Later that month, Collet joined reigning team champions Prema Racing for the first day of the second post-season test at Jerez.

==== 2021 ====
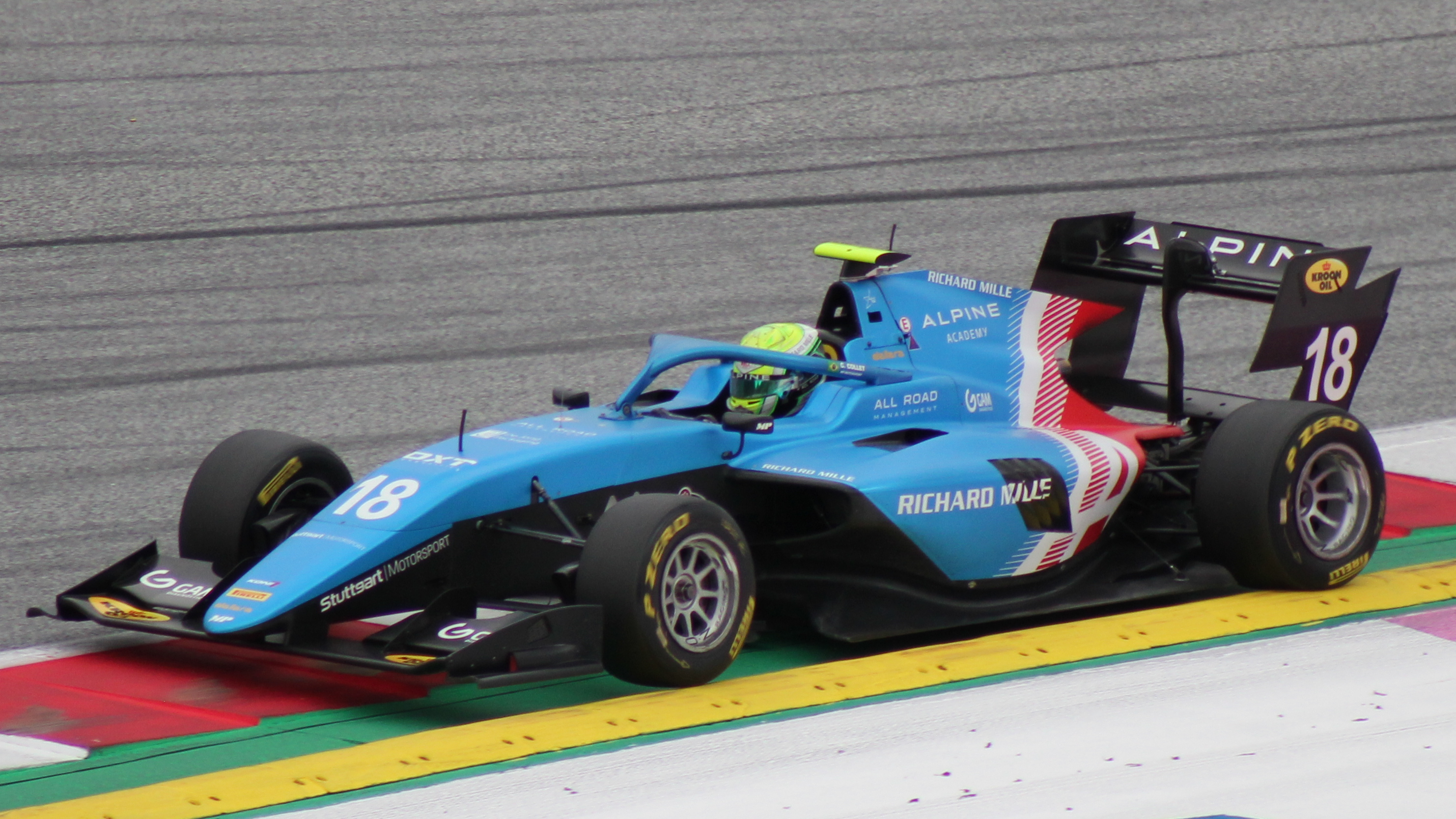
Collet driving the Dallara F3 2019 during the 2021 Spielberg Formula 3 round.

On 10 February 2021, it was announced that Collet would race for MP Motorsport in the 2021 season, partnering Formula Renault title rival Victor Martins and Dutchman Tijmen van der Helm. Similar to his 2020 season, Collet's campaign would start with third place in Barcelona having qualified tenth, after which he went on to score two further points finishes in that round, it being fifth and eighth place. The following round in France Collet qualified fifth, but had disappointing sprint races, finishing thirteenth in the first and stalling his car during the second. However, he scored his maiden podium in a feature race, earning himself fifteen points through another third place. At Spielberg, he improved his personal best qualifying to fourth. Just like the previous round, his Saturday was disappointing, a track limits penalty demoted him from sixth in the first race, and a mistake costed him points in the second. In the feature race, Collet stalled once again, but made a sterling drive, climbing to seventh place by the chequered flag.

Collet had a disappointing weekend in Budapest, he failed to score following a poor 26th in qualifying. Collet again qualified fourth at Spa. After finishing fifth in the first race, he was penalised five seconds and dropped to ninth after being deemed to overtake off-track. He would finish Race 2 and Race 3 in fourth place. In Zandvoort he qualified sixth, and finished all the races in the top-five, but did not make the podium. In the Sochi finale, he scored another fifth place in Race 1 but his points streak ended due to a collision on the first lap in Race 3. Collet ended his rookie F3 campaign in ninth place with 93 points and two podiums, was second-highest of all rookies, and was just four places behind teammate Martins.

==== 2022 ====
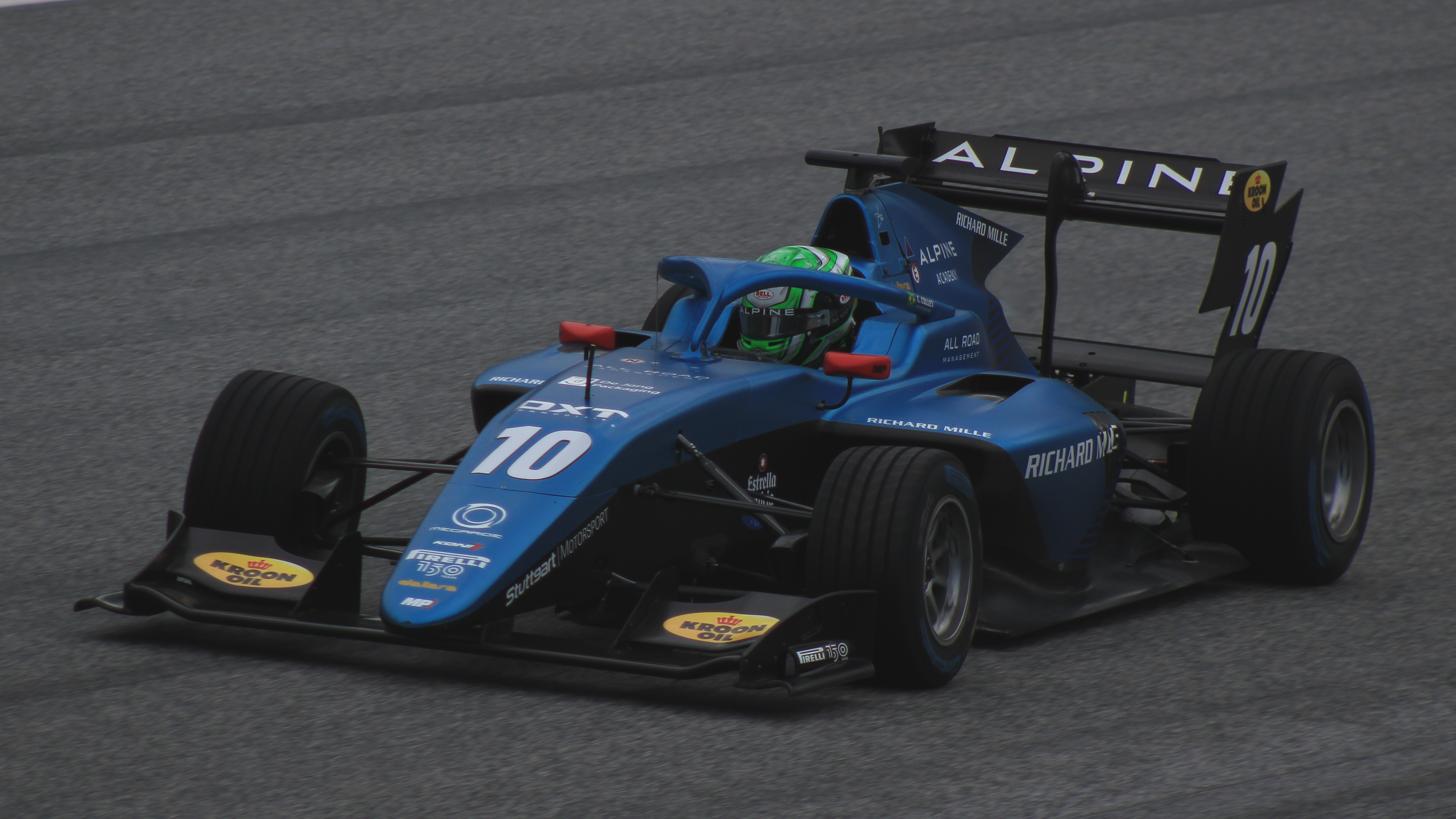
Collet driving for MP Motorsport during the 2022 Spielberg Formula 3 round.

Collet was retained by MP Motorsport for the 2022 season, partnering Alexander Smolyar and Kush Maini, stating he aimed to "lead the team" in his sophomore season. Collet barely missed reverse pole in Bahrain, but managed to make his way to seventh place. His feature race was not so lucky however, as his suspension broke going off-track while avoiding a slow Zane Maloney. After qualifying ninth in Imola, Collet claimed the lead of the sprint race early on, but was overtaken on the final lap by Franco Colapinto. Moments later, Collet's race came to an abrupt end after being tagged by Isack Hadjar. In the feature, Collet gambled on wet tyres on a damp track to take the lead early on, but was forced to pit after the track quickly dried up. He eventually finished the race in eleventh place. In Barcelona, he broke his duck and scored his first podium of the year, overtaking Juan Manuel Correa with three laps to go. He finished seventh in the feature race, where he started.

Collet qualified fourth in Silverstone. After failing to score in the sprint, Collet secured fourth place in the feature race, having lost the final podium position to Oliver Bearman on the penultimate lap. After qualifying on reverse pole in Austria, despite being overtaken by Juan Manuel Correa later on the opening lap, he would be back in the lead after Correa's car. Still, a first win eluded him once Jak Crawford dispatched him on lap fourteen, yet Collet still finished in a personal best second place. However, in the feature race, after a tight battle with Zane Maloney, Collet took himself out of the race by tagging Jonny Edgar, causing a multi-car collision. Collet qualified ninth in Hungary. In a wet sprint race, Collet battled with Colapinto for the lead, until a mistake from Colapinto gave Collet the lead. He duly stormed off following that, securing his maiden F3 victory by eight seconds.

Collet took pole for the first time in Spa-Francorchamps. After scoring a point in the sprint race, Collet battled with Maloney for the lead on the opening lap, where he went off-track and rejoined unsafely, earning him a five-second penalty. He eventually fell to third, and was demoted to sixth place with the penalty applied. In Zandvoort, he qualified ninth and in the sprint race, made an electric start to move from fourth to second. He later dispatched Correa to take the lead, and his second win. In the feature race, he finished sixth, continuing his late resurgence in form. In Monza, Collet started second in the sprint race, and managed to finish third after passing Jonny Edgar on the penultimate lap. Collet ended the year eighth in the standings collecting 88 points, whilst amassing two wins and five podiums.

==== 2023 ====
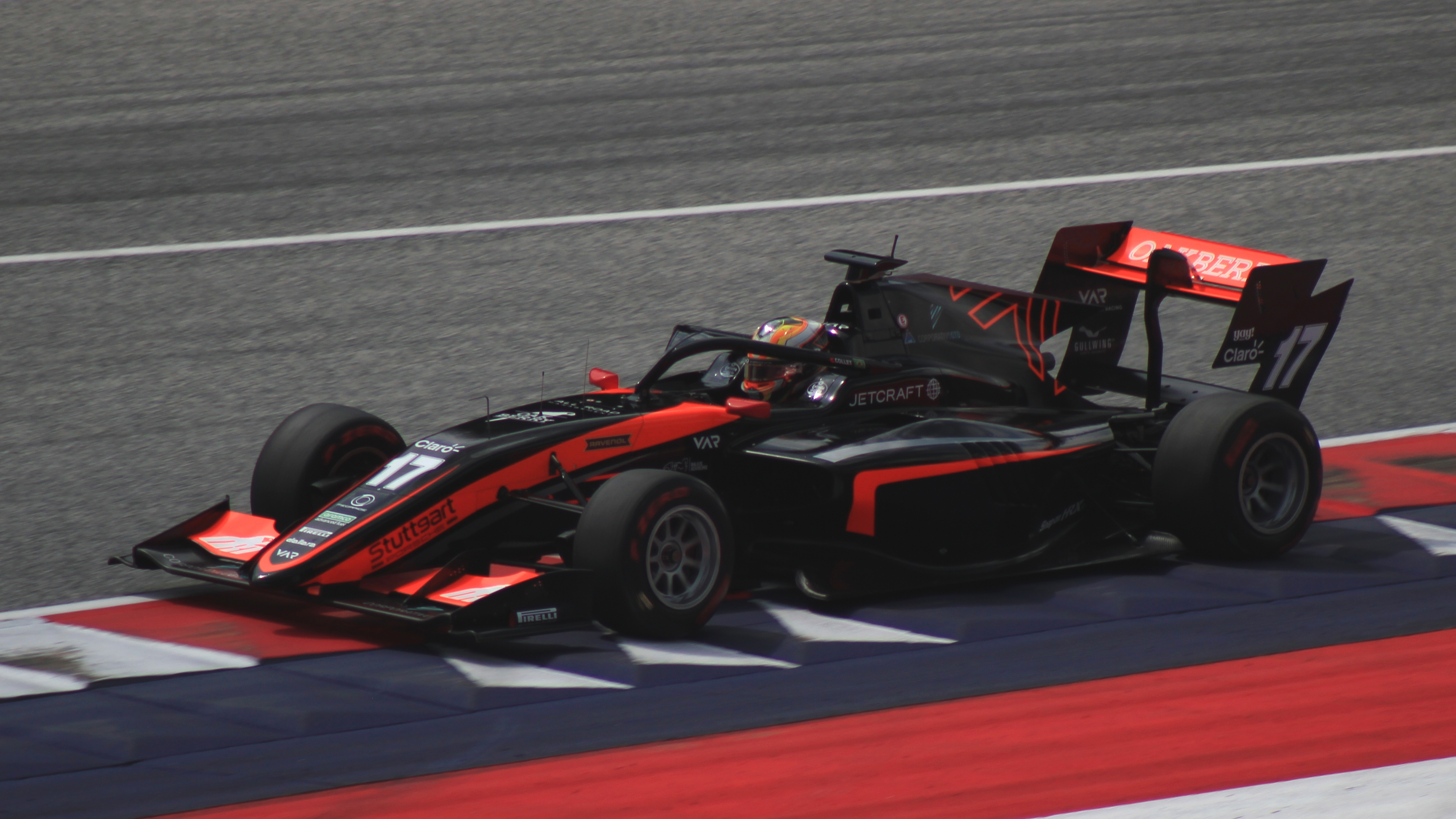
Collet driving for Van Amersfoort Racing during the 2023 Spielberg Formula 3 round.

Despite not appearing in the previous year's post-season test, Collet switched to Van Amersfoort Racing for his third Formula 3 season in 2023. Collet started his season in Bahrain positively, with a third place during the sprint race. In Melbourne he qualified in the top-ten, but in the sprint race was unfortunate to be taken out whilst battling for the lead, sustaining a puncture from battling Paul Aron. His woes continued on Sunday, while running in eighth place, he was hit from behind by Dino Beganovic. Collet again suffered a puncture and concluded luckless weekend in sixteenth. Collet returned to the points in ninth during the Monaco sprint race. In the feature race, however, Collet was taken out again after contact with Sebastián Montoya while fighting for fifth.

In Austria, Collet qualified in fifth. He returned to the podium in third during the sprint race, having fought past Pepe Martí and defending a charge from Zak O'Sullivan. In the feature race, Collet inherited third on the last lap after Franco Colapinto and Montoya collided, concluding a successful weekend. In Silverstone, Collet charged from 17th to fourth during a damp race, narrowly missing a third straight podium to Christian Mansell. In the feature race, he hit trouble on the opening lap, being hit by Jonny Edgar and fell to the back. He amazingly recovered to ninth, only for the points to be receded due to a penalty overtaking a car off-track.

In Spa-Francorchamps, Collet shot from fourth to second in the sprint race, before sweeping past Taylor Barnard for the lead at the end of the opening lap and proceeding to win the race. In the feature race, Collet started on dry tyres which proved to be the wrong choice on a damp track, and he was well outside the points. However, the track dried up in the dying laps and Collet advanced to fifth place, the leading car on dry tyres, even pipping Montoya on the line. Collet qualified second during the Monza finale. He had a forgetful sprint race, being the cause of a multi-lap incident in which he managed to keep going, but he finished down in nineteenth. In the feature race, he battled intensely with Jonny Edgar for the lead, but instead would slip back to fourth by the end. Collet ended the year ninth in the standings with 73 points, taking a win and three other podiums.

=== Indy NXT ===
==== 2024 season ====
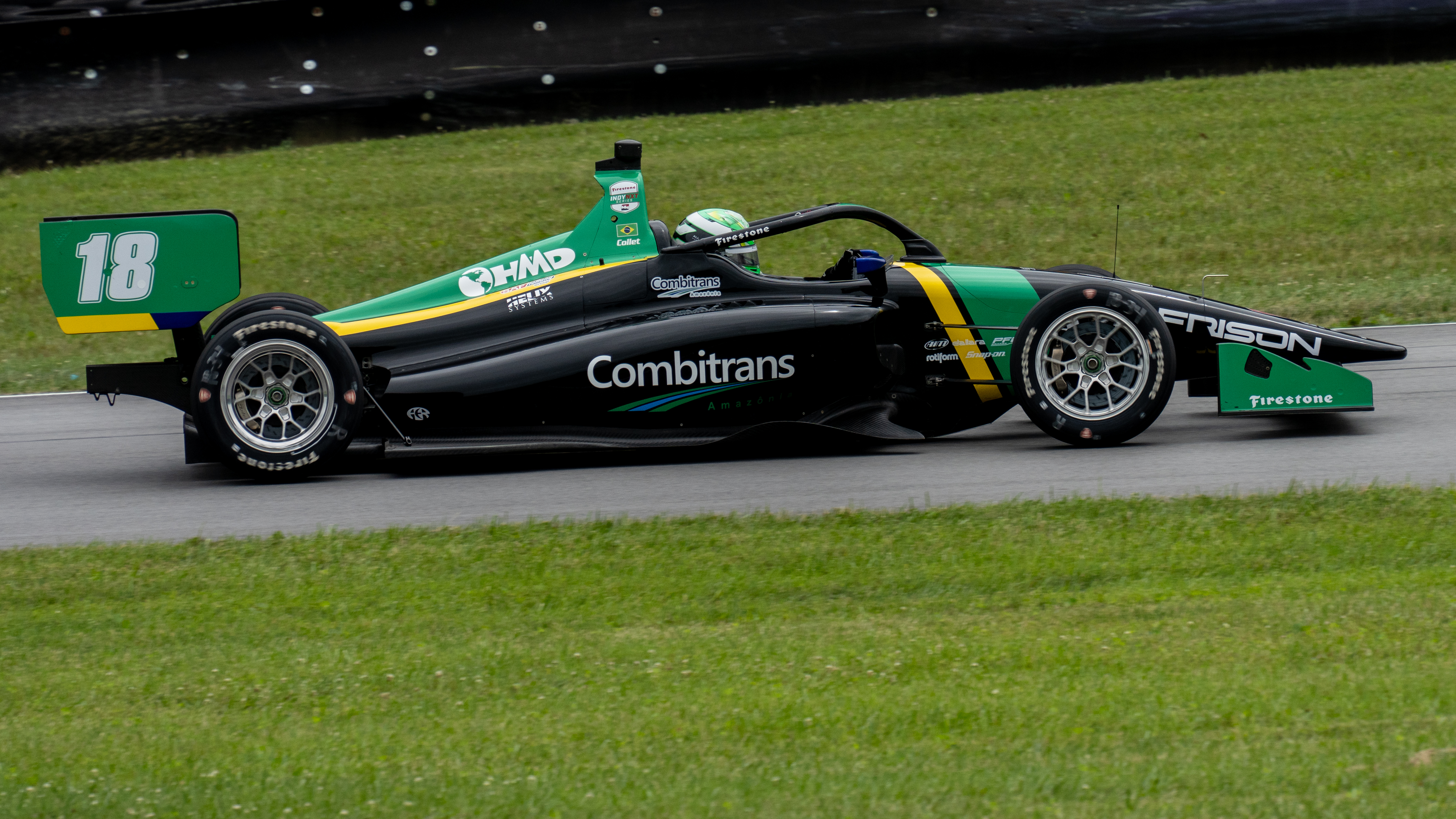
Collet practicing at Mid-Ohio during the 2024 Indy NXT season

In October 2023, Collet took part in the Indy NXT's Chris Griffis Memorial Test at Indianapolis, driving for HMD Motorsports. After partaking in two more pre-season tests with the team at Barber Motorsports Park and Sebring, he was announced as the final addition to HMD's nine-driver lineup for the 2024 season. Starting the campaign with top-ten finishes, Collet did not take long to earn his maiden podium in the series with a third place at the Indianapolis Motor Speedway. This was followed by a second place in Detroit, and a double runner-up finish for the round in Laguna Seca. In Mid-Ohio, Collet stormed to his maiden pole, and brought home his first win in the series following a controlling drive. Unfortunately, two successive retirements followed, but he rounded the season with third place during the Nashville season finale. With a total of one win, six podiums and 436 points, Collet ended third in the standings, as well as being the highest rookie.

==== 2025 season ====
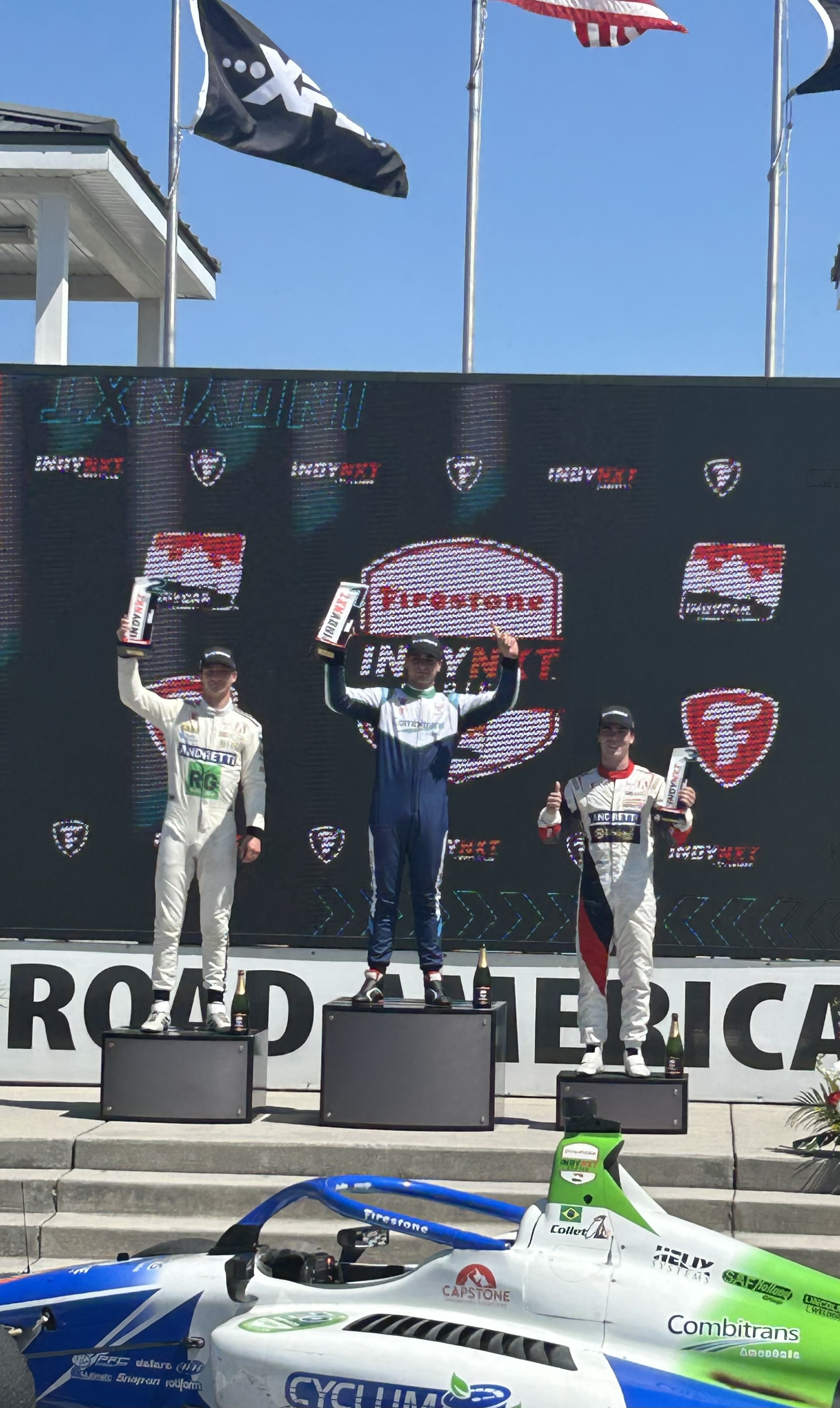
Collet on the podium after winning at Road America in 2025

Collet re-signed with HMD Motorsports for the 2025 season. He started the season with third in Saint Petersburg but retired in Barber Motorsports Park with a throttle issue. This was followed by a second-place finish in Indianapolis, and replicated this result with another runner-up finish in Detroit. After a third place in Gateway Motorsports Park, Collet earned his win at Road America, having passed Dennis Hauger with five laps to go. He continued his momentum with another second place in Mid-Ohio, having failed to challenge Hauger throughout the race. He proceeded to have a dominant weekend in the Laguna Seca double-header, taking pole and a lights-to-flag victory in both races which hauled him into title contention against Hauger. He earned a third straight pole in Portland, but lost out to a fast starting Hauger at the start, ultimately having to settle for second place. A failure to make the rostrum in the final two races effectively his title hopes; nevertheless Collet finished the season runner-up to Hauger by 72 points, taking three wins, three poles and nine podiums.

=== Formula One ===
In 2019, Collet was signed by the Renault Sport Academy. He had his first taste of a Formula One car in the 2012 Lotus E20, during a demo run at Ibirapuera Park. Collet was included in the academy's line-up when it was rebranded to the Alpine Academy in 2021. At the start of 2023, he was dropped from the academy. Despite that, Collet explained that he was "still linked to Alpine" and is "still in contact".

== IndyCar career ==
In October 2025, Collet experienced his first IndyCar test in Mid-Ohio, driving for A. J. Foyt Racing.

=== A. J. Foyt Racing (2026–) ===
==== 2026 season ====
The following month, it was revealed that Collet will drive the No. 4 for A. J. Foyt Racing for the 2026 season.

== Formula E ==
=== Nissan Formula E Team (2024) ===
In January 2024, Collet was named as the reserve and simulator driver for the Nissan Formula E Team. He made his debut in Formula E machinery by partaking in the rookie free practice session at the 2024 Misano ePrix for Nissan. Collet would further also drive for them during the Rookie Test following the Berlin ePrix at the Tempelhof Airport Street Circuit.

Collet opted not to remain in the Nissan reserve driver role for 2025, stating that he preferred to solely focus on his main Indy NXT campaign.

==== 2023–24 season ====
Collet made his race debut at the 2024 Portland ePrix, deputising for the unwell Oliver Rowland. He finished the races in a respectable eighteenth and sixteenth, in which during the latter race Collet even finished ahead of his more experienced teammate Sacha Fenestraz.

== Personal life ==
Collet was born in São Paulo and labelled late three-time Formula One champion Ayrton Senna as his racing hero. He has Italian and French ancestry.

== Karting record ==
=== Karting career summary ===
Season	Series	Team	Position
2012	500 Milas de Kart — Mini Max		2nd
2012	500 Milas de Kart — Cadete		2nd
2013	Copa Brasil de Kart — Júnior Menor	SP	2nd
2014	Copa Brasil de Kart — Júnior Menor		2nd
2014	Florida Winter Tour — Rotax Mini Max		2nd
2015	Florida Winter Tour — Rotax Junior		5th
2015	Florida Winter Tour — Junior ROK		23rd
2015	WSK Super Master Series — KFJ	Kosmic Racing Dept.	31st
2015	CIK-FIA European Championship — KFJ	Kosmic Racing Dept.	6th
2015	CIK-FIA World Championship — KFJ	Kosmic Racing Dept.	3rd
2015	Rotax Max Challenge Grand Finals — Junior	Renato Russo	3rd
2016	WSK Champions Cup — OKJ	Birel ART Racing Srl	23rd
2016	WSK Super Master Series — OKJ	Birel ART Racing Srl	4th
2016	CIK-FIA European Championship — OKJ	Birel ART Racing Srl	6th
2016	WSK Final Cup — OKJ	Birel ART Racing Srl	27th
2016	CIK-FIA World Championship — OKJ	Birel ART Racing Srl	NC
2017	South Garda Winter Cup — OK	Birel ART Racing Srl	34th
2017	WSK Champions Cup — OK	Birel ART Racing Srl	31st
2017	WSK Super Master Series — OK	Birel ART Racing Srl	15th
2017	Coupe de France — OK	Birel ART Racing Srl	8th
2017	CIK-FIA European Championship — OK	Birel ART Racing Srl	28th
2017	CIK-FIA World Championship — OK	Birel ART Racing Srl	25th
2017	SKUSA SuperNationals — X30 Senior		15th

== Racing record ==
=== Racing career summary ===
Season	Series	Team	Races	Wins	Poles	F/Laps	Podiums	Points	Position
2017–18	Formula 4 UAE Championship	Silberpfeil Energy Dubai	7	1	2	3	6	124	6th
2018	French F4 Championship	FFSA Academy	20	7	3	7	13	303.5	**1st**
2018	ADAC F4 Championship	Prema Theodore Racing	3	0	0	0	0	18	16th
2019	Formula Renault Eurocup	R-ace GP	20	0	0	0	6	207	5th
2020	Formula Renault Eurocup	R-ace GP	20	5	3	4	12	304	**2nd**
2020	Toyota Racing Series	mtec motorsport	15	1	1	2	1	219	7th
2021	FIA Formula 3 Championship	MP Motorsport	20	0	0	0	2	93	9th
2022	FIA Formula 3 Championship	MP Motorsport	18	2	1	2	5	88	8th
2023	FIA Formula 3 Championship	Van Amersfoort Racing	18	1	0	1	4	73	9th
2023–24	Formula E	Nissan Formula E Team	2	0	0	0	0	0	28th
2024	Indy NXT	HMD Motorsports	14	1	1	3	6	436	**3rd**
2025	Indy NXT	HMD Motorsports	14	3	3	4	9	527	**2nd**
2026	IndyCar Series	A. J. Foyt Enterprises	18	0	0	0	0	203	24th
2026	Stock Car Pro Series	TMG Racing	1	0	0	0	0	0	NC*

* Season still in progress.

=== Complete Formula 4 UAE Championship results ===
(key) (Races in bold indicate pole position; races in italics indicate fastest lap)

Year	Team	1	2	3	4	5	6	7	8	9	10	11	12	13	14	15	16	17	18	19	20	21	22	23	24	DC	Points
2017–18	Silberpfeil Energy Dubai	YMC1; 1	YMC1; 2	YMC1; 3	YMC1; 4	YMC2; 1	YMC2; 2	YMC2; 3	YMC2; 4	DUB1; 1; 3	DUB1; 2; 2	DUB1; 3; 4	DUB1; 4 C	**YMC3**; **1**; 2	YMC3; 2; 2	**YMC3**; **3**; 1	YMC3; 4; 2	YMC4; 1	YMC4; 2	YMC4; 3	YMC4; 4	DUB2; 1	DUB2; 2	DUB2; 3	DUB2; 4	6th	124

=== Complete French F4 Championship results ===
(key) (Races in bold indicate pole position) (Races in italics indicate fastest lap)

Year	1	2	3	4	5	6	7	8	9	10	11	12	13	14	15	16	17	18	19	20	21	Pos	Points
2018	NOG; 1; 3	NOG; 2; 2	NOG; 3; 3	**PAU**; **1**; 1	PAU; 2; 6	**PAU**; **3**; 1	SPA; 1 Ret	SPA; 2; 4	**SPA**; **3**; 2	DIJ; 1; 4	DIJ; 2; 4	DIJ; 3; 1	**MAG**; **1**; 1	MAG; 2; 3	**MAG**; **3**; 1	**JER**; **1**; 1	JER; 2; 5	**JER**; **3**; 1	LEC; 1; 3	LEC; 2; 4	LEC; 3; 5	1st	303.5

=== Complete ADAC Formula 4 Championship results ===
(key) (Races in bold indicate pole position) (Races in italics indicate fastest lap)

Year	Team	1	2	3	4	5	6	7	8	9	10	11	12	13	14	15	16	17	18	19	20	Pos	Points
2018	Prema Theodore Racing	OSC; 1	OSC; 2	OSC; 3	HOC; 1	HOC; 2	HOC; 3	LAU; 1	LAU; 2	LAU; 3	RBR; 1	RBR; 2	RBR; 3	HOC; 1	HOC; 2	NÜR; 1	NÜR; 2	NÜR; 3	HOC; 1; 14	HOC; 2; 5	HOC; 3; 6	16th	18

=== Complete Formula Renault Eurocup results ===
(key) (Races in bold indicate pole position) (Races in italics indicate fastest lap)

Year	Team	1	2	3	4	5	6	7	8	9	10	11	12	13	14	15	16	17	18	19	20	Pos	Points
2019	R-ace GP	MNZ; 1; 12	MNZ; 2; 7	SIL; 1; 5	SIL; 2; 4	MON; 1; 3	MON; 2; 4	LEC; 1; 5	LEC; 2; 4	SPA; 1; 8	SPA; 2; 2	NÜR; 1; 6	NÜR; 2; 3	HUN; 1; 4	HUN; 2; 4	CAT; 1; 4	CAT; 2; 7	HOC; 1; 3	HOC; 2; 3	YMC; 1; 8	YMC; 2; 3	5th	207
2020	R-ace GP	MNZ; 1; 3	MNZ; 2; 1	IMO; 1; 2	IMO; 2; 5	NÜR; 1; 6	NÜR; 2; 4	**MAG**; **1**; 1	MAG; 2; 2	ZAN; 1; 2	**ZAN**; **2**; 1	CAT; 1; 2	CAT; 2; 2	SPA; 1; 7‡	SPA; 2; 6	IMO; 1; 1	IMO; 2 Ret	**HOC**; **1**; 1	HOC; 2 Ret	LEC; 1; 2	LEC; 2; 4	2nd	304

^{‡} Half points awarded as less than 75% of race distance was completed.

=== Complete Toyota Racing Series results ===
(key) (Races in bold indicate pole position) (Races in italics indicate fastest lap)

Year	Team	1	2	3	4	5	6	7	8	9	10	11	12	13	14	15	DC	Points
2020	M2 Competition	**HIG**; **1**; 7	HIG; 2 Ret	HIG; 3 DNS	TER; 1; 1	TER; 2; 8	TER; 3; 5	HMP; 1; 4	HMP; 2; 6	HMP; 3; 4	PUK; 1 Ret	PUK; 2; 14	PUK; 3; 7	MAN; 1; 4	MAN; 2; 6	MAN; 3; 4	7th	219

=== Complete FIA Formula 3 Championship results ===
(key) (Races in bold indicate pole position; races in italics indicate points for the fastest lap of top ten finishers)

Year	Entrant	1	2	3	4	5	6	7	8	9	10	11	12	13	14	15	16	17	18	19	20	21	DC	Points
2021	MP Motorsport	CAT; 1; 3	CAT; 2; 5	CAT; 3; 8	LEC; 1; 13	LEC; 2 Ret	LEC; 3; 3	RBR; 1; 17	RBR; 2; 17	RBR; 3; 7	HUN; 1; 20	HUN; 2; 12	HUN; 3; 16	SPA; 1; 9	SPA; 2; 4	SPA; 3; 4	ZAN; 1; 5	ZAN; 2; 4	ZAN; 3; 5	SOC; 1; 5	SOC; 2 C	SOC; 3 Ret	9th	93
2022	MP Motorsport	BHR; SPR; 7	BHR; FEA; Ret	IMO; SPR; 24†	IMO; FEA; 11	CAT; SPR; 3	CAT; FEA; 7	SIL; SPR; 11	SIL; FEA; 4	RBR; SPR; 2	RBR; FEA; 27	HUN; SPR; 1	HUN; FEA; 9	SPA; SPR; 10	**SPA**; **FEA**; 6	ZAN; SPR; 1	ZAN; FEA; 7	MNZ; SPR; 3	MNZ; FEA; 20				8th	88
2023	Van Amersfoort Racing	BHR; SPR; 3	BHR; FEA; 14	MEL; SPR; 21	MEL; FEA; 16	MON; SPR; 9	MON; FEA; Ret	CAT; SPR; 17	CAT; FEA; 12	RBR; SPR; 3	RBR; FEA; 3	SIL; SPR; 4	SIL; FEA; 15	HUN; SPR; 23	HUN; FEA; 19	SPA; SPR; 1	SPA; FEA; 5	MNZ; SPR; 19	MNZ; FEA; 4				9th	73

=== Complete Formula E results ===
(key) (Races in bold indicate pole position) (Races in italics indicate fastest lap)

Year	Team	Chassis	Powertrain	1	2	3	4	5	6	7	8	9	10	11	12	13	14	15	16	Pos	Points
2023–24	Nissan Formula E Team	Formula E Gen3	Nissan e-4ORCE 04	MEX	DRH	DRH	SAP	TOK	MIS	MIS	MCO	BER	BER	SHA	SHA	POR; 18	POR; 16	LDN	LDN	28th	0

=== American open–wheel racing results ===
==== Indy NXT ====
(key) (Races in bold indicate pole position) (Races in italics indicate fastest lap) (Races with ^{L} indicate a race lap led) (Races with * indicate most race laps led)

Year	Team	1	2	3	4	5	6	7	8	9	10	11	12	13	14	Rank	Points
2024	HMD Motorsports	STP; 7	BAR; 4	IMS; 19	IMS; 3^{L}*	DET; 2	ROA; 5	LAG; 2	LAG; 2	**MOH**; 1*	IOW; 18	GTW; 14	POR; 4	MIL; 8	NSH; 3	3rd	436
2025	HMD Motorsports	STP; 3	BAR; 19	IMS; 2	IMS; 5	DET; 2	GMP; 3^{L}*	RDA; 1^{L}	MOH; 2	IOW; 4	**LAG**; 1^{L}*	**LAG**; 1^{L}*	**POR**; 2	MIL; 7	NSH; 4	2nd	527

==== IndyCar Series ====
(key)

Year	Team	No.	Chassis	Engine	1	2	3	4	5	6	7	8	9	10	11	12	13	14	15	16	17	18	Rank	Points	Ref
2026	A. J. Foyt Enterprises	4	Dallara DW12	Chevrolet	STP; 17	PHX; 19	ARL; 12	ALA; 21	LBH; 22	IMS; 19	INDY; 26	DET; 16	GTW; 22	ROA; 16	MOH; 11	NSH; 25	POR; 20	MRK; 19	WSH; 9	MIL; 24	MIL; 23	LAG; 20	24th	203	

==== Indianapolis 500 ====
Year	Chassis	Engine	Start	Finish	Team
2026	Dallara	Chevrolet	32	26	A. J. Foyt Enterprises

=== Complete Stock Car Pro Series results ===
Year	Team	Car	1	2	3	4	5	6	7	8	9	10	11	12	13	14	15	16	17	18	19	20	21	22	23	Rank	Points
2026	TMG Racing	Chevrolet Tracker	CRS; 1	CRS; 2	CAS; 1	CAS; 2	INT; 1	INT; 2	GOI; 1	GOI; 2	CUI; 1	CUI; 2	VCA; 1	VCA; 2	SCZ; 1	SCZ; 2	CRS; 1	CRS; 2	BRA; 1 Ret	CAS; 1	CAS; 2	VEL; 1	VEL; 2	INT; 1	INT; 2	NC*	0*

^{*} Season still in progress.

Sporting positions
Preceded by Arthur Rougier	French F4 Championship; Champion; 2018	Succeeded by Hadrien David
