= 2021 Barcelona Formula 3 round =

Motor racing competition

(Spain) 2021 Barcelona Formula 3 round
Round details
- Round 1 of 7 in the 2021 FIA Formula 3 Championship.
- Location: Circuit de Barcelona-Catalunya, Montmeló, Catalonia, Spain
- Course: Permanent racing facility 4.675 km (2.905 mi)

Sprint race 1
- Date: 8 May 2021
- Laps: 21
Podium
First	(Russia) Aleksandr Smolyar	ART Grand Prix
Second	(France) Clément Novalak	Trident
Third	(Brazil) Caio Collet	MP Motorsport
Fastest lap
Driver	(Russia) Aleksandr Smolyar	ART Grand Prix
- Time: 1:36.665 (on lap 4)

Sprint race 2
- Date: 8 May 2021
- Laps: 22
Podium
First	(United Kingdom) Olli Caldwell	Prema Racing
Second	(France) Victor Martins	MP Motorsport
Third	(Denmark) Frederik Vesti	ART Grand Prix
Fastest lap
Driver	(Norway) Dennis Hauger	Prema Racing
- Time: 1:36.973 (on lap 10)

Feature race
- Date: 9 May 2021
- Laps: 22
Pole position
Driver	(Norway) Dennis Hauger	Prema Racing
Time	1:32.904	
Podium
First	(Norway) Dennis Hauger	Prema Racing
Second	(Australia) Jack Doohan	Trident
Third	(Italy) Matteo Nannini	HWA Racelab
Fastest lap
Driver	(Norway) Dennis Hauger	Prema Racing
- Time: 1:36.643 (on lap 2)

The 2021 Barcelona FIA Formula 3 round was a motor racing event held on 8 and 9 May 2021 at the Circuit de Barcelona-Catalunya in Montmeló, Catalonia, Spain. It was the first round of the 2021 FIA Formula 3 Championship, and ran in support of the 2021 Spanish Grand Prix.

== Classification ==
=== Qualifying ===
The Qualifying session took place on 7 May 2021, with Dennis Hauger scoring his first Formula 3 pole position, six thousandth ahead of fellow Red Bull junior Jack Doohan.

Pos.	No.	Driver	Team	Time/Gap	Grid
1	1	(Norway) Dennis Hauger	Prema Racing	1:32.904	1
2	4	(Australia) Jack Doohan	Trident	+0.006	2
3	17	(France) Victor Martins	MP Motorsport	+0.061	3
4	14	(Italy) Matteo Nannini	HWA Racelab	+0.209	4
5	7	(Denmark) Frederik Vesti	ART Grand Prix	+0.269	5
6	3	(United Kingdom) Olli Caldwell	Prema Racing	+0.280	6
7	5	(France) Clément Novalak	Trident	+0.321	7
8	29	(United States) Logan Sargeant	Charouz Racing System	+0.359	8
9	6	(Germany) David Schumacher	Trident	+0.370	9
10	18	(Brazil) Caio Collet	MP Motorsport	+0.401	10
11	8	(Russia) Aleksandr Smolyar	ART Grand Prix	+0.451	11
12	25	(United Kingdom) Jonny Edgar	Carlin Buzz Racing	+0.466	12
13	9	(United States) Juan Manuel Correa	ART Grand Prix	+0.555	13
14	12	(Czech Republic) Roman Staněk	Hitech Grand Prix	+0.618	14
15	2	(Monaco) Arthur Leclerc	Prema Racing	+0.631	15
16	15	(Denmark) Oliver Rasmussen	HWA Racelab	+0.733	16
17	16	(Mexico) Rafael Villagómez	HWA Racelab	+0.771	17
18	30	(Brazil) Enzo Fittipaldi	Charouz Racing System	+0.902	18
19	11	(Japan) Ayumu Iwasa	Hitech Grand Prix	+0.961	19
20	10	(United States) Jak Crawford	Hitech Grand Prix	+0.972	20
21	26	(Australia) Calan Williams	Jenzer Motorsport	+0.977	21
22	19	(Netherlands) Tijmen van der Helm	MP Motorsport	+1.004	22
23	24	(United States) Kaylen Frederick	Carlin Buzz Racing	+1.057	23
24	21	(Italy) Lorenzo Colombo	Campos Racing	+1.120	24
25	22	(Belgium) Amaury Cordeel	Campos Racing	+1.287	25
26	23	(Israel) Ido Cohen	Carlin Buzz Racing	+1.429	26
27	20	(Hungary) László Tóth	Campos Racing	+1.566	27
28	31	(France) Reshad de Gerus	Charouz Racing System	+1.871	28
29	27	(France) Pierre-Louis Chovet	Jenzer Motorsport	+1.874	29
30	28	(Romania) Filip Ugran	Jenzer Motorsport	+2.228	30

=== Sprint Race 1 ===
On the formation lap the Carlin of Ido Cohen stopped, leading to the start being aborted and one race lap being removed. Cohen was able to start from the pitlane.

Edgar had a good start as Smolyar immediately came under pressure from Caio Collet. The Russian managed to shake off the MP Motorsport driver, who was then drawn into a battle with Novalak and Logan Sargeant, and closed the gap to Edgar.

As soon as DRS was enabled, Smolyar was on the attack, sweeping past the Carlin driver to take the race lead on lap 4. Edgar tried to fight back a lap later but he couldn't get back through. Smolyar managed to break the tow to Edgar and extended a gap at the front of the field.

Edgar was soon joined by Collet, who tried to challenge Edgar for second, but allowed Trident driver Novalak to sweep through to take third after running wide.

Novalak soon snatched second from Edgar around the outside of the first corner and was closing the gap to Smolyar when the safety car was brought out with two laps remaining, after Oliver Rasmussen clipped the curb and ran into the gravel at the final corner, where he got stuck. Rasmussen's car couldn't be cleared in time for a restart and the race ended behind the safety car, allowing Smolyar to take his maiden F3 win. Collet held off Sargeant to take third, and Edgar dropped back to fifth. The battling Caldwell, Vesti and Hauger finished behind, and Martins and Nannini completed the top ten.

Pos.	No.	Driver	Team	Laps	Time/Gap	Grid	Pts.
1	8	(Russia) Aleksandr Smolyar	ART Grand Prix	21	36:23.523	2	15 (2)
2	5	(France) Clément Novalak	Trident	21	+1.591	6	12
3	18	(Brazil) Caio Collet	MP Motorsport	21	+1.951	3	10
4	29	(United States) Logan Sargeant	Charouz Racing System	21	+2.130	5	8
5	25	(United Kingdom) Jonny Edgar	Carlin Buzz Racing	21	+2.494	1	6
6	3	(United Kingdom) Olli Caldwell	Prema Racing	21	+2.857	7	5
7	7	(Denmark) Frederik Vesti	ART Grand Prix	21	+3.481	8	4
8	1	(Norway) Dennis Hauger	Prema Racing	21	+3.819	12	3
9	17	(France) Victor Martins	MP Motorsport	21	+4.120	10	2
10	14	(Italy) Matteo Nannini	HWA Racelab	21	+4.543	9	1
11	6	(Germany) David Schumacher	Trident	21	+4.973	4	
12	30	(Brazil) Enzo Fittipaldi	Charouz Racing System	21	+5.320	18	
13	10	(United States) Jak Crawford	Hitech Grand Prix	21	+5.716	20	
14	11	(Japan) Ayumu Iwasa	Hitech Grand Prix	21	+6.232	19	
15	9	(United States) Juan Manuel Correa	ART Grand Prix	21	+7.210	13	
16	12	(Czech Republic) Roman Staněk	Hitech Grand Prix	21	+7.754	14	
17	4	(Australia) Jack Doohan	Trident	21	+10.095	11	
18	26	(Australia) Calan Williams	Jenzer Motorsport	21	+10.349	21	
19	16	(Mexico) Rafael Villagómez	HWA Racelab	21	+11.270	17	
20	31	(France) Reshad de Gerus	Charouz Racing System	21	+11.864	28	
21	19	(Netherlands) Tijmen van der Helm	MP Motorsport	21	+13.444	22	
22	24	(United States) Kaylen Frederick	Carlin Buzz Racing	21	+13.925	23	
23	21	(Italy) Lorenzo Colombo	Campos Racing	21	+14.171	24	
24	27	(France) Pierre-Louis Chovet	Jenzer Motorsport	21	+18.083	29	
25	28	(Romania) Filip Ugran	Jenzer Motorsport	21	+18.384	30	
26	22	(Belgium) Amaury Cordeel	Campos Racing	21	+20.506	25	
27	20	(Hungary) László Tóth	Campos Racing	21	+21.031	27	
28	2	(Monaco) Arthur Leclerc	Prema Racing	21	+21.452	15	
29	23	(Israel) Ido Cohen	Carlin Buzz Racing	21	+38.072	26	
DNF	15	(Denmark) Oliver Rasmussen	HWA Racelab	18	Accident	16	

=== Sprint Race 2 ===
Fittipaldi led from reversed-grid pole position at the start, as the Safety Car was brought out after Smolyar had sustained a puncture in Turn 1 after contact with Novalak, which sent the Russian into the path of Sargeant. After the restart David Schumacher was able to keep up with the Brazilian, and passed him on lap 12.

Schumacher couldn't pull away however and was forced to defend three laps later, when Fittipaldi got fully alongside. Trying to go around the outside of Turn 1, Fittipaldi went wide off track and then tried to rejoin over the raised kerb at Turn 2, banging wheels with Schumacher and sending the latter crashing into the barriers. Fittipaldi continued in third behind Matteo Nannini and Dennis Hauger, only to then slow to a halt under the subsequent safety car period.

When the race restarted with five laps to go, Hauger immediately went side by side with Nannini for the lead, but the HWA driver braked late on the inside to stay out front. Going onto the penultimate lap they were then side-by-side once more, Hauger this time taking to the inside. After mounting the apex kerb he had an oversteer which led to him hitting Nannini, and was left with nowhere to go but run into his spinning rival. This led to Caldwell picking up the lead, and going into the first corner on the last lap he was forced to defend against a charging Victor Martins, leaving the Frenchman no room to go around the outside. The Prema driver won the race and picked up 15 points, ahead of Martins and a quiet Frederik Vesti. Novalak, Collet, Edgar, Iwasa, Doohan, Crawford and Juan Manuel Correa completed the top ten, with the latter scoring the first point of his racing return.

Pos.	No.	Driver	Team	Laps	Time/Gap	Grid	Pts.
1	3	(United Kingdom) Olli Caldwell	Prema Racing	22	40:42.623	7	15
2	17	(France) Victor Martins	MP Motorsport	22	+0.905	4	12
3	7	(Denmark) Frederik Vesti	ART Grand Prix	22	+2.858	6	10
4	5	(France) Clément Novalak	Trident	22	+3.742	11	8
5	18	(Brazil) Caio Collet	MP Motorsport	22	+3.979	10	6
6	25	(United Kingdom) Jonny Edgar	Carlin Buzz Racing	22	+4.522	8	5
7	11	(Japan) Ayumu Iwasa	Hitech Grand Prix	22	+5.008	14	4
8	4	(Australia) Jack Doohan	Trident	22	+5.511	17	3
9	10	(United States) Jak Crawford	Hitech Grand Prix	22	+5.868	13	2
10	9	(United States) Juan Manuel Correa	ART Grand Prix	22	+6.467	15	1
11	26	(Australia) Calan Williams	Jenzer Motorsport	22	+6.757	18	
12	12	(Czech Republic) Roman Staněk	Hitech Grand Prix	22	+9.862	16	
13	31	(France) Reshad de Gerus	Charouz Racing System	22	+10.328	20	
14	27	(France) Pierre-Louis Chovet	Jenzer Motorsport	22	+10.919	24	
15	19	(Netherlands) Tijmen van der Helm	MP Motorsport	22	+11.482	21	
16	22	(Belgium) Amaury Cordeel	Campos Racing	22	+11.979	26	
17	24	(United States) Kaylen Frederick	Carlin Buzz Racing	22	+14.113	22	
18	16	(Mexico) Rafael Villagómez	HWA Racelab	22	+15.168	19	
19	15	(Denmark) Oliver Rasmussen	HWA Racelab	22	+15.608	30	
20	23	(Israel) Ido Cohen	Carlin Buzz Racing	22	+16.047	29	
21	28	(Romania) Filip Ugran	Jenzer Motorsport	22	+16.408	25	
22	21	(Italy) Lorenzo Colombo	Campos Racing	22	+16.901	23	
23	20	(Hungary) László Tóth	Campos Racing	22	+18.305	27	
24	2	(Monaco) Arthur Leclerc	Prema Racing	22	+18.552^{1}	28	
25	1	(Norway) Dennis Hauger	Prema Racing	22	+1:37.491^{2}	5	
26	14	(Italy) Matteo Nannini	HWA Racelab	21	Collision	3	
DNF	30	(Brazil) Enzo Fittipaldi	Charouz Racing System	15	Electrical	1	
DNF	6	(Germany) David Schumacher	Trident	14	Collision	2	
DNF	29	(United States) Logan Sargeant	Charouz Racing System	0	Collision	9	
DNF	8	(Russia) Aleksandr Smolyar	ART Grand Prix	0	Collision	12	

Notes

- ^1 – Arthur Leclerc was given a 10-second time penalty for violation of minimum delta time under Safety Car
- ^2 – Dennis Hauger was given a 10-second time penalty for causing a collision with Matteo Nannini

=== Feature Race ===
At the start, Hauger didn't have a great launch but as he went four-wide down the long main pit straight with Doohan, Martins and Nannini, he braked last and got ahead of the others, in which Doohan lost out and fell back to fourth.

As Hauger gradually extended the gap at the front, Doohan regained momentum and passed Martins on lap nine, who had run over the sausage kerb at the exit of turn 15, and was then passed by Nannini.

Doohan then overtook Nannini for second after three further laps, as Hauger was able to pull a gap on the rest of the field. Four laps from the end, Caldwell overtook Martins for fourth, and as the gaps remained stagnant for the remainder of the race, Hauger won in dominant fashion. Doohan scored his first F3 podium, with Nannini in third. The three were followed up by Caldwell, Martins, Novalak, Vesti, Collet, Sargeant, who lost two positions on lap 21 after running wide at the final corner, and Staněk, who came home in tenth.

Pos.	No.	Driver	Team	Laps	Time/Gap	Grid	Pts.
1	1	(Norway) Dennis Hauger	Prema Racing	22	35:47.216	1	25 (4+2)
2	4	(Australia) Jack Doohan	Trident	22	+3.721	2	18
3	14	(Italy) Matteo Nannini	HWA Racelab	22	+6.153	4	15
4	3	(United Kingdom) Olli Caldwell	Prema Racing	22	+8.124	6	12
5	17	(France) Victor Martins	MP Motorsport	22	+11.548	3	10
6	5	(France) Clément Novalak	Trident	22	+12.337	7	8
7	7	(Denmark) Frederik Vesti	ART Grand Prix	22	+13.455	5	6
8	18	(Brazil) Caio Collet	MP Motorsport	22	+14.053	10	4
9	29	(United States) Logan Sargeant	Charouz Racing System	22	+15.435	8	2
10	12	(Czech Republic) Roman Staněk	Hitech Grand Prix	22	+15.477	14	1
11	8	(Russia) Aleksandr Smolyar	ART Grand Prix	22	+16.062	11	
12	6	(Germany) David Schumacher	Trident	22	+16.688	9	
13	2	(Monaco) Arthur Leclerc	Prema Racing	22	+17.238	15	
14	9	(United States) Juan Manuel Correa	ART Grand Prix	22	+21.249	13	
15	11	(Japan) Ayumu Iwasa	Hitech Grand Prix	22	+26.143	19	
16	25	(United Kingdom) Jonny Edgar	Carlin Buzz Racing	22	+31.767	12	
17	15	(Denmark) Oliver Rasmussen	HWA Racelab	22	+32.388	16	
18	10	(United States) Jak Crawford	Hitech Grand Prix	22	+32.628	20	
19	30	(Brazil) Enzo Fittipaldi	Charouz Racing System	22	+33.274	18	
20	19	(Netherlands) Tijmen van der Helm	MP Motorsport	22	+33.882	22	
21	26	(Australia) Calan Williams	Jenzer Motorsport	22	+34.069	21	
22	23	(Israel) Ido Cohen	Carlin Buzz Racing	22	+37.210	26	
23	31	(France) Reshad de Gerus	Charouz Racing System	22	+37.932	28	
24	27	(France) Pierre-Louis Chovet	Jenzer Motorsport	22	+38.577	29	
25	22	(Belgium) Amaury Cordeel	Campos Racing	22	+39.222	25	
26	20	(Hungary) László Tóth	Campos Racing	22	+40.548	27	
27	28	(Romania) Filip Ugran	Jenzer Motorsport	22	+53.678	30	
28	16	(Mexico) Rafael Villagómez	HWA Racelab	21	+1 Lap^{1}	17	
29	21	(Italy) Lorenzo Colombo	Campos Racing	21	+1 Lap	24	
30	24	(United States) Kaylen Frederick	Carlin Buzz Racing	21	+1 Lap	23	

Notes

- ^1 – Rafael Villagómez received a five-second time penalty for forcing Amaury Cordeel off the track in the first two corners.

== Standings after the event ==
Drivers' Championship standings

Pos.	Driver	Points
1	(Norway) Dennis Hauger	34
2	(United Kingdom) Olli Caldwell	32
3	(France) Clément Novalak	28
4	(France) Victor Martins	24
5	(Australia) Jack Doohan	21

Teams' Championship standings

Pos.	Team	Points
1	(Italy) Prema Racing	66
2	(Italy) Trident	49
3	(Netherlands) MP Motorsport	44
4	(France) ART Grand Prix	38
5	(Germany) HWA Racelab	16

- Note: Only the top five positions are included for both sets of standings.

== See also ==
- 2021 Spanish Grand Prix

Previous round: 2020 Mugello Formula 3 round	FIA Formula 3 Championship; 2021 season	Next round: 2021 Le Castellet Formula 3 round
Previous round: 2020 Barcelona Formula 3 round	Barcelona Formula 3 round	Next round: 2022 Barcelona Formula 3 round
