= 2018 French F4 Championship =

French motorsport season

The 2018 French F4 Championship was the eighth season to run under the guise of the French F4 Championship and the first season under the FIA Formula 4 regulations. The championship used Mygale M14-F4 chassis like in the F4 British Championship and Australian Formula 4 Championship. The engine was upgraded from 1.6 litre to 2.0 litre. The series began on 1 April at Nogaro and ended on 14 October at Le Castellet, after seven rounds and twenty one races.

== Driver lineup ==
No.	Driver	Class	Rounds
1	(France) Baptiste Berthelot		All
2	(France) Romain Boeckler	G	1, 3, 5, 7
3	(South Africa) Stuart White		1–3
4	(Belgium) Baptiste Moulin		All
5	(France) Adam Eteki		All
6	(France) Gillian Henrion	G	7
7	(Monaco) Arthur Leclerc		All
8	(France) Evan Spenle	G	7
9	(United Arab Emirates) Lucas Petersson	G	4
10	(France) Reshad de Gerus	J	All
11	(France) Pierre-Louis Chovet		1–4, 6–7
16	(France) Sacha Lehmann		All
18	(France) Mateo Herrero		All
21	(France) Théo Pourchaire	J	All
22	(France) Théo Nouet		All
23	(Brazil) Caio Collet		All
27	(Belgium) Ugo de Wilde		All
28	(France) Alessandro Ghiretti	G	6–7
30	(Belgium) Esteban Muth		All
31	(Belgium) Ulysse de Pauw		All
51	(Oman) Shihab Al Habsi	J	All
87	(Germany) O'Neill Muth	J	1–6
97	(French Guiana) Gavin Aimable		1–2

Icon	Status
J	Drivers that compete for the Junior Championship
G	Guest drivers ineligible for Drivers' Championship

- Noah Watt was scheduled to compete in the championship, but did not appear in any rounds.

== Race calendar ==
A seven round calendar was published in the FFSA Academy website, confirming the return of Dijon-Prenois and moving the Circuit de Barcelona-Catalunya round in Spain to Jerez.

Round		Circuit	Date	Pole position	Fastest lap	Winning driver	Junior Winner
1	R1	(France) Circuit Paul Armagnac, Nogaro	1 April	(Belgium) Ugo de Wilde	(France) Adam Eteki	(Belgium) Ugo de Wilde	(France) Théo Pourchaire
1	R2	(France) Circuit Paul Armagnac, Nogaro	1 April		(France) Théo Pourchaire	(Monaco) Arthur Leclerc	(France) Théo Pourchaire
1	R3	(France) Circuit Paul Armagnac, Nogaro	2 April	(France) Adam Eteki	(Brazil) Caio Collet	(France) Adam Eteki	(France) Théo Pourchaire
2	R1	(France) Circuit de Pau, Pau	12 May	(Brazil) Caio Collet	(Monaco) Arthur Leclerc	(Brazil) Caio Collet	(France) Théo Pourchaire
2	R2	(France) Circuit de Pau, Pau	12 May		(France) Adam Eteki	(France) Adam Eteki	(France) Reshad de Gerus
2	R3	(France) Circuit de Pau, Pau	13 May	(Brazil) Caio Collet	(Belgium) Ugo de Wilde	(Brazil) Caio Collet	(France) Théo Pourchaire
3	R1	(Belgium) Circuit de Spa-Francorchamps, Spa	2 June	(Monaco) Arthur Leclerc	(France) Théo Pourchaire	(Belgium) Ulysse de Pauw	(France) Théo Pourchaire
3	R2	(Belgium) Circuit de Spa-Francorchamps, Spa	2 June		(South Africa) Stuart White	(France) Théo Pourchaire	(France) Théo Pourchaire
3	R3	(Belgium) Circuit de Spa-Francorchamps, Spa	3 June	(Brazil) Caio Collet	(South Africa) Stuart White	(South Africa) Stuart White	(France) Théo Pourchaire
4	R1	(France) Dijon-Prenois, Dijon	14 July	(Belgium) Ugo de Wilde	(Brazil) Caio Collet	(Belgium) Ugo de Wilde	(France) Théo Pourchaire
4	R2	(France) Dijon-Prenois, Dijon	15 July		(Belgium) Ulysse de Pauw	(France) Théo Nouet	(France) Théo Pourchaire
4	R3	(France) Dijon-Prenois, Dijon	15 July	(France) Adam Eteki	(Belgium) Esteban Muth	(Brazil) Caio Collet	(France) Théo Pourchaire
5	R1	(France) Circuit de Nevers Magny-Cours, Magny-Cours	8 September	(Brazil) Caio Collet	(Brazil) Caio Collet	(Brazil) Caio Collet	(France) Théo Pourchaire
5	R2	(France) Circuit de Nevers Magny-Cours, Magny-Cours	8 September		(Brazil) Caio Collet	(Monaco) Arthur Leclerc	(France) Reshad de Gerus
5	R3	(France) Circuit de Nevers Magny-Cours, Magny-Cours	9 September	(Brazil) Caio Collet	(Brazil) Caio Collet	(Brazil) Caio Collet	(France) Théo Pourchaire
6	R1	(Spain) Circuito de Jerez, Jerez	6 October	(Brazil) Caio Collet	(Brazil) Caio Collet	(Brazil) Caio Collet	(France) Théo Pourchaire
6	R2	(Spain) Circuito de Jerez, Jerez	7 October		(Germany) Esteban Muth	(Germany) O'Neill Muth	(Germany) O'Neill Muth
6	R3	(Spain) Circuito de Jerez, Jerez	7 October	(Brazil) Caio Collet	(Brazil) Caio Collet	(Brazil) Caio Collet	(France) Reshad de Gerus
7	R1	(France) Circuit Paul Ricard, Le Castellet	13 October	(Belgium) Ugo de Wilde	(France) Adam Eteki	(Belgium) Ugo de Wilde	(France) Théo Pourchaire
7	R2	(France) Circuit Paul Ricard, Le Castellet	14 October		(France) Adam Eteki	(France) Pierre-Louis Chovet	(France) Reshad de Gerus
7	R3	(France) Circuit Paul Ricard, Le Castellet	14 October	(Belgium) Ugo de Wilde	(France) Pierre-Louis Chovet	(Belgium) Ugo de Wilde	(France) Théo Pourchaire

== Championship standings ==
Points system

Points were awarded as follows:

Races	Position										Bonus	
Races	1st	2nd	3rd	4th	5th	6th	7th	8th	9th	10th	PP	FL
Races 1 & 3	25	18	15	12	10	8	6	4	2	1	**1**	1
Race 2	15	12	10	8	6	4	2	1	0	0	–	1

=== Drivers standings – FFSA Academy ===
Pos	Driver	NOG (France)			PAU (Note: Half points awarded for Race 3 as the race was halted before 75% distance due to heavy rain.) (France)			SPA (Belgium)			DIJ (France)			MAG (France)			JER (Spain)			LEC (France)			Pts
1	(Brazil) Caio Collet	3	3	4	**1**	8	**1**	Ret	5	**2**	5	4	1	**1**	4	**1**	**1**	6	**1**	4	4	6	296.5
2	(Belgium) Ugo de Wilde	**1**	7	2	3	6	2	8	Ret	7	**1**	9	5	Ret	5	7	8	4	7	**1**	6	**1**	210.5
3	(France) Théo Pourchaire	4	2	3	7	4	6	5	1	4	4	6	8	2	Ret	2	4	8	10	2	10	3	203
4	(France) Adam Eteki	2	8	**1**	9	1	7	6	Ret	8	2	7	**2**	3	8	4	17†	DNS	11	3	3	2	192
5	(Belgium) Ulysse de Pauw	5	6	6	8	3	9	1	3	6	6	5	3	6	3	8	6	5	6	5	7	5	180
6	(Monaco) Arthur Leclerc	7	1	5	2	9	14	**3**	6	5	7	2	6	4	1	3	2	7	8	18	11	12	175
7	(France) Pierre-Louis Chovet	6	5	Ret	5	7	4	2	8	3	3	8	7				9	3	5	10	1	8	135
8	(Belgium) Esteban Muth	9	Ret	13	4	15	3	9	2	9	8	3	16	5	12†	10	7	2	3	6	8	10	113.5
9	(France) Reshad de Gerus	13	11	9	10	2	8	11	Ret	12	13	12	15	8	2	5	5	10	4	7	5	7	88
10	(South Africa) Stuart White	11	Ret	7	6	5	5	4	4	1													72
11	(France) Théo Nouet	19†	10	10	11	Ret	10	7	14	10	9	1	4	Ret	10	9	11	11	16†	9	2	4	66.5
12	(Germany) O'Neill Muth	10	4	12	13	11	Ret	13	9	11	12	13	9	7	9	6	10	1	9				46
13	(France) Matéo Herrero	8	Ret	8	12	10	11	10	7	13	11	10	11	10	6	14	14	DNS	DNS	8	17	DNS	20
14	(France) Sacha Lehmann	14	16	Ret	17	14	15	15	10	15	15	14	14	9	7	11	13	14	12	Ret	14	18	4
15	(Oman) Shihab Al Habsi	12	9	11	14	12	12	12	13	17	10	11	10	13	Ret	12	15	15	15	16	18	14	2
16	(France) Baptiste Berthelot	18	15	17	18	17†	16	16	15	Ret	17	16	17	14	11	Ret	16	13	14	15	19	17	0
17	(Belgium) Baptiste Moulin	16	14	15	16	16	13	17	12	16	16	15	12	12	Ret	13	12	12	13	12	15	13	0
18	(French Guiana) Gavin Aimable	15	12	14	15	13	Ret																0
Guest drivers ineligible to score points
–	(France) Alessandro Ghiretti																3	9	2	13	9	16	–
–	(France) Gillian Henrion																			11	12	9	–
–	(France) Romain Boeckler	17	13	16				14	11	14				11	Ret	Ret				14	16	11	–
–	(United Arab Emirates) Lucas Petersson										14	Ret	13										–
–	(France) Evan Spenle																			17	13	15	–
Pos	Driver	NOG (France)			PAU (France)			SPA (Belgium)			DIJ (France)			MAG (France)			JER (Spain)			LEC (France)			Pts

Colour	Result
Gold	Winner
Silver	Second place
Bronze	Third place
Green	Points classification
Blue	Non-points classification
Blue	Non-classified finish (NC)
Purple	Retired, not classified (Ret)
Red	Did not qualify (DNQ)
Red	Did not pre-qualify (DNPQ)
Black	Disqualified (DSQ)
White	Did not start (DNS)
White	Withdrew (WD)
White	Race cancelled (C)
Blank	Did not practice (DNP)
Blank	Did not arrive (DNA)
Blank	Excluded (EX)

**Bold** – Pole
Italics – Fastest Lap
† — Did not finish, but classified

=== Drivers standings – FIA Formula 4 ===
Pos	Driver	NOG (France)			PAU (France)			SPA (Belgium)			DIJ (France)			MAG (France)			JER (Spain)			LEC (France)			Pts
1	(Brazil) Caio Collet	3	2	3	1	6	1	Ret	4	2	4	4	1	1	3	1	1	5	1	3	4	5	303.5
2	(Belgium) Ugo de Wilde	1	5	2	3	4	2	7	Ret	6	1	8	5	Ret	4	4	5	3	5	1	5	1	237
3	(Belgium) Ulysse de Pauw	4	4	5	7	2	7	1	2	5	5	5	3	5	2	5	3	4	4	4	6	4	224
4	(France) Adam Eteki	2	6	1	8	1	6	5	Ret	7	2	6	2	2	7	3	12†	DNS	7	2	3	2	213
5	(Monaco) Arthur Leclerc	6	1	4	2	7	11	3	5	4	6	2	6	3	1	2	2	6	6	11	8	8	199
6	(France) Pierre-Louis Chovet	5	3	Ret	5	5	4	2	7	3	3	7	7				6	2	3	8	1	6	162
7	(Belgium) Esteban Muth	8	Ret	9	4	11	3	8	1	8	7	3	11	4	10†	7	4	1	2	5	7	7	145.5
8	(France) Théo Nouet	14†	7	8	9	Ret	8	6	10	9	8	1	4	Ret	8	6	7	7	11†	7	2	3	101
9	(South Africa) Stuart White	9	Ret	6	6	3	5	4	3	1													80
10	(France) Matéo Herrero	7	Ret	7	10	8	9	9	6	10	9	9	8	7	5	10	10	DNS	DNS	6	11	DNS	50
11	(France) Sacha Lehmann	10	11	Ret	13	10	12	10	8	11	10	10	10	6	6	8	9	10	8	Ret	9	11	27
12	(Belgium) Baptiste Moulin	12	9	11	12	12	10	12	9	12	11	11	9	8	Ret	9	8	8	9	9	10	9	19.5
13	(France) Baptiste Berthelot	13	10	12	14	13†	13	11	11	Ret	12	12	12	9	9	Ret	11	9	10	10	12	10	5
14	(French Guiana) Gavin Aimable	11	8	10	11	9	Ret																2
Pos	Driver	NOG (France)			PAU (France)			SPA (Belgium)			DIJ (France)			MAG (France)			JER (Spain)			LEC (France)			Pts

=== Juniors' standings ===
Pos	Driver	NOG (France)			PAU (France)			SPA (Belgium)			DIJ (France)			MAG (France)			JER (Spain)			LEC (France)			Pts
1	(France) Théo Pourchaire	1	1	1	1	2	1	1	1	1	1	1	1	1	Ret	1	1	2	3	1	2	1	408.5
2	(France) Reshad de Gerus	4	4	2	2	1	2	2	Ret	3	4	3	4	3	1	2	2	3	1	2	1	2	299
3	(Oman) Shihab Al Habsi	2	2	4	4	4	3	3	3	4	2	2	3	4	Ret	4	4	4	4	3	3	3	245.5
4	(Germany) O'Neill Muth	3	3	3	3	3	Ret	4	2	2	3	4	2	2	2	3	3	1	2				243
