= Pierre-Louis Chovet =

French racing driver (born 2002)

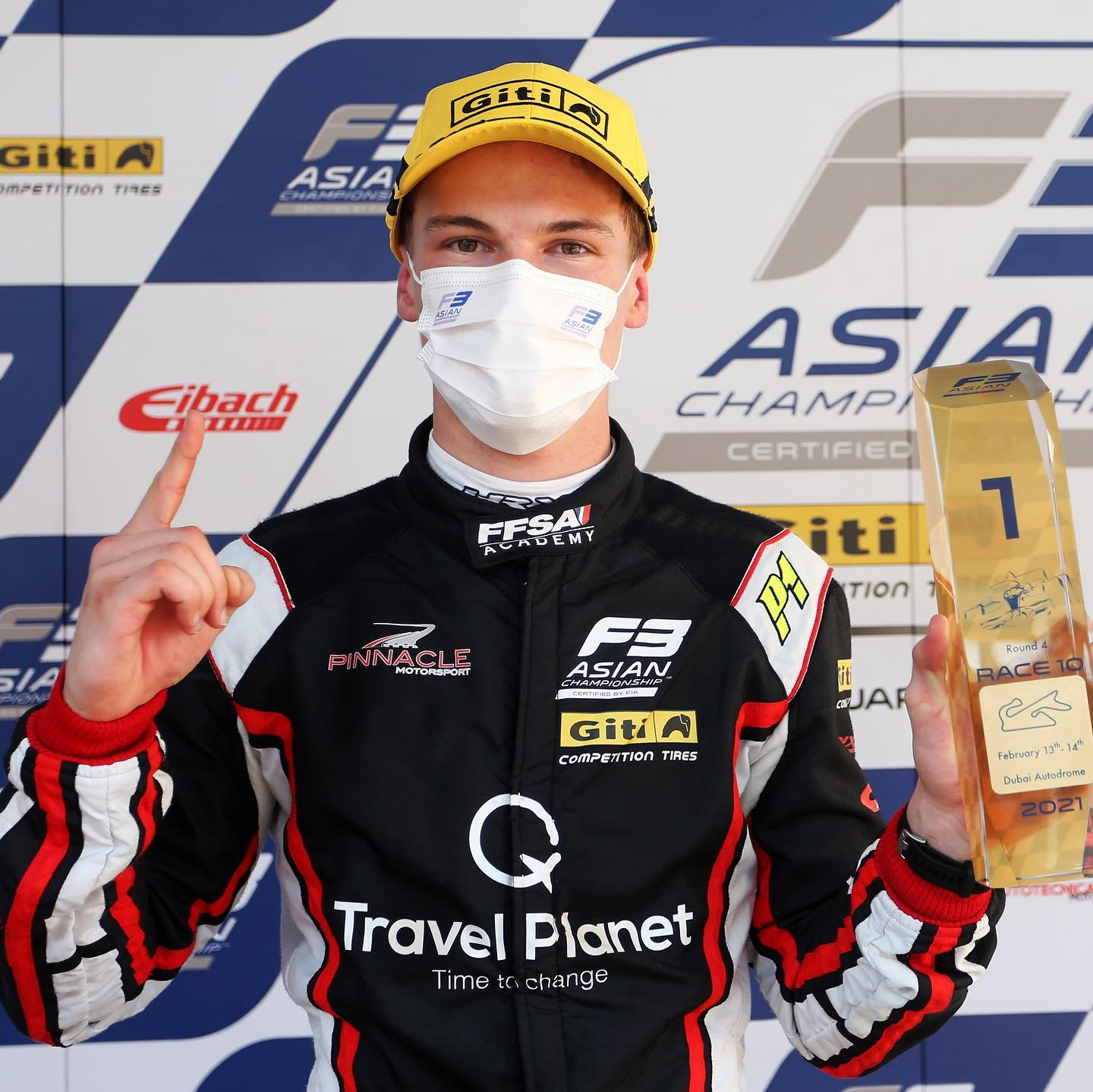
- Chovet in the 2021 F3 Asian Championship
- Nationality: (France) French
- Born: 11 April 2002 (age 24) Avignon, France

FR European Championship career
- Debut season: 2020
- Current team: RPM
- Categorisation: FIA Silver
- Car number: 55
- Former teams: Van Amersfoort Racing
- Starts: 29 (30 entries)
- Wins: 1
- Podiums: 9
- Poles: 1
- Fastest laps: 3
- Best finish: 5th in 2020

FIA Formula 3 Championship career
- Debut season: 2020
- Current team: Campos Racing
- Car number: 27
- Former teams: Hitech Grand Prix, Jenzer Motorsport
- Starts: 10
- Wins: 0
- Podiums: 0
- Poles: 0
- Fastest laps: 0
- Best finish: 19th in 2020

Previous series
- 2019 2017-18: Euroformula Open Championship; French F4 Championship

Pierre-Louis Chovet (born 11 April 2002) is a French racing driver.

== Junior racing career ==
=== Karting ===
Chovet practiced many sports during his childhood such as skiing, BMX or tennis. He attended the 2011 Monaco Grand Prix and quickly developed a passion for motorsports. He quickly discovered karting, by participating in PACA-Corsica regional championships, where he won the Cadet title in 2015.

The following year, Chovet finished second in the French Cup in Cadets. Even though he got supported by Stéphane Ortelli, a family friend, he sometimes missed several races and practice sessions because of his limited budget preventing him from training frequently and benefiting from the most efficient engines.

Advised by Soheil Ayari, Chovet entered the French Junior Karting Championship, organized by the FFSA, where all drivers compete on equal terms. He was crowned French Junior Champion ahead of Sami Meguetounif, Victor Bernier and Isack Hadjar.

=== 2017–2018: Lower formulae ===
==== 2017 ====
Chovet first appeared in single seaters as a guest driver at the tail end of the 2017 French F4 Championship at the age of 15. In his debut race at Magny-Cours, Chovet finished 15th however the following race he failed to take his drive through penalty leading to a disqualification from the race and subsequently being excluded from the third and final race. Chovet finished the season two eighth-place finishes and a win at Circuit Paul Ricard by beating pole-sitter Jean-Baptiste Mela by 1 1/2 seconds. Due to him being a guest driver, he was unable to score any points.

==== 2018 ====
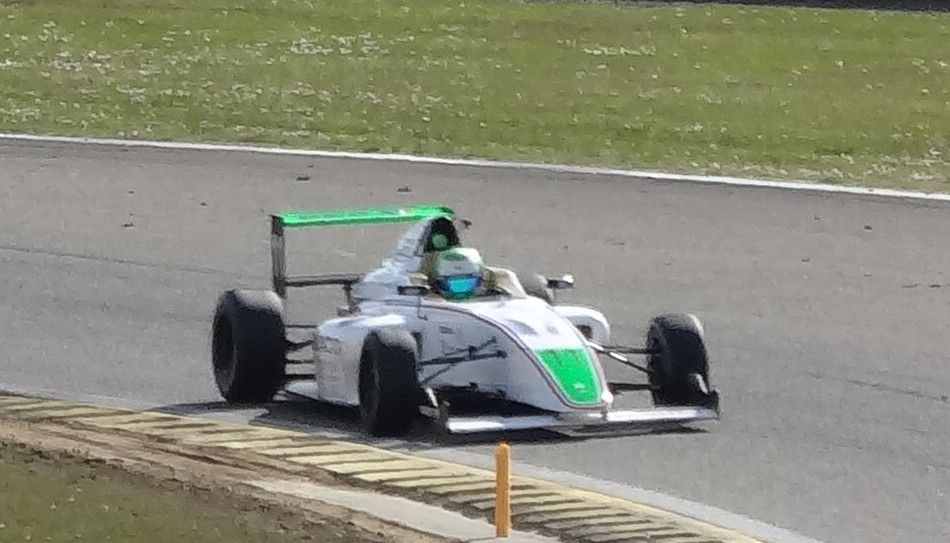
Chovet racing in the 2018 French F4 Championship

In 2018, Chovet returned for a full-time race seat in the Mygale M14 car. Chovet stood on the podium for the first time that season in only the second race at Circuit Paul Armagnac behind Caio Collet and Arthur Leclerc, he retired from the next race however; this was the first and only time Chovet wouldn't finish in the points that season. A handful of podiums including a second place at Spa-Francorchamps saw Chovet sit in sixth place in the championship with 100 points before missing round 6 at Magny-Cours, he returned for the next race in Jerez, where he grabbed second place for the second time that season. Chovet took his first victory of the season at the penultimate race of the season, finishing ahead of compatriots Théo Nouet and Adam Eteki.

=== 2019: Euroformula Open ===
Chovet only raced seven times in 2019 and it was for RP Motorsport in the Euroformula Open Championship. In the first race he finished 36 seconds behind race winner Liam Lawson in 14th place, in the following race he retired and Javier Gonzalez, his teammate, was unable to take the start caused by a mechanical issue. The pair took a break due to complaints about their Toyota engines and returned for the fourth rounds at Circuit de Spa-Francorchamps with new Spiess-powered cars, this was where Chovet took his only points finish of the season in ninth place climbing the field from 17th. He finished the season in 23rd with two points.

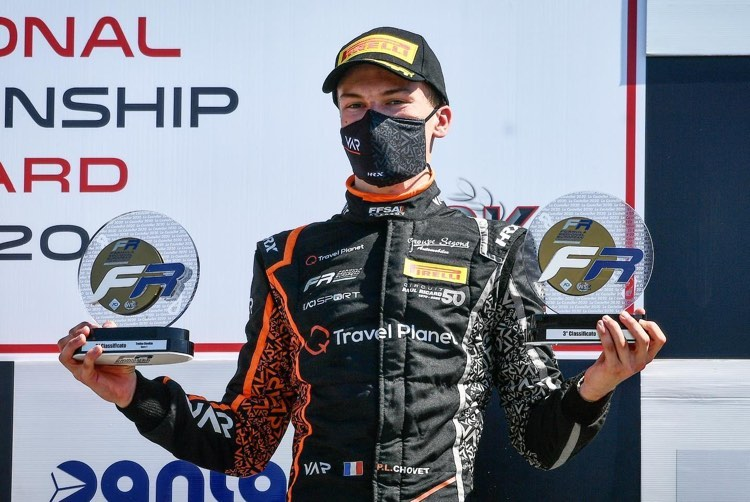
Chovet after scoring a podium at Le Castellet in 2020

=== 2020: Formula Regional European Championship and Formula 3 debut ===
In 2020, Chovet raced for Van Amersfoort Racing in the Formula Regional European Championship. He won a race at Catalunya and finished fifth in the standings, second-best of the non-Prema drivers behind Patrik Pasma.

It was announced that Max Fewtrell would be leaving Hitech Grand Prix prior to the seventh round of the 2020 FIA Formula 3 Championship. The next day, on 25 August 2020, it was announced that Chovet would replace Fewtrell for the Spa-Francorchamps round. He scored a sixth-place finish in only his fourth race at Monza.

=== 2021: Part-time Formula 3 campaign ===
In 2021, Chovet was announced to drive for Jenzer Motorsport full-time in the FIA Formula 3 Championship, partnering Calan Williams and Filip Urgan. In an interview before the start of the season Chovet responded to questions why he chose Jenzer with the fact that he wanted to work in an "environment that made [him] feel at home". However, after the first round of the season, Chovet announced that his main sponsor had pulled funding, leading to his replacement at Jenzer by Johnathan Hoggard. On his replacement, Chovet stated that he was "disgusted". When László Tóth was tested positive for COVID-19, Chovet was able to replace the Hungarian at Campos Racing for the weekend at Le Castellet.

=== 2022 ===
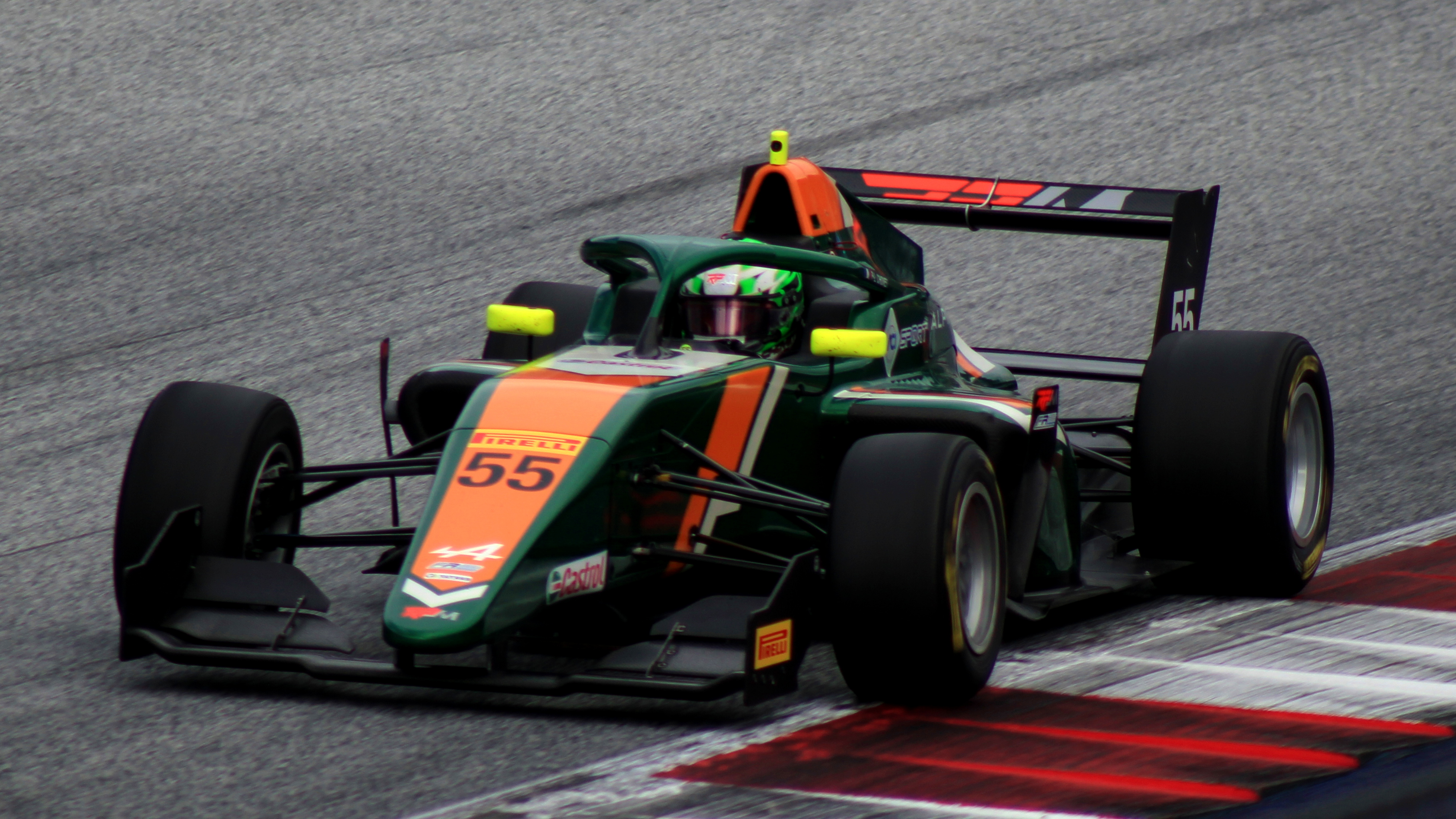
Chovet racing in the 2022 Formula Regional European Championship at the Red Bull Ring.

Chovet returned to the 2022 Formula Regional European Championship with Race Performance Motorsport, replacing Pietro Delli Guanti.

=== 2023 ===
Chovet joined Drivex School for the 2023 Eurocup-3 season, participating in the opening round at Spa-Francorchamps.

Chovet returned to the Formula Regional European Championship in October with Saintéloc Racing.

=== 2024 ===
Chovet returned to Eurocup-3 in 2024, participating in a one-off round at MotorLand Aragón for Palou Motorsport.

== Sportscar racing career ==
=== 2022: GT4 Europe ===
Chovet returned to racing on a full-time basis in 2022, signing for Arkadia Racing to compete in the GT4 European Series alongside Stéphane Guérin in the Pro/Am class.

=== 2023: Full-time GT3 season ===
After competing part-time in the Lamborghini Super Trofeo Europe in 2022, Chovet stepped up to full-time GT3 racing in 2023. He joined Oregon Team in the International GT Open, driving alongside Maximilian Paul. Following a slow start to the season, Chovet and Paul ended up winning four races and scoring three further podiums, leading them to finish fourth in the championship. The pair also scored six pole positions, with two of them being taken by Chovet.

== Karting record ==
=== Karting career summary ===
Season	Series	Team	Position
2014	Championat de France — Cadet		40th
2015	Championnat Regional PACAC — Cadet		**3rd**
2015	National Series Karting— Cadet		18th
2015	Coupe de France — Cadet		23rd
2015	IAME International Final — X30 Junior		NC
2016	Trofeo Andrea Margutti — OKJ		28th
2016	WSK Super Master Series — OKJ		76th
2016	CIK-FIA European Championship — OKJ		40th
2016	IAME International Final — X30 Junior		NC
2017	Championat de France — Junior	Club Comtat Venaissi	**1st**
2019	Championat de France — KZ2		26th

=== Complete CIK-FIA Karting European Championship results ===
(key) (Races in bold indicate pole position) (Races in italics indicate fastest lap)

Year	Team	Class	1	2	3	4	5	6	7	8	9	10	11	12	DC	Points
2016	CRG SpA	OKJ	ZUE; QH; 55	ZUE; PF; 13	ZUE; R 17	ADR; QH; 68	ADR; PF; 26	ADR; R DNQ	PRT; QH; 34	PRT; PF; 14	PRT; R 34	GEN; QH; 62	GEN; PF; 22	GEN; R DNQ	40th	9

== Racing record ==
=== Racing career summary ===
Season	Series	Team	Races	Wins	Poles	F/Laps	Podiums	Points	Position
2017	French F4 Championship	FFSA Academy	9	1	0	0	1	0	NC†
2018	French F4 Championship	FFSA Academy	18	1	0	1	5	162	6th
2019	Euroformula Open Championship	RP Motorsport	7	0	0	0	0	2	23rd
2020	Formula Regional European Championship	Van Amersfoort Racing	23	1	1	3	7	244	5th
2020	FIA Formula 3 Championship	Hitech Grand Prix	4	0	0	0	0	5	19th
2021	F3 Asian Championship	Pinnacle Motorsport	15	6	2	3	7	241	**2nd**
2021	FIA Formula 3 Championship	Jenzer Motorsport	3	0	0	0	0	0	30th
2021	FIA Formula 3 Championship	Campos Racing	3	0	0	0	0	0	30th
2022	Formula Regional Asian Championship	BlackArts Racing	12	0	0	0	0	26	16th
2022	GT4 European Series - Silver	Arkadia Racing	2	0	1	0	0	1	24th
2022	Lamborghini Super Trofeo Europe - Pro	Arkadia Racing	4	0	0	0	0	?	?
2022	Formula Regional European Championship	RPM	6	0	0	0	2	0	NC†
2023	Eurocup-3	Drivex	2	0	0	0	0	14	16th
2023	International GT Open	Oregon Team	13	4	6	1	7	104	4th
2023	GT World Challenge Europe Endurance Cup	Iron Lynx	1	0	0	0	0	0	NC
2023	GT World Challenge Europe Endurance Cup - Gold Cup	Iron Lynx	1	0	1	0	0	1	13th
2023	Formula Regional European Championship	Saintéloc Racing	2	0	0	0	0	0	NC†
2024	Eurocup-3	Palou Motorsport	2	0	0	0	0	0	31st
2025	GT World Challenge Europe Endurance Cup	Team WRT	1	0	0	0	0	0	NC
2025	GT World Challenge Europe Endurance Cup - Silver	Team WRT	1	0	0	0	0	20	20th
2026	GT World Challenge Europe Endurance Cup	JMW Motorsport							

^{†} As Chovet was a guest driver, he was ineligible for points.
^{*} Season still in progress.

=== Complete French F4 Championship results ===
(key) (Races in bold indicate pole position) (Races in italics indicate fastest lap)

Year	1	2	3	4	5	6	7	8	9	10	11	12	13	14	15	16	17	18	19	20	21	Pos	Points
2017	NOG; 1	NOG; 2	NOG; 3	MNZ; 1	MNZ; 2	MNZ; 3	PAU; 1	PAU; 2	PAU; 3	SPA; 1	SPA; 2	SPA; 3	MAG; 1; 15	MAG; 2 DSQ	MAG; 3 EX	CAT; 1; 17	CAT; 2; 11	CAT; 3; 9	LEC; 1; 8	LEC; 2; 1	LEC; 3; 8	NC†	0
2018	NOG; 1; 5	NOG; 2; 3	NOG; 3 Ret	PAU; 1; 5	PAU; 2; 5	PAU; 3; 4	SPA; 1; 2	SPA; 2; 7	SPA; 3; 3	DIJ; 1; 3	DIJ; 2; 7	DIJ; 3; 7	MAG; 1	MAG; 2	MAG; 3	JER; 1; 7	JER; 2; 2	JER; 3; 4	LEC; 1; 8	LEC; 2; 1	LEC; 3; 6	6th	162

^{†} As Chovet was a guest driver, he was ineligible for points.

=== Complete Euroformula Open Championship results ===
(key) (Races in bold indicate pole position) (Races in italics indicate fastest lap)

Year	Team	1	2	3	4	5	6	7	8	9	10	11	12	13	14	15	16	17	18	Pos	Points
2019	RP Motorsport	LEC; 1; 14	LEC; 2 Ret	PAU; 1	PAU; 2	HOC; 1	HOC; 2	SPA; 1; 13	SPA; 2; 9	HUN; 1; 13	HUN; 2 DNS	RBR; 1 Ret	RBR; 2; 14	SIL; 1	SIL; 2	CAT; 1	CAT; 2	MNZ; 1	MNZ; 2	23rd	2

=== Complete Formula Regional European Championship results ===
(key) (Races in bold indicate pole position) (Races in italics indicate fastest lap)

Year	Team	1	2	3	4	5	6	7	8	9	10	11	12	13	14	15	16	17	18	19	20	21	22	23	24	DC	Points
2020	Van Amersfoort Racing	MIS; 1; 5	MIS; 2; 5	MIS; 3; 7	LEC; 1; 3	LEC; 2; 4	LEC; 3; 7	RBR; 1; 5	RBR; 2; 4	RBR; 3; 7	MUG; 1; 5	MUG; 2; 2	MUG; 3; 7	MNZ; 1; 11	MNZ; 2; 3	MNZ; 3; 5	**CAT**; **1**; 7	CAT; 2; 3	CAT; 3; 1	IMO; 1; 4	IMO; 2; 5	IMO; 3; 3	VLL; 1 Ret	VLL; 2 C	VLL; 3; 3	5th	244
2022	RPM	MNZ; 1	MNZ; 2	IMO; 1	IMO; 2	MCO; 1	MCO; 2	LEC; 1	LEC; 2	ZAN; 1	ZAN; 2	HUN; 1	HUN; 2	SPA; 1	SPA; 1	RBR; 1; 3	RBR; 2; 7	CAT; 1; 15	CAT; 2; 3	MUG; 1; 14	MUG; 2; 16					NC†	0
2023	Saintéloc Racing	IMO; 1	IMO; 2	CAT; 1	CAT; 2	HUN; 1	HUN; 2	SPA; 1	SPA; 2	MUG; 1	MUG; 2	LEC; 1	LEC; 2	RBR; 1	RBR; 2	MNZ; 1	MNZ; 2	ZAN; 1; 16	ZAN; 2; 12	HOC; 1	HOC; 2					NC†	0

^{*} Season still in progress.

† As Chovet was a guest driver, he was ineligible to score points.

=== Complete FIA Formula 3 Championship results ===
(key) (Races in bold indicate pole position; races in italics indicate points for the fastest lap of top ten finishers)

Year	Entrant	1	2	3	4	5	6	7	8	9	10	11	12	13	14	15	16	17	18	19	20	21	DC	Points
2020	Hitech Grand Prix	RBR; FEA	RBR; SPR	RBR; FEA	RBR; SPR	HUN; FEA	HUN; SPR	SIL; FEA	SIL; SPR	SIL; FEA	SIL; SPR	CAT; FEA	CAT; SPR	SPA; FEA; 22	SPA; SPR; Ret	MNZ; FEA; 19	MNZ; SPR; 6	MUG; FEA	MUG; SPR				19th	5
2021	Jenzer Motorsport	CAT; 1; 24	CAT; 2; 14	CAT; 3; 24																			30th	0
2021	Campos Racing				LEC; 1; 18	LEC; 2; 15	LEC; 3; 28†	RBR; 1	RBR; 2	RBR; 3	HUN; 1	HUN; 2	HUN; 3	SPA; 1	SPA; 2	SPA; 3	ZAN; 1	ZAN; 2	ZAN; 3	SOC; 1	SOC; 2	SOC; 3	30th	0

^{†} Driver did not finish the race, but was classified as they completed more than 90% of the race distance.

=== Complete Formula Regional Asian Championship results ===
(key) (Races in bold indicate pole position) (Races in italics indicate the fastest lap of top ten finishers)

Year	Entrant	1	2	3	4	5	6	7	8	9	10	11	12	13	14	15	DC	Points
2021	Pinnacle Motorsport	DUB; 1; 4	DUB; 2; 4	**DUB**; **3**; 1	ABU; 1; 5	ABU; 2; 5	**ABU**; **3**; 1	ABU; 1; 1	ABU; 2; 1	ABU; 3; 4	DUB; 1; 1	DUB; 2; 3	DUB; 3; 1	ABU; 1; 5	ABU; 2 Ret	ABU; 3; 5	2nd	241
2022	BlackArts Racing	ABU; 1	ABU; 2	ABU; 3	DUB; 1; 10	DUB; 2; 6	DUB; 3; 12	DUB; 1; 8	DUB; 2; 12	DUB; 3; 7	DUB; 1; 12	DUB; 2; 10	DUB; 3; 11	ABU; 1; 10	ABU; 2; 8	ABU; 3; 10	16th	26

=== Complete Eurocup-3 results ===
(key) (Races in bold indicate pole position) (Races in italics indicate fastest lap)

Year	Team	1	2	3	4	5	6	7	8	9	10	11	12	13	14	15	16	17	DC	Points
2023	Drivex	SPA; 1; 9	SPA; 2; 4	ARA; 1	ARA; 2	MNZ; 1	MNZ; 2	ZAN; 1	ZAN; 2	JER; 1	JER; 2	EST; 1	EST; 2	CRT; 1	CRT; 2	CAT; 1	CAT; 2		16th	14
2024	Palou Motorsport	SPA; 1	SPA; 2	RBR; 1	RBR; 2	POR; 1	POR; 2	POR; 3	LEC; 1	LEC; 2	ZAN; 1	ZAN; 2	ARA; 1; 17	ARA; 2 Ret	JER; 1	JER; 2	CAT; 1	CAT; 2	31st	0

^{*} Season still in progress.

=== Complete International GT Open results ===
Year	Team	Car	Class	1	2	3	4	5	6	7	8	9	10	11	12	13	Pos.	Points
2023	Oregon Team	Lamborghini Huracán GT3 Evo 2	Pro	PRT; 1; 10	PRT; 2; 10	SPA; 8	HUN; 1; 3	HUN; 2; 1	**LEC**; **1**; 15	**LEC**; **2**; 1	RBR; 1; 1	RBR; 2; 17	**MNZ**; **1**; 1	**MNZ**; **2**; 3	CAT; 1; 3	CAT; 2; 5	4th	104

^{*}Season still in progress.
