= Ulysse de Pauw =

Belgian racing driver (born 2001)

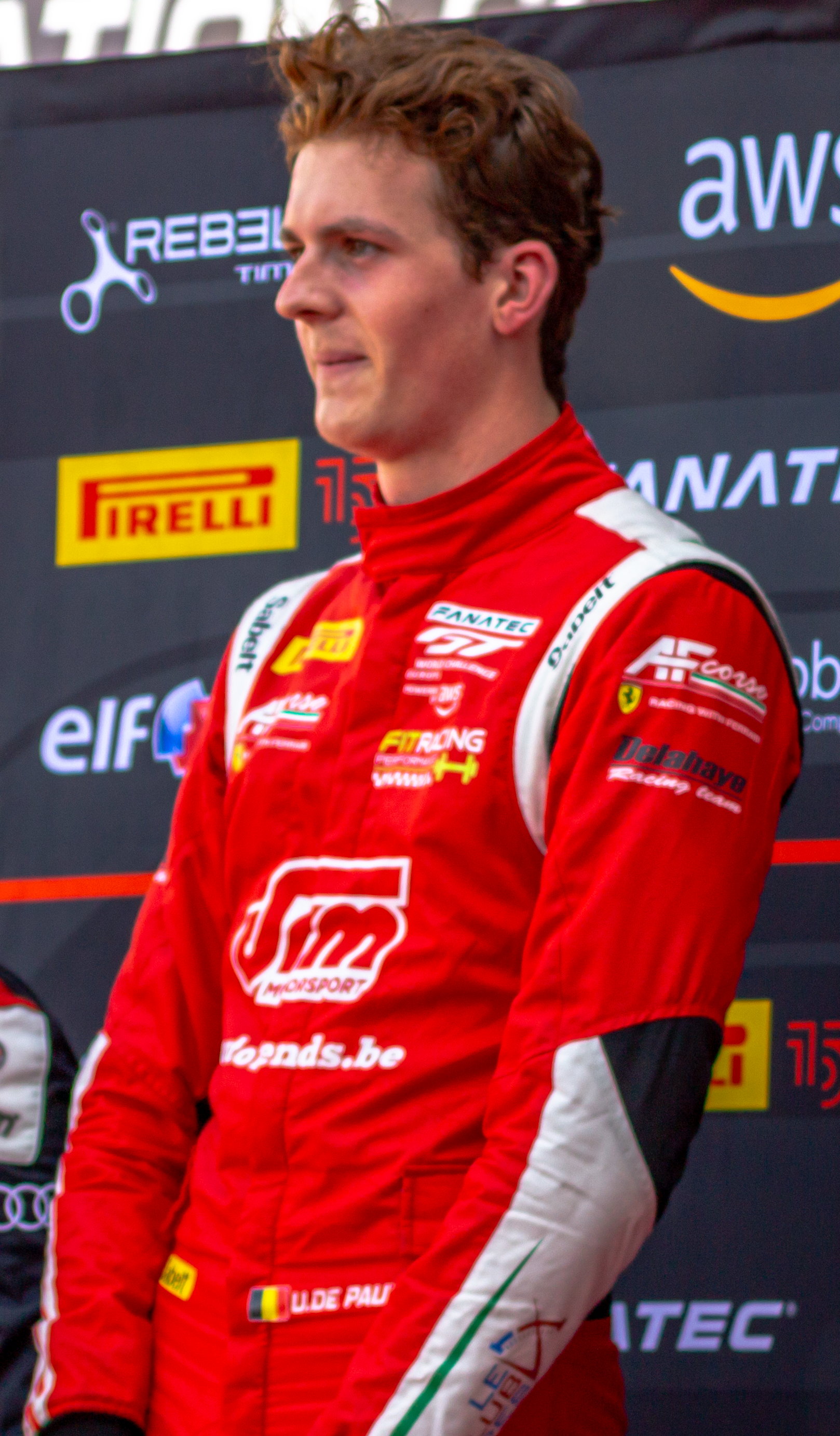
- De Pauw in 2022
- Nationality: (Belgium) Belgian
- Born: 3 September 2001 (age 25) Grez-Doiceau, Belgium

FIA World Endurance Championship career
- Debut season: 2023
- Current team: AF Corse
- Categorisation: FIA Silver (until 2022); FIA Gold (2023–)
- Car number: 21
- Starts: 0 (0 entries)
- Wins: 0
- Podiums: 0
- Poles: 0
- Fastest laps: 0
- Best finish: TBD (LMGTE Am) in 2023

Previous series
- 2021–2022 2021–2022 2019–2020 2018: GTWC Europe Endurance Cup; GTWC Europe Sprint Cup; BRDC British F3; French F4 Championship

Championship titles
- 2022: GTWC Europe Sprint Cup - Silver

Ulysse de Pauw (born 3 September 2001) is a Belgian professional racing driver who last competed in the 2024 24 Hours of Spa with Boutsen VDS. A race-winner in both French F4 and BRDC British F3 in his junior career, he won the GT World Challenge Europe Sprint Cup Silver Cup in 2022, having led his team to two overall poles and wins in the process.

== Career ==
De Pauw driving at Magny-Cours in the GT World Challenge Europe Sprint Cup (2022)

== Racing record ==
=== Career summary ===
Season	Series	Team	Races	Wins	Poles	F/Laps	Podiums	Points	Position
2018	French F4 Championship	FFSA Academy	21	1	0	1	5	180	5th
2018	25 Heures VW Fun Cup	Schtroumpftoyou Racing	1	0	0	0	0	N/A	7th
2019	BRDC British Formula 3 Championship	Douglas Motorsport	24	0	0	0	2	329	7th
2020	BRDC British Formula 3 Championship	Douglas Motorsport	24	2	0	6	10	392	4th
2021	GT World Challenge Europe Sprint Cup	CMR	10	0	0	0	1	22.5	13th
2021	GT World Challenge Europe Sprint Cup - Silver	CMR	10	0	1	1	3	66.5	6th
2021	GT World Challenge Europe Endurance Cup	CMR	1	0	0	0	0	0	NC
2021	GT World Challenge Europe Endurance Cup - Silver	CMR	1	0	0	0	0	8	29th
2021	European Le Mans Series - LMP3	Inter Europol Competition	2	0	0	0	0	12	23rd
2022	GT World Challenge Europe Sprint Cup	AF Corse	10	2	2	0	2	62.5	4th
2022	GT World Challenge Europe Sprint Cup - Silver	AF Corse	10	6	5	2	9	141.5	**1st**
2022	GT World Challenge Europe Endurance Cup	Belgian Audi Club Team WRT	1	0	0	0	0	0	NC
2022	GT World Challenge Europe Endurance Cup - Gold	Belgian Audi Club Team WRT	1	0	0	0	1	20	16th
2022	Intercontinental GT Challenge	AF Corse - Francorchamps	1	0	0	0	1	18	13th
2022	British GT Championship - GT3	RAM Racing	4	1	1	1	1	52	14th
2022	IMSA SportsCar Championship - GTD	Cetilar Racing	1	0	0	0	0	231	58th
2023	FIA World Endurance Championship - LMGTE Am	AF Corse	5	0	0	0	0	38	12th
2023	European Le Mans Series - LMGTE	AF Corse	6	0	0	0	0	35	8th
2023	IMSA SportsCar Championship - GTD Pro	AF Corse	1	0	0	0	0	253	25th
2023	GT World Challenge Europe Endurance Cup	AF Corse	1	0	0	0	0	0	NC
2023	24 Hours of Le Mans - LMGTE Am	AF Corse	1	0	0	0	0	N/A	DNF
2024	European Le Mans Series - LMGT3	AF Corse	1	0	0	0	0	4	16th
2024	GT World Challenge Europe Endurance Cup	Boutsen VDS	1	0	0	0	0	10	21st
2024	French GT4 Cup - Pro-Am	Team CMR							

^{†} As de Pauw was a guest driver, he was ineligible to score points.

=== Complete French F4 Championship results ===
(key) (Races in bold indicate pole position) (Races in italics indicate fastest lap)

Year	1	2	3	4	5	6	7	8	9	10	11	12	13	14	15	16	17	18	19	20	21	Pos	Points
2018	NOG; 1; 5	NOG; 2; 6	NOG; 3; 6	PAU; 1; 8	PAU; 2; 3	PAU; 3; 9	SPA; 1; 1	SPA; 2; 3	SPA; 3; 6	DIJ; 1; 6	DIJ; 2; 5	DIJ; 3; 3	MAG; 1; 6	MAG; 2; 3	MAG; 3; 8	JER; 1; 6	JER; 2; 5	JER; 3; 6	LEC; 1; 5	LEC; 2; 7	LEC; 3; 5	5th	180

=== Complete BRDC British Formula 3 Championship results ===
(key) (Races in bold indicate pole position) (Races in italics indicate fastest lap)

Year	Team	1	2	3	4	5	6	7	8	9	10	11	12	13	14	15	16	17	18	19	20	21	22	23	24	Pos	Points
2019	Douglas Motorsport	OUL; 1; 4	OUL; 2; 7^{3}	OUL; 3; 6	SNE; 1; 11	SNE; 2; 15	SNE; 3; 7	SIL1; 1; 7	SIL1; 2; 8^{2}	SIL1; 3; 11	DON1; 1; 5	DON1; 2; 7^{3}	DON1; 3; 2	SPA; 1; 7	SPA; 2; 9^{3}	SPA; 3; 18	BRH; 1; 7	BRH; 2; 6^{4}	BRH; 3; 3	SIL2; 1; 5	SIL2; 2; 6^{5}	SIL2; 3; 7	DON2; 1; 5	DON2; 2; 9^{2}	DON2; 3 Ret	7th	329
2020	Douglas Motorsport	OUL; 1; 2	OUL; 2; 11^{2}	OUL; 3 DSQ	OUL; 4; 11	DON1; 1; 18	DON1; 2; 1	DON1; 3; 8	BRH; 1; 3	BRH; 2; 7^{5}	BRH; 3 Ret	BRH; 4; 2	DON2; 1; 2	DON2; 2; 9^{6}	DON2; 3; 2	SNE; 1; 5	SNE; 2; 2^{7}	SNE; 3; 5	SNE; 4; 1	DON3; 1; 2	DON3; 2; 3^{4}	DON3; 3; 8	SIL; 1 Ret	SIL; 2; 13^{5}	SIL; 3; 15	4th	392

=== Complete European Le Mans Series results ===
(key) (Races in bold indicate pole position) (Races in italics indicate fastest lap)

Year	Entrant	Class	Chassis	Engine	1	2	3	4	5	6	Rank	Points
2021	Inter Europol Competition	LMP3	Ligier JS P320	Nissan VK56DE 5.6L V8	CAT	RBR; 4	LEC; NC	MNZ	SPA	ALG	23rd	12
2023	AF Corse	LMGTE	Ferrari 488 GTE Evo	Ferrari F154CB 3.9 L Turbo V8	LEC; 6	IMO; 11	MNZ; 10	CAT; 4	SPA; 6	ALG; 7	8th	35
2024	AF Corse	LMGT3	Ferrari 296 GT3	Ferrari F163CE 3.0 L Turbo V6	CAT; 8	LEC	IMO	SPA	MUG	ALG	16th	4

=== Complete GT World Challenge Europe results ===
==== GT World Challenge Europe Endurance Cup ====
(key) (Races in bold indicate pole position) (Races in italics indicate fastest lap)

Year	Team	Car	Class	1	2	3	4	5	6	7	Pos.	Points
2021	CMR	Bentley Continental GT3	Silver	MNZ	LEC	SPA; 6H; 20	SPA; 12H; 29	SPA; 24H; Ret	NÜR	CAT	29th	8
2022	Belgian Audi Club Team WRT	Audi R8 LMS Evo	Gold	IMO	LEC	SPA; 6H; 49	SPA; 12H; 40	SPA; 24H; 24	HOC	CAT	16th	20
2023	AF Corse	Ferrari 296 GT3	Pro-Am	MNZ	LEC	SPA; 6H; 55	SPA; 12H; 55	SPA; 24H; 43	NÜR	CAT	NC	0
2024	Boutsen VDS	Mercedes-AMG GT3 Evo	Pro	LEC	SPA; 6H; 2	SPA; 12H; 9	SPA; 24H; 18	NÜR	MNZ	JED	21st	10

==== GT World Challenge Europe Sprint Cup ====
(key) (Races in bold indicate pole position) (Races in italics indicate fastest lap)

Year	Team	Car	Class	1	2	3	4	5	6	7	8	9	10	Pos.	Points
2021	CMR	Bentley Continental GT3	Silver	MAG; 1; 9	MAG; 2; 7	ZAN; 1; 3	**ZAN**; **2**; 5	**MIS**; **1** Ret	MIS; 2; 16	BRH; 1; 7	BRH; 2; 12	VAL; 1 Ret	VAL; 2; 15	6th	66.5
2022	AF Corse	Ferrari 488 GT3 Evo 2020	Silver	**BRH**; **1**; 1	**BRH**; **2**; 5	MAG; 1; 7	**MAG**; **2**; 5	**ZAN**; **1**; 4	ZAN; 2; 9	MIS; 1; 8	**MIS**; **2**; 8	**VAL**; **1**; 1	VAL; 2; 17	1st	141.5

=== Complete IMSA SportsCar Championship results ===
(key) (Races in bold indicate pole position) (Races in italics indicate fastest lap)

Year	Team	Class	Make	Engine	1	2	3	4	5	6	7	8	9	10	11	12	Pos.	Points
2022	Cetilar Racing	GTD	Ferrari 488 GT3 Evo 2020	Ferrari F154CB 3.9 L Turbo V8	DAY	SEB	LBH	LGA	MDO	DET	WGL	MOS	LIM	ELK	VIR	PET; 10	58th	231
2023	AF Corse	GTD Pro	Ferrari 296 GT3	Ferrari F163 3.0 L Turbo V6	DAY	SEB	LBH	LGA	WGL; 8	MOS	LIM	ELK	VIR	IMS	PET		25th	253

=== Complete FIA World Endurance Championship results ===
(key) (Races in bold indicate pole position) (Races in italics indicate fastest lap)

Year	Entrant	Class	Car	Engine	1	2	3	4	5	6	7	Rank	Points
2023	AF Corse	LMGTE Am	Ferrari 488 GTE Evo	Ferrari F154CB 3.9 L Turbo V8	SEB; 4	PRT; 5	SPA; 6	LMS; Ret	MNZ; 9	FUJ	BHR	13th	38

^{*} Season still in progress.

=== Complete 24 Hours of Le Mans results ===
Year	Team	Co-Drivers	Car	Class	Laps	Pos.	Class Pos.
2023	(Italy) AF Corse	(United States) Simon Mann (France) Julien Piguet	Ferrari 488 GTE Evo	GTE; Am	21	DNF	DNF
