= Adam Eteki =

French racing driver (born 2002)

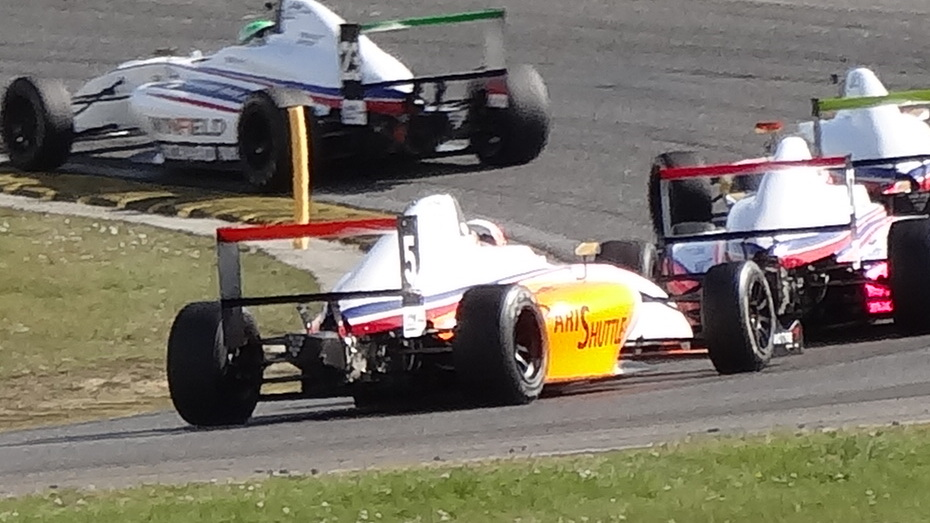
- Eteki in 2018
- Nationality: (France) French
- Born: 5 July 2002 (age 24) Paris, France
- Categorisation: FIA Silver (2021); FIA Gold (2022–)

Adam Eteki (born 5 July 2002) is a French racing driver who last competed for CSA Racing in GT World Challenge Europe Endurance Cup.

== Career ==
Eteki began karting in 2011, spending two years in mini karts during which he most notably finished third in the 2012 French Minime-Cadet Championship. Stepping up to Cadet karts for the following two years, Eteki won the Rotax Max Challenge France title in 2014, before stepping up to Junior karting for the following year. In his two years in the category, Eteki won the 2016 X30 Challenge Europe, as well as the 2015 Coupe de France in the Nationale class. During his only year of senior karting in 2017, Eteki most notably finished fourth in the Coupe de France and eighth in the Andrea Margutti Trophy.

After making his single-seater debut in the Barcelona round of the 2017 French F4 Championship, Eteki remained in the series the following year for his only full-time season in the series. Opening up the season with wins at Nogaro and Pau, Eteki then finished on the podium six more times in the following five rounds en route to a fourth-place points finish. At the end of the year, Eteki became a Porsche Carrera Cup France Rising Star, earning him a scholarship to race in the series the following year. Competing for Team 85 Bourgoin Racing in his rookie year, Eteki scored a best result of fourth in the season-ending Le Castellet round to end the year eighth in points. Switching to CLRT for his sophomore season, Eteki scored a lone win at Le Castellet and finished on the podium at Le Mans en route to a sixth-place points finish.

Switching to endurance racing for 2021, Eteki joined CD Sport to race in the LMP3 class of the Asian Le Mans Series at the start of the year. In the four-race series, Eteki scored a best result of fourth in the Abu Dhabi finale to finish eighth in the LMP3 standings. For the rest of the year, Eteki continued to race LMP3 machinery, as he remained with the team to compete in the Le Mans Cup, in which he took a best result of fifth at Algarve. During 2021, Eteki also competed in the 4 Hours of Portimão for Inter Europol Competition, winning in LMP3 on his ELMS debut.

The following year, Eteki joined Audi-fielding Boutsen Racing to race in the GT World Challenge Europe Endurance Cup, in which he finished 12th in the Gold Cup standings. During 2022, Eteki made a one-off appearance to the LMP3 class of the Le Mans Cup at Imola for CD Sport, finishing fifth on his return to the series. Continuing with Boutsen VDS for 2023, Eteki raced with them in both the GT World Challenge Europe Endurance and Sprint Cups. In the former, Eteki took a Gold Cup win at Barcelona to finish fourth in points, whereas in the latter, Eteki scored a lone Gold Cup win at Zandvoort to also end the season fourth in the standings. Continuing in the Endurance Cup for 2024, Eteki switched to fellow Audi-fielding team CSA Racing for his third season in the series. After scoring a Gold Cup podium at Le Castellet and racing at the 24 Hours of Spa, Eteki left the team and was replaced by Hugo Cook for the remaining rounds.

== Karting record ==
=== Karting career summary ===
| Season | Series | Team | Position |
|---|---|---|---|
| 2011 | Ouverture de Soucy — Mini Kart | | 4th |
| 2011 | Championnat Regional Ile de France — Minime | | 7th |
| 2011 | Trophée Kart Mag — Mini Kart | | 11th |
| 2011 | Championnat Regional Bourgogne Franche-Comte — Minime | | 35th |
| 2011 | Coupe de France — Minime | Ile-De-France | 20th |
| 2012 | Trophée Oscar Petit — Minime | | 5th |
| 2012 | Sens Trophy — Minime | | 9th |
| 2012 | Championnat Regional Ile de France — Minime | | 3rd |
| 2012 | Championnat Regional Pacac — Minime | | 20th |
| 2012 | Championnat de France — Minime | | 3rd |
| 2012 | Bridgestone Cup — Minime | | NC |
| 2012 | Trophée Interclub — Minime | | 10th |
| 2012 | Trophée Kart Mag — Minime | | NC |
| 2012 | Championnat Regional Bourgogne Franche-Comte — Minime | | 27th |
| 2012 | Coupe de France — Minime | | 35th |
| 2013 | Regional Stars — Cadet | | |
| 2013 | Trophée Interclub — Cadet | | 1st |
| 2013 | Sens Trophy — Cadet | | 19th |
| 2013 | Championnat Regional Ile de France — Cadet | | 4th |
| 2013 | Championnat de France — Cadet | SG Drivers | 25th |
| 2013 | National Series Karting — Cadet | | |
| 2013 | Challenge Rotax Max France — Cadet | | 8th |
| 2014 | Stars of Karting — Cadet | | 1st |
| 2014 | Championnat Regional Ile de France — Cadet | | 14th |
| 2014 | Championnat de France — Cadet | SG Drivers | 3rd |
| 2014 | Challenge Rotax Max France — Cadet | | 1st |
| 2014 | Coupe de France — Cadet | SG Drivers | 28th |
| 2015 | Rotax Max Winter Cup — Junior Max | | 19th |
| 2015 | Trophée Interclub — Nationale | | 1st |
| 2015 | Trophée Oscar Petit — Nationale | | 1st |
| 2015 | RMC Euro Trophy — Junior Max | SG Drivers | 6th |
| 2015 | National Series Karting — Nationale | SG Drivers | 11th |
| 2015 | BNL Karting Series — Rotax Max Junior | | 19th |
| 2015 | Championnat de France — Nationale | SG Drivers | 5th |
| 2015 | Coupe de France — Nationale | SG Drivers | 1st |
| 2015 | Rotax International Open — Junior Max | | 19th |
| 2015 | IAME International Final — X30 Junior | | NC |
| 2016 | South Garda Winter Cup — OK-J | Steeve Guarato | 30th |
| 2016 | Andrea Margutti Trophy — OK-J | Cathy Eteki | 7th |
| 2016 | X30 Challenge Europa — Junior | | 1st |
| 2016 | Deutsche Kart-Meisterschaft — OK-J | Cathy Eteki | 17th |
| 2016 | Karting European Championship — OK-J | Cathy Eteki | 30th |
| 2016 | WSK Super Master Series — OK-J | Cathy Eteki | 42nd |
| 2016 | WSK Final Cup — OK-J | CRG | 22nd |
| 2016 | IAME International Final — X30 Junior | | NC |
| 2016 | Karting World Championship — OK-J | CRG | 10th |
| 2017 | WSK Champions Cup — OK | Chiesa Corse | 15th |
| 2017 | WSK Super Master Series — OK | Chiesa Corse | 26th |
| 2017 | Andrea Margutti Trophy — OK | Chiesa Corse | 8th |
| 2017 | South Garda Winter Cup — OK | Chiesa Corse | 28th |
| 2017 | Karting European Championship — OK | Chiesa Corse | 39th |
| 2017 | Coupe de France — OK | Chiesa Corse | 4th |
| 2017 | Karting World Championship — OK | Chiesa Corse | 12th |
| 2017 | Deutsche Kart-Meisterschaft — OK | | 24th |

== Racing record ==
=== Racing career summary ===
| Season | Series | Team | Races | Wins | Poles | F/Laps | Podiums | Points | Position |
|---|---|---|---|---|---|---|---|---|---|
| 2017 | French F4 Championship | FFSA Academy | 3 | 0 | 0 | 0 | 0 | 0 | NC† |
| 2018 | French F4 Championship | FFSA Academy | 20 | 2 | 2 | 4 | 9 | 192 | 4th |
| 2019 | Porsche Carrera Cup France | Team 85 / Bourgoin Racing | 10 | 0 | 0 | 0 | 0 | 81 | 8th |
| 2020 | Porsche Carrera Cup France | CLRT | 10 | 1 | 0 | 2 | 3 | 134 | 6th |
| 2020 | Porsche Supercup | CLRT | 3 | 0 | 0 | 0 | 0 | 0 | NC† |
| 2021 | Asian Le Mans Series – LMP3 | CD Sport | 4 | 0 | 0 | 1 | 0 | 26 | 8th |
| 2021 | Le Mans Cup – LMP3 | CD Sport | 7 | 0 | 0 | 0 | 0 | 25.5 | 15th |
| 2021 | Belcar Endurance – Prototype | Mc Donald's Racing | 1 | 0 | 0 | 0 | 1 | 62 | 9th |
| 2021 | European Le Mans Series – LMP3 | Inter Europol Competition | 1 | 1 | 0 | 0 | 1 | 25 | 13th |
| 2022 | GT World Challenge Europe Endurance Cup | Boutsen Racing | 5 | 0 | 0 | 0 | 0 | 0 | NC |
| 2022 | GT World Challenge Europe Endurance Cup – Gold | Boutsen Racing | 5 | 0 | 0 | 0 | 0 | 27 | 12th |
| 2022 | Le Mans Cup – LMP3 | CD Sport | 1 | 0 | 0 | 0 | 0 | 10 | 23rd |
| 2023 | GT World Challenge Europe Endurance Cup | Boutsen VDS | 5 | 0 | 0 | 0 | 0 | 0 | NC |
| 2023 | GT World Challenge Europe Endurance Cup – Gold | Boutsen VDS | 5 | 1 | 0 | 1 | 2 | 83 | 4th |
| 2023 | GT World Challenge Europe Sprint Cup | Boutsen VDS | 10 | 0 | 0 | 0 | 0 | 4.5 | 19th |
| 2023 | GT World Challenge Europe Sprint Cup – Gold | Boutsen VDS | 10 | 1 | 0 | 1 | 6 | 93 | 4th |
| 2023 | Lamborghini Super Trofeo Europe – Pro | Boutsen VDS | 2 | 0 | 0 | 0 | 0 | 2.5 | 15th |
| 2024 | GT World Challenge Europe Endurance Cup | CSA Racing | 2 | 0 | 0 | 0 | 0 | 0 | NC |
| 2024 | GT World Challenge Europe Endurance Cup – Gold | CSA Racing | 2 | 0 | 0 | 0 | 1 | 23 | 13th |

^{†} As Eteki was a guest driver, he was ineligible for championship points.

=== Complete French F4 Championship results ===
(key) (Races in bold indicate pole position) (Races in italics indicate fastest lap)

| Year | 1 | 2 | 3 | 4 | 5 | 6 | 7 | 8 | 9 | 10 | 11 | 12 | 13 | 14 | 15 | 16 | 17 | 18 | 19 | 20 | 21 | Pos | Points |
|---|---|---|---|---|---|---|---|---|---|---|---|---|---|---|---|---|---|---|---|---|---|---|---|
| 2017 | NOG; 1 | NOG; 2 | NOG; 3 | MNZ; 1 | MNZ; 2 | MNZ; 3 | PAU; 1 | PAU; 2 | PAU; 3 | SPA; 1 | SPA; 2 | SPA; 3 | MAG; 1 | MAG; 2 | MAG; 3 | CAT; 1; 15 | CAT; 2; 12 | CAT; 3; 17 | LEC; 1 | LEC; 2 | LEC; 3 | NC† | 0† |
| 2018 | NOG; 1; 2 | NOG; 2; 8 | **NOG**; **3**; 1 | PAU; 1; 9 | PAU; 2; 1 | PAU; 3; 7 | SPA; 1; 6 | SPA; 2 Ret | SPA; 3; 8 | DIJ; 1; 2 | DIJ; 2; 7 | **DIJ**; **3**; 2 | MAG; 1; 3 | MAG; 2; 8 | MAG; 3; 4 | JER; 1; 17‡ | JER; 2 DNS | JER; 3; 11 | LEC; 1; 3 | LEC; 2; 3 | LEC; 3; 2 | 4th | 192 |

^{†} As Eteki was a guest driver, he was ineligible for championship points.

^{‡} Did not finish, but was classified as he had completed more than 90% of the race distance.

=== Complete Porsche Carrera Cup France results ===
(key) (Races in bold indicate pole position) (Races in italics indicate fastest lap)

| Year | Team | 1 | 2 | 3 | 4 | 5 | 6 | 7 | 8 | 9 | 10 | 11 | 12 | Pos | Points |
|---|---|---|---|---|---|---|---|---|---|---|---|---|---|---|---|
| 2019 | Team 85 Bourgoin Racing | NOG; 1; 13 | NOG; 2; 6 | SPA; 1 Ret | SPA; 2; 12 | MIS; 1; 5 | MIS; 2 Ret | MAG; 1; 6 | MAG; 2 Ret | CAT; 1 DSQ | CAT; 2; 6 | LEC; 1; 5 | LEC; 2; 4 | 8th | 81 |
| 2020 | CLRT | MAG; 1; 4 | MAG; 2; 7 | LMS; 2 | LEC; 1; 1 | LEC; 2; 6 | LEC; 3; 6 | SPA; 1; 8 | SPA; 2; 6 | CAT; 1; 5 | CAT; 2; 4 | | | 6th | 134 |

=== Complete Porsche Supercup results ===
(key) (Races in bold indicate pole position) (Races in italics indicate fastest lap)

| Year | Team | 1 | 2 | 3 | 4 | 5 | 6 | 7 | 8 | Pos. | Points |
|---|---|---|---|---|---|---|---|---|---|---|---|
| 2020 | CLRT | RBR | RBR | HUN | SIL | SIL | CAT; 19 | SPA; 23 | MNZ; 16 | NC† | 0 |

^{†} As Eteki was a guest driver, he was ineligible to score points.

=== Complete Asian Le Mans Series results ===
(key) (Races in bold indicate pole position) (Races in italics indicate fastest lap)

| Year | Team | Class | Car | Engine | 1 | 2 | 3 | 4 | Pos. | Points |
|---|---|---|---|---|---|---|---|---|---|---|
| 2021 | CD Sport | LMP3 | Ligier JS P320 | Nissan VK56DE 5.6 L V8 | DUB; 1; 7 | DUB; 2; 6 | ABU; 1 Ret | ABU; 2; 4 | 8th | 26 |

=== Complete Le Mans Cup results ===
(key) (Races in bold indicate pole position; results in italics indicate fastest lap)

| Year | Entrant | Class | Chassis | 1 | 2 | 3 | 4 | 5 | 6 | 7 | Rank | Points |
|---|---|---|---|---|---|---|---|---|---|---|---|---|
| 2021 | CD Sport | LMP3 | Ligier JS P320 | BAR; 17 | LEC; 7 | MNZ; 10 | LMS; 1; 6 | LMS; 2; 11 | SPA; 18 | POR; 5 | 15th | 25.5 |
| 2022 | CD Sport | LMP3 | Ligier JS P320 | LEC | IMO; 5 | LMS; 1 | LMS; 2 | MNZ | SPA | ALG | 23rd | 10 |

=== Complete European Le Mans Series results ===
(key) (Races in bold indicate pole position; results in italics indicate fastest lap)

| Year | Entrant | Class | Chassis | Engine | 1 | 2 | 3 | 4 | 5 | 6 | Rank | Points |
|---|---|---|---|---|---|---|---|---|---|---|---|---|
| 2021 | Inter Europol Competition | LMP3 | Ligier JS P320 | Nissan VK56DE 5.6L V8 | CAT | RBR | LEC | MNZ | SPA | ALG; 1 | 13th | 25 |

=== Complete GT World Challenge results ===
==== GT World Challenge Europe Endurance Cup ====
(Races in bold indicate pole position) (Races in italics indicate fastest lap)

| Year | Team | Car | Class | 1 | 2 | 3 | 4 | 5 | 6 | 7 | Pos. | Points |
|---|---|---|---|---|---|---|---|---|---|---|---|---|
| 2022 | Boutsen Racing | Audi R8 LMS Evo II | Gold | IMO; 31 | LEC; 34 | SPA; 6H; 56 | SPA; 12H; Ret | SPA; 24H; Ret | HOC; 23 | CAT; 32 | 12th | 27 |
| 2023 | Boutsen VDS | Audi R8 LMS Evo II | Gold | MNZ; Ret | LEC; 11 | SPA; 6H; 14 | SPA; 12H; 46 | SPA; 24H; 42 | NUR; 12 | CAT; 13 | 4th | 83 |
| 2024 | CSA Racing | Audi R8 LMS Evo II | Gold | LEC; 18 | SPA; 6H; 51 | SPA; 12H; 54† | SPA; 24H; Ret | NÜR | MNZ | JED | 13th | 23 |

==== GT World Challenge Europe Sprint Cup ====
(Races in bold indicate pole position) (Races in italics indicate fastest lap)

| Year | Team | Car | Class | 1 | 2 | 3 | 4 | 5 | 6 | 7 | 8 | 9 | 10 | Pos. | Points |
|---|---|---|---|---|---|---|---|---|---|---|---|---|---|---|---|
| 2023 | Boutsen VDS | Audi R8 LMS Evo II | Gold | BRH; 1; 12 | BRH; 2; 28† | MIS; 1; 14 | MIS; 2; 17 | HOC; 1; 6 | HOC; 2; 19 | VAL; 1; 36† | VAL; 2; 24 | ZAN; 1; 11 | ZAN; 2; 26† | 4th | 93 |
