= Marvin Klein =

French racing driver (born 1999)

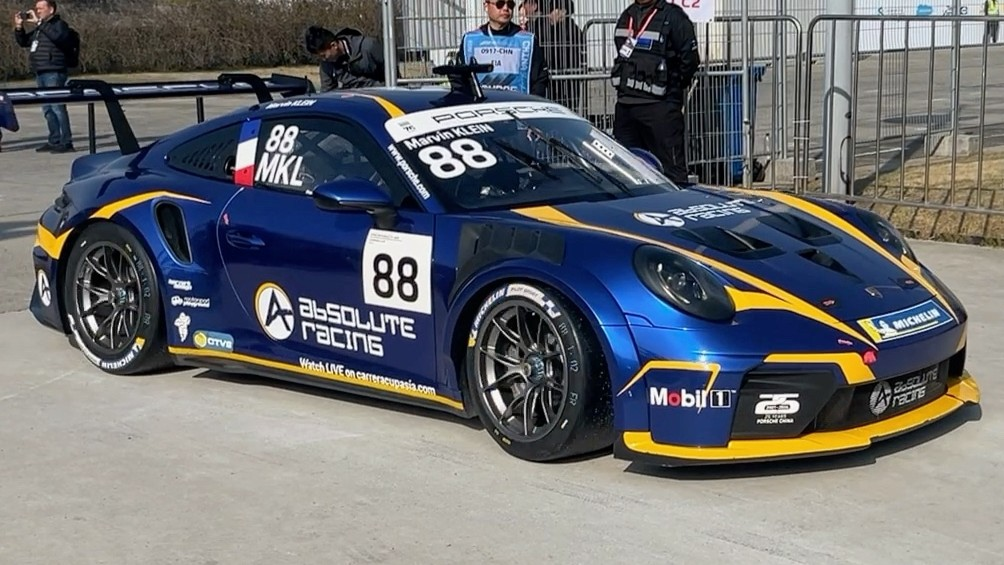
- Klein driving in the 2026 Porsche Carrera Cup Asia
- Nationality: (France) French
- Born: Marvin Édouard Jean-François Klein; 21 June 1999 (age 27) Saint-Maximin-la-Sainte-Baume, France
- Categorisation: FIA Silver (until 2022); FIA Gold (2023–)

Championship titles
- 2021–2022, 2026: Porsche Carrera Cup France

Marvin Édouard Jean-François Klein (born 21 June 1999 in Saint-Maximin-la-Sainte-Baume) is a French racing driver. He is a three-time champion of Porsche Carrera Cup France.

== Career ==
Klein made his single-seater debut in 2016, racing in the FFSA Academy centrally-run French F4 Championship. In his maiden season in single-seaters, Klein took a lone win at the reverse grid race at Le Mans and finished 12th in points. Returning to French F4 for 2017, Klein won the first race at Magny-Cours and concluded the season tenth in the standings.

Despite being announced to be competing in the LMP2 class of the 2018 European Le Mans Series for Duqueine Engineering, Klein only raced a handful of times in 2018, making a handful of appearances for DKR Engineering in ELMS and also racing for Cool Racing in the Road to Le Mans.

In 2019, Klein joined Pierre Martinet by Alméras to compete in his maiden season in Porsche Carrera Cup France. Scoring his first podium second time out at Nogaro, Klein took his first win at Spa and ended the season sixth overall and second in the rookie standings.

The following year, Klein returned to Pierre Martinet by Alméras to race full-time in both Porsche Carrera Cup France and Porsche Supercup. In the former, Klein won at Spa and scored four more podiums to end the season fifth in points. In the latter, the French driver took a best result of fourth at the Hungaroring and finished seventh in points.

Joining CLRT for 2021, Klein stayed in the French championship but scaled back his Supercup program to four races. In his third season in the series, Klein swept both the Spa and Barcelona rounds, also taking wins at Monza and Portimão to win his first Carrera Cup France title by three points over Florian Latorre. At the end of the year, Klein participated in the Porsche Junior Shootout at MotorLand Aragón.

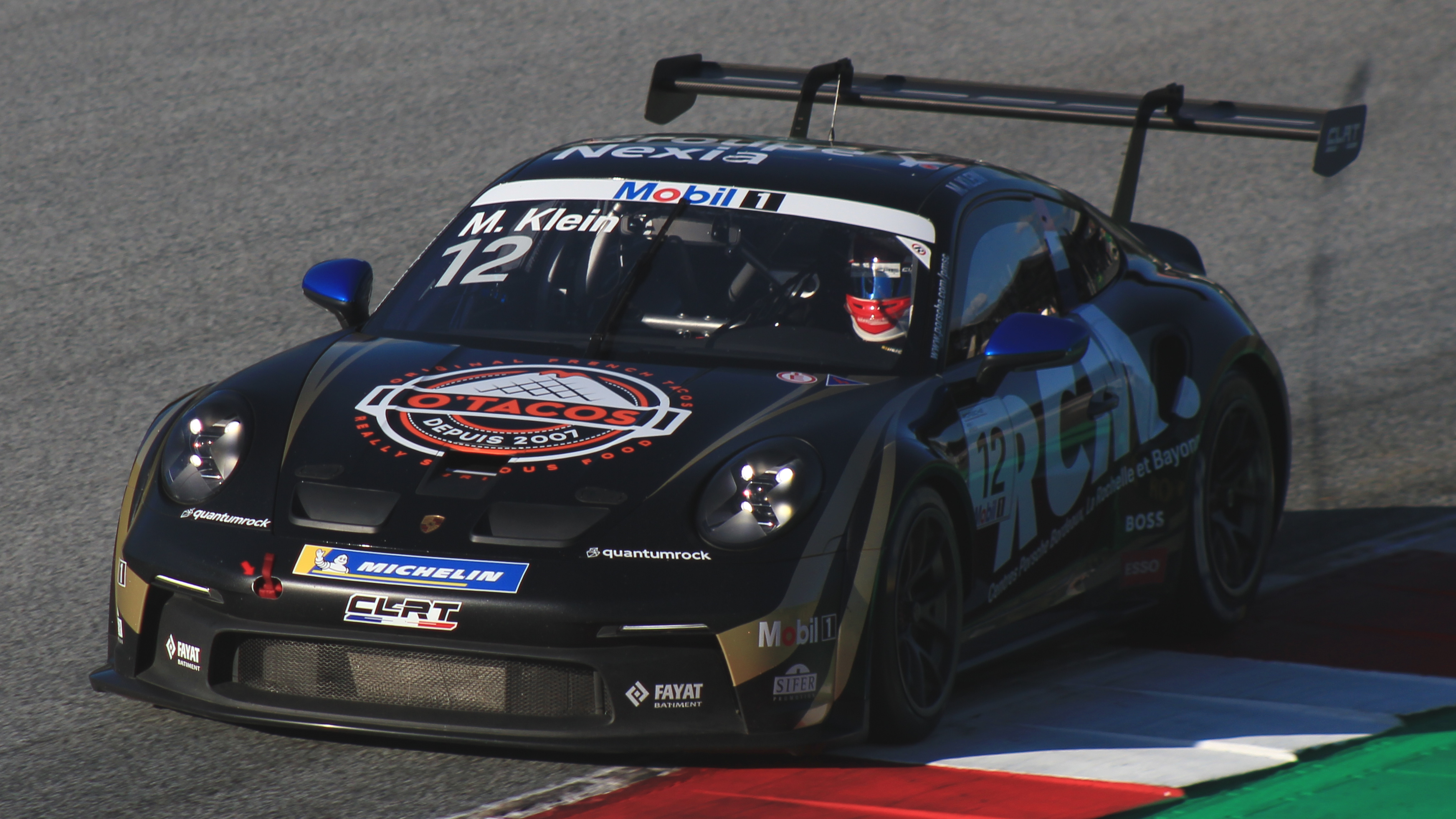
Klein at the Red Bull Ring in 2022

Staying with CLRT for 2022, Klein returned to both Carrera Cup France and Supercup on a full-time basis. In the former he swept the rounds at Nogaro, Magny-Cours and Le Castellet, along with a win at Valencia to win his second consecutive Carrera Cup France title ahead of Dorian Boccolacci. Meanwhile in Supercup, Klein took his maiden win at Zandvoort and finished sixth in points. During 2022, Klein made his debut at the 24 Hours of Le Mans, racing in the LMGTE Am class for Inception Racing alongside Côme Ledogar and Alexander West.

Switching to TFT Racing for 2023, Klein won both races at the Red Bull Ring and took more wins at Magny-Cours and Le Mans to finish third in points. Towards the end of the year, Klein joined Target Competition for the Imola round of Porsche Carrera Cup Italy. In the two races, Klein won race one from the pole and finished third in race two.

Klein returned to CLRT for the 2024 Porsche Supercup season, winning at Spa and ending the season third in points. The French driver also returned to Target Competition to race in both Porsche Carrera Cup Germany and Porsche Carrera Cup Italy. In the former, Klein took a lone win at the Hungaroring and finished the season 10th in points. In the latter, Klein swept the second Imola round and also won at Mugello to finish third in points and helping the team win the team's championship.

In 2025, Klein stayed with ABM for a seventh season in Porsche Carrera Cup France and also joined Proton Huber Competition, BeDriver and Lechner Racing to remain in Porsche Carrera Cup Germany, Porsche Carrera Cup Italy and Porsche Supercup. In the former, Klein won at Misano and Le Castellet to end the year runner-up in points, while in the German series, Klein stood on the podiums at Imola and Zandvoort to end the season tenth in points. In Italy, Klein won both races at Imola and scored further wins at Mugello and Misano as he ended the season runner-up to Keagan Masters, while in Supercup, Klein won at the Red Bull Ring and finished on the podium at Barcelona en route to a fourth-place points finish.

At the start of the following year, Klein returned to TFT Racing to compete in the UAE rounds of the 2025–26 24H Series Middle East in GT3 Pro-Am. For the rest of 2026, Klein joined Absolute Racing to compete in select rounds Porsche Carrera Cup Asia, as well as returning to ABM for another season in Porsche Carrera Cup France. In France, Klein raced in the first five rounds, taking five wins and missing the podium only once en route to his third PCCF title, whereas in his limited outings in Asia, he took three podiums. During 2026, Klein also made sporadic outings in the Intercontinental GT Challenge, 24H Series and the GT World Challenge Europe Endurance Cup for AMG-fielding GetSpeed Team PCX Racing.

== Racing record ==
=== Racing career summary ===
Season	Series	Team	Races	Wins	Poles	F/Laps	Podiums	Points	Position
2016	French F4 Championship	FFSA Academy	23	1	0	0	1	55	12th
2017	French F4 Championship	FFSA Academy	21	1	0	1	2	98	10th
2018	V de V Endurance Series – LMP3	Cool Racing	2	0	0	0	0	0	NC
2018	Le Mans Cup – LMP3	Cool Racing	2	0	0	0	0	1	42nd
2018	V de V Endurance Series – CNA	Equipe Palmyr	1	0	0	0	0	0	NC
2018	European Le Mans Series – LMP3	DKR Engineering	2	0	0	0	0	2.25	29th
2018	24H GT Series – A6 Pro	IDEC Sport Racing	1	0	0	0	1	0	NC
2019	Porsche Supercup	Pierre Martinet by Alméras	1	0	0	0	0	8	16th
2019	Porsche Supercup	Martinet by Alméras	1	0	0	0	0	8	16th
2019	Porsche Carrera Cup France	Pierre Martinet by Alméras	12	1	0	0	3	109	6th
2020	Porsche Carrera Cup France	Martinet by Alméras	10	1	1	0	5	147	5th
2020	Porsche Supercup	Martinet by Alméras	8	0	0	0	0	75	7th
2020	Dutch Winter Endurance Series	Martinet by Alméras	1	0	0	0	0	4	50th
2021	Porsche Carrera Cup France	CLRT	12	6	2	4	9	232	**1st**
2021	Porsche Supercup	CLRT	4	0	1	0	0	0	NC†
2022	Porsche Carrera Cup France	CLRT	12	7	7	7	11	271	**1st**
2022	Porsche Supercup	CLRT	8	1	2	2	1	78	6th
2022	24 Hours of Le Mans – LMGTE Am	Inception Racing	1	0	0	0	0	N/A	DNF
2023	Porsche Carrera Cup France	TFT Racing	11	4	3	2	5	184	**3rd**
2023	Porsche Supercup	Ombra Racing	6	0	0	0	0	0	NC†
2023	Porsche Carrera Cup Italy	Target Competition	2	1	1	2	2	49	14th
2024	Porsche Carrera Cup France	ABM	4	0	0	0	1	62	10th
2024	Porsche Supercup	Schumacher CLRT	8	1	2	3	5	121	**3rd**
2024	Porsche Carrera Cup Germany	Target Competition	14	1	1	1	2	113	10th
2024	Porsche Carrera Cup Italy	Target Competition	12	2	1	0	7	176	**3rd**
2025	Porsche Carrera Cup Germany	Proton Huber Competition	14	0	0	1	2	114	10th
2025	Porsche Carrera Cup France	ABM	11	2	0	3	7	187	**2nd**
2025	Porsche Carrera Cup Italy	BeDriver	10	4	1	1	6	181	**2nd**
2025	Porsche Supercup	BWT Lechner Racing	8	1	0	0	2	78	4th
2025–26	24H Series Middle East – GT3 Pro-Am	TFT Racing	2	0	0	0	0	18	7th
2026	Porsche Carrera Cup Asia	Absolute Racing	6	0	1	0	3	78	9th
2026	Porsche Carrera Cup France	ABM	10	5	5	7	9	226	**1st**
2026	24H Series – GT3 Pro-Am	GetSpeed Team PCX Racing	1	0	0	0	1	32	17th
2026	GT World Challenge Europe Endurance Cup	GetSpeed Team PCX Racing	2	0	0	0	0	0	NC
2026	GT World Challenge Europe Endurance Cup – Bronze	GetSpeed Team PCX Racing	1	0	0	0	0	0	NC†
2026	Le Mans Cup – GT3	GetSpeed Team PCX Racing	0	0	0	0	0	0	NC†
2026	Intercontinental GT Challenge	GetSpeed Team PCX Racing	2	0	0	0	0	0	NC
2026	GT World Challenge America – Pro-Am	GetSpeed Team PCX Racing	1	0	0	0	0	0	NC†

† As Klein was a guest driver, he was ineligible for points

=== Complete French F4 Championship results ===
(key) (Races in bold indicate pole position) (Races in italics indicate fastest lap)

Year	1	2	3	4	5	6	7	8	9	10	11	12	13	14	15	16	17	18	19	20	21	22	23	Pos	Points
2016	LEC; 1; 12	LEC; 2; 8	LEC; 3; 10	LEC; 4; 14	PAU; 1 Ret	PAU; 2 Ret	PAU; 3; 12	PAU; 4; 8	LÉD; 1; 15	LÉD; 2; 11	LÉD; 3; 10	LÉD; 4; 13	MAG; 1; 9	MAG; 2; 14	MAG; 3; 9	MAG; 4; 10	LMS; 1; 6	LMS; 2; 1	LMS; 3; 11	LMS; 4; 13	CAT; 1; 13	CAT; 2; 9	CAT; 3; 11	12th	55
2017	NOG; 1; 5	NOG; 2; 9	NOG; 3; 5	MNZ; 1; 9	MNZ; 2; 5	MNZ; 3; 4	PAU; 1; 3	PAU; 2; 9	PAU; 3; 14	SPA; 1; 14	SPA; 2 Ret	SPA; 3; 14	MAG; 1; 1	MAG; 2; 14	MAG; 3; 10	CAT; 1; 13	CAT; 2; 9	CAT; 3; 15	LEC; 1; 12	LEC; 2; 11	LEC; 3; 9			10th	98

=== Complete Le Mans Cup results ===
(key) (Races in bold indicate pole position; results in italics indicate fastest lap)

Year	Entrant	Class	Chassis	1	2	3	4	5	6	7	Rank	Points
2018	Cool Racing	LMP3	Ligier JS P3	LEC	MNZ	LMS; 1; 17	LMS; 2; 16	RBR	SPA	ALG	42nd	1
2026	GetSpeed Team PCX	GT3	Mercedes-AMG GT3 Evo	CAT	LEC	LMS; WD	SPA	SIL	ALG		NC	0

=== Complete European Le Mans Series results ===
(key) (Races in bold indicate pole position; results in italics indicate fastest lap)

Year	Entrant	Class	Chassis	Engine	1	2	3	4	5	6	Rank	Points
2018	DKR Engineering	LMP3	Norma M30	Nissan VK50VE 5.0 L V8	LEC	MNZ	RBR	SIL	SPA; 11	ALG; 9	29th	2.25

=== Complete Porsche Supercup results ===
(key) (Races in bold indicate pole position) (Races in italics indicate fastest lap)

Year	Team	1	2	3	4	5	6	7	8	9	10	DC	Points
2019	Pierre Martinet by Alméras	CAT	MON	RBR; 8								16th	8
2019	Martinet by Alméras				SIL	HOC	HUN	SPA; Ret	MNZ	MEX	MEX	16th	8
2020	Martinet by Alméras	RBR; 7	RBR; 6	HUN; 4	SIL; 7	SIL; 6	CAT; 9	SPA; 7	MNZ; 10			7th	75
2021	CLRT	MON	RBR	RBR	**HUN**; DSQ	SPA; 6	ZND	MNZ; 6	MNZ; 12			NC†	0
2022	CLRT	IMO; 15	MON; 7	SIL; 11	RBR; 28	LEC; 6	SPA; 4	**ZND**; 1	**MNZ**; 6			6th	78
2023	Ombra Racing	MON	RBR	SIL; 15	HUN; 10	SPA; 9	ZND; 8	ZND; 7	MNZ; Ret			NC†	0
2024	Schumacher CLRT	IMO; 3	MON; 5	**RBR**; 3	SIL; 2	HUN; 2	**SPA**; 1	ZAN; 26†	MNZ; 6			3rd	121
2025	BWT Lechner Racing	IMO; Ret	MON; Ret	CAT; 3	RBR; 1	SPA; 7	HUN; 7	ZAN; 8	**MNZ**; 8			4th	78

^{*}Season still in progress.
^{†}As Klein was a guest driver, he was ineligible for points.

=== Complete 24 Hours of Le Mans results ===
Year	Team	Co-Drivers	Car	Class	Laps	Pos.	Class Pos.
2022	(United Kingdom) Inception Racing	(France) Côme Ledogar (Sweden) Alexander West	Ferrari 488 GTE Evo	GTE; Am	190	DNF	DNF

=== Complete Porsche Carrera Cup Germany results ===
(key) (Races in bold indicate pole position) (Races in italics indicate fastest lap)

Year	Team	1	2	3	4	5	6	7	8	9	10	11	12	13	14	15	16	DC	Points
2024	Target Competition	IMO; 1; 4	IMO; 2; 3	OSC; 1 Ret	OSC; 2; 6	ZAN; 1; 12	ZAN; 2 DSQ	**HUN**; **1**; 1	HUN; 2; 5	NÜR; 1; 9	NÜR; 2; 6	SAC; 1	SAC; 2	RBR; 1; 11	RBR; 2; 13	HOC; 1; 7	HOC; 2 Ret	10th	113
2025	Proton Huber Competition	IMO; 1; 5	IMO; 2; 3	SPA; 1; 16	SPA; 2; 10	ZAN; 1; 11	ZAN; 2; 2	NOR; 1; 12	NOR; 2; 5	NÜR; 1; 5	NÜR; 2; 5	SAC; 1 Ret	SAC; 2; 6	RBR; 1; 9	RBR; 2 Ret	HOC; 1	HOC; 2	10th	114
