= 2022 Porsche Carrera Cup France =

Motor racing competition

The 2022 Porsche Carrera Cup France was the 36th season of the Porsche Carrera Cup France. The season began at Nogaro on 16 April and ended at Paul Ricard on 16 October. Races were held in France, Belgium, Netherlands and Spain. With seven wins from 12 races, Marvin Klein took the drivers' title; the only other race winner Dorian Boccolacci finished the season in second. Jérôme Boullery won the Pro-Am title whilst Sébastien Dussolliet triumphed in the Am class.

== Calendar ==
Round	Circuit	Date	Supporting
1	(France) Circuit Paul Armagnac	16–18 April	French GT4 Cup
2	(Belgium) Circuit de Spa-Francorchamps	5–7 May	FIA World Endurance Championship
3	(France) Circuit de Nevers Magny-Cours	13–15 May	French GT4 Cup
4	(Netherlands) Circuit Zandvoort	17–19 June	GT World Challenge Europe Sprint Cup
5	(Spain) Circuito Ricardo Tormo	16–18 September	GT World Challenge Europe Sprint Cup
6	(France) Circuit Paul Ricard	14–16 October	French GT4 Cup

== Entry list ==
Team	No.	Driver	Class	Rounds
(France) CLRT	33	(France) Evan Spenle	P	1–3
(France) CLRT	33	(Belgium) Benjamin Paque	P	5–6
(France) CLRT	44	(France) Clément Mateu	PA	All
(France) CLRT	88	(France) Ugo Gazil	P	1–3
(France) CLRT	99	(France) Marvin Klein	P	All
(France) Martinet by Alméras (Note: Cars No. 19 and 22 entered as Martinet by Alméras, whereas cars No. 23, 24, 53 and 911 entered as Pierre Martinet by Alméras.)	19	(France) Dorian Boccolacci	P	All
(France) Martinet by Alméras	22	(France) Alessandro Ghiretti	P	All
(France) Martinet by Alméras	23	(Australia) Aaron Love	P	All
(France) Martinet by Alméras	24	(France) Mathieu Martins	P R	All
(France) Martinet by Alméras	53	(France) Arthur Mathieu	P	All
(France) Martinet by Alméras	911	(France) Christophe Lapierre	PA	1–3
(France) Martinet by Alméras	911	(Spain) Rafael Villanueva Ruiz	P	5–6
(Germany) Allied-Racing	13	(Germany) Alexander Tauscher	P R	1–3
(Germany) Allied-Racing	13	(Germany) Vincent Andronaco	P	5–6
(Germany) Allied-Racing	999	(Denmark) Bastian Buus	P	1–3, 5–6
(France) TFT Racing	28	(Canada) Patrick Charlaix	Am	All
(France) TFT Racing	29	(France) Louis Perrot	P	All
(France) ABM	38	(France) Sébastien Dussolliet	Am	All
(France) ABM	73	(France) Sébastien Poisson	Am	All
(France) ABM	74	(France) Victor Blugeon	P	1–3, 5–6
(France) ABM	74	(Switzerland) Karim Ajlani	PA	4
(France) ABM	666	(France) Stéphane Louard	Am	1–4
(France) Racing Technology	7	(France) Jérôme Boullery	PA	All
(France) Racing Technology	11	(France) Sylvain Noël	PA	All
(France) Racing Technology	18	(France) Nicolas Ciamin	P	6
(France) IMSA Performance	59	(France) Maxence Martin	PA	1–3, 6
(Italy) Dinamic Motorsport	15	(Austria) Philipp Sager	PA	2, 4
(Italy) Dinamic Motorsport	16	(Italy) Simone Iaquinta	P	2, 4
(France) Porsche Lorient Racing	56	(France) Frédéric Ansel	PA	2, 4
(Ukraine) Tsunami RT	89	(United Arab Emirates) Bashar Mardini	PA	4
(Ukraine) Tsunami RT	90	(Italy) Giammarco Levorato	P	4
(Italy) Ombra Racing	32	(Italy) Gianmarco Quaresmini	P	4
(Netherlands) JW Raceservice	14	(Netherlands) Lucas van Eijndhoven	P	4, 6

Icon	Class
P	Pro Cup
R	Rookie
PA	Pro-Am Cup
Am	Am Cup

== Results ==
Round		Circuit	Pole position	Fastest lap	Overall winner	Winning team	Rookie winner	Pro-Am winner	Am winner
1	R1	(France) Nogaro	(France) Marvin Klein	(Denmark) Bastian Buus	(France) Marvin Klein	(France) CLRT	(Germany) Alexander Tauscher	(France) Jérôme Boullery	(France) Sébastien Dussolliet
1	R2	(France) Nogaro	(France) Marvin Klein	(France) Marvin Klein	(France) Marvin Klein	(France) CLRT	(France) Mathieu Martins	(France) Jérôme Boullery	(France) Sébastien Dussolliet
2	R1	(Belgium) Spa-Francorchamps	(France) Dorian Boccolacci	(France) Dorian Boccolacci	(France) Dorian Boccolacci	(France) Martinet by Alméras	(Germany) Alexander Tauscher	(France) Jérôme Boullery	(France) Sébastien Dussolliet
2	R2	(Belgium) Spa-Francorchamps	(France) Dorian Boccolacci	(France) Marvin Klein	(France) Dorian Boccolacci	(France) Martinet by Alméras	(Germany) Alexander Tauscher	(France) Jérôme Boullery	(France) Sébastien Dussolliet
3	R1	(France) Magny-Cours	(France) Marvin Klein	(France) Marvin Klein	(France) Marvin Klein	(France) CLRT	(Germany) Alexander Tauscher	(France) Jérôme Boullery	(France) Sébastien Poisson
3	R2	(France) Magny-Cours	(France) Marvin Klein	(France) Marvin Klein	(France) Marvin Klein	(France) CLRT	(Germany) Alexander Tauscher	(France) Clément Mateu	(France) Sébastien Poisson
4	R1	(Netherlands) Zandvoort	(France) Dorian Boccolacci	(France) Marvin Klein	(France) Dorian Boccolacci	(France) Martinet by Alméras	(France) Mathieu Martins	(France) Sylvian Noël	(France) Sébastien Dussolliet
4	R2	(Netherlands) Zandvoort	(France) Dorian Boccolacci	(France) Dorian Boccolacci	(France) Dorian Boccolacci	(France) Martinet by Alméras	(France) Mathieu Martins	(France) Jérôme Boullery	(France) Sébastien Dussolliet
5	R1	(Spain) Valencia	(France) Dorian Boccolacci	(France) Dorian Boccolacci	(France) Dorian Boccolacci	(France) Martinet by Alméras	(France) Mathieu Martins	(France) Jérôme Boullery	(France) Sébastien Dussolliet
5	R2	(Spain) Valencia	(France) Marvin Klein	(France) Marvin Klein	(France) Marvin Klein	(France) CLRT	(France) Mathieu Martins	(France) Jérôme Boullery	(France) Sébastien Dussolliet
6	R1	(France) Le Castellet	(France) Marvin Klein	(France) Marvin Klein	(France) Marvin Klein	(France) CLRT	(France) Mathieu Martins	(France) Sylvian Noël	(France) Sébastien Dussolliet
6	R2	(France) Le Castellet	(France) Marvin Klein	(France) Dorian Boccolacci	(France) Marvin Klein	(France) CLRT	(France) Mathieu Martins	(France) Jérôme Boullery	(France) Sébastien Dussolliet

== Standings ==
Points are awarded according to the following structure:

Position	1st	2nd	3rd	4th	5th	6th	7th	8th	9th	10th	11th	12th	13th	14th	15th	Pole	F/Lap
Points	25	20	17	14	12	10	9	8	7	6	5	4	3	2	1	1	1

=== Overall ===
Pos.	Driver	NOG (France)		SPA (Belgium)		MAG (France)		ZAN (Netherlands)		VAL (Spain)		LEC (France)		Points
Pos.	Driver	R1	R2	R1	R2	R1	R2	R1	R2	R1	R2	R1	R2	Points
1	(France) Marvin Klein	1	1	2	2	1	1	19	2	2	1	1	1	271
2	(France) Dorian Boccolacci	3	Ret	1	1	4	2	1	1	1	2	2	2	245
3	(France) Alessandro Ghiretti	2	2	9	7	2	5	2	Ret	4	Ret	3	Ret	139
4	(Denmark) Bastian Buus	19	6	3	6	3	3			3	4	4	3	137
5	(Australia) Aaron Love	6	DSQ	Ret	8	10	4	7	5	5	6	5	8	114
6	(France) Mathieu Martins	10	5	10	12	7	11	9	8	10	15	9	4	101
7	(France) Louis Perrot	Ret	Ret	5	3	14	6	17	4	7	7	6	Ret	94
8	(France) Jérôme Boullery	8	8	7	9	9	13	12	11	11	13	12	9	87
9	(France) Victor Blugeon	9	4	6	4	Ret	DNS			9	9	13	5	80
10	(France) Arthur Mathieu	12	13	11	11	8	Ret	6	10	13	8	14	10	79
11	(France) Evan Spenle	5	3	4	5	5	7							76
12	(France) Sylvain Noël	13	10	13	15	11	10	10	13	17	14	10	13	61
13	(Germany) Alexander Tauscher	4	7	8	10	6	8							55
14	(France) Sébastien Dussolliet	16	12	15	14	Ret	DNS	11	12	15	10	11	11	50
15	(France) Clément Mateu	15	11	19	17	13	9	13	14	12	18	21	Ret	38
16	(France) Sébastien Poisson	17	15	17	19	12	12	14	16	16	12	20	Ret	32
17	(France) Maxence Maurice	14	14	14	13	Ret	DNS					18	12	18
18	(Canada) Patrick Charlaix	20	16	21	Ret	16	15	18	19	19	17	23	18	15
19	(France) Ugo Gazil	7	Ret	12	18	Ret	DNS							13
20	(France) Christophe Lapierre	11	9	16	16	Ret	DNS							12
21	(Syria) Karim Ajlani							16	18					9
22	(France) Stéphane Louard	18	DNS	20	22	15	14	20	20					6
Guest drivers ineligible to score points
—	(Italy) Simone Iaquinta			22	20			3	3					
—	(Germany) Vincent Andronaco									6	3	8	14	
—	(Italy) Giammarco Levorato							4	6					
—	(Italy) Gianmarco Quaresmini							5	7					
—	(Belgium) Benjamin Paque									8	5	7	7	
–	(France) Nicolas Ciamin											15	6	
—	(Netherlands) Lucas van Eijndhoven							8	9			17	16	
—	(Spain) Rafael Villanueva Ruiz									14	11	16	17	
—	(Austria) Philipp Sager			18	21			15	17					
–	(United Arab Emirates) Bashar Mardini							Ret	15					
–	(France) Frédéric Ansel											19	15	
Pos.	Driver	R1	R2	R1	R2	R1	R2	R1	R2	R1	R2	R1	R2	Points
Pos.	Driver	NOG (France)		SPA (Belgium)		MAG (France)		ZAN (Netherlands)		VAL (Spain)		LEC (France)		Points

=== Rookie ===
Pos.	Driver	NOG (France)		SPA (Belgium)		MAG (France)		ZAN (Netherlands)		VAL (Spain)		LEC (France)		Points
Pos.	Driver	R1	R2	R1	R2	R1	R2	R1	R2	R1	R2	R1	R2	Points
1	(France) Mathieu Martins	2	1	2	2	2	2	1	1	1	1	1	1	292
2	(Germany) Alexander Tauscher	1	2	1	1	1	1							151
Pos.	Driver	R1	R2	R1	R2	R1	R2	R1	R2	R1	R2	R1	R2	Points
Pos.	Driver	NOG (France)		SPA (Belgium)		MAG (France)		ZAN (Netherlands)		VAL (Spain)		LEC (France)		Points

=== Pro-Am ===
Pos.	Driver	NOG (France)		SPA (Belgium)		MAG (France)		ZAN (Netherlands)		VAL (Spain)		LEC (France)		Points
Pos.	Driver	R1	R2	R1	R2	R1	R2	R1	R2	R1	R2	R1	R2	Points
1	(France) Jérôme Boullery	1	1	1	1	1	3	2	1*	1*	1	2	1	261
2	(France) Sylvain Noël	3	3	2	3	2	2	1	2*	3	2	1	3	204
3	(France) Clément Mateu	5	4	6	5	3	1	3	3	2*	3	5	Ret	168
4	(France) Maxence Maurice	4	5	3	2	Ret	DNS					3	2	102
5	(France) Christophe Lapierre	2	2	4	4	Ret	DNS							68
6	(Syria) Karim Ajlani							5	6					28
Guest drivers ineligible to score points
–	(France) Frédéric Ansel											4	4	–
–	(Austria) Philipp Sager			5	6			4	5					–
–	(United Arab Emirates) Bashar Mardini							Ret	4					–
Pos.	Driver	R1	R2	R1	R2	R1	R2	R1	R2	R1	R2	R1	R2	Points
Pos.	Driver	NOG (France)		SPA (Belgium)		MAG (France)		ZAN (Netherlands)		VAL (Spain)		LEC (France)		Points

=== Am ===
Pos.	Driver	NOG (France)		SPA (Belgium)		MAG (France)		ZAN (Netherlands)		VAL (Spain)		LEC (France)		Points
Pos.	Driver	R1	R2	R1	R2	R1	R2	R1	R2	R1	R2	R1	R2	Points
1	(France) Sébastien Dussolliet	1	1	1	1	Ret	DNS	1	1	1	1	1*	1	268
2	(France) Sébastien Poisson	2	2	2	2	1	1	2	2	2	2	2*	Ret	216
3	(Canada) Patrick Charlaix	4	3	4	Ret	3	3	3	3	3	3	3	2	170
4	(France) Stéphane Louard	3	DNS	3	3	2	2	4	4					119
Pos.	Driver	R1	R2	R1	R2	R1	R2	R1	R2	R1	R2	R1	R2	Points
Pos.	Driver	NOG (France)		SPA (Belgium)		MAG (France)		ZAN (Netherlands)		VAL (Spain)		LEC (France)		Points
