= 2023 Porsche Carrera Cup France =

Motor racing competition

The 2023 Porsche Carrera Cup France was the 37th season of the Porsche Carrera Cup France. The season began at Circuit de Barcelona-Catalunya on 22 April and ended at Circuit Paul Ricard on 8 October. Forestier Racing CLRT driver Dorian Boccolacci won the drivers' title, beating Martinet by Alméras driver Alessandro Ghiretti by 24 points.

== Calendar ==
Round	Circuit	Date	Map of circuit locations
1	Circuit de Barcelona-Catalunya, Montmeló, Spain	21–23 April	2023 Porsche Carrera Cup France is located in Europe
2	Circuit de Nevers Magny-Cours, Magny-Cours, France	5–7 May	2023 Porsche Carrera Cup France is located in Europe
3	Circuit de la Sarthe, Le Mans, France	9–10 June	2023 Porsche Carrera Cup France is located in Europe
4	Red Bull Ring, Spielberg, Austria	8–10 September	2023 Porsche Carrera Cup France is located in Europe
5	Monza Circuit, Monza, Italy	22–24 September	2023 Porsche Carrera Cup France is located in Europe
6	Circuit Paul Ricard, Le Castellet, France	6–8 October	2023 Porsche Carrera Cup France is located in Europe

== Results ==
Round		Circuit	Pole position	Fastest lap	Overall winner	Winning team	Pro-Am winner	Am winner	Rookie winner
1	R1	(Spain) Circuit de Barcelona-Catalunya	(France) Marvin Klein	(Belgium) Benjamin Paque	(France) Alessandro Ghiretti	(France) Martinet by Alméras	(Kuwait) Bashar Mardini	(France) Gilles Colombani	(Belgium) Benjamin Paque
1	R2	(Spain) Circuit de Barcelona-Catalunya	(France) Alessandro Ghiretti	(France) Marvin Klein	(France) Alessandro Ghiretti	(France) Martinet by Alméras	(France) Jérôme Boullery	(France) Sébastien Poisson	(Belgium) Benjamin Paque
2	R1	(France) Circuit de Nevers Magny-Cours	(France) Dorian Boccolacci	(France) Marvin Klein	(France) Dorian Boccolacci	(France) Forestier Racing CLRT	(France) Marc Guillot	(France) Sébastien Poisson	(Belgium) Benjamin Paque
2	R2	(France) Circuit de Nevers Magny-Cours	(France) Dorian Boccolacci	(France) Alessandro Ghiretti	(France) Marvin Klein	(France) TFT Racing	(France) Christophe Lapierre	(France) Ludovic Loeul	(France) Mathys Jaubert
3	R1	(France) Circuit de la Sarthe	(France) Dorian Boccolacci	(France) Alessandro Ghiretti	(France) Marvin Klein	(France) TFT Racing	(France) Christophe Lapierre	(France) Ludovic Loeul	(France) Mathys Jaubert
4	R1	(Austria) Red Bull Racing	(France) Marvin Klein	(France) Marvin Klein	(France) Marvin Klein	(France) TFT Racing	(France) Jérôme Boullery	(France) Sébastien Poisson	(Belgium) Benjamin Paque
4	R2	(Austria) Red Bull Racing	(France) Marvin Klein	(France) Dorian Boccolacci	(France) Marvin Klein	(France) TFT Racing	(France) Marc Guillot	(France) Sébastien Poisson	(Belgium) Benjamin Paque
5	R1	(Italy) Monza Circuit	(France) Dorian Boccolacci	(France) Dorian Boccolacci	(France) Dorian Boccolacci	(France) Forestier Racing CLRT	(France) Marc Guillot	(France) Sébastien Poisson	(Belgium) Benjamin Paque
5	R2	(Italy) Monza Circuit	(France) Dorian Boccolacci	(France) Dorian Boccolacci	(France) Dorian Boccolacci	(France) Forestier Racing CLRT	(France) Jérôme Boullery	(France) Sébastien Poisson	(France) Mathys Jaubert
6	R1	(France) Circuit Paul Ricard	(France) Dorian Boccolacci	(France) Dorian Boccolacci	(France) Dorian Boccolacci	(France) Forestier Racing CLRT	(France) Sébastien Dussolliet	(France) Sébastien Poisson	(Belgium) Benjamin Paque
6	R2	(France) Circuit Paul Ricard	(France) Dorian Boccolacci	(France) Dorian Boccolacci	(France) Dorian Boccolacci	(France) Forestier Racing CLRT	(France) Jérôme Boullery	(France) Sébastien Poisson	(France) Mathys Jaubert

== Championship standings ==
=== Scoring system ===
Position	1st	2nd	3rd	4th	5th	6th	7th	8th	9th	10th	11th	12th	13th	14th	15th	Pole	FL
Points	25	20	17	14	12	10	9	8	7	6	5	4	3	2	1	1	1

=== Overall ===
Pos.	Driver	Team	(Spain) BAR		(France) MAG		(France) LMS	(Austria) RBR		(Italy) MNZ		(France) LEC		Points
1	(France) Dorian Boccolacci	(France) Forestier Racing CLRT	2	3	1	6	2	2	4	1	1	1	1	239
2	(France) Alessandro Ghiretti	(France) Martinet by Alméras	1	1	2	2	3	3	2	2	2	2	8	215
3	(France) Marvin Klein	(France) TFT Racing	19	4	6	1	1	1	1	4	5	5	3	184
4	(France) Mathys Jaubert	(France) TFT Racing	4	6	4	3	4	6	8	Ret	4	4	2	136
5	(Belgium) Benjamin Paque	(France) Forestier Racing CLRT	3	2	3	Ret	26	5	7	3	15	3	4	127
6	(France) Jérémy Sarhy	(France) Racing Technology	7	7	8	5	7	4	5	7	7	8	7	109
7	(France) Louis Perrot	(France) IMSA LS Group Performance	5	8	5	4	Ret	15	3	12	3	6	5	108
8	(France) Louis Rousset	(France) Forestier Racing CLRT	6	5	16	9	5	8	12	5	22	7	6	85
9	(France) Marlon Hernandez	(France) ABM	8	17	7	7	Ret	7	10	6	6	11	11	72
10	(France) Victor Blugeon	(France) ABM	21	14	12	10	12	13	9	10	11	9	9	56
11	(France) Jérôme Boullery	(France) Racing Technology	10	9	10	Ret	13	9	13	11	9	15	10	56
12	(France) Marc Guillot	(France) Herrero Racing	11	11	9	15	40	10	11	8	10	14	12	50
13	(France) Sébastien Dussolliet	(France) ABM	13	13	14	13	16	11	16	13	12	10	13	38
14	(France) Arthur Mathieu	(France) Martinet by Alméras	12	10	13	8	39	Ret	15	Ret	8	12	14	37
15	(Kuwait) Bashar Mardini	(Ukraine) Tsunami RT	9	12	20	14	19	12	18	9	20			27
16	(France) Christophe Lapierre	(France) Martinet by Alméras	Ret	15	NC	11	10	19	14	17	18	16	15	19
17	(France) Maxence Maurice	(France) IMSA LS Group Performance	Ret	16	11	17	11	18	17	20	14	19	18	14
18	(France) Frédéric Ancel	(France) Porsche Lorient Racing	14	19	19	12	38	23	21	18	Ret	13	16	9
19	(France) Ludovic Loeul	(France) Porsche Lorient Racing	Ret	Ret	17	16	17	21	23	16	17	18	19	5
20	(France) Sébastien Poisson	(France) ABM	Ret	18	15	21	36	17	19	15	16	17	17	5
21	(France) Gilles Colombani	(France) Team Clairet Sport	16	21	21	22	23	26	Ret	21	Ret	21	Ret	3
22	(Syria) Karim Ajlani	(France) ABM	20	28	23	20	24	20	22	Ret	Ret	20	21	1
23	(Belgium) Alexandre Leroy	(France) TFT Racing	25	22	18	18	29	22	24	19	21	24	22	0
24	(Switzerland) Christian Jaquillard	(France) Racing Technology	22	23	22	19	33	25	25	22	23	23	Ret	0
25	(United States) Dominique Bastien	(France) Speed Lover	24	27	25	24	30	27	Ret	24	24	25	23	0
26	(France) Mathieu Casalonga	(France) F4 Events Motorsport	18	25	26	23	31							0
27	(Australia) Marc Cini	(France) Martinet by Alméras	23	26	24	25	34							0
Pos.	Driver	Team	(Spain) BAR		(France) MAG		(France) LMS	(Austria) RBR		(Italy) MNZ		(France) LEC		Points

=== Pro-Am ===
Pos.	Driver	Team	(Spain) BAR		(France) MAG		(France) LMS	(Austria) RBR		(Italy) MNZ		(France) LEC		Points
1	(France) Jérôme Boullery	(France) Racing Technology	10	9	10	Ret	13	9	13	11	9	15	10	205
2	(France) Marc Guillot	(France) Herrero Racing	11	11	9	15	40	10	11	8	10	14	12	200
3	(France) Sébastien Dussolliet	(France) ABM	13	13	14	13	16	11	16	13	12	10	13	150
4	(France) Christophe Lapierre	(France) Martinet by Alméras	Ret	15	NC	11	10	19	14	17	18	16	15	129
5	(France) Frédéric Ancel	(France) Porsche Lorient Racing	14	19	19	12	38	23	21	18	Ret	13	16	114
6	(Kuwait) Bashar Mardini	(Ukraine) Tsunami RT	9	12	20	14	19	12	18	9	20			113
7	(France) Maxence Maurice	(France) IMSA LS Group Performance	Ret	16	11	17	11	18	17	20	14	19	18	113
Pos.	Driver	Team	(Spain) BAR		(France) MAG		(France) LMS	(Austria) RBR		(Italy) MNZ		(France) LEC		Points

=== Am ===
Pos.	Driver	Team	(Spain) BAR		(France) MAG		(France) LMS	(Austria) RBR		(Italy) MNZ		(France) LEC		Points
1	(France) Sébastien Poisson	(France) ABM	Ret	18	15	21	36	17	19	15	16	17	17	227
2	(France) Ludovic Loeul	(France) Porsche Lorient Racing	Ret	Ret	17	16	17	21	23	16	17	18	19	191
3	(Belgium) Alexandre Leroy	(France) TFT Racing	25	22	18	18	29	22	24	19	21	24	22	144
4	(Syria) Karim Ajlani	(France) ABM	20	28	23	20	24	20	22	Ret	Ret	20	21	139
5	(France) Gilles Colombani	(France) Team Clairet Sport	16	21	21	22	23	26	Ret	21	Ret	21	Ret	127
6	(Switzerland) Christian Jaquillard	(France) Racing Technology	22	23	22	19	33	25	25	22	23	23	Ret	119
7	(United States) Dominique Bastien	(France) Speed Lover	24	27	25	24	30	27	Ret	24	24	25	23	91
8	(France) Mathieu Casalonga	(France) F4 Events Motorsport	18	25	26	23	31							41
9	(Australia) Marc Cini	(France) Martinet by Alméras	23	26	24	25	34							31
Pos.	Driver	Team	(Spain) BAR		(France) MAG		(France) LMS	(Austria) RBR		(Italy) MNZ		(France) LEC		Points

=== Rookie ===
Pos.	Driver	Team	(Spain) BAR		(France) MAG		(France) LMS	(Austria) RBR		(Italy) MNZ		(France) LEC		Points
1	(Belgium) Benjamin Paque	(France) Forestier Racing CLRT	3	2	3	Ret	26	5	7	3	15	3	4	143
2	(France) Mathys Jaubert	(France) TFT Racing	4	6	4	3	4	6	8	Ret	4	4	2	141
3	(France) Louis Rousset	(France) Forestier Racing CLRT	6	5	16	9	5	8	12	5	22	7	6	85
4	(France) Marlon Hernandez	(France) ABM	8	17	7	7	Ret	7	10	6	6	11	11	72
Pos.	Driver	Team	(Spain) BAR		(France) MAG		(France) LMS	(Austria) RBR		(Italy) MNZ		(France) LEC		Points
