= 2014 French F4 Championship =

French motorsport season

Seasons
- ← 2013 2015 →

The 2014 French F4 Championship season was the 22nd season of the series for 1600cc Formula Renault machinery, and the fourth season to run under the guise of the French F4 Championship. The series began on 26 April at Le Mans and ended on 26 October at Le Castellet, after seven rounds and twenty-one races.

The championship was won by Denmark's Lasse Sørensen, who won eight races – including two hat-tricks at Val de Vienne and Nogaro – and took a total of seventeen podium finishes. Sørensen – who also won the International series due to his performances – finished almost 150 points clear of his next closest rival, Dorian Boccolacci, a member of the Lotus F1 team's junior development setup. Boccolacci, who won two races at the series' event in support of the Pau Grand Prix, had trailed Felix Hirsiger by three points going into the final race at Le Castellet; however, Boccolacci finished third, whereas Hirsiger finished outside the points, in order to give Boccolacci the runner-up spot by twelve points. Boccolacci was also the winner of the junior championship held within the series, for the younger drivers in the series. Hirsiger was also a two-time winner, winning at Magny-Cours.

Six other drivers won races during the season; Australian Joseph Mawson won two races at the opening round at Le Mans, and added a third victory in the series' round at Circuito de Jerez, in support of the World Series by Renault. Mawson had been in contention for the runner-up placing in the championship, but missed the final round and ultimately finished fourth. Denis Bulatov won races at Pau and Magny-Cours, and was the only other driver to win multiple races. Bryan Elpitiya (Le Mans) and Gjergj Haxhiu (Jerez) each won a race, but finished outside the top ten in the final championship standings, while at the final round, Patricio O'Ward and Valentin Moineault each won races. Moineault's victory allowed him to claim sixth in the championship ahead of O'Ward, despite O'Ward missing the first two events of the season.

== Driver lineup ==
No.	Driver	Rounds
1	(Switzerland) Paul Hökfelt, Jr.	All
2	(France) Amaury Richard	All
3	(Sweden) Reuben Kressner	All
4	(Switzerland) David Droux	1–6
5	(France) Bryan Elpitiya	All
6	(United Kingdom) Felix Hirsiger	All
7	(France) Valentin Hasse-Clot	All
8	(France) Tom Soubiron	1–5, 7
9	(France) Dorian Boccolacci	All
10	(Russia) Vladimir Atoev	All
11	(France) Erwan Jule	All
12	(France) Hugo Sugnot-Darniche	All
14	(Finland) Simo Laaksonen	All
15	(Russia) Denis Bulatov	All
16	(France) Valentin Moineault	All
17	(Albania) Gjergj Haxhiu	All
18	(Finland) Niclas Nylund	1–6
19	(Colombia) Juan Manuel Jimenez	1–3
20	(Mexico) Axel Matus	All
21	(Australia) Joey Mawson	1–6
22	(France) Anouck Abadie	All
23	(Denmark) Lasse Sørensen	All
24	(Portugal) João Carvalho	All
25	(Mexico) Pato O'Ward	3–7
26	(Belgium) Max Defourny (Note: Guest driver ineligible for any championship points.)	4–5, 7
27	(United Kingdom) Harrison Newey	7

== Race calendar and results ==
Round		Circuit	Date	Pole position	Fastest lap	Winning driver	Junior winner	International winner
1	R1	(France) Bugatti Circuit, Le Mans	26 April	(Australia) Joseph Mawson	(United Kingdom) Felix Hirsiger	(Australia) Joseph Mawson	(France) Dorian Boccolacci	(Australia) Joseph Mawson
1	R2	(France) Bugatti Circuit, Le Mans	26 April		(Australia) Joseph Mawson	(France) Bryan Elpitiya	(France) Bryan Elpitiya	(Australia) Joseph Mawson
1	R3	(France) Bugatti Circuit, Le Mans	27 April	(United Kingdom) Felix Hirsiger	(Russia) Denis Bulatov	(Australia) Joseph Mawson	(United Kingdom) Felix Hirsiger	(Australia) Joseph Mawson
2	R1	(France) Circuit de Pau, Pau	10 May	(France) Dorian Boccolacci	(France) Dorian Boccolacci	(France) Dorian Boccolacci	(France) Dorian Boccolacci	(Denmark) Lasse Sørensen
2	R2	(France) Circuit de Pau, Pau	10 May		(Switzerland) David Droux	(Russia) Denis Bulatov	(Russia) Denis Bulatov	(France) Valentin Moineault
2	R3	(France) Circuit de Pau, Pau	11 May	(France) Dorian Boccolacci	(Denmark) Lasse Sørensen	(France) Dorian Boccolacci	(France) Dorian Boccolacci	(Denmark) Lasse Sørensen
3	R1	(France) Circuit du Val de Vienne, Le Vigeant	5 July	(Denmark) Lasse Sørensen	(Denmark) Lasse Sørensen	(Denmark) Lasse Sørensen	(United Kingdom) Felix Hirsiger	(Denmark) Lasse Sørensen
3	R2	(France) Circuit du Val de Vienne, Le Vigeant	5 July		(Denmark) Lasse Sørensen	(Denmark) Lasse Sørensen	(Russia) Denis Bulatov	(Denmark) Lasse Sørensen
3	R3	(France) Circuit du Val de Vienne, Le Vigeant	6 July	(Denmark) Lasse Sørensen	(Denmark) Lasse Sørensen	(Denmark) Lasse Sørensen	(France) Dorian Boccolacci	(Denmark) Lasse Sørensen
4	R1	(France) Circuit de Nevers Magny-Cours	6 September	(United Kingdom) Felix Hirsiger	(Denmark) Lasse Sørensen	(United Kingdom) Felix Hirsiger	(United Kingdom) Felix Hirsiger	(Denmark) Lasse Sørensen
4	R2	(France) Circuit de Nevers Magny-Cours	6 September		(Australia) Joseph Mawson	(Russia) Denis Bulatov	(Russia) Denis Bulatov	(France) Valentin Hasse-Clot
4	R3	(France) Circuit de Nevers Magny-Cours	7 September	(United Kingdom) Felix Hirsiger	(France) Valentin Hasse-Clot	(United Kingdom) Felix Hirsiger	(United Kingdom) Felix Hirsiger	(Australia) Joseph Mawson
5	R1	(France) Circuit Paul Armagnac, Nogaro	27 September	(Denmark) Lasse Sørensen	(Denmark) Lasse Sørensen	(Denmark) Lasse Sørensen	(France) Dorian Boccolacci	(Denmark) Lasse Sørensen
5	R2	(France) Circuit Paul Armagnac, Nogaro	27 September		(Denmark) Lasse Sørensen	(Denmark) Lasse Sørensen	(United Kingdom) Felix Hirsiger	(Denmark) Lasse Sørensen
5	R3	(France) Circuit Paul Armagnac, Nogaro	28 September	(Denmark) Lasse Sørensen	(France) Dorian Boccolacci	(Denmark) Lasse Sørensen	(France) Dorian Boccolacci	(Denmark) Lasse Sørensen
6	R1	(Spain) Circuito de Jerez, Jerez de la Frontera	18 October	(Australia) Joseph Mawson	(Australia) Joseph Mawson	(Australia) Joseph Mawson	(Mexico) Patricio O'Ward	(Australia) Joseph Mawson
6	R2	(Spain) Circuito de Jerez, Jerez de la Frontera	19 October		(Russia) Vladimir Atoev	(Switzerland) (Albania) Gjergj Haxhiu	(Switzerland) (Albania) Gjergj Haxhiu	(Switzerland) David Droux
6	R3	(Spain) Circuito de Jerez, Jerez de la Frontera	19 October	(Australia) Joseph Mawson	(Denmark) Lasse Sørensen	(Denmark) Lasse Sørensen	(Mexico) Patricio O'Ward	(Denmark) Lasse Sørensen
7	R1	(France) Circuit Paul Ricard, Le Castellet	25 October	(Denmark) Lasse Sørensen	(United Kingdom) Felix Hirsiger	(Denmark) Lasse Sørensen	(United Kingdom) Felix Hirsiger	(Denmark) Lasse Sørensen
7	R2	(France) Circuit Paul Ricard, Le Castellet	25 October		(Denmark) Lasse Sørensen	(Mexico) Patricio O'Ward	(Mexico) Patricio O'Ward	(Denmark) Lasse Sørensen
7	R3	(France) Circuit Paul Ricard, Le Castellet	26 October	(France) Valentin Moineault	(France) Dorian Boccolacci	(France) Valentin Moineault	(France) Dorian Boccolacci	(France) Valentin Moineault

== Championship standings ==
=== F4 ===
Pos	Driver	LMS (France)			PAU (France)			VDV (France)			MAG (France)			NOG (France)			JER (Spain)			LEC (France)			Points
1	(Denmark) Lasse Sørensen	2	22†	2	2	8	2	**1**	1	**1**	2	8	3	**1**	1	**1**	2	7	1	**1**	2	2	387
2	(France) Dorian Boccolacci	3	5	4	**1**	9	**1**	7	4	2	3	Ret	12	2	4	2	4	6	20	5	Ret	3	238
3	(United Kingdom) Felix Hirsiger	6	2	**3**	3	7	3	2	Ret	19	**1**	6	**1**	3	2	3	12	9	13	2	DNS	20	226
4	(Australia) Joey Mawson	**1**	3	1	DSQ	17	20†	6	3	Ret	4	3	2	9	16	8	**1**	16	**2**				188
5	(Russia) Denis Bulatov	18	10	6	8	1	Ret	5	2	7	9	1	7	6	13	6	6	5	12	6	5	6	168
6	(France) Valentin Moineault	16	Ret	DNS	5	3	16	12	8	3	14	10	8	7	5	11	5	4	3	4	7	**1**	150
7	(Mexico) Patricio O'Ward							4	5	5	5	Ret	11	4	6	5	3	8	5	7	1	5	143
8	(Switzerland) Paul Hökfelt, Jr.	7	4	7	Ret	Ret	Ret	3	Ret	6	11	5	5	11	10	9	9	14	8	8	6	4	103
9	(France) Amaury Richard	4	16	5	6	5	5	9	17	4	17	Ret	16	13	Ret	19	13	20	17	3	8	18	85
10	(France) Valentin Hasse-Clot	13	6	9	Ret	10	Ret	10	Ret	9	7	2	4	5	3	7	11	10	14	Ret	15	Ret	83
11	(Russia) Vladimir Atoev	5	9	20	Ret	11	6	11	7	8	8	12	18	8	19	4	15	11	9	9	4	10	71
12	(Switzerland) David Droux	15	13	12	4	6	12	20†	10	Ret	6	7	6	15	11	15	7	2	10				69
13	(France) Bryan Elpitiya	10	1	8	Ret	14	Ret	8	6	12	Ret	11	Ret	16	8	22	14	17	7	17	EX	EX	53
14	(France) Erwan Jule	8	21†	11	7	4	4	13	12	11	10	4	9	19	14	14	Ret	21	DNS	13	10	11	52
15	(Finland) Niclas Nylund	14	11	10	11	20†	7	Ret	14	17	Ret	13	13	12	7	12	8	3	4				44
16	(Albania) Gjergj Haxhiu	11	12	13	Ret	Ret	10	18	11	10	13	Ret	15	21	22†	16	10	1	6	Ret	Ret	8	40
17	(Finland) Simo Laaksonen	12	8	14	9	2	11	15	9	13	20	19†	19	17	12	18	16	22	16	11	9	13	31
18	(Sweden) Reuben Kressner	9	7	15	16†	16	8	Ret	15	Ret	Ret	18	14	14	9	13	Ret	19	11	12	Ret	7	20
19	(Portugal) João Carvalho	21	18	19	10	19	9	16	Ret	Ret	16	15	21	22	Ret	Ret	19	13	18	16	12	16	3
20	(United Kingdom) Harrison Newey																			18	16	9	2
21	(Mexico) Axel Matus	19	15	18	12	15	15	17	16	16	18	14	17	18	15	17	17	18	15	15	11	15	1
22	(France) Tom Soubiron	17	17	17	13	12	14	14	13	14	15	16	20	20	17	20				14	14	14	0
23	(France) Hugo Sugnot-Darniche	22	19	21	14	18	Ret	Ret	19	15	19	17	22	23	18	21	18	12	21	Ret	13	17	0
24	(Colombia) Juan Manuel Jimenez	20	14	16	17†	13	13	Ret	18	18													0
25	(France) Anouck Abadie	Ret	20	22	15	21	17	19	20	Ret	21	Ret	23	24	20	23	20	15	19	19	17	19	0
Guest drivers ineligible for points
—	(Belgium) Max Defourny										12	9	10	10	21†	10				10	3	12	
Pos	Driver	LMS (France)			PAU (France)			VDV (France)			MAG (France)			NOG (France)			JER (Spain)			LEC (France)			Points

Colour	Result
Gold	Winner
Silver	Second place
Bronze	Third place
Green	Points classification
Blue	Non-points classification
Blue	Non-classified finish (NC)
Purple	Retired, not classified (Ret)
Red	Did not qualify (DNQ)
Red	Did not pre-qualify (DNPQ)
Black	Disqualified (DSQ)
White	Did not start (DNS)
White	Withdrew (WD)
White	Race cancelled (C)
Blank	Did not practice (DNP)
Blank	Did not arrive (DNA)
Blank	Excluded (EX)

**Bold** – Pole
Italics – Fastest Lap

† — Drivers did not finish the race, but were classified as they completed over 75% of the race distance.

=== Junior ===
Pos	Driver	LMS (France)			PAU (France)			VDV (France)			MAG (France)			NOG (France)			JER (Spain)			LEC (France)			Points
1	(France) Dorian Boccolacci	3	5	4	1	9	1	7	4	2	3	Ret	12	2	4	2	4	6	20	5	Ret	3	327
2	(United Kingdom) Felix Hirsiger	6	2	3	3	7	3	2	Ret	19	1	6	1	3	2	3	12	9	13	2	DNS	20	292
3	(Russia) Denis Bulatov	18	10	6	8	1	Ret	5	2	7	9	1	7	6	13	6	6	5	12	6	5	6	249
4	(Mexico) Patricio O'Ward							4	5	5	5	Ret	11	4	6	5	3	8	5	7	1	5	194
5	(Switzerland) Paul Hökfelt, Jr.	7	4	7	Ret	Ret	Ret	3	Ret	6	11	5	5	11	10	9	9	14	8	8	6	4	194
6	(Russia) Vladimir Atoev	5	9	20	Ret	11	6	11	7	8	8	12	18	8	19	4	15	11	9	9	4	10	166
7	(Finland) Simo Laaksonen	12	8	14	9	2	11	15	9	13	20	19†	19	17	12	18	16	22	16	11	9	13	117
8	(France) Bryan Elpitiya	10	1	8	Ret	14	Ret	8	6	12	Ret	11	Ret	16	8	22	14	17	7	17	EX	EX	115
9	(Albania) Gjergj Haxhiu	11	12	13	Ret	Ret	10	18	11	10	13	Ret	15	21	22†	16	10	1	6	Ret	Ret	8	88
10	(Mexico) Axel Matus	19	15	18	12	15	15	17	16	16	18	14	17	18	15	17	17	18	15	15	11	15	75
11	(France) Hugo Sugnot-Darniche	22	19	21	14	18	Ret	Ret	19	15	19	17	22	23	18	21	18	12	21	Ret	13	17	31
12	(Colombia) Juan Manuel Jimenez	20	14	16	17†	13	13	Ret	18	18													31
13	(United Kingdom) Harrison Newey																			18	16	9	13
Guest drivers ineligible for points
	(Belgium) Max Defourny										12	9	10	10	21†	10				10	3	12	
Pos	Driver	LMS (France)			PAU (France)			VDV (France)			MAG (France)			NOG (France)			JER (Spain)			LEC (France)			Points

=== International series ===
Pos	Driver	LMS (France)			PAU (France)			VDV (France)			MAG (France)			NOG (France)			JER (Spain)			LEC (France)			Points
1	(Denmark) Lasse Sørensen	2	22†	2	2	8	2	1	1	1	2	8	3	1	1	1	2	7	1	1	2	2	385
2	(Australia) Joseph Mawson	1	3	1	DSQ	17	20†	6	3	Ret	4	3	2	9	16	8	1	16	2				230
3	(France) Valentin Moineault	16	Ret	DNS	5	3	16	12	8	3	14	10	8	7	5	11	5	4	3	4	7	1	228
4	(France) Valentin Hasse-Clot	13	6	9	Ret	10	Ret	10	Ret	9	7	2	4	5	3	7	11	10	14	Ret	15	Ret	190
5	(France) Erwan Jule	8	21†	11	7	4	4	13	12	11	10	4	9	19	14	14	Ret	21	DNS	13	10	11	175
6	(France) Amaury Richard	4	16	5	6	5	5	9	17	4	17	Ret	16	13	Ret	19	13	20	17	3	8	18	171
7	(Switzerland) David Droux	15	13	12	4	6	12	20†	10	Ret	6	7	6	15	11	15	7	2	10				135
8	(Finland) Niclas Nylund	14	11	10	11	20†	7	Ret	14	17	Ret	13	13	12	7	12	8	3	4				112
9	(Sweden) Reuben Kressner	9	7	15	16†	16	8	Ret	15	Ret	Ret	18	14	14	9	13	Ret	19	11	12	Ret	7	105
10	(France) Tom Soubiron	17	17	17	13	12	14	14	13	14	15	16	20	20	17	20				14	14	14	84
11	(Portugal) João Carvalho	21	18	19	10	19	9	16	Ret	Ret	16	15	21	22	Ret	Ret	19	13	18	16	12	16	62
12	(France) Anouck Abadie	Ret	20	22	15	21	17	19	20	Ret	21	Ret	23	24	20	23	20	15	19	19	17	19	20
Pos	Driver	LMS (France)			PAU (France)			VDV (France)			MAG (France)			NOG (France)			JER (Spain)			LEC (France)			Points
