= 2021 Porsche Carrera Cup France =

Motor racing competition

The 2021 Porsche Carrera Cup France was the 35th season of the Porsche Carrera Cup France. The season began at Magny-Cours on 7 May and ended at Portimao on 24 October. Races were held in France, Belgium, Italy, Spain and Portugal. This was the first season that the new Porsche 911 GT3 Cup (Type 992) was used by all competitors.

== Calendar ==
Round	Circuit	Date	Supporting
1	(France) Circuit de Nevers Magny-Cours	6–8 May	2021 GT World Challenge Europe Sprint Cup
2	(France) Circuit Paul Ricard	14–16 May	2021 International GT Open
3	(Belgium) Circuit de Spa-Francorchamps	18–20 June	2021 International GT Open
4	(Italy) Autodromo Nazionale di Monza	9–11 July	2021 European Le Mans Series
5	(Spain) Circuit de Barcelona-Catalunya	8–10 October	2021 GT World Challenge Europe Endurance Cup
6	(Portugal) Autodromo Internacional do Algarve	22–24 October	2021 European Le Mans Series

== Entry list ==
Team	No.	Driver	Class	Rounds
(Austria) BWT Lechner Racing	1	(France) Jean-Baptiste Simmenauer	P	All
(Austria) BWT Lechner Racing	2	(Luxembourg) Dylan Pereira	P	1
(Austria) BWT Lechner Racing	55	(Monaco) Nicolas Misslin	PA	All
(Austria) BWT Lechner Racing	87	(Germany) Richard Wagner	P	1–2, 5–6
(Austria) BWT Lechner Racing	87	(Luxembourg) Dylan Pereira	P	3
(France) ABM	3	(France) Milan Petelet	R	1–3
(France) ABM	73	(France) Sébastien Dussolliet	Am	4, 6
(France) ABM	73	(France) Sebastian Poisson	Am	5
(France) ABM	74	(France) Victor Blugeon	P	All
(France) / CLRT (Note: Cars No. 11, 44, 77 and 99 entered as CLRT and cars No. 3, 15, 33, 88 and 888 entered as MRT by CLRT); (France) / MRT by CLRT	3	(France) Milan Petelet	R	4–6
(France) / CLRT; (France) / MRT by CLRT	11	(France) Florian Latorre	P	All
(France) / CLRT; (France) / MRT by CLRT	15	(France) Henry Hassid	PA	1–4
(France) / CLRT; (France) / MRT by CLRT	33	(France) Evan Spenle	P	All
(France) / CLRT; (France) / MRT by CLRT	44	(France) Franck Leherpeur	Am	All
(France) / CLRT; (France) / MRT by CLRT	77	(France) Tugdual Rabreau	Am	All
(France) / CLRT; (France) / MRT by CLRT	88	(France) Steven Palette	P	3
(France) / CLRT; (France) / MRT by CLRT	99	(France) Marvin Klein	P	All
(France) / CLRT; (France) / MRT by CLRT	888	(France) Francois Lansard	PA	1–2
(France) / YDEO by Racing Technology (Note: Cars No. 7 entered as YDEO by Racing Technology and cars No. 35 and 135 entered as YDEO Compétition); (France) / YDEO Compétition	7	(France) Jérôme Boullery	PA	All
(France) / YDEO by Racing Technology; (France) / YDEO Compétition	35	(France) Benoit Fretin	Am	1–3, 5–6
(France) / YDEO by Racing Technology; (France) / YDEO Compétition	135	(France) Thomas Fretin	R	1–2, 5–6
(Italy) Ombra Racing	12	(Italy) Gianmarco Quaresmini	P	All
(France) / Pierre Martinet by Alméras (Note: Cars No. 15, 23, 36 and 911 entered as Pierre Martinet by Alméras and cars No. 19, 20, 21 and 22 entered as Martinet by Alméras); (France) / Martinet by Alméras	16	(France) Ugo Gazil	R	All
(France) / Pierre Martinet by Alméras; (France) / Martinet by Alméras	19	(France) Dorian Boccolacci	R	All
(France) / Pierre Martinet by Alméras; (France) / Martinet by Alméras	20	(New Zealand) Jaxon Evans	P	2
(France) / Pierre Martinet by Alméras; (France) / Martinet by Alméras	21	(France) Clement Mateu	PA	1–4
(France) / Pierre Martinet by Alméras; (France) / Martinet by Alméras	22	(France) Alessandro Ghiretti	R	All
(France) / Pierre Martinet by Alméras; (France) / Martinet by Alméras	23	(France) Victor Weyrich	P	1–4
(France) / Pierre Martinet by Alméras; (France) / Martinet by Alméras	36	(Australia) Cooper Murray	P	3
(France) / Pierre Martinet by Alméras; (France) / Martinet by Alméras	911	(France) Christophe Lapierre	PA	All
(Italy) EF Racing	17	(Italy) Enrico Fulgenzi	P	1–4
(Italy) EF Racing	18	(Italy) Gabriele Marotta	Am	1
(France) Spark Motorsport	53	(France) Arthur Mathieu	R	All
(France) IMSA Performance	59	(France) Maxence Maurice	Am	All
(France) IMSA Performance	76	(France) Raymond Narac	PA	All
(Italy) Krypton Motorsport	63	(Italy) Luca Pastorelli	PA	1
(Italy) Dinamic Motorsport	115	(Austria) Philipp Sager	PA	2, 5
Entrylists:

Icon	Class
P	Pro Cup
R	Rookie
PA	Pro-Am Cup
Am	Am Cup
	Guest Starter

== Results ==
Round		Circuit	Pole position	Fastest lap	Overall winner	Winning team	Rookie winner	Pro-Am winner	Am winner
1	R1	(France) Magny-Cours	(France) Dorian Boccolacci	(France) Dorian Boccolacci	(France) Dorian Boccolacci	(France) Martinet by Alméras	(France) Dorian Boccolacci	(France) Jérôme Boullery	(France) Maxence Maurice
1	R2	(France) Magny-Cours	(France) Dorian Boccolacci	(France) Dorian Boccolacci	(France) Dorian Boccolacci	(France) Martinet by Alméras	(France) Dorian Boccolacci	(France) Jérôme Boullery	(France) Maxence Maurice
2	R1	(France) Le Castellet	(France) Dorian Boccolacci	(France) Florian Latorre	(France) Dorian Boccolacci	(France) Martinet by Alméras	(France) Dorian Boccolacci	(France) Jérôme Boullery	(France) Maxence Maurice
2	R2	(France) Le Castellet	(France) Dorian Boccolacci	(France) Florian Latorre	(France) Dorian Boccolacci	(France) Martinet by Alméras	(France) Dorian Boccolacci	(Monaco) Nicolas Misslin	(France) Maxence Maurice
3	R1	(Belgium) Spa-Francorchamps	(France) Marvin Klein	(France) Marvin Klein	(France) Marvin Klein	(France) CLRT	(France) Alessandro Ghiretti	(France) Raymond Narac	(France) Maxence Maurice
3	R2	(Belgium) Spa-Francorchamps	(France) Marvin Klein	Unknown	(France) Marvin Klein	(France) CLRT	(France) Dorian Boccolacci	(France) Jérôme Boullery	(France) Maxence Maurice
4	R1	(Italy) Monza	(France) Florian Latorre	(France) Alessandro Ghiretti	(France) Marvin Klein	(France) CLRT	(France) Alessandro Ghiretti	(France) Raymond Narac	(France) Sébastien Dussolliet
4	R2	(Italy) Monza	(France) Dorian Boccolacci	(France) Marvin Klein	(France) Dorian Boccolacci	(France) Martinet by Alméras	(France) Dorian Boccolacci	(Monaco) Nicolas Misslin	(France) Maxence Maurice
5	R1	(Spain) Barcelona	(France) Florian Latorre	(France) Marvin Klein	(France) Marvin Klein	(France) CLRT	(France) Dorian Boccolacci	(France) Jérôme Boullery	(France) Tugdual Rabreau
5	R2	(Spain) Barcelona	(France) Florian Latorre	(France) Marvin Klein	(France) Marvin Klein	(France) CLRT	(France) Alessandro Ghiretti	(Monaco) Nicolas Misslin	(France) Tugdual Rabreau
6	R1	(Portugal) Portimão	(France) Florian Latorre	(France) Florian Latorre	(France) Marvin Klein	(France) CLRT	(France) Dorian Boccolacci	(France) Christophe Lapierre	(France) Tugdual Rabreau
6	R2	(Portugal) Portimão	(France) Florian Latorre	(France) Florian Latorre	(France) Florian Latorre	(France) CLRT	(France) Alessandro Ghiretti	(Monaco) Nicolas Misslin	(France) Maxence Maurice

== Standings ==
Points are awarded according to the following structure:

Position	1st	2nd	3rd	4th	5th	6th	7th	8th	9th	10th	11th	12th	13th	14th	15th	Pole	F/Lap
Points	25	20	17	14	12	10	9	8	7	6	5	4	3	2	1	1	1

=== Overall ===
Pos.	Driver	MAG (France)		LEC (France)		SPA (Belgium)		MNZ (Italy)		CAT (Spain)		ALG (Portugal)		Points
Pos.	Driver	R1	R2	R1	R2	R1	R2	R1	R2	R1	R2	R1	R2	Points
1	(France) Marvin Klein	3	5	8	3	1	1	1	2	1	1	1	Ret	232
2	(France) Dorian Boccolacci	1	1	1	1	5	2	4	1	2	4	3	Ret	229
3	(France) Florian Latorre	4	3	3	2	3	5	2	3	5	3	2	1	217
4	(France) Alessandro Ghiretti	2	2	4	5	4	4	3	5	3	2	Ret	2	181
5	(France) Jean-Baptiste Simmenauer	5	5	2	5	11	8	7	Ret	7	11	5	5	120
6	(France) Evan Spenle	7	8	7	10	7	Ret	6	6	4	5	4	3	118
7	(Italy) Gianmarco Quaresmini	8	9	5	7	9	9	18	4	6	Ret	Ret	4	88
8	(France) Ugo Gazil	12	6	24	9	6	11	20	9	8	6	20	Ret	61
9	(Germany) Richard Wagner	9	14	6	6	DNS	DNS	DNS	DNS	12	12	6	7	56
10	(France) Victor Blugeon	Ret	DNS	Ret	8	11	7	8	10	Ret	DNS	8	6	54
Pos.	Driver	R1	R2	R1	R2	R1	R2	R1	R2	R1	R2	R1	R2	Points
Pos.	Driver	MAG (France)		LEC (France)		SPA (Belgium)		MNZ (Italy)		CAT (Spain)		ALG (Portugal)		Points

== See also ==
- 2021 Porsche Supercup
