= Porsche Carrera Cup France =

French motor racing championship

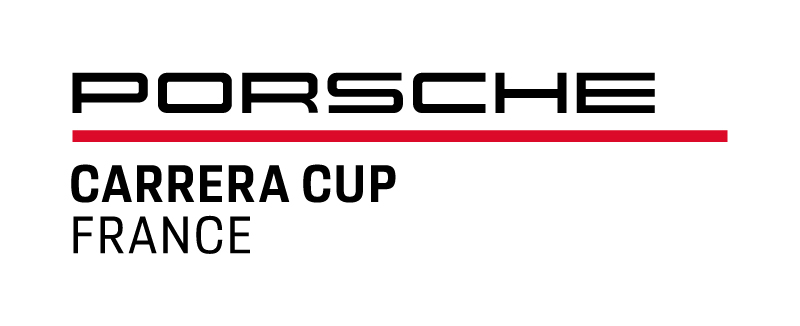
- Category: One-make racing by Porsche
- Country: France
- Inaugural season: 1987
- Constructors: Porsche
- Engine suppliers: Porsche
- Tyre suppliers: Michelin
- Drivers' champion: (France) Marvin Klein
- Teams' champion: (France) Martinet by Alméras
- Official website: Carrera Cup France

Porsche Carrera Cup France is a one make motor racing championship held in France. The cars are Porsche 911 GT3 Cup (Type 991.2) with 4.0 liters, flat-6 naturally aspirated engines that produce 485 bhp (362 kW) and 480 N·m.

== Champions ==
Season	Champion	Team Champion	Car Model
1987	(France) René Metge		Porsche 944 Turbo
1988	(France) André Bourdon		Porsche 944 Turbo
1989	(France) Michel Maisonneuve		Porsche 944 Turbo
1990	(France) Michel Maisonneuve		Porsche 944 Turbo
1991	(France) Jean-Pierre Malcher		Porsche 964
1992	(France) Dominique Dupuy		Porsche 964
1993	(France) Dominique Dupuy		Porsche 964
1994	(France) Christophe Bouchut		Porsche 964
1995	(France) Christophe Bouchut		Porsche 993
1996	(France) Christophe Bouchut		Porsche 993
1997	(France) Dominique Dupuy		Porsche 993
1998	(France) Dominique Dupuy		Porsche 993
1999	(France) Dominique Dupuy		Porsche 996
2000	(France) Christophe Bouchut		Porsche 996
2001	(France) Philippe Gache	(France) SMG	Porsche 996
2002	(France) Sébastian Dumez	(France) SMG	Porsche 996
2003	(France) Sébastian Dumez	(France) Larbre Competition	Porsche 911 GT3 Cup Type 996
2004	(France) James Ruffier	(France) Ruffier Racing	Porsche 911 GT3 Cup Type 996
2005	(France) Anthony Beltoise	(France) Team Sofrev ASP	Porsche 911 GT3 Cup Type 996
2006	(France) Anthony Beltoise	(France) Team Sofrev ASP	Porsche 911 GT3 Cup Type 997 mk I 3.600cc 420hp
2007	(France) Patrick Pilet	(France) IMSA Performance	Porsche 911 GT3 Cup Type 997 mk I 3.600cc 420hp
2008	(France) Anthony Beltoise	(France) Team Sofrev ASP	Porsche 911 GT3 Cup Type 997 mk I 3.600cc 420hp
2009	(France) Renaud Derlot	(France) Graff Racing	Porsche 911 GT3 Cup Type 997 mk I 3.600cc 420hp
2010	(France) Frédéric Makowiecki	(France) Team Sofrev ASP	Porsche 911 GT3 Cup Type 997 mk I 3.600cc 420hp
2011	(France) Kévin Estre	(France) AS Events	Porsche 911 GT3 Cup Type 997 mk II 3.800 cc 450hp
2012	(France) Jean-Karl Vernay	(France) Sébastien Loeb Racing	Porsche 911 GT3 Cup Type 997 mk II 3.800cc 450hp
2013	(France) Gaël Castelli	(France) Racing Technology	Porsche 911 GT3 Cup Type 997 mk II 3.800cc 450hp
2014	(France) Côme Ledogar	(France) IMSA Performance Matmut	Porsche 911 GT3 Cup Type 991 mk I 3.800cc 460hp
2015	(France) Maxime Jousse	(France) Sébastien Loeb Racing	Porsche 911 GT3 Cup Type 991 mk I 3.800cc 460hp
2016	(France) Mathieu Jaminet	(France) Team Martinet by Alméras	Porsche 911 GT3 Cup Type 991 mk I 3.800cc 460hp
2017	(France) Julien Andlauer	(France) Team Martinet by Alméras	Porsche 911 GT3 Cup Type 991 mk I 3.800cc 460hp
2018	(Turkey) Ayhancan Güven	(France) Team Martinet by Alméras	Porsche 911 GT3 Cup Type 991 mk II 4.000cc 485hp
2019	(Turkey) Ayhancan Güven	(France) Team Martinet by Alméras	Porsche 911 GT3 Cup Type 991 mk II 4.000cc 485hp
2020	(New Zealand) Jaxon Evans	(Austria) BWT Lechner Racing	Porsche 911 GT3 Cup Type 991 mk II 4.000cc 485hp
2021	(France) Marvin Klein	(France) CLRT	Porsche 911 GT3 Cup Type 991 mk II 4.000cc 485hp
2022	(France) Marvin Klein	(France) CLRT	Porsche 911 GT3 Cup Type 992 mk I 4.000cc 500hp
2023	(France) Dorian Boccolacci	(France) Forestier Racing CLRT	Porsche 911 GT3 Cup Type 992 mk I 4.000cc 500hp
2024	(France) Alessandro Ghiretti	(France) Schumacher CLRT	Porsche 911 GT3 Cup Type 992 mk I 4.000cc 500hp
2025	(Finland) Marcus Amand	(France) CLRT Schumacher	Porsche 911 GT3 Cup Type 992 mk I 4.000cc 500hp
2026	(France) Marvin Klein	(France) Martinet by Alméras	Porsche 911 GT3 Cup Type 992 mk I 4.000cc 500hp

== Circuits ==
- (Portugal) Algarve International Circuit (2021, 2024)
- (France) Autodrome de Linas-Montlhéry (1987–1995)
- (France) Bugatti Circuit (1987, 1989–2000, 2002–2005, 2011, 2013–2016, 2020, 2023)
- (France) Circuit d'Albi (1988–1998, 2002–2011)
- (Spain) Circuit de Barcelona-Catalunya (2016–2021, 2023–2026)
- (France) Circuit de Charade (1991, 1994–1999)
- (France) Circuit de Croix-en-Ternois (1988, 1990–1992, 2001–2002)
- (France) Bugatti Circuit (2010, 2014, 2017, 2020, 2023)
- (France) Circuit de Lédenon (1988, 1992–1994, 1996–2002, 2005–2010, 2012–2015)
- (France) Circuit de Nevers Magny-Cours (1991–1995, 1998–2010, 2012–2015, 2017–2023, 2026)
- (France) Circuit de Pau-Ville (1987–1992, 1995–1997, 2002–2006, 2012–2013)
- (Belgium) Circuit de Spa-Francorchamps (2007, 2010, 2016–2022, 2024–present)
- (France) Circuit du Val de Vienne (1993–2001, 2003–2009, 2012, 2015)
- (France) Circuit Pau-Arnos (1991, 1993)
- (France) Circuit Paul Armagnac (1987–2011, 2014, 2019, 2022, 2027)
- (France) Circuit Paul Ricard (1987–1990, 1993–1998, 2009, 2011–present)
- (Spain) Circuit Ricardo Tormo (2008, 2022, 2025)
- (Netherlands) Circuit Zandvoort (2016, 2018, 2022, 2026)
- (Spain) Circuito de Navarra (2012, 2015)
- (France) Dijon-Prenois (1987–1989, 1993–2000, 2003–2004, 2006–2009, 2011, 2017–2018, 2024–present)
- (Italy) Imola Circuit (2014, 2016, 2027)
- (Italy) Misano World Circuit (2019, 2025)
- (Italy) Monza Circuit (2001, 2010, 2021, 2023, 2027)
- (Italy) Mugello Circuit (2013, 2024)
- (Germany) Nürburgring (1999)
- (Germany) Nürburgring Nordschleife (2011)
- (Austria) Red Bull Ring (2023)
- (France) Rouen-Les-Essarts (1988–1993)
