= 2020 Porsche Carrera Cup France =

Motorsport racing season

The 2020 Porsche Carrera Cup France was the 34th season of the Porsche Carrera Cup France. The season began at Magny-Cours on 6 September and ended at Barcelona on 1 November. Races were held in France, Belgium, and Spain.

== Calendar ==
Round	Circuit	Date	Map of Circuit Locations
1	(France) Circuit de Nevers Magny-Cours	6–8 September	2020 Porsche Carrera Cup France is located in Europe
2	(France) Circuit de la Sarthe	18–19 September	2020 Porsche Carrera Cup France is located in Europe
3	(France) Circuit Paul Ricard	2–4 October	2020 Porsche Carrera Cup France is located in Europe
4	(Belgium) Circuit de Spa-Francorchamps	16–18 October	2020 Porsche Carrera Cup France is located in Europe
5	(Spain) Circuit de Barcelona-Catalunya	30 October – 1 November	2020 Porsche Carrera Cup France is located in Europe

== Entry list ==
Team	No.	Driver	Class	Rounds
(France) Martinet by Alméras (France) Pierre Martinet by Alméras	1	(Turkey) Ayhancan Güven	P	All
(France) Martinet by Alméras (France) Pierre Martinet by Alméras	20	(France) Victor Weyrich	R	All
(France) Martinet by Alméras (France) Pierre Martinet by Alméras	21	(France) Clément Mateu	PA	3
(France) Martinet by Alméras (France) Pierre Martinet by Alméras	23	(France) Marvin Klein	P	All
(France) Martinet by Alméras (France) Pierre Martinet by Alméras	30	(France) Roland Bervillé	PA	2, 5
(France) Martinet by Alméras (France) Pierre Martinet by Alméras	74	(France) Victor Blugeon	P	1, 3, 5
(France) Martinet by Alméras (France) Pierre Martinet by Alméras	88	(France) Stéphane Denoual	PA	All
(France) Martinet by Alméras (France) Pierre Martinet by Alméras	991	(Belgium) Alessio Picariello	P	1
(France) Martinet by Alméras (France) Pierre Martinet by Alméras	991	(France) Ugo Gazil	R	3–5
(France) Racing Technology	4	(France) Mathieu Blaise	Am	1–3, 5
(France) Racing Technology	7	(France) Jérôme Boullery	PA	All
(France) Racing Technology	11	(France) Sylvain Noël	PA	All
(France) Racing Technology	44	(France) Franck Leherpeur	Am	All
(France) CLRT	5	(France) Adam Eteki	P	All
(France) CLRT	22	(France) Philippe Haezebrouck	Am	1–4
(France) CLRT	26	(France) Emil Caumes	Am	All
(France) CLRT	69	(France) Florian Latorre	P	All
(France) CLRT	85	(France) Tugdual Rabreau	Am	1–3
(France) CLRT	85	(France) Hugo Chevalier	P	5
(France) CLRT	888	(France) François Lansard	Am	All
(France) IMSA Performance Matmut	14	(France) Stéphane Girardot	Am	2
(France) IMSA Performance Matmut	59	(France) Maxence Maurice	Am	All
(France) IMSA Performance Matmut	329	(France) Jean-Philippe Gambaro	Am	2
(Austria) BWT Lechner Racing	27	(France) Jean-Baptiste Simmenauer	P	All
(Austria) BWT Lechner Racing	55	(France) Nicolas Misslin	PA	All
(Austria) BWT Lechner Racing	87	(Germany) Richard Wagner	P	All
(Austria) BWT Lechner Racing	91	(New Zealand) Jaxon Evans	P	All
(France) Sébastien Loeb Racing	33	(France) Evan Spenle	R	All
(France) Sébastien Loeb Racing	911	(France) Christophe Lapierre	PA	All
(France) YDEO Compétition	35	(France) Thomas Fretin	P	2
(France) YDEO Compétition	135	(France) Benoît Fretin	Am	2
(Italy) Dinamic Motorsport	80	(United States) Jaden Conwright	P	2

Icon	Class
P	Pro Cup
R	Rookie
PA	Pro-Am Cup
Am	Am Cup
	Guest Starter

== Race results ==
Round		Circuit	Pole position	Fastest lap	Overall winner	Winning team	Pro-Am winner	Am winner
1	R1	(France) Circuit de Nevers Magny-Cours	(France) Florian Latorre	(France) Florian Latorre	(Turkey) Ayhancan Güven	(France) Martinet by Alméras	(France) Sylvain Noël	(France) Emil Caumes
1	R2	(France) Circuit de Nevers Magny-Cours	(France) Florian Latorre	(France) Jean-Baptiste Simmenauer	(France) Florian Latorre	(France) CLRT	(France) Christophe Lapierre	(France) Maxence Maurice
2	R1	(France) Circuit de la Sarthe	(France) Florian Latorre	(New Zealand) Jaxon Evans	(Turkey) Ayhancan Güven	(France) Martinet by Alméras	(France) Sylvain Noël	(France) François Lansard
3	R1	(France) Circuit Paul Ricard	(France) Florian Latorre	(France) Adam Eteki	(France) Adam Eteki	(France) CLRT	(France) Christophe Lapierre	(France) François Lansard
3	R2	(France) Circuit Paul Ricard	(France) Florian Latorre	(France) Jean-Baptiste Simmenauer	(France) Florian Latorre	(France) CLRT	(France) Nicolas Misslin	(France) François Lansard
3	R3	(France) Circuit Paul Ricard	(France) Jean-Baptiste Simmenauer	(New Zealand) Jaxon Evans	(France) Jean-Baptiste Simmenauer	(Austria) BWT Lechner Racing	(France) Nicolas Misslin	(France) Emil Caumes
4	R1	(Belgium) Circuit de Spa-Francorchamps	(France) Marvin Klein	(New Zealand) Jaxon Evans	(France) Marvin Klein	(France) Martinet by Alméras	(France) Sylvain Noël	(France) Emil Caumes
4	R2	(Belgium) Circuit de Spa-Francorchamps	(Turkey) Ayhancan Güven	(Turkey) Ayhancan Güven	(Turkey) Ayhancan Güven	(France) Martinet by Alméras	(France) Sylvain Noël	(France) François Lansard
5	R1	(Spain) Circuit de Barcelona-Catalunya	(France) Florian Latorre	(France) Florian Latorre	(New Zealand) Jaxon Evans	(Austria) BWT Lechner Racing	(France) Nicolas Misslin	(France) François Lansard
5	R2	(Spain) Circuit de Barcelona-Catalunya	(France) Florian Latorre	(France) Adam Eteki	(New Zealand) Jaxon Evans	(Austria) BWT Lechner Racing	(France) Nicolas Misslin	(France) Emil Caumes

== Championship standings ==
Points are awarded according to the following structure:

Position	1st	2nd	3rd	4th	5th	6th	7th	8th	9th	10th	11th	12th	13th	14th	15th	Pole	F/Lap
Points	25	20	17	14	12	10	9	8	7	6	5	4	3	2	1	1	1

=== Overall ===
Pos.	Driver	MAG (France)		LMS (France)	LEC (France)			SPA (Belgium)		CAT (Spain)		Points
1	(New Zealand) Jaxon Evans	2	4	22	3	2	2	3	3	1	1	178
2	(Turkey) Ayhancan Güven	1	5	1	4	5	3	4	1	19	2	166
3	(France) Florian Latorre	5	1	6	5	1	5	2	2	11	Ret	153
4	(France) Jean-Baptiste Simmenauer	3	2	3	6	4	1	5	4	2	Ret	152
5	(France) Marvin Klein	6	3	4	2	3	4	1	5	Ret	3	147
6	(France) Adam Eteki	4	7	2	1	6	6	8	6	5	4	134
7	(France) Victor Weyrich	7	9	8	9	7	7	14	8	8	6	81
8	(France) Nicolas Misslin	13	12	13	14	9	9	9	11	7	9	57
9	(Germany) Richard Wagner	16	10	7	8	10	Ret	6	Ret	4	16	55
10	(France) Christophe Lapierre	9	11	10	10	11	12	11	10	9	Ret	53
11	(France) Victor Blugeon	14	8		7	13	8			3	13	51
12	(France) Sylvain Noël	8	15	9	13	14	18	7	9	Ret	11	44
13	(France) Evan Spenle	12	18	11			11	Ret	7	10	8	40
14	(France) Ugo Gazil				12	8	Ret	10	14	12	7	35
15	(France) Jérôme Boullery	10	14	12	11	15	10	16	13	13	Ret	32
16	(France) Stéphane Denoual	11	13	25	17	12	13	15	Ret	Ret	10	23
17	(France) François Lansard	18	Ret	14	15	17	16	17	12	14	14	15
18	(France) Emil Caumes	15	17	19	18	18	14	12	16	15	12	14
19	(Belgium) Alessio Picariello	Ret	6									10
20	(France) Maxence Maurice	17	16	Ret	19	21	17	14	DSQ	Ret	Ret	3
21	(France) Franck Leherpeur	19	19	16	22	19	20	18	17	17	15	3
22	(France) Roland Bervillé			15						Ret	Ret	2
23	(France) Philippe Haezebrouck	22	Ret	24	23	22	22	19	15			1
24	(France) Mathieu Blaise	21	20	DNS	21	20	19			16	DNS	1
25	(France) Tugdual Rabreau	20	21	17	20	23	21					0
Guest drivers ineligible to score points
-	(France) Hugo Chevalier									6	5	-
-	(United States) Jaden Conwright			5								-
-	(France) Clément Mateu				24	Ret	15					-
-	(France) Jean-Philippe Gambaro			18								-
-	(France) Stéphane Girardot			20								-
-	(France) Benoît Fretin			21								-
-	(France) Thomas Fretin			23								-
Pos.	Driver	MAG (France)		LMS (France)	LEC (France)			SPA (Belgium)		CAT (Spain)		Points

=== Pro-Am ===
Pos.	Driver	MAG (France)		LMS (France)	LEC (France)			SPA (Belgium)		CAT (Spain)		Points
1	(France) Nicolas Misslin	5	2	4	4	1	1	2	3	1	1	182
2	(France) Christophe Lapierre	2	1	2	1	2	3	3	2	2	Ret	171
3	(France) Sylvain Noël	1	5	1	3	4	6	1	1	4	3	166
4	(France) Jérôme Boullery	3	4	3	2	5	2	5	4	3	Ret	132
5	(France) Stéphane Denoual	4	3	6	5	3	4	4	Ret	Ret	2	118
6	(France) Roland Bervillé			5						Ret	Ret	12
Guest drivers ineligible to score points
-	(France) Clément Mateu				6	Ret	5					-
Pos.	Driver	MAG (France)		LMS (France)	LEC (France)			SPA (Belgium)		CAT (Spain)		Points

=== Am ===
Pos.	Driver	MAG (France)		LMS (France)	LEC (France)			SPA (Belgium)		CAT (Spain)		Points
1	(France) François Lansard	3	Ret	1	1	1	2	3	1	1	2	191
2	(France) Emil Caumes	1	2	5	2	2	1	1	3	2	1	187
3	(France) Franck Leherpeur	4	3	2	6	3	5	4	4	4	3	127
4	(France) Maxence Maurice	2	1	Ret	3	5	3	2	DSQ	Ret	Ret	115
5	(France) Philippe Haezebrouck	7	Ret	9	7	6	7	5	2			81
6	(France) Mathieu Blaise	6	4	DNS	5	4	4			3	DNS	81
7	(France) Tugdual Rabreau	5	5	3	4	7	6					74
Guest drivers ineligible to score points
-	(France) Jean-Philippe Gambaro			4								-
-	(France) Stéphane Girardot			6								-
-	(France) Benoît Fretin			7								-
-	(France) Thomas Fretin			8								-
Pos.	Driver	MAG (France)		LMS (France)	LEC (France)			SPA (Belgium)		CAT (Spain)		Points

=== Teams ===
==== Scoring system ====
- Results for teams are awarded independently from the drivers' championship.
- Only the best two results count for teams fielding more than two entries.

Pos.	Team	Points
1	(Austria) BWT Lechner Racing	330
2	(France) Martinet by Alméras	313
3	(France) CLRT	287
4	(France) Pierre Martinet by Alméras	130
5	(France) Sébastien Loeb Racing	93
Pos.	Team	Points
