= Lasse Sørensen (racing driver) =

Danish racing driver

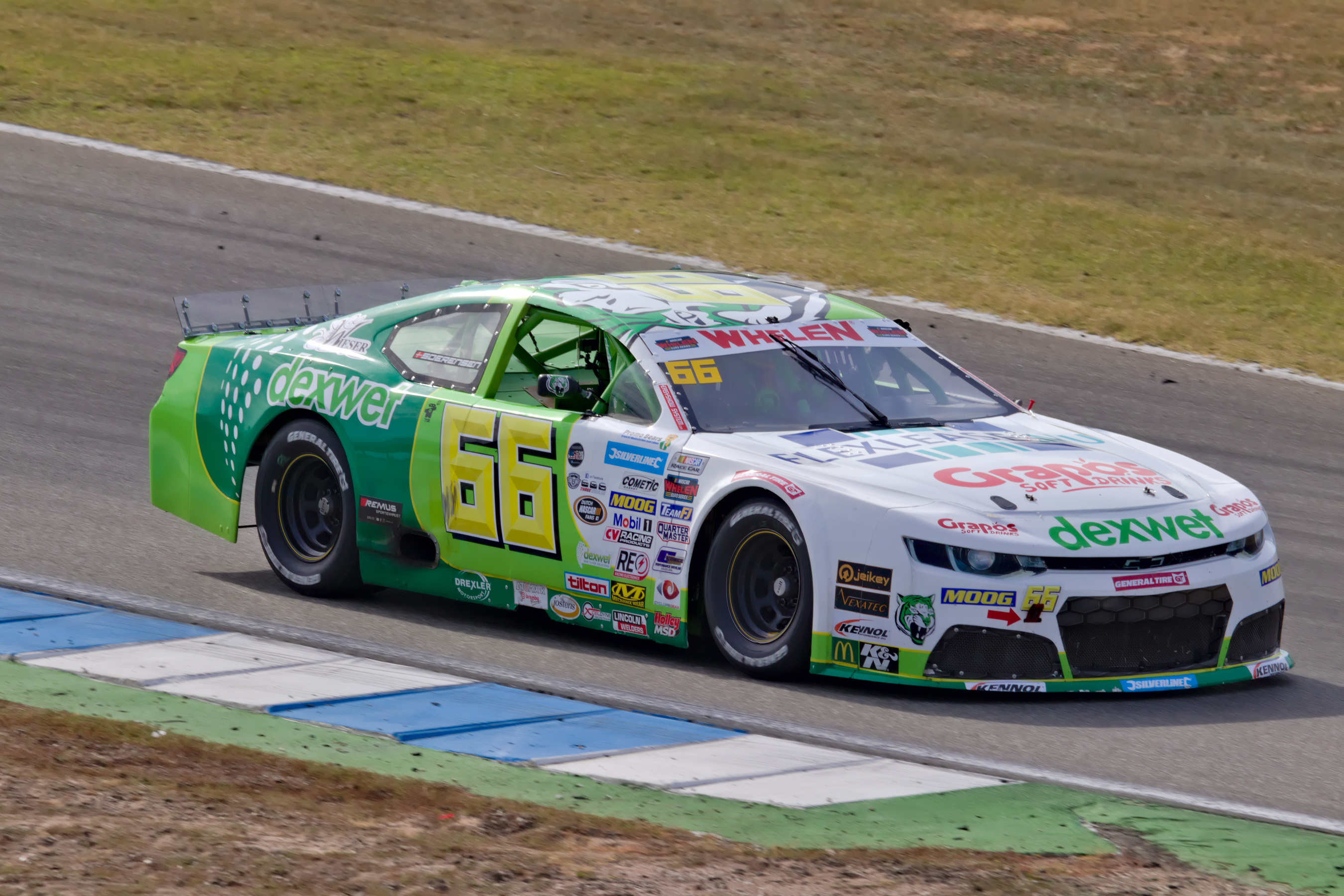
- Sørensen racing at Hockenheim in 2019
- Nationality: (Denmark) Danish
- Born: Lasse Lorentz Sørensen; 7 December 1996 (age 29) Aalborg, Denmark
- Relatives: Marco Sørensen (brother)

NASCAR Whelen Euro Series career
- Debut season: 2019
- Current team: DF1 Racing
- Car number: 66
- Starts: 12 (EuroNASCAR PRO); 11 (Elite 2)
- Championships: 1 (2019 Elite 2)
- Wins: 2 (EuroNASCAR PRO); 7 (Elite 2)
- Poles: 2 (EuroNASCAR PRO); 1 (Elite 2)
- Fastest laps: 1 (EuroNASCAR PRO); 1 (Elite 2)
- Best finish: 1st in 2019 (Elite 2)
- Finished last season: 41st in 2019 (Elite 1), 1st in 2019 (Elite 2)

Previous series
- 2016-18 2015 2014 2012-13 2012 2012 1998-2013: MASCOT Danish Thundersport Championship; Formula Renault 2.0 NEC; French F4 Championship; Formula Ford Denmark; Formula Ford NEZ; Dutch Formula Ford Championship; Karting

Championship titles
- 2019 2014: NASCAR Whelen Euro Series – Elite 2 French F4 Championship

Lasse Lorentz Sørensen (born 7 December 1996) is a Danish professional racing driver. He currently competes in the NASCAR Whelen Euro Series, driving the No. 66 Chevrolet Camaro for DF1 Racing in both the Elite 1 and Elite 2 class and is the defending Elite 2 Champion. Sørensen won the French F4 Championship in 2014, and has competed in categories such as Formula Ford Denmark and Eurocup Formula Renault 2.0 in the past.

== Racing career ==
Sørensen began his career in 1998 in karting. In 2012, he switched to the Danish Formula Ford championship, he raced there from 2012 to 2013 ending second in the standings in 2013. He also competed in the Formula Ford NEZ and Dutch Formula Ford championships that year. He switched to the French F4 Championship for the 2014 season. Sørensen won the championship that year, with 387 points.

In January 2015, Sørensen switched to the Eurocup Formula Renault 2.0, driving for Manor MP Motorsport. In 2016, Sørensen began competing in the MASCOT Danish Thundersport Championship, winning the championship in 2017 ahead from Jan Magnussen.

In 2019, Sørensen made his stock car racing debut when he took part in the second round of the 2019 NASCAR Whelen Euro Series season at Franciacorta. Driving for Dexwet-df1 Racing in the Elite 2 class, Sørensen scored a double podium finish on his debut weekend, including winning his very first NASCAR race after race leader Andre Castro suffered a mechanical issue on the penultimate lap.

Sørensen would make his Elite 1 class debut at the following round in Brands Hatch, replacing Christophe Bouchut who left the team during the Franciacorta weekend. In Brands Hatch, Sørensen became the first Euro Series driver to win from last on the grid in Race 1 before eventually sweeping the weekend with a late-race pass on Andre Castro to win Race 2. He followed it up with his fourth victory of the season at the Sunday race in Most. Another victory would follow at Hockenheim before he win both races at Zolder to win the Elite 2 championship title by nine points ahead of Giorgio Maggi despite missing the first two races of the season. Sørensen finished his debut season with seven wins, ten podiums, and top-ten finishes in all 11 races that he took part in 2019.

== Racing record ==
=== Career summary ===
Season	Series	Team	Races	Wins	Poles	F/Laps	Podiums	Points	Position
2012	Formula Ford Denmark	Fluid Motorsport	21	1	0	0	7	226	5th
2012	Dutch Formula Ford Championship	Fluid Motorsport	3	1	0	2	1	44	17th
2012	Formula Ford NEZ	Fluid Motorsport	3	0	0	0	0	16	7th
2013	Formula Ford Denmark	RS Competition	23	8	3	5	19	383	**2nd**
2014	French F4 Championship	Auto Sport Academy	21	8	5	9	17	387	**1st**
2015	Formula Renault 2.0 NEC	Manor MP Motorsport	2	0	0	0	0	23	29th
2015	Eurocup Formula Renault 2.0	Manor MP Motorsport	7	0	0	0	0	0	26th
2016	MASCOT Danish Thundersport Championship	Demetra by Massive Motorsport	9	1	0	0	3	119	11th
2016	24H Series - A2	presenza.eu Racing Team Clio							
2017	MASCOT Danish Thundersport Championship	Flexlease.nu/Strøjer Tegl	20	6	1	4	16	365	**1st**
2018	MASCOT Danish Thundersport Championship	Team Flexlease	21	3	2	5	13	303	**2nd**
2019	NASCAR Whelen Euro Series – Elite 2	Dexwet-df1 Racing	11	7	1	1	10	573	**1st**
2019	NASCAR Whelen Euro Series	Dexwet-df1 Racing	2	0	0	0	0	40	41st
2020	NASCAR Whelen Euro Series	DF1 Racing	10	2	2	1	6	411	**2nd**

=== Complete Eurocup Formula Renault 2.0 results ===
(key) (Races in bold indicate pole position; races in italics indicate fastest lap)

Year	Entrant	1	2	3	4	5	6	7	8	9	10	11	12	13	14	15	16	17	DC	Points
2015	Manor MP Motorsport	ALC; 1; 20	ALC; 2; 21	ALC; 3 Ret	SPA; 1; 15	SPA; 2; 15	HUN; 1 Ret	HUN; 2 Ret	SIL; 1	SIL; 2	SIL; 3	NÜR; 1	NÜR; 2	LMS; 1	LMS; 2	JER; 1	JER; 2	JER; 3	26th	0

=== Complete Formula Renault 2.0 NEC results ===
(key) (Races in bold indicate pole position) (Races in italics indicate fastest lap)

Year	Entrant	1	2	3	4	5	6	7	8	9	10	11	12	13	14	15	16	DC	Points
2015	Manor MP Motorsport	MNZ; 1; 12	MNZ; 2; 7	SIL; 1	SIL; 2	RBR; 1	RBR; 2	RBR; 3	SPA; 1	SPA; 2	ASS; 1	ASS; 2	NÜR; 1	NÜR; 2	HOC; 1	HOC; 2	HOC; 3	29th	23

=== Complete NASCAR results ===
(key) (Bold – Pole position. Italics – Fastest lap. * – Most laps led. ^ – Most positions gained)

==== Whelen Euro Series – EuroNASCAR PRO ====
NASCAR Whelen Euro Series – EuroNASCAR PRO results
Year	Team	No.	Make	1	2	3	4	5	6	7	8	9	10	11	12	13	NWES	Pts
2019	Dexwet-df1 Racing	66	Chevy	VAL	VAL	FRA	FRA	BRH; 28	BRH; 10^	MOS	MOS	VEN	HOC	HOC	ZOL	ZOL	41st	40
2020	DF1 Racing	66	Chevy	ITA; 6^	**ITA**; 5	**ZOL**; 1	ZOL; 9^	MOS; 3	MOS; 3	VAL; 1	VAL; 6	ESP; 2	ESP; 2				2nd	411

==== Whelen Euro Series – Elite 2 ====
NASCAR Whelen Euro Series – Elite 2 results
Year	Team	No.	Make	1	2	3	4	5	6	7	8	9	10	11	12	13	NWES	Pts
2019	Dexwet-df1 Racing	66	Chevy	VAL	VAL	FRA; 1	FRA; 3	BRH; 1^	BRH; 1	MOS; 2	MOS; 1*	VEN; 7	HOC; 2	HOC; 1*	ZOL; 1	**ZOL**; 1*	1st	573

Sporting positions
Preceded by Anthoine Hubert	French F4 Championship; Champion; 2014	Succeeded by Valentin Moineault
Preceded by Ulysse Delsaux	NASCAR Whelen Euro Series; Elite 2 Champion; 2019	Succeeded by Vittorio Ghirelli (EuroNASCAR 2)
