= Dorian Boccolacci =

French racing driver (born 1998)

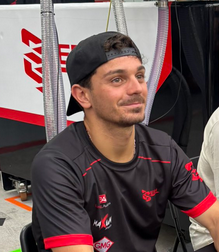
- Boccolacci at the 2025 Super GT Malaysia Festival
- Nationality: (France) French
- Born: Dorian Maurice Gines Daniel Joan Boccolacci; 9 September 1998 (age 28) Cannes, France

GT World Challenge Asia career
- Debut season: 2024
- Current team: Phantom Global Racing
- Categorisation: FIA Gold
- Car number: 37
- Co-driver: Anthony Liu
- Starts: 7 (7 entries)
- Wins: 0
- Podiums: 3
- Poles: 0
- Fastest laps: 0
- Best finish: 23rd in 2024

Previous series
- 2018-19 2017-18 2016 2016 2015 2014: FIA Formula 2 Championship; GP3 Series; Eurocup Formula Renault 2.0; Formula Renault 2.0 NEC; FIA F3 European; French F4 Championship

Championship titles
- 2023 2018-19 2014: Porsche Carrera Cup France; Andros Trophy Elite Class; French F4 Junior

Dorian Maurice Gines Daniel Joan Boccolacci (born 9 September 1998 in Cannes) is a French racing driver who currently competes in the GT World Challenge Europe Endurance Cup for Boutsen Ginion Racing and in the GT World Challenge Asia for Phantom Global Racing. A single-seater graduate, having won races in GP3 and raced in FIA Formula 2, Boccolacci later joined sports car racing, becoming the 2023 Porsche Carrera Cup France champion.

== Early career ==
=== Karting and junior formulae ===
Born in Cannes, Boccolacci began karting in 2007 at the age of nine, competing in competitions across Europe. He graduated to single-seaters in 2014, competing in the French F4 Championship. There he scored two victories, pole positions and fastest laps and finished as Junior champion and runner-up in the overall standings. In 2015, Boccolacci switched to the FIA Formula 3 European Championship, racing with Signature. In contrast to his season in French F4, Boccolacci only finished twelfth in the rookie championship and nineteenth in the overall standings. He subsequently stepped down on the ladder, joining Tech 1 Racing for the 2016 season of the Formula Renault Eurocup and NEC series. Scoring three wins across both series, Boccolacci finished runner-up in the Eurocup standings and third overall in NEC.

=== GP3 and Formula 2 ===
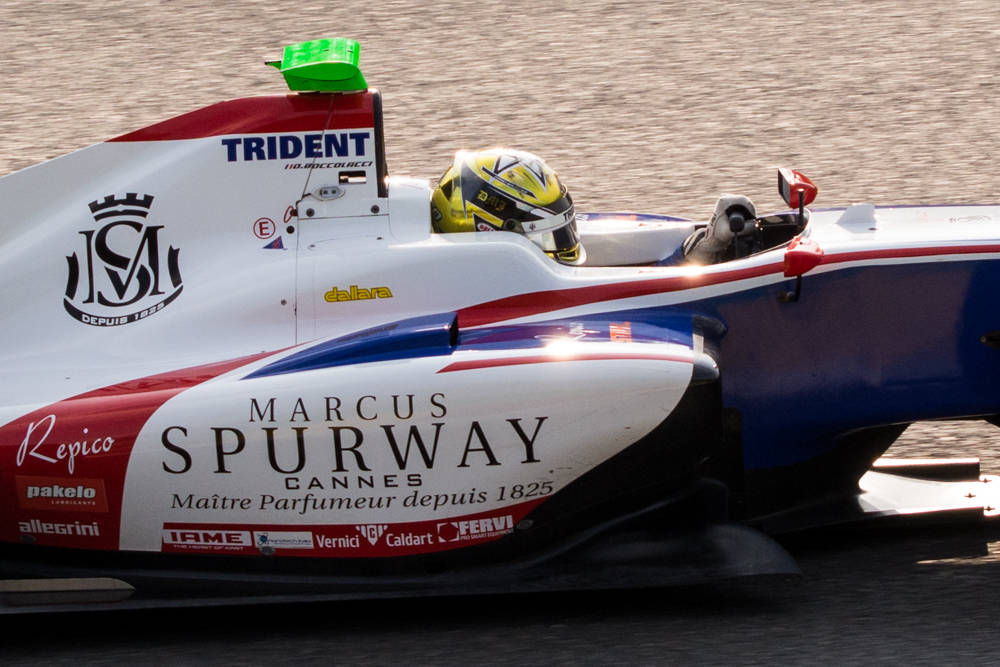
Boccolacci during the 2017 Spa-Francorchamps GP3 Series round

In November 2016, Boccolacci made his GP3 debut in the post-season test at Yas Marina with Arden International and DAMS. He would eventually join Trident for the 2017 season. During the campaign, Boccolacci achieved a race win at the final round, which helped him towards sixth place in the championship. He returned for the following season, switching to newcomers MP Motorsport. Once again, the season yielded one win, though another win went begging when he was stripped from victory post-race at Le Castellet due to a technical infringement. Boccolacci ended up tenth in the standings, switching to Formula 2 in the middle of the year to replace Roberto Merhi at MP, where he scored two points finishes.

In 2019, Boccolacci began the F2 season at Campos Racing alongside Jack Aitken. Having struggled at the opening round, stronger performances at the street circuits of Baku and Monaco gave Boccolacci his first points of the year. However, Boccolacci left the team after the next round, only returning for a one-off appearance at Silverstone for Trident.

During his pathway up the single-seater ladder, Boccolacci was also named as one of the eight drivers to be signed to the Venturi Formula E team's new Next Gen Programme in 2018.

== GT career ==
=== GT3 beginnings (2019–20) ===
Near the end of 2019, Boccolacci made his debut in GT3, driving for Saintéloc Racing alongside former Le Mans winner Stéphane Ortelli in the Blancpain GT Series Sprint Cup. He remained with the team for the 2020 season, partnering Christopher Haase and Markus Winkelhock in the GT World Challenge Europe Endurance Cup. The trio finished 15th in the standings, having taken a best result of fifth at the opening round. The Frenchman also paired up with Mick Wishofer at Team Zakspeed in that year's ADAC GT Masters. At the penultimate round held on the Lausitzring, Boccolacci and Wishofer scored a surprise victory during a wet race 2, with Boccolacci charging up the field during the opening stint before his Austrian teammate passed two cars to win the race. This result helped them to finish 12th overall. During the same year, Boccolacci also took part in the 24 Hours of Nürburgring, where he won the V6 class which contained two entries, as well as triumphing in two races of the Lamborghini Super Trofeo Europe.

=== Porsche Cup series (2021–23) ===
For 2021, Boccolacci switched to the Porsche Carrera Cup world, driving full campaigns in the main Supercup series as well as the Porsche Carrera Cup France with Martinet by Alméras. He scored two podiums in the former, which included third place at the Monaco Grand Prix support race — Boccolacci's debut in the series — on his way to sixth place overall. The latter championship yielded even more success, as Boccolacci won four races, including both races at the first round, and came close to the title, losing out to Marvin Klein by just three points at the final round. Said event decided the title in spectacular fashion, with Boccolacci colliding with his title rival, therefore handing the championship to Klein.

Boccolacci remained at Alméras for both the Supercup and PCCF seasons in 2022. He improved his finishing position at Monaco with a second place, but would ultimately end up seventh in the Supercup standings, as two retirements blighted his campaign. Meanwhile in the French championship, Boccolacci took five victories and finished on the rostrum in all but two races on his way to another runner-up finish to an ultimately dominant Marvin King. For his third year racing Porsches, Boccolacci made a switch to CLRT. This would end up being his most successful Supercup season to date, as he scored his first pole position at Silverstone and took two podiums, which contributed to him placing fifth overall. His third PCCF season meanwhile finally brought him the title, which Boccolacci attained after pairing a win at Magny-Cours with five successive victories in the final five races, allowing him to beat Alessandro Ghiretti by 24 points.

=== GT3 return (2024–present) ===
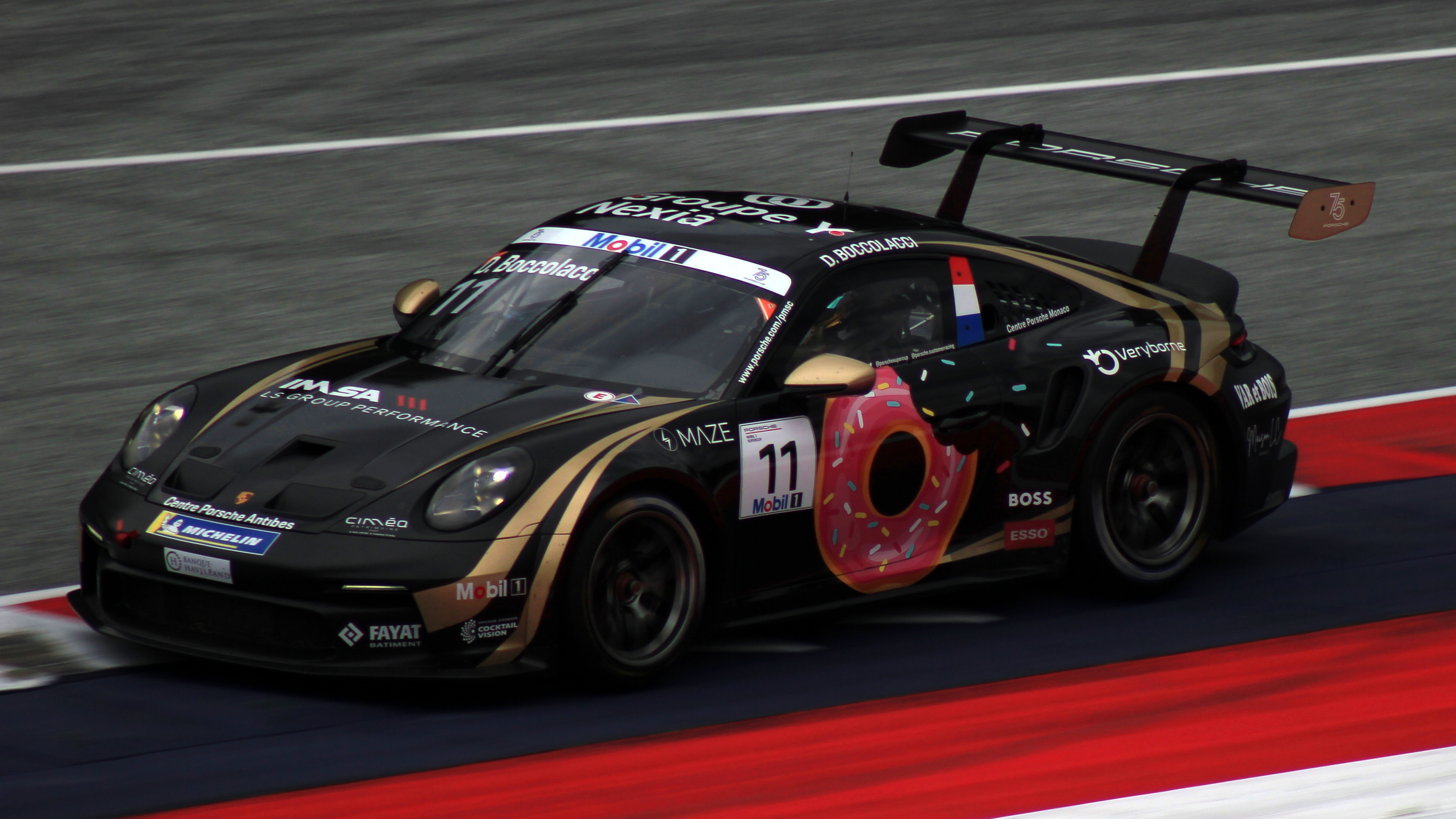
Boccolacci at the Red Bull Ring in 2023

After competing in two races of the Asian Le Mans Series with Huber Motorsport, Boccolacci made a full-time return to the GT3 world, driving a Porsche 911 GT3 R (992) for Schumacher CLRT in the GT World Challenge Europe Endurance Cup alongside fellow former Porsche Cup drivers Ayhancan Güven and Laurin Heinrich. The trio only finished in the points once, scoring a second place at the Nürburgring, and ended up 15th in the drivers' standings.

In 2025, Boccolacci partnered Anthony Liu Xu at Phantom Global Racing in the GT World Challenge Asia series. They scored four overall podiums, including a Pro-Am class win at Okayama, and finished fourth in the overall and Pro-Am championships. Boccolacci also drove for Falken Motorsports in the Nürburgring Langstrecken-Serie, winning NLS2 with Alessio Picariello and NLS10 with Nico Menzel.

At the start of 2026, Boccolacci finished second overall in the Bathurst 12 Hour race, driving in a Pro-Am class entry together with Anders Fjordbach and Kerong Li.

== Racing record ==
=== Career summary ===
Season	Series	Team	Races	Wins	Poles	F/Laps	Podiums	Points	Position
2014	French F4 Championship	Auto Sport Academy	21	2	2	2	8	238	**2nd**
2015	FIA Formula 3 European Championship	Signature	33	0	0	0	0	27	19th
2015	Macau Grand Prix	Signature	1	0	0	0	0	N/A	11th
2016	Eurocup Formula Renault 2.0	Tech 1 Racing	15	2	2	3	7	200	**2nd**
2016	Formula Renault 2.0 NEC	Tech 1 Racing	15	1	0	0	5	226	**3rd**
2016	Euroformula Open Championship	Teo Martín Motorsport	2	0	0	0	1	0	NC†
2017	GP3 Series	Trident	15	1	0	0	3	93	6th
2017–18	Andros Trophy - Électrique Class	SPI Logistics	3	1	1	1	1	82	12th
2018	GP3 Series	MP Motorsport	10	1	1	1	1	58	10th
2018	FIA Formula 2 Championship	MP Motorsport	8	0	0	0	0	3	21st
2018–19	Andros Trophy - Elite Class	CMR	11	8	7	7	10	647	**1st**
2019	FIA Formula 2 Championship	Campos Racing	10	0	0	0	0	30	14th
2019	FIA Formula 2 Championship	Trident	2	0	0	0	0	30	14th
2019	Blancpain GT Series Sprint Cup	Saintéloc Racing	4	0	0	0	0	0	NC
2020	ADAC GT Masters	Team Zakspeed BKK Mobil Oil Racing	14	1	0	0	1	70	12th
2020	Lamborghini Super Trofeo Europe	Oregon Team	8	2	0	0	4	74	5th
2020	GT World Challenge Europe Endurance Cup	Saintéloc Racing	4	0	0	0	0	22	15th
2020	Intercontinental GT Challenge	Audi Sport Team Saintéloc Racing	1	0	0	0	0	10	16th
2020	24 Hours of Nürburgring - V6	Team Mathol Racing e.V.	1	1	0	0	1	N/A	**1st**
2021	Porsche Supercup	Martinet by Alméras	8	0	0	0	2	81	6th
2021	Porsche Carrera Cup France	Martinet by Alméras	12	4	5	1	8	229	**2nd**
2021	Porsche Carrera Cup Germany	Martinet by Alméras	4	0	0	1	0	0	NC†
2021–22	Andros Trophy - Elite Pro Class	Saintéloc Racing	9	0	0	0	4	488	5th
2022	Porsche Supercup	Martinet by Alméras	8	0	0	0	1	59	7th
2022	Porsche Carrera Cup France	Martinet by Alméras	12	5	5	4	10	245	**2nd**
2022	Ultimate Cup Series - GT Endurance - Porsche Cup	Martinet by Alméras	1	0	0	0	0	20	13th
2022	Nürburgring Endurance Series - Cup2	Team Mathol Racing e.V	4	0	1	0	2	27	38th
2022–23	Andros Trophy - Elite Pro Class	Sébastien Loeb Racing	10	3	1	2	4	521	**2nd**
2023	Porsche Supercup	CLRT	8	0	1	0	2	79	5th
2023	GT World Challenge Europe Endurance Cup	CLRT	1	0	0	0	0	0	NC
2023	GT World Challenge Europe Endurance Cup - Pro-Am	CLRT	1	0	0	0	1	19	15th
2023	Porsche Carrera Cup France	CLRT	11	5	7	5	9	239	**1st**
2023	Nürburgring Endurance Series - Cup2	Team Mathol Racing e.V.	2	0	0	0	0	0	NC†
2023–24	Asian Le Mans Series - GT	Huber Motorsport	2	0	0	0	0	0	35th
2024	GT World Challenge Europe Endurance Cup	Schumacher CLRT	5	0	0	0	1	18	15th
2024	GT World Challenge Asia	Phantom Global Racing	4	0	0	?	1	28	23rd
2025	GT World Challenge Australia - Pro-Am	EMA Motorsport	2	0	1	0	0	13	22nd
2025	GT World Challenge Asia	Phantom Global Racing	12	0	0	0	4	99	4th
2025	FIA GT World Cup	Phantom Global Racing	1	0	0	0	0	N/A	DNF
2025	Intercontinental GT Challenge	Phantom Global Racing	1	0	0	0	0	6	28th
2025	Intercontinental GT Challenge	Falken Motorsports	1	0	0	0	0	6	28th
2025	Nürburgring Endurance Series - SP9	Falken Motorsports	5	2	0	0	3	0	NC
2025	24 Hours of Nürburgring - SP9	Falken Motorsports	1	0	0	0	0	N/A	DNF
2025	Super GT - GT300	EBM Giga Racing	1	0	0	0	0	0	NC†
2025	TSS The Super Series - GT3	AAS Motorsport by EBM	2	1	1	0	2	0	NC†
2025–26	24H Series Middle East - GT3	EBM							
2026	Nürburgring Langstrecken-Serie - SP9	Dunlop Motorsports							
2026	24 Hours of Nürburgring - SP9	Dunlop Motorsports	1	0	0	0	0	N/A	DNF
2026	GT World Challenge Asia	Phantom Global Racing	4	0	0	0	2	47	14th
2026	GT World Challenge Europe Endurance Cup	Boutsen VDS	5	0	1	0	1	35	6th
2026	GT World Challenge Europe Sprint Cup	Boutsen VDS	10	0	1	2	2	30.5	9th
2026	Intercontinental GT Challenge	High Class Racing	1	0	0	0	1	39	9th
2026	Intercontinental GT Challenge	Dunlop Motorsports	1	0	0	0	0	39	9th
2026	Intercontinental GT Challenge	Boutsen VDS	1	0	0	0	0	39	9th
2026	Intercontinental GT Challenge	Absolute Racing	1	0	0	0	1	39	9th
2026	FIA GT World Cup	Absolute Racing							

^{†} As Boccolacci was a guest driver, he was ineligible for championship points. ^{*} Season still in progress.

=== Complete French F4 Championship results ===
(key) (Races in bold indicate pole position) (Races in italics indicate fastest lap)

Year	1	2	3	4	5	6	7	8	9	10	11	12	13	14	15	16	17	18	19	20	21	DC	Points
2014	LMS; 1; 3	LMS; 2; 5	LMS; 3; 4	**PAU**; **1**; 1	PAU; 2; 9	**PAU**; **3**; 1	VDV; 1; 7	VDV; 2; 4	VDV; 3; 2	MAG; 1; 3	MAG; 2 Ret	MAG; 3; 12	NOG; 1; 2	NOG; 2; 4	NOG; 3; 2	JER; 1; 4	JER; 2; 6	JER; 3; 20	LEC; 1; 5	LEC; 2 Ret	LEC; 3; 3	2nd	238

=== Complete FIA Formula 3 European Championship results ===
(key) (Races in bold indicate pole position) (Races in italics indicate fastest lap)

Year	Entrant	Engine	1	2	3	4	5	6	7	8	9	10	11	12	13	14	15	16	17	18	19	20	21	22	23	24	25	26	27	28	29	30	31	32	33	DC	Points
2015	Signature	Volkswagen	SIL; 1; 21	SIL; 2 Ret	SIL; 3; 17	HOC; 1; 20	HOC; 2; 32	HOC; 3; 12	PAU; 1 Ret	PAU; 2; 26	PAU; 3; 14	MNZ; 1 Ret	MNZ; 2; 28	MNZ; 3 EX	SPA; 1; 18	SPA; 2; 5	SPA; 3; 13	NOR; 1; 6	NOR; 2; 8	NOR; 3; 8	ZAN; 1; 15	ZAN; 2 Ret	ZAN; 3; 25	RBR; 1; 16	RBR; 2; 17	RBR; 3; 17	ALG; 1; 22	ALG; 2; 16	ALG; 3; 10	NÜR; 1; 21	NÜR; 2; 17	NÜR; 3 Ret	HOC; 1; 30	HOC; 2; 15	HOC; 3; 24	19th	27

=== Complete Formula Renault Eurocup results ===
(key) (Races in bold indicate pole position) (Races in italics indicate fastest lap)

Year	Team	1	2	3	4	5	6	7	8	9	10	11	12	13	14	15	Pos	Points
2016	Tech 1 Racing	ALC; 1; 11	ALC; 2; 2	ALC; 3; 4	MON; 1; 4	**MNZ**; **1**; 2	MNZ; 2; 1	MNZ; 1; 3	RBR; 1; 10	RBR; 2; 4	LEC; 1; 5	LEC; 2; 3	SPA; 1; 2	SPA; 2; 1	EST; 1; 5	EST; 2; 4	2nd	200

=== Complete Formula Renault 2.0 NEC results ===
(key) (Races in bold indicate pole position) (Races in italics indicate fastest lap)

Year	Entrant	1	2	3	4	5	6	7	8	9	10	11	12	13	14	15	DC	Points
2016	Tech 1 Racing	MNZ; 1; 1	MNZ; 2; 5	SIL; 1; 2	SIL; 2; 3	HUN; 1; 17	HUN; 2; 8	SPA; 1; 2	SPA; 2; 6	ASS; 1; 2	ASS; 2; 4	NÜR; 1; 5	NÜR; 2 Ret	HOC; 1; 11	HOC; 2; 22	HOC; 3; 8	3rd	226

=== Complete GP3 Series results ===
(key) (Races in bold indicate pole position) (Races in italics indicate fastest lap)

Year	Entrant	1	2	3	4	5	6	7	8	9	10	11	12	13	14	15	16	17	18	Pos	Points
2017	Trident	CAT; FEA; 6	CAT; SPR; 2	RBR; FEA; 9	RBR; SPR; 17†	SIL; FEA; 8	SIL; SPR; Ret	HUN; FEA; 5	HUN; SPR; 4	SPA; FEA; 5	SPA; SPR; 17	MNZ; FEA; 14	MNZ; SPR; C	JER; FEA; 7	JER; SPR; 2	YMC; FEA; 7	YMC; SPR; 1			6th	93
2018	MP Motorsport	CAT; FEA; 5	CAT; SPR; 5	**LEC**; **FEA**; DSQ	LEC; SPR; 14	RBR; FEA; 10	RBR; SPR; 5	SIL; FEA; 5	SIL; SPR; 9	HUN; FEA; 8	HUN; SPR; 1	SPA; FEA	SPA; SPR	MNZ; FEA	MNZ; SPR	SOC; FEA	SOC; SPR	YMC; FEA	YMC; SPR	10th	58

^{†} Driver did not finish the race, but was classified as he completed over 90% of the race distance.

=== Complete FIA Formula 2 Championship results ===
(key) (Races in bold indicate pole position) (Races in italics indicate points for the fastest lap of top ten finishers)

Year	Entrant	1	2	3	4	5	6	7	8	9	10	11	12	13	14	15	16	17	18	19	20	21	22	23	24	DC	Points
2018	MP Motorsport	BHR; FEA	BHR; SPR	BAK; FEA	BAK; SPR	CAT; FEA	CAT; SPR	MON; FEA	MON; SPR	LEC; FEA	LEC; SPR	RBR; FEA	RBR; SPR	SIL; FEA	SIL; SPR	HUN; FEA	HUN; SPR	SPA; FEA; 15	SPA; SPR; 18	MNZ; FEA; Ret	MNZ; SPR; 7	SOC; FEA; 13	SOC; SPR; 8	YMC; FEA; 12	YMC; SPR; 11	21st	3
2019	Campos Racing	BHR; FEA; 15	BHR; SPR; 17	BAK; FEA; 5	BAK; SPR; 7	CAT; FEA; 14	CAT; SPR; 18	MON; FEA; 4	MON; SPR; 5	LEC; FEA; Ret	LEC; SPR; 13	RBR; FEA	RBR; SPR													14th	30
2019	Trident													SIL; FEA; Ret	SIL; SPR; 14	HUN; FEA	HUN; SPR	SPA; FEA	SPA; SPR	MNZ; FEA	MNZ; SPR	SOC; FEA	SOC; SPR	YMC; FEA	YMC; SPR	14th	30

=== Complete GT World Challenge Europe results ===
==== GT World Challenge Europe Sprint Cup ====
(key) (Races in bold indicate pole position) (Races in italics indicate fastest lap)

Year	Team	Car	Class	1	2	3	4	5	6	7	8	9	10	Pos.	Points
2019	Saintéloc Racing	Audi R8 LMS	Pro	BRH; 1	BRH; 2	MIS; 1	MIS; 2	ZAN; 1	ZAN; 2	NÜR; 1; 16	NÜR; 2; 11	HUN; 1; 15	HUN; 2; 17	NC	0
2026	Boutsen VDS	Porsche 911 GT3 R (992.2)	Pro	BRH; 1; 2	BRH; 2; 12	MIS; 1; 27	MIS; 2; 18	MAG; 1; 9	MAG; 2; 12	**ZAN**; **1**; 2	ZAN; 2; 11	CAT; 1; 6	CAT; 2 Ret	9th	30.5

==== GT World Challenge Europe Endurance Cup ====
(key) (Races in bold indicate pole position) (Races in italics indicate fastest lap)

Year	Team	Car	Class	1	2	3	4	5	6	7	Pos.	Points
2020	Saintéloc Racing	Audi R8 LMS Evo	Pro	IMO; 5	NÜR; 9	SPA; 6H; 15	SPA; 12H; 8	SPA; 24H; 6	LEC; 12		15th	22
2023	CLRT	Porsche 911 GT3 R (992)	Pro-Am	MNZ	LEC; 35	SPA; 6H	SPA; 12H	SPA; 24H	NÜR	CAT	15th	19
2024	Schumacher CLRT	Porsche 911 GT3 R (992)	Pro	LEC; 14	SPA; 6H; 58†	SPA; 12H; Ret	SPA; 24H; Ret	NÜR; 2	MNZ; Ret	JED; Ret	15th	18
2026	Boutsen VDS	Porsche 911 GT3 R (992.2)	Pro	LEC; 11	MNZ; 4	SPA; 6H; 7	SPA; 12H; 15	SPA; 24H; 8	NÜR; 12	**ALG**; 3	6th	35

=== Complete ADAC GT Masters results ===
(key) (Races in bold indicate pole position) (Races in italics indicate fastest lap)

Year	Team	Car	1	2	3	4	5	6	7	8	9	10	11	12	13	14	DC	Points
2020	Team Zakspeed BKK Mobil Oil Racing	Mercedes-AMG GT3 Evo	LAU; 1; 11	LAU; 2; 15	NÜR; 1; 5	NÜR; 2; 11	HOC; 1; 17	HOC; 2; 16	SAC; 1; 5	SAC; 2; 17	RBR; 1 Ret	RBR; 2; 15	LAU; 1 DSQ	LAU; 2; 1	OSC; 1 Ret	OSC; 2; 6	12th	70

=== Complete Porsche Carrera Cup France results ===
(key) (Races in bold indicate pole position) (Races in italics indicate fastest lap)

Year	Team	1	2	3	4	5	6	7	8	9	10	11	12	Pos	Points
2021	Martinet by Alméras	**MAG**; **1**; 1	**MAG**; **2**; 1	**LEC**; **1**; 2	**LEC**; **2**; 1	SPA; 1; 5	SPA; 2; 2	MNZ; 1; 4	**MNZ**; **2**; 1	CAT; 1; 2	CAT; 2; 4	ALG; 1; 3	ALG; 2 Ret	2nd	229
2022	Martinet by Alméras	NOG; 1; 3	NOG; 2 Ret	**SPA**; **1**; 1	**SPA**; **2**; 1	MAG; 1; 4	MAG; 2; 2	**ZAN**; **1**; 1	**ZAN**; **2**; 1	**VAL**; **1**; 1	VAL; 2; 2	LEC; 1; 2	LEC; 2; 2	2nd	245
2023	Forestier Racing CLRT	CAT; 1; 2	CAT; 2; 3	**MAG**; **1**; 1	**MAG**; **2**; 6	**LMS**; 2	RBR; 1; 2	RBR; 2; 4	**MNZ**; **1**; 1	**MNZ**; **2**; 1	**LEC**; **1**; 1	**LEC**; **2**; 1		1st	239

=== Complete Porsche Supercup results ===
(key) (Races in bold indicate pole position) (Races in italics indicate fastest lap)

Year	Team	1	2	3	4	5	6	7	8	Pos.	Points
2021	Martinet by Alméras	MON; 3	RBR; 4	RBR; 13	HUN; 21	SPA; 7	ZND; 9	MNZ; 2	MNZ; 9	6th	81
2022	Martinet by Alméras	IMO; 6	MON; 2	SIL; Ret	RBR; Ret	LEC; 12	SPA; 11	ZND; 7	MNZ; 6	7th	58
2023	CLRT	MON; 5	RBR; 4	**SIL**; 11	HUN; 2	SPA; 3	ZND; 14	ZND; 10	MNZ; Ret	5th	79

=== Complete Asian Le Mans Series results ===
(key) (Races in bold indicate pole position; races in italics indicate fastest lap)

Year	Team	Class	Car	Engine	1	2	3	4	5	Pos.	Points
2023–24	Huber Motorsport	GT	Porsche 911 GT3 R (992)	Porsche M97/80 4.2 L Flat-6	SEP; 1	SEP; 2	DUB	ABU; 1; 18	ABU; 2; 18	35th	0

=== Complete Super GT results ===
(key) (Races in bold indicate pole position; races in italics indicate fastest lap)

Year	Team	Car	Class	1	2	3	4	5	6	7	8	9	DC	Points
2025	EBM GIGA Racing	Porsche 911 GT3 R (992)	GT300	OKA	FUJ	SEP; 17	FS1	FS2	SUZ	SUG	AUT	MOT	NC	0

Sporting positions
Preceded by Eddy Bénézet	Andros Trophy Elite; Champion; 2018–19	Succeeded by Jérémy Sarhy
